= National Register of Historic Places listings in Powell County, Montana =

Location of Powell County in Montana

This is a list of the National Register of Historic Places listings in Powell County, Montana.

This is intended to be a complete list of the properties and districts on the National Register of Historic Places in Powell County, Montana, United States. The locations of National Register properties and districts for which the latitude and longitude coordinates are included below, may be seen in a map.

There are 20 properties and districts listed on the National Register in the county, including 1 National Historic Landmark.

This National Park Service list is complete through NPS recent listings posted April 24, 2026.

== Current listings ==
	Name on the Register	Image	Date listed	Location	City or town	Description
1	Nick J. Bielenberg House	Nick J. Bielenberg House	August 10, 1979 (#79003719)	801 Milwaukee Ave. 46°24′03″N 112°43′34″W	Deer Lodge	
2	Charter Oak Mine and Mill		February 6, 2001 (#01000038)	United States Forest Service Road 227 B-1 in Helena National Forest; 46°29′23″N 112°25′03″W	Elliston	
3	William E. Coleman House	William E. Coleman House	May 21, 1979 (#79001422)	500 Missouri Ave. 46°23′55″N 112°43′51″W	Deer Lodge	
4	Conley Street Bridge	Conley Street Bridge	April 28, 2011 (#11000227)	Clark Fork River Crossing on Conley St. 46°23′26″N 112°44′14″W	Deer Lodge	Reinforced Concrete Bridges in Montana, 1900-1958 MPS
5	Deer Lodge American Women's League Chapter House	Deer Lodge American Women's League Chapter House	June 14, 1982 (#82003177)	802 Missouri Ave. 46°23′54″N 112°43′37″W	Deer Lodge	
6	Deer Lodge Central Business Historic District	Deer Lodge Central Business Historic District	August 13, 2008 (#08000767)	Roughly bounded by Cottonwood Ave. to the north, Montana Ave. to the south, 2nd St. to the west, and 4th St. to the east 46°23′54″N 112°44′07″W	Deer Lodge	
7	Fitzpatrick Ranch Historic District	Fitzpatrick Ranch Historic District	July 8, 1981 (#81000365)	Northwest of Avon; 46°47′19″N 112°46′38″W	Avon	
8	Grant-Kohrs Ranch/Warren Ranch	Grant-Kohrs Ranch/Warren Ranch	July 11, 2003 (#03000127)	Cattle Drive at Grant-Kohrs Ranch National Historic Site; 46°24′57″N 112°44′44″W	Deer Lodge	
9	Grant-Kohrs Ranch National Historic Site	Grant-Kohrs Ranch National Historic Site	August 25, 1972 (#72000738)	Edge of Deer Lodge; 46°24′31″N 112°44′17″W	Deer Lodge	
10	Hillcrest Cemetery	Hillcrest Cemetery	March 13, 2023 (#100008723)	West Milwaukee Ave., approx. .1 mi. west of Deer Lodge; 46°23′48″N 112°45′20″W	Deer Lodge	
11	William K. Kohrs Free Memorial Library	William K. Kohrs Free Memorial Library	May 7, 1979 (#79001423)	5th St. and Missouri Ave. 46°23′56″N 112°43′06″W	Deer Lodge	
12	Little Blackfoot River Bridge	Little Blackfoot River Bridge	January 4, 2010 (#09001185)	Milepost 0 on County Road 186 near its junction with U.S. Route 12; 46°34′24″N 112°39′50″W	Avon	
13	MacDonald Pass Airway Beacon	MacDonald Pass Airway Beacon	July 29, 2014 (#14000462)	United States Route 12; 46°33′16″N 112°18′32″W	Helena vicinity	
14	Montana Territorial and State Prison	Montana Territorial and State Prison	September 3, 1976 (#76001126)	925 Main St. 46°23′33″N 112°44′07″W	Deer Lodge	
15	Monture Guard Station	Monture Guard Station	January 18, 2023 (#100008550)	Lolo NF, Seeley Lake Ranger Dist. 47°07′38″N 113°09′09″W	Ovando vicinity	
16	Northern Pacific Railroad Completion Site, 1883	Northern Pacific Railroad Completion Site, 1883	August 19, 1983 (#83001075)	Off Interstate 90; 46°33′03″N 112°51′36″W	Goldcreek	
17	Prison Brickyard Historic District	Prison Brickyard Historic District	April 14, 1988 (#88000430)	Gravel road off Interstate 90, ¼ mile south of Deer Lodge; 46°23′12″N 112°43′37″W	Deer Lodge	
18	Rialto Theater	Rialto Theater	February 19, 1998 (#98000124)	418 Main St. 46°24′02″N 112°44′08″W	Deer Lodge	
19	Robworth Apartments	Robworth Apartments	June 20, 2023 (#100009074)	625 Main St. 46°23′46″N 112°44′07″W	Deer Lodge	
20	Trask Hall	Trask Hall	April 30, 1982 (#82003178)	703 5th Ave. 46°23′40″N 112°43′52″W	Deer Lodge	A building at the College of Montana

== See also ==
- List of National Historic Landmarks in Montana
- National Register of Historic Places listings in Montana
