= MacDonald Pass =

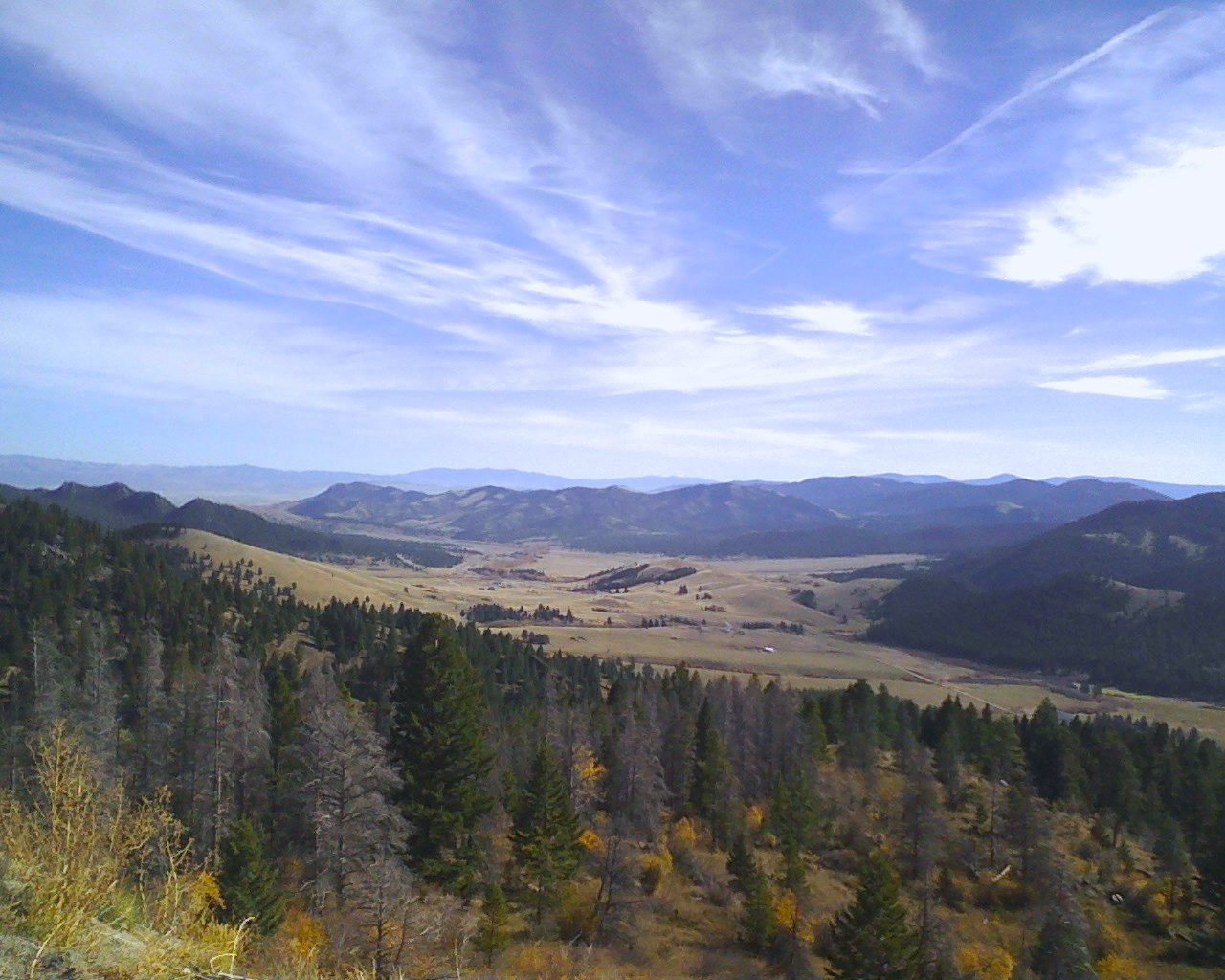
- MacDonald pass east side, looking into Lewis and Clark County
- Interactive map of MacDonald Pass
- Elevation: 6,312 feet (1,924 m)
- Traversed by: US 12

Third Approach
- Location: Lewis and Clark / Powell counties, Montana, US
- Range: Rocky Mountains
- Coordinates: 46°33′41″N 112°18′31″W

MacDonald Pass, el.6,312 feet (1,924 m), (also known as McDonald Pass) is a mountain pass on the continental divide west of Helena, Montana that is traversed by U.S. Route 12. The pass is one of three passes (MacDonald, Mullan and Priest) used in the 1870s-80s for travel between Helena and Deer Lodge, Montana over the continental divide.

== History ==
In 1864, when the Montana Territory was established, the territorial legislative assembly had limited funds to build roads in the territory, so toll roads were authorized to shift funding to private operators. The MacDonald road originated as part of a toll road authorized by Territorial Governor Green Clay Smith and built in 1867 by French Canadian Constant Guyot. Guyot ran a hay ranch along the Little Blackfoot River just east of Elliston, Montana. At the time the road was known as "The Frenchwoman's Road" because it was managed by Guyot's wife who operated a hostel at the west end of the road near Dog Creek. The hostel could sleep 30 men and Madame Guyot charged $2 for staying overnight and $1 per meal.

In August 1868, Madame Guyot was found murdered and robbed of $6,000 in gold dust in the hostel. Although Deer Lodge County posted a $500 reward, no one was ever brought to justice for the murder. Constant Guyot, a drunkard and known to mistreat his wife, was considered a prime suspect but was never charged with the crime. According to local folklore, Guyot admitted murdering his wife after he left the region. Travelers believed the hostel was haunted with the ghost of Madame Guyot. Shortly after the murder, Elijah M. "Lige" Dunphy, a local sawmill owner, bought the rights to the toll road and hired a Canadian emigrant, Alexander "Red" MacDonald, to manage the road. MacDonald contracted with a stage line, Gilmer, Salisbury and Company to use the road while supplying meals and lodging to travelers at the hostel.

In 1876–77, MacDonald turned over management of the road to Valentine Priest who later in 1879 built a competing road over Priest Pass. MacDonald acquired full ownership of the road from Dunphy in 1879. In 1885, because of declining use, MacDonald sold all his interests in the toll road.

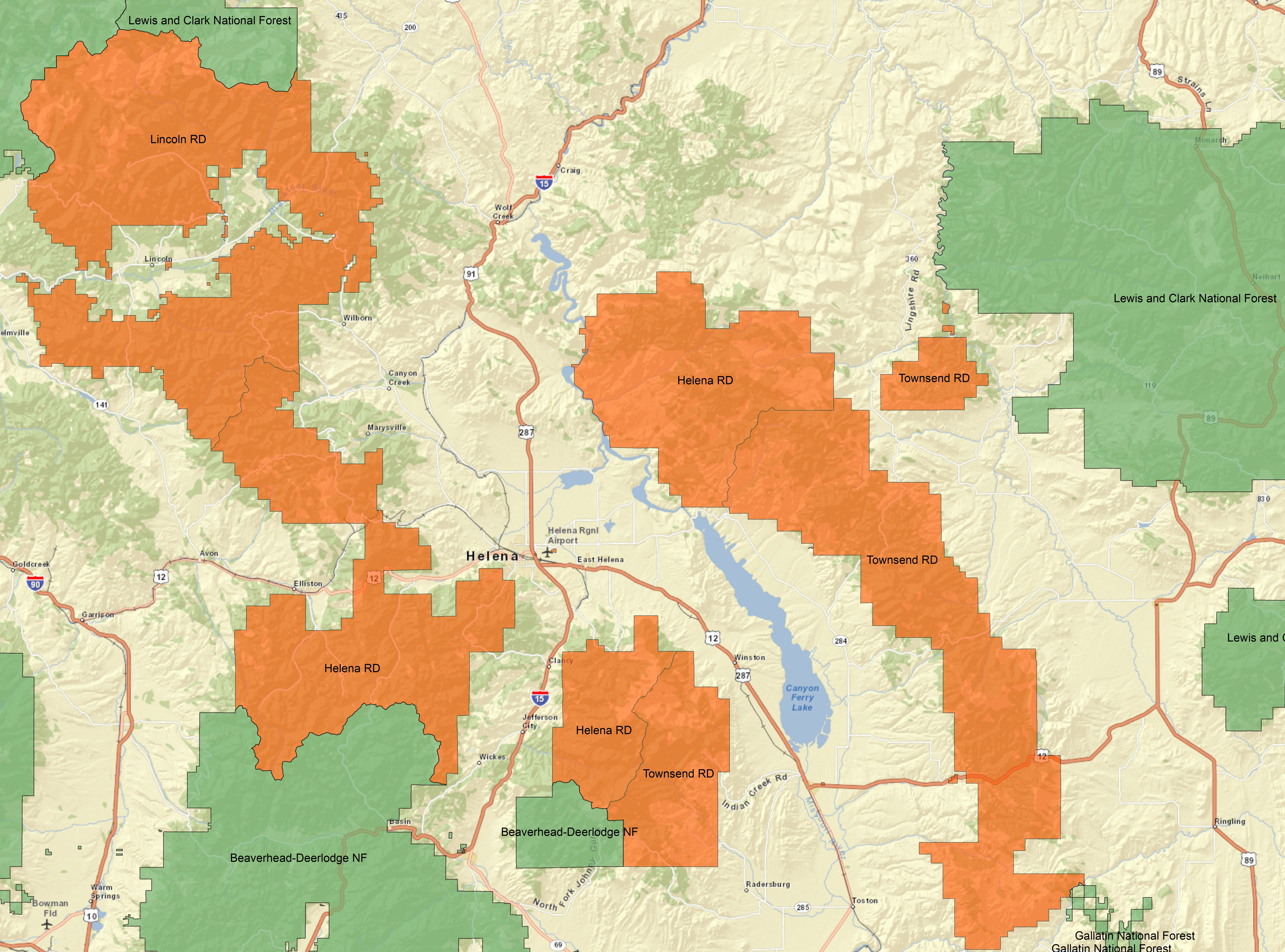
MacDonald pass is crossed by U.S. Highway 12 and goes through part of Helena National Forest

In 1889, after Montana achieved statehood, Lewis and Clark and Deer Lodge Counties revoked the toll road license for both the MacDonald and Priest Pass routes and made them public roads. Between 1889 and 1912, both Priest and MacDonald's roads were left to decay and only the Mullan Pass route was maintained. In 1912, Lewis and Clark and Powell County authorities contracted with the Montana State Prison to use convict labor to repair and improve the old MacDonald road. Throughout the 1920s, the state and county authorities debated which route between Helena and Deer Lodge–Mullan Pass, Priest Pass or MacDonald–should receive improvements. In 1927, the MacDonald road became part of the U.S. Federal Highway system as a section of U.S. Route 10 North. In 1931, the Montana Highway Department and the Federal Bureau of Public Roads funded an $89,000 project to construct a new road over MacDonald pass. The project was completed in 1932 and the road was completely paved by 1935. The road was widened to four lanes in the 1970s. MacDonald Pass and U.S. Route 12 remains the shortest east–west highway link between Helena and communities on Interstate 90 from Anaconda to Missoula and points west.

== Mountain ration ==
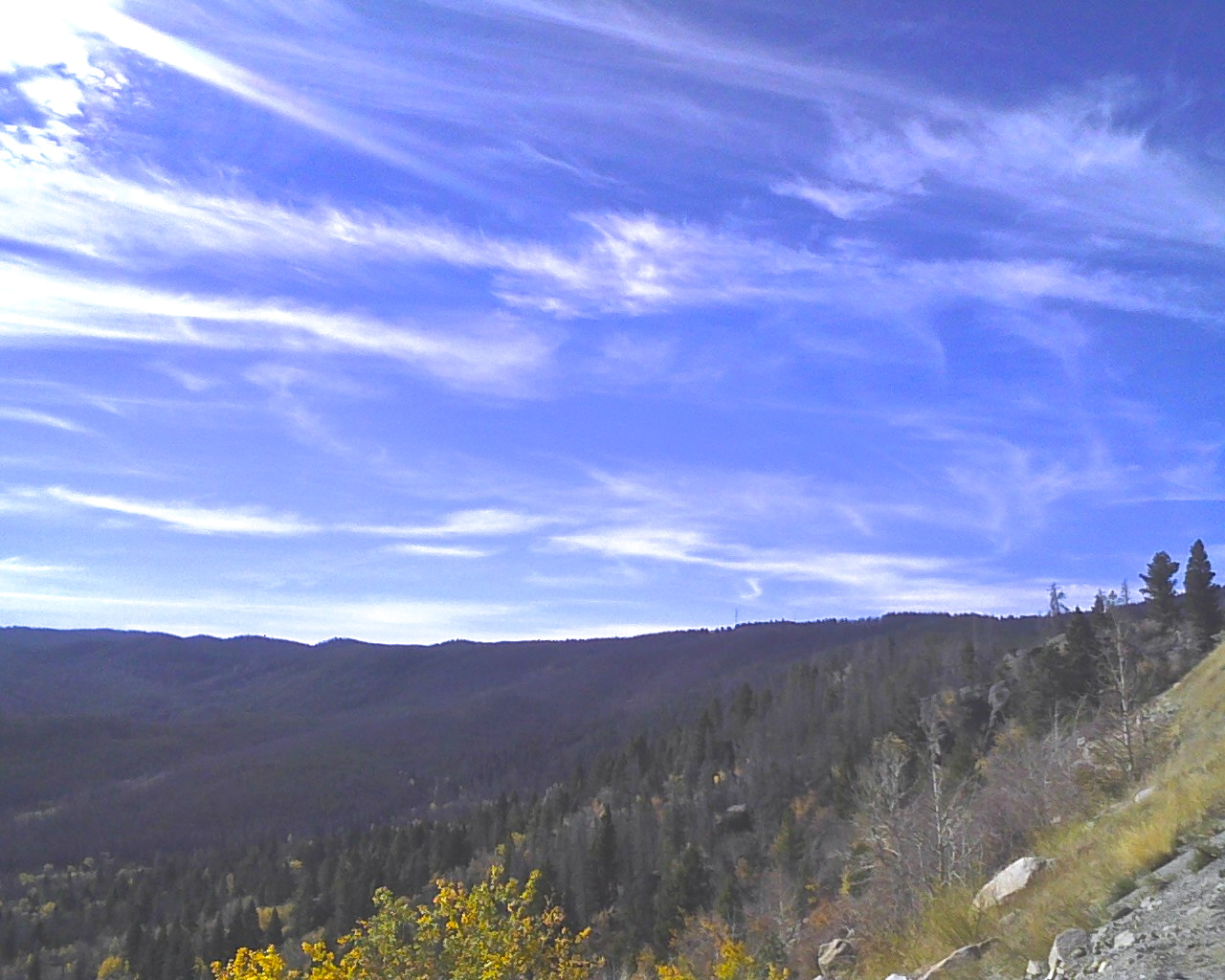
East side of pass looking toward summit (beacon tower in background marks approximate location of highest point of pass

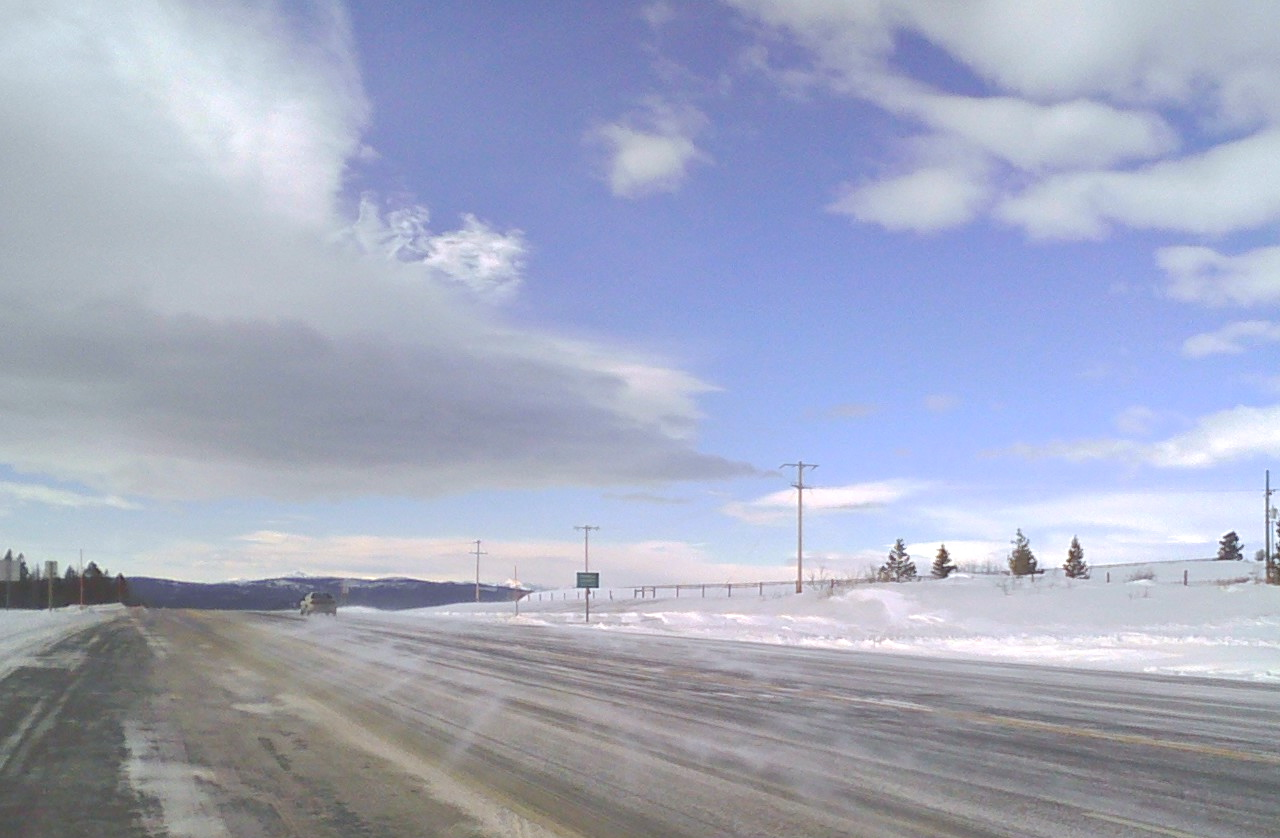
MacDonald Pass in winter, looking west into Powell County

On November 28, 1942, the elite 1st Special Service Force tried out the Mountain ration for the first time, during a training patrol to MacDonald Pass.

At 1400 hours all company commanders and one other officer from each company and a few others left by truck for MacDonald Pass to try living under winter conditions and try a new mountain ration ... On arrival at the selected spot the party broke up into groups of four and built shelters and fires of many different types. The Mountain ration, which comes in four varieties, is packed in boxes, each box containing the rations of 4 men for 3 meals, this proved to be more than the average man could eat. They included powdered soup and milk, canned meat and butter, cereal, chocolate, biscuits, compressed fruits, sugar, tea and coffee and powdered lemon.

== See also ==
- Mountain passes in Montana
