= Northern Pacific Railroad Completion Site, 1883 =

- U.S. National Register of Historic Places
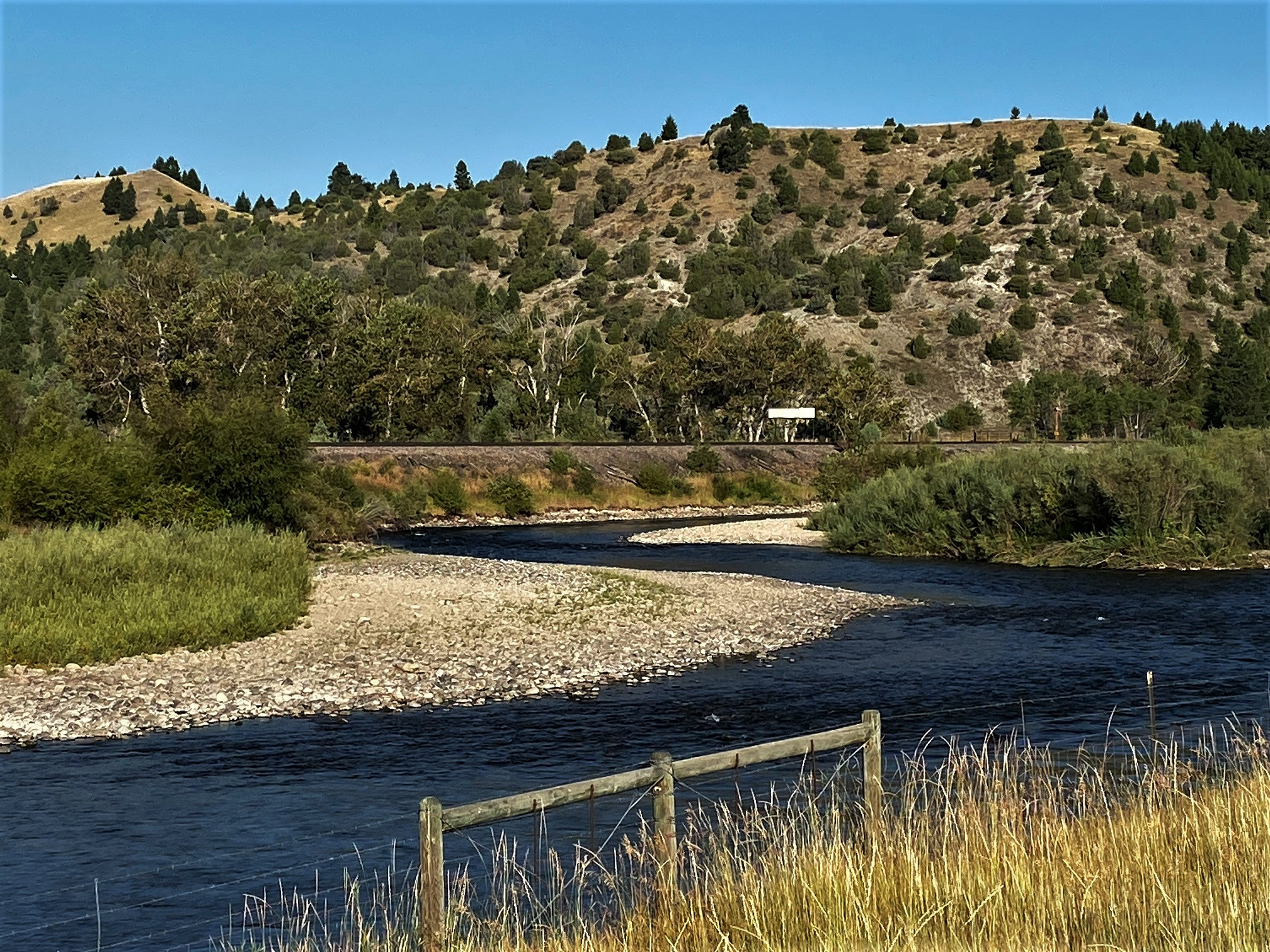

- Location within Montana Location within the United States
- Location: Off Interstate 90; Independence Creek, Montana
- Coordinates: 46°33′03″N 112°51′36″W
- Area: 2.5 acres (1.0 ha)
- NRHP reference No.: 83001075
- Added to NRHP: August 19, 1983

The Northern Pacific Railroad Completion Site is the location of the golden spike ceremony for the completion of the Northern Pacific Railway (NP) in 1883. The site is located near Gold Creek in Powell County, Montana, off Interstate 90, approximately 59 miles (95 km) southeast of Missoula and 40 miles (64 km) west of Helena.

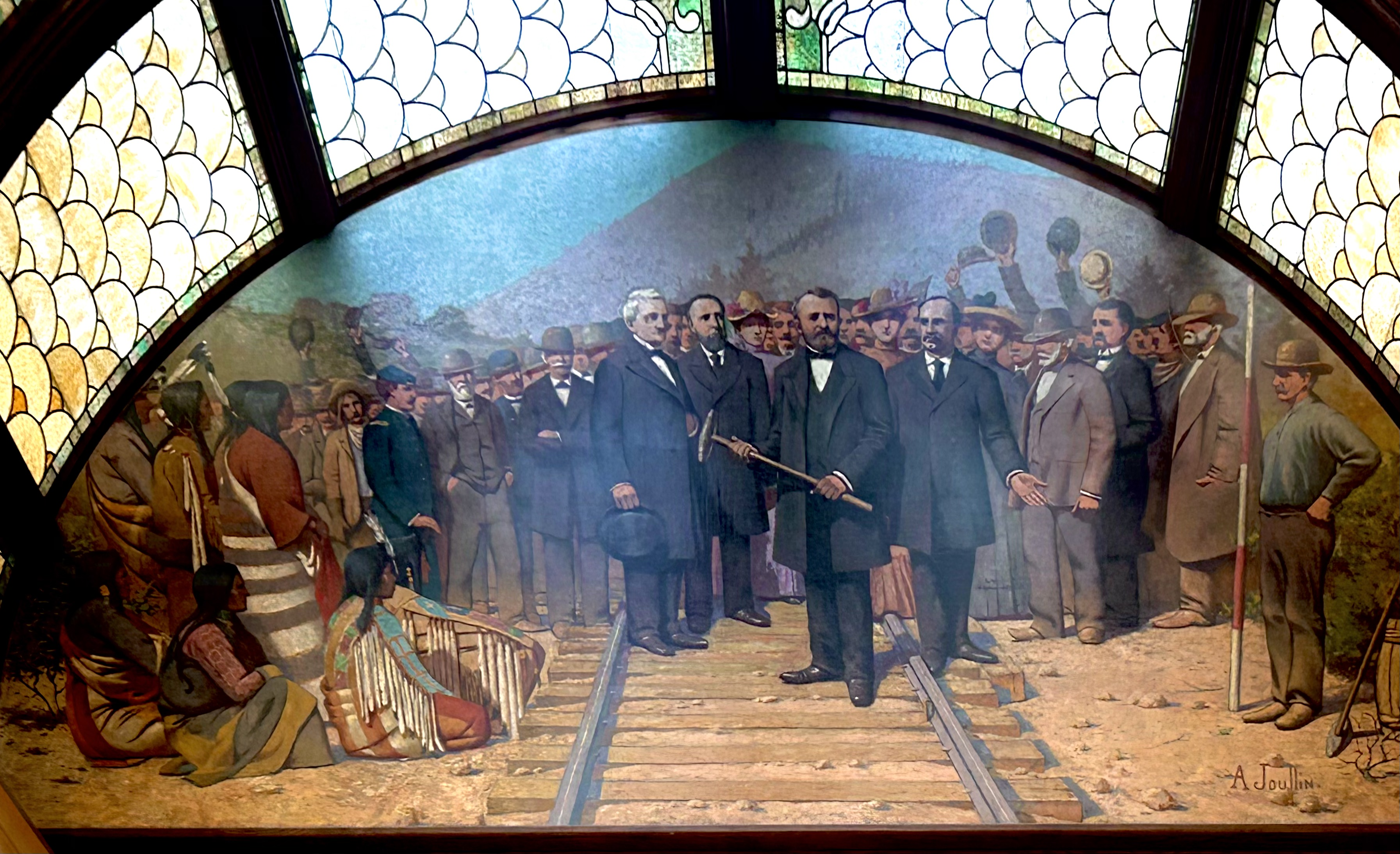
Amédée Joullin, Driving the Golden Spike, 1903. Oil on canvas painting commemorating the “golden spike” driven at Gold Creek, Montana, in 1883

NP, owned in 1883 by a consortium of "blind pool" investors devised by Henry Villard, was originally started by Jay Cooke. Cooke began building a transcontinental railroad route across the northern United States from Minnesota to the Pacific Coast in 1870. Crews built from both the eastern and western ends, progressing towards a yet undetermined meeting point somewhere in between. The two crews finally met near Independence Creek in Western Montana on August 22, 1883, which is near Gold Creek, where gold was first discovered in Montana. At this point the track was connected, completing the transcontinental line; however, the "golden spike" completion ceremony would not occur until September 8. Four trains carried 300 guests from the east, including the Northern Pacific's president, Henry Villard, Chairman of the NP's Executive Committee Frederick Billings and visiting dignitaries from the United States, England, and Germany. A fifth train arrived from the west coast. The track which had been laid earlier was temporarily torn up to be relaid ceremoniously during the event. The final "golden spike" driven was not actually made of gold, but was the same spike that was driven to begin the construction of the Northern Pacific in Carlton, Minnesota, thirteen years earlier. The spike was driven by Villard, former U.S. President Ulysses S. Grant, and Henry C. Davis, who had helped drive the first spike.

In 1935, the Deerlodge National Forest erected a monument at the site. The site was listed on the National Register of Historic Places on August 19, 1983. A wooden sign marking the location still exists and can be seen from Interstate 90 near where Independence Creek runs into the Clark Fork River. The 2.5-acre (1.0 ha) site includes the site of the final spike, as well as the location where pavilions were constructed for the 1883 celebrations.

== See also ==
- National Register of Historic Places listings in Powell County, Montana
- Golden Spike National Historical Park
