= Milltown State Park =

State park in Montana, United States

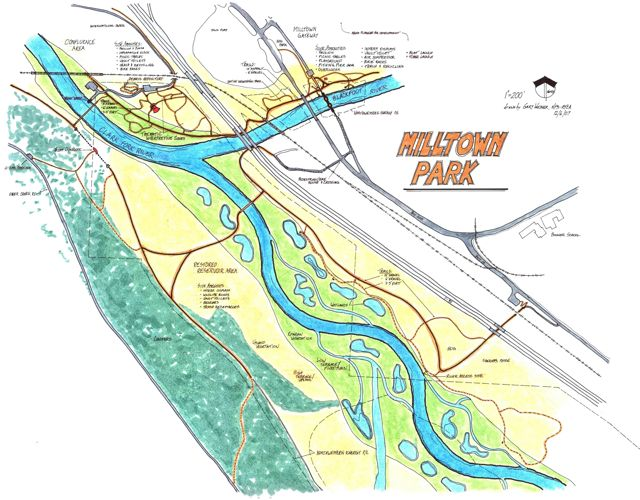
- Artist rendering of the proposed park

- Location within Montana
- Location: Missoula County, Montana, United States
- Nearest city: Missoula, Montana
- Coordinates: 46°52′17″N 113°53′53″W
- Area: 635 acres (257 ha)
- Elevation: 3,287 feet (1,002 m)
- Designation: Montana state park
- Established: 2018
- Visitors: 80,208 (in 2023)
- Administrator: Montana Fish, Wildlife & Parks
- Website: Milltown State Park

Milltown State Park is a public recreation area located at the confluence of the Clark Fork River and the Blackfoot River in Missoula County, Montana, United States. The state park opened in 2018 after the removal of the Milltown Dam and the remediation of the Milltown Reservoir Superfund Site. The park encompasses 635 acres and offers trails for hiking and biking, picnicking, and scenic overlooks.
