= Helmville, Montana =

- Unincorporated community
- Location within Montana Location within the United States
- Coordinates: 46°51′25″N 112°58′00″W
- Country: United States
- State: Montana
- County: Powell

Area
  - Total: 0.33 sq mi (0.85 km^{2})
  - Land: 0.33 sq mi (0.85 km^{2})
  - Water: 0 sq mi (0.00 km^{2})
- Elevation: 4,390 ft (1,340 m)

Population (2020)
  - Total: 38
  - Density: 115.4/sq mi (44.56/km^{2})
- Time zone: UTC-7 (Mountain (MST))
  - Summer (DST): UTC-6 (MDT)
- ZIP code: 59843
- Area code: 406
- GNIS feature ID: 2806662

Helmville is an unincorporated community in Powell County, Montana, United States. Helmville is located in the central section of the county near Montana Highway 141, 13 miles (21 km) southeast of Ovando. The community has a post office with ZIP code 59843. As of the 2020 census, Helmville had a population of 38.

The community is named for J. H. Helms, who applied for a post office. It was granted in 1872.

Helmville is near the confluence of Nevada Creek and the Blackfoot River, and is approximately 9 miles below Nevada Creek Dam.

== Demographics ==
Historical population
Census	Pop.	Note	%±
2020	38		—
U.S. Decennial Census
