= Little Blackfoot River =

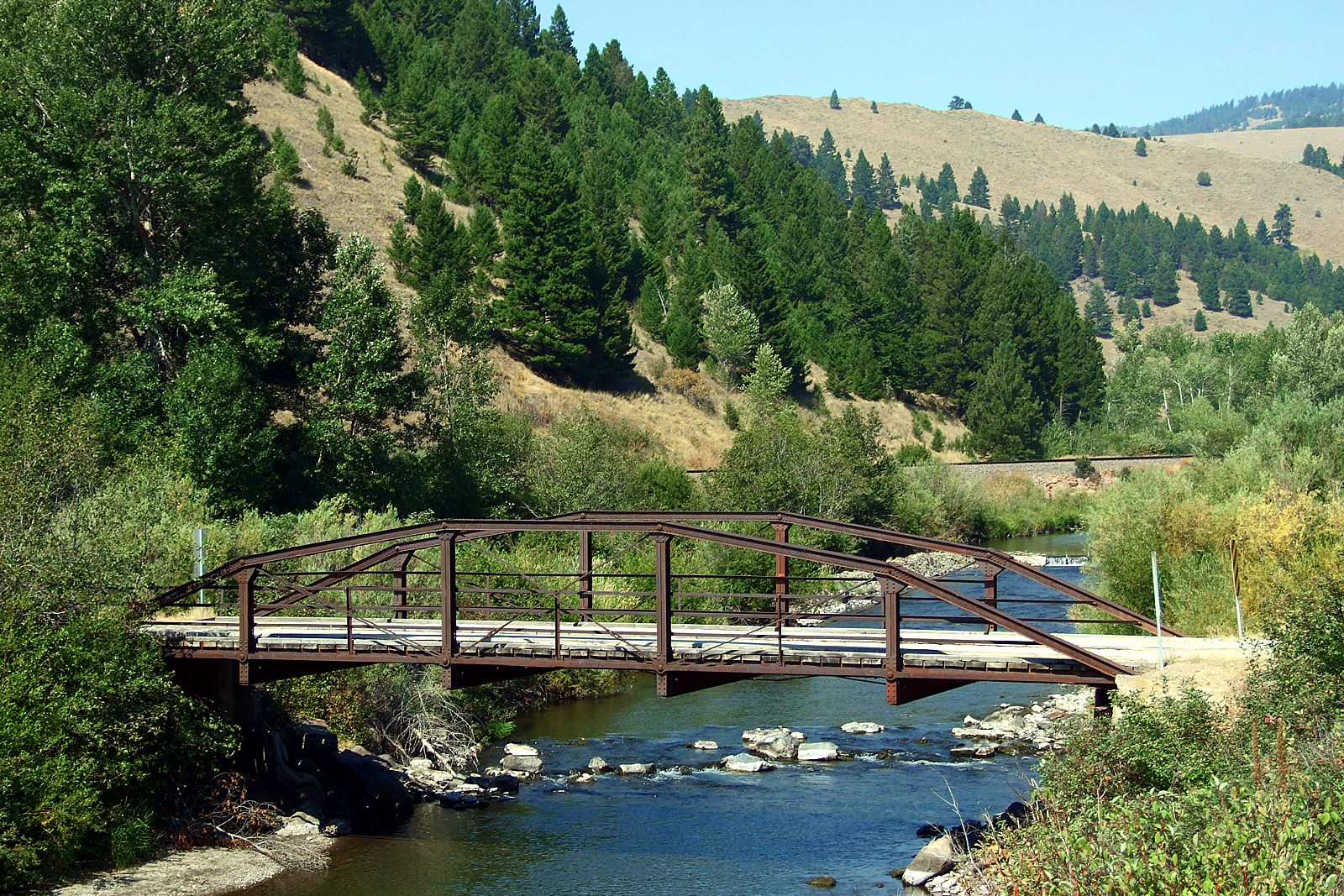
- The Little Blackfoot River Bridge at Avon, Montana.

- Location of the headwaters of the Little Blackfoot River in Powell County, Montana

Location
- Country: United States
- State: Montana
- County: Powell County

Physical characteristics
- Source
  - location: West side of the Continental Divide in southeastern Powell County, Montana
  - coordinates: 46°21′46″N 112°29′31″W
  - elevation: 7,476.5 ft (2,278.8 m)
- Mouth: Clark Fork River
  - location: Powell County, Montana
  - coordinates: 46°30′53.1″N 112°47′46.9″W
  - elevation: 4,243 ft (1,293 m)
- Length: 48 mi (77 km)
- Basin size: 413 sq mi (1,070 km^{2})

The Little Blackfoot River is a 48-mile (77 km) long tributary of the Clark Fork River, located in Powell County, Montana in the state of Montana in the United States.

== Location and flows ==
The Little Blackfoot River is located in Powell County, Montana. The river is 48-mile (77 km) long, and its watershed covers 413 square miles (1,070 km^{2}). Its name refers to the Piegan Blackfeet tribe, which frequently visited the area. The first mention of the name was an 1831 entry in a diary kept by John Work, trader for the Hudson's Bay Company. Work implies that the name did not originate with him, but with American fur trappers who had been using the area extensively to hunt beaver for the previous two decades.

The river begins near the top of the west side of the Continental Divide, near Thunderbolt Mountain in the Boulder Mountains. The course of the upper of the Little Blackfoot river (above Dog Creek) was established some time before the start of the Wisconsin glaciation (approximately 85,000 years ago) when a glacier on Thunderbolt Mountain deepened the valley floor. This glacier was about 24 to 25 miles (39 to 40 km) long. The river then deepened its valley by about 250 feet (76 m) before another glacier about 20 miles (32 km) long again covered the valley during the Wisconsin glaciation (85,000 to 11,000 years ago).

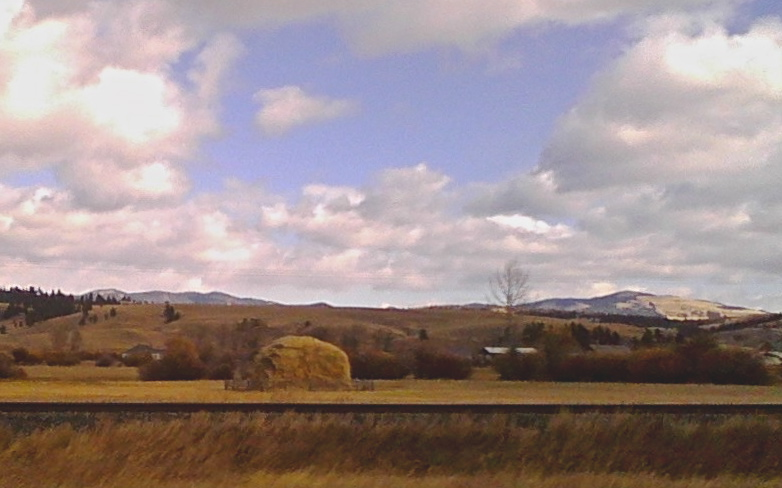
Little Blackfoot river valley near Avon, Montana

The river discharges into the Clark Fork River near Garrison, Montana. For about three-fourths of its length, the river flows through densely forested mountain terrain. Another 15 to 20 percent of the watershed consists of open mountain valleys while about 5 percent of the watershed is irrigated ranchland. Just over half the land in the watershed is privately owned.

Precipitation in the Little Blackfoot River watershed varies widely, from 10 to 20 inches (25 to 51 cm) in the valleys to 30 to 50 inches (76 to 127 cm) in the mountains. Water flow in the river also varies considerably, with a peak in May due to snowmelt and heavy spring rains. Lowest flows are recorded in September. The average annual peak discharge over the past 33 years (the period during which records have been kept) was 1,505 cubic feet (42.6 m^{3}) per second, while the average annual discharge was approximately 155 cubic feet (4.4 m^{3}) per second. Three small reservoirs—on Snowshoe Creek, Spotted Dog Creek, and Threemile Creek (Quigley Reservoir)—impeded tributary flows to the Little Blackfoot River. Releases from these reservoirs generally only occur to meet irrigation needs during periods of low stream flow.

The region is sparsely settled. The only towns of note are Elliston (population 219) and Avon, Montana, (population 111), with scattered single-family ranches and other rural properties elsewhere within the watershed. U.S. Route 12 parallels the river beginning about 1 mile (1.6 km) east of Elliston to the stream's discharge at Garrison.

== Water usage ==
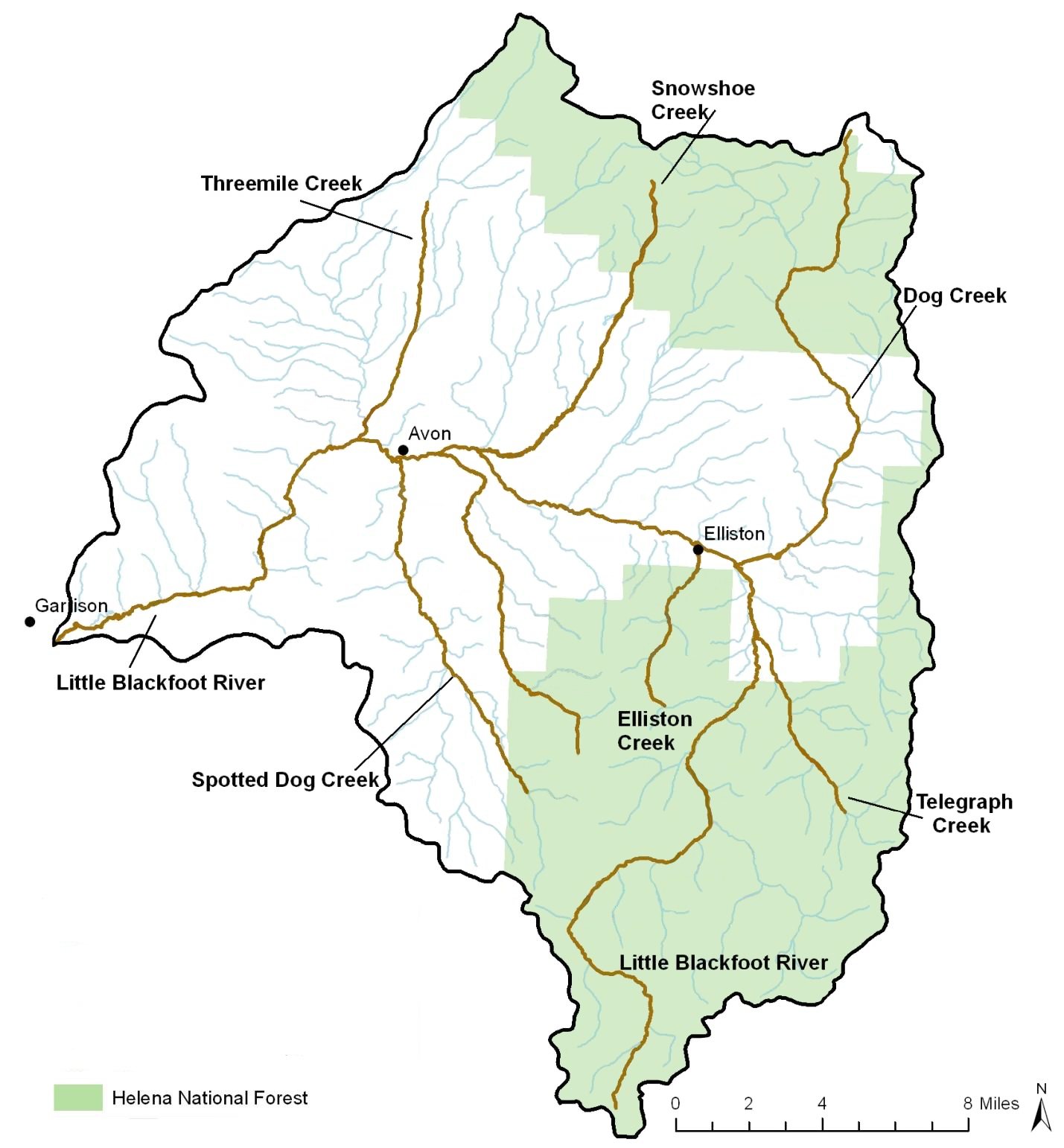
Map showing the Little Blackfoot River and its watershed.

Irrigation of ranchland to produce hay for cattle is the predominant use of the Little Blackfoot River. There are somewhere between 1,500 and 2,000 distinct prior-appropriation water rights on the Little Blackfoot River, although an exact accounting of how much water is taken annually is not known.

Mining was common in the Elliston area from about 1860 into the late 20th century, and has had some detrimental impact on the river. There are an estimated 100 abandoned mines in the upper Little Blackfoot River watershed (headwaters to Dog Creek), and another 100 abandoned mines on the lower reaches of the stream. At least 20 inactive or abandoned mines were identified by the Montana Department of Environmental Quality in 1995 as capable of having a significant potential impact on the watershed, and 15 of these are considered to be of high concern. Only seven of the sites had been reclaimed by November 2014. Three mining claims (American Gulch Placer, Ophir Placer, and the Carpenter Creek gold ore dredge) are currently active in the watershed.

Logging also occurred in the Little Blackfoot River watershed in the 1970s and 1980s, but has not been actively pursued since except on a very minimal, personal-use scale.

== Impairment and pollution ==
The most impaired tributaries are Dog Creek from its headwaters to the confluence with Meadow Creek, (Note: Unable to support aquatic life or a viable fishery.) Telegraph Creek, (Note: Unsuitable for drinking water along its entire length. From its headwaters to the confluence with Hahn Creek, it is unable to support aquatic life or a viable fishery.) and the unnamed creek flowing into Ontario Creek. (Note: Unsuitable for drinking water and unable to support aquatic life or a viable fishery along its entire length.) The 21.6-mile (34.8 km) upper Little Blackfoot River (headwaters to Dog Creek) are only partially able to support aquatic life or a viable fishery, but otherwise may be safely used for agriculture, drinking water, industry, and recreation. The lower Little Blackfoot River (Dog Creek to mouth at the Clark Fork) are slightly more polluted. It, too, is only partially able to support aquatic life or a viable fishery, and caution should be used when utilizing the river for drinking water or recreation. Its lower waters may, however, be safely used for agriculture and industry.

Several pollutants degrade the river. Nitrate and nitrite are pollutants of concern in the lower Little Blackfoot River (Elliston to Garrison). The use of the watershed for ranching, hay farming, and forest grazing accounts for about 75 percent of the nitrate and nitrite load. Toxic metal pollutants were first identified in the river in 1990. On the upper Little Blackfoot, cadmium, copper, cyanide, and lead exceeded by at least 10 percent the limit in which chronic impairment occurs in aquatic life. Levels of cadmium were twice the limit at which acute impairment of aquatic life occurred. Both arsenic and lead exceeded the allowable levels for human consumption.

On the lower Little Blackfoot, only lead exceeded by at least 10 percent the limit in which chronic impairment occurs in aquatic life, and no toxic metal was present in amounts twice the limit at which acute impairment of aquatic life occurred. The level of arsenic exceeded the allowable levels for human consumption.

== Fishery ==
The Little Blackfoot River has a relatively healthy fishery. Species present include mottled sculpin, mountain whitefish, slimy sculpin, westslope cutthroat trout, brook trout, brown trout, and rainbow trout, with the last three being introduced species. Although the fishery is generally healthy, westslope cutthroat trout have been listed as a "species of concern" by the Montana Department of Fish, Wildlife and Parks due to declining numbers and loss of habitat. Bull trout, as a "threatened" species by the United States Fish and Wildlife Service, have been extirpated from the watershed.

Sedimentation and silt are the primary pollutants degrading the fishery. Trampling of vegetation, largely by grazing cattle, has left the upper Little Blackfoot River prone to silting, with few deep pools or snags to provide habitat for fish. Some hard rock mining has altered the riverbed in a small portion of the stream so that it is overwide and shallow. Within the vicinity of Elliston, the Little Blackfoot River is in extremely good shape, ecologically. Between Elliston and North Trout Creek, lack of vegetation (due to cattle grazing and haying) has created significant erosion and sedimentation. The river was largely in good shape from North Trout Creek to Snowshoe Creek Road, but from Snowshoe Creek Road to Homestead Gulch the river was in extremely poor condition due to lack of vegetation, heavy erosion, the use of riprap to stabilize the banks, and the erection of gravel dikes to contain flooding. From Homestead Gulch to Beck Hill Road, the lower Little Blackfoot had numerous segments of excellent to severely degraded riparian conditions. From Beck Hill Road to the river's mouth, the river was in extremely poor condition, largely due to the use of riprap and heavy erosion. The Little Blackfoot River was assessed by the United States Environmental Protection Agency as being a substantial source of sediment source in the Clark Fork River.

== Historical importance ==
Explorer and United States Army lieutenant John Mullan discovered "Hell Gate Pass", a mountain pass near the headwaters of the Little Blackfoot River, on September 24, 1853. In March 1854, Mullan discovered Mullan Pass, which exited near the confluence of Uncle George Creek and Dog Creek.

The Little Blackfoot River Bridge in Avon, Montana, is a contributing site to Montana's Historic Steel Truss Bridges, which are listed on the National Register of Historic Places. The bridge, built for $2,540 ($81,643 in 2025 dollars) in 1914 by the O.E. Peppard construction firm, is 61 feet (19 m) long and 16 feet (4.9 m) wide. The bridge is a pin-connected camelback Pratt truss steel bridge. Pin-connected truss bridges are rare, and this is the only such bridge in Montana.

== See also ==
- Blackfoot River (Montana), sometimes called the Big Blackfoot River

== Bibliography ==
- Aarstad, Rich; Arguimbau, Ellen; Baumler, Ellen; Porsild, Charlene L.; Shovers, Brian (2009). Montana Place Names From Alzada to Zortman. Helena, Mont.: Montana Historical Society Press. ISBN 9780975919613.
- Alden, W.C. (1953). Physiography and Glacial Geology of Western Montana and Adjacent Areas. Geological Survey Professional Paper 231. Washington, D.C.: U.S. Government Printing Office.
- Kusnierz, Lisa; Brumm, Peter; Starr, Banning; Makus, Erik (December 2011). Little Blackfoot River Watershed TMDLs and Framework Water Quality Improvement Plan (PDF) (Report). U.S. Environmental Protection Agency.
- Lavender, David (2003). The Rockies. Lincoln, Neb.: University of Nebraska Press. ISBN 9780803280199.
- Lee, Larissa (November 2014). Metals Restoration Strategy for the Little Blackfoot Watershed: TMDL Planning Area (PDF) (Report). Montana Department of Environmental Quality.
- Leeson, Michael A. (1885). History of Montana, 1739-1885. Chicago: Warner, Beers & Co.
- Stevens, Isaac I. (1860). Reports of Explorations and Surveys to Ascertain the Most Practicable and Economical Route for a Railroad From the Mississippi River to the Pacific Ocean. Volume 12. Book I. Washington, D.C.: Thomas Ford, Printer.
