= Silver Bow Creek =

River in Montana, United States

Coordinates: 46°11′13″N 112°46′19″W

Silver Bow Creek, Durant Canyon

Silver Bow Creek is a 26-mile-long (42 km) headwater stream of the Clark Fork (river) originating within the city limits of Butte, Montana, from the confluence of Little Basin and Blacktail Creeks. A former northern tributary, Yankee Doodle Creek, no longer flows directly into Silver Bow Creek as it is now captured by the Berkeley Pit. Silver Bow Creek flows northwest and north through a high mountain valley, passing east of Anaconda, Montana, where it becomes the Clark Fork at the confluence with Warm Springs Creek.

For more than one hundred years Silver Bow Creek was an open industrial sewer, primarily used as a depository for mining and smelting waste. A record flood in 1908 dispersed mass quantities of heavy metals and arsenic along its entire floodplain, which posed significant risks to environmental and human health.

== Superfund designation, remediation, and restoration ==
The Upper Clark Fork river basin is America's largest Superfund site. Butte, at the headwaters, was the source of much of the watershed's contamination from over a century of industrial-scale mining and ore processing activities. This Superfund mega site includes the cities of Butte, Anaconda, Deer Lodge, and Bonner-Milltown (just upriver of Missoula). The contamination extends along a river corridor of 120 miles (190 km) that reaches from Butte to the Milltown Reservoir Superfund Site and includes adjacent areas such as the Anaconda Smelter Stack. The mining and smelting operations of the Anaconda Copper Mining Corporation were the primary cause of this pollution at the headwaters of the Clark Fork.

The Anaconda Copper Mining Corporation (ACM) merged with the Atlantic Richfield Corporation (ARCO) in 1977. Shortly thereafter, in 1983, ARCO ceased mining and smelting operations in the Butte-Anaconda area. For more than a century, the ACM mined and smelted ore in Butte. Smelters operated in Butte until c. 1920 and in nearby Anaconda until 1981. In Butte, mine tailings and smelter waste were dumped directly into Silver Bow Creek, creating a 120-mile (190 km) plume of pollution extending down the valley to Milltown Dam on the Clark Fork just upstream of Missoula. Air- and waterborne pollution poisoned livestock and agricultural soils throughout the Deer Lodge Valley. Modern environmental clean-up efforts began under Superfund in 1983 and continue to this day.

The Environmental Protection Agency (EPA) designated Silver Bow Creek as the Streamside Tailings (SST) Superfund site in 1985, with ARCO as the principal party responsible for remedy or clean-up. The EPA selected a remedy (Note: Remedy is a technical, legal term for the cleanup or other treatment of hazardous waste in a way that protects human and environmental health.) for the 26-mile-long (42 km) Silver Bow Creek (SST) Superfund in a Record of Decision released in 1995. Shortly after the Record of Decision for remedy, the state of Montana became the lead party on the remedy and, for reasons of efficiency, combined remedy with restoration. (Note: Restoration is a step that follows remedy or clean up. With restoration, environmental conditions are moved toward the baseline, a condition as if the environmental injury had never occurred.)

The state of Montana filed a lawsuit against ARCO in 1983, in parallel to the EPA's Superfund listing, to recover natural resource damages to water, soil, vegetation, fish, and wildlife in the Upper Clark Fork River basin. In a 1999 state, federal and tribal settlement, Atlantic Richfield Company agreed to pay $215 million to the state, through the Natural Resource Damage Program, to resolve part of the state's claims. From the settlement amount, $80 million plus interest was set aside for the Montana Department of Environmental Quality and US-EPA to implement the remedy for Silver Bow Creek. In addition, the Greenway Service District secured $23.5 million from the NRDP to enhance the remedy (cleanup) of Silver Bow Creek with restoration. To date DEQ, NRDP, and GSD have successfully worked together to remediate and restore about 70% of the Silver Bow Creek corridor. The long-term land use as a recreational corridor will assure that these efforts are protected for and accessible to future generations.

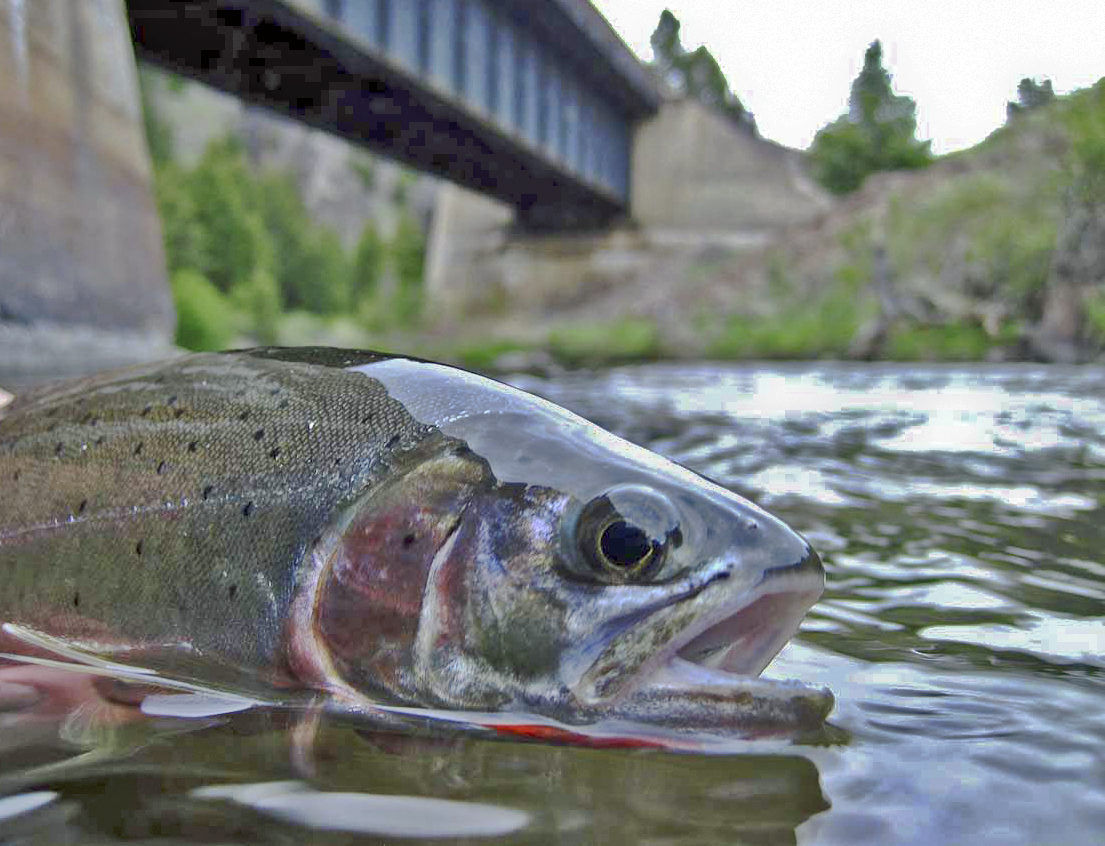
West-slope cutthroat trout in Silver Bow Creek

The cleanup of Silver Bow Creek was scheduled for completion in 2014. The remediation and restoration of Silver Bow Creek is the largest project of its kind in the United States and has won local, national, and international awards for environmental excellence. As of this writing, remedy and restoration of the final reach – Durant Canyon – is underway. Westslope cutthroat trout, a native species and Montana's state fish, are an apex predator species set as an indicator of successful recovery of Silver Bow Creek.
