= Montana Highway 141 =

Highway in the United States

Montana Highway 141
- MT 141 highlighted in red

Route information
- Maintained by MDT
- Length: 32.468 mi (52.252 km)

Major junctions
- South end: US 12 at Avon
- North end: MT 200 near Helmville

Location
- Country: United States
- State: Montana
- Counties: Powell

Highway system
- Montana Highway System; Interstate; US; State; Secondary
← MT 135	→ MT 200

Montana Highway 141 (MT 141) is a 32-mile-long (51 km) state highway in west-central Montana. It begins at U.S. Route 12 (US 12) at Avon and ends at MT 200 north of Helmville.

== Route description ==
MT 141 begins in Avon at an intersection with US 12. The highway heads to the northwest through the plains between the Garnet Range to the west and the Helena National Forest to the east. The highway ends at an intersection with MT 200 about six miles (9.7 km) north of Helmville.

== Major intersections ==
The entire route is in Powell County.

Location	mi	km	Destinations	Notes
Avon	0.000	0.000	US 12 – Helena, Missoula	
	27.492	44.244	S-271 – Helmville	
	32.468	52.252	MT 200 – Lincoln, Missoula	
1.000 mi = 1.609 km; 1.000 km = 0.621 mi
