= Milltown Reservoir Superfund Site =

Hazardous waste site in Missoula County, Montana, United States

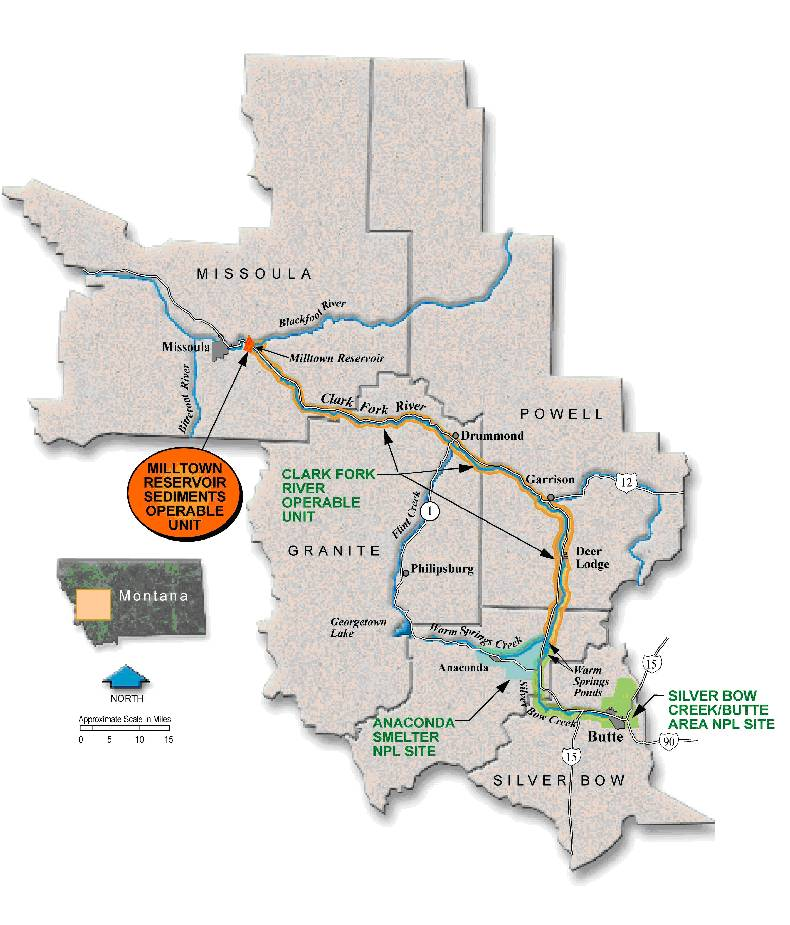
The Clark Fork River Operable Unit

The Milltown Reservoir Sediments Superfund Site is a major Superfund site in Missoula County, Montana, seven miles east of Missoula. It was added to the National Priorities List in 1983 when arsenic groundwater contamination was found in the Milltown area. The contamination resulted from a massive flood three years after its construction in 1905, which washed millions of tons of mine waste into the Clark Fork River, ultimately ending up behind the Milltown Dam.

Since 1992, the site has been a part of the Clark Fork River Superfund Complex, consisting of three major sites (the other two in Anaconda and Butte) along a 120-mile stretch of the Clark Fork River. The Complex is the largest and most expensive Superfund site in the United States.

== Overview ==
The Milltown Dam (46°52′18″N 113°53′33″W) was an earth-fill gravity-type hydroelectric dam on the Clark Fork river in Missoula County, in the western part of Montana. The dam was located about seven miles east of Missoula, Montana, at the confluence of the Blackfoot River with the Clark Fork. Built in 1908 by copper mining tycoon William A. Clark, it was meant to supply hydroelectricity to his sawmills in nearby Bonner, Montana. Clark's sawmills supplied the giant timbers used to shore up the walls of the mine shafts in Butte. Since the 1870s, the Anaconda and Butte areas had been mined as one of the richest deposits of copper sulfide ever found in North America. With the dam just months old, however, a record flood on the Clark Fork washed tons of toxic mining sediment downstream, where it settled at the base of the dam to remain until remediation began, with a cumulative total of around 6.6 million cubic yards of sediment contaminated with arsenic, lead, zinc, copper, and other metals in the former reservoir bed.

== Superfund designation and study ==
In 1981, through a routine Missoula County water quality study, four wells in Bonner that served 35 households, were found to be contaminated with heavy metals. The Environmental Protection Agency and the Montana Department of Environmental Quality closed the wells and began to look into the cause of the contamination of Milltown area groundwater. Two years later, in September 1983, it was determined that the contamination was the result of a buildup of heavy metal laden sediment from years of intensive mining upstream by Anaconda Copper. That finding resulted in the addition of the Milltown Dam Site to the initial National Priorities List. Review began immediately by the EPA to determine the Potentially Responsible Party (PRP) and to develop a plan to fix the groundwater contamination problem. In 1977 Anaconda Copper was purchased by the Atlantic Richfield Corporation (ARCO), which assumed liability for the damages. In 2000, ARCO was purchased by BP.

In 1992, through the action of committed citizens in the Deer Lodge Valley, the EPA designated the Clark Fork River upstream from the Milltown Dam to the Warm Springs Ponds part of the Superfund Site. In 1995, the study of the extent of site contamination was completed by the EPA and ARCO. A subsequent feasibility study attempted to determine how to restore the Milltown groundwater. That study was halted, however, as the unusually wet winter of 1996 sent a large ice jam down the Blackfoot River and into the Milltown Reservoir, causing a severe scouring of the contaminated sediment in the reservoir bed and caused a fish kill downstream.

Fearful of a major uncontrolled release of water (and sediment), officials quickly drew down the level of the reservoir, stranding the ice pack before it could cause any more damage. The EPA immediately began to examine the extent of the damage, and after a contentious public discussion, it became clear that the threats of continued releases of contaminated sediments into the downstream fishery must be addressed in the final remediation plan. Over 10,000 residents of Western Montana sent public comments in support of complete dam removal and full cleanup.

In 2003 the State of Montana, through its Natural Resource Damage Program, drafted a conceptual plan for the restoration of the Milltown Dam site. In December 2004, the final remediation plan was released by the EPA, calling for the removal of more than two million cubic yards of contaminated sediment and the removal of the Milltown Dam. In August 2005, a consent decree was signed by the parties, allowing the project to move out of the planning phase and onto the ground. After over 20 years of study and litigation, work began on the Milltown Site on June 1, 2006 with a drawdown of the Milltown Reservoir. Contaminated reservoir sediments were hauled to an upstream repository near the town of Opportunity, a move opposed by some local residents.

== Three Rs of the Superfund project ==
=== Remediation ===
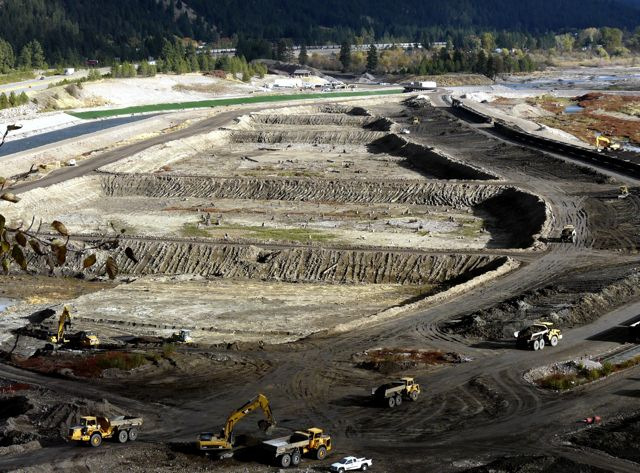
Sediment removal as part of the remediation in the fall of 2008

Remediation is defined as the cleanup of hazardous substances to protect human health and the environment. The remediation on the Milltown/Clark Fork River Site is being led by the EPA and its chief contractor, Envirocon. The remediation phase includes the removal of three million tons of contaminated sediment and the Milltown Dam itself. Remediation goals include the restoration of the Milltown Aquifer and the downriver water quality as well as the trout fishery through the confluence area. Work on the ground began in the summer of 2006 and the remediation phase should come to a close by December 2009, with the project leadership shifting over to the State of Montana for the restoration of the area.

=== Restoration ===
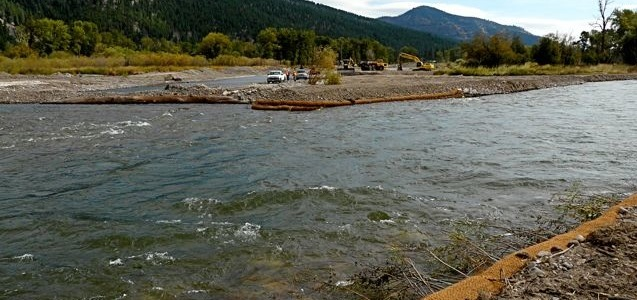
The initial stream bank stabilization being done upstream from the Milltown Dam site underway by the state's contractor, Envirocon

Restoration in the context of Milltown is the creation of a natural river and floodplain following dam and sediment removal. With funds gained through a Natural Resource Damage Program lawsuit against ARCO, the State of Montana is leading the restoration of the confluence area to a natural state. Restoration work began in summer 2008 and ramped up as the sediment removal drew to a close. The restoration work includes the sculpting of a new river channel, the creation of fluvial wetlands, bank reinforcement, and reestablishment of natural vegetation cover. Restoration work was scheduled to be finished by 2012.

=== Redevelopment ===
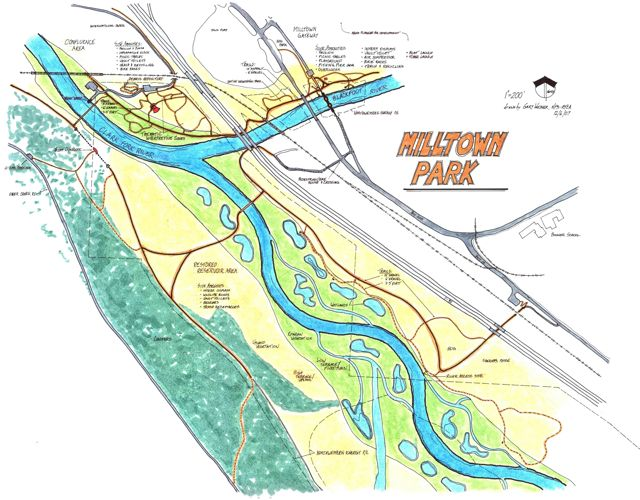
A conceptual design for the proposed state park

Redevelopment is the effort to return former hazardous waste sites to productive use. The plan for the redevelopment of the Milltown area includes the creation of a state park with a trail system connecting the surrounding communities. In 2007, a conceptual design for the park was created in cooperation by the Milltown Superfund Redevelopment Working Group and the Montana Department of Fish, Wildlife, and Parks, the National Park Service Rivers and Trails Program, the Idaho-Montana Chapter of the American Society of Landscape Architects. In 2009, a grant proposal for the initial park development was submitted to the Natural Resource Damage Program. Milltown State Park opened in 2018.

== See also ==
- List of Superfund sites in Montana
