= Deer Lodge Central Business Historic District =

- U.S. National Register of Historic Places
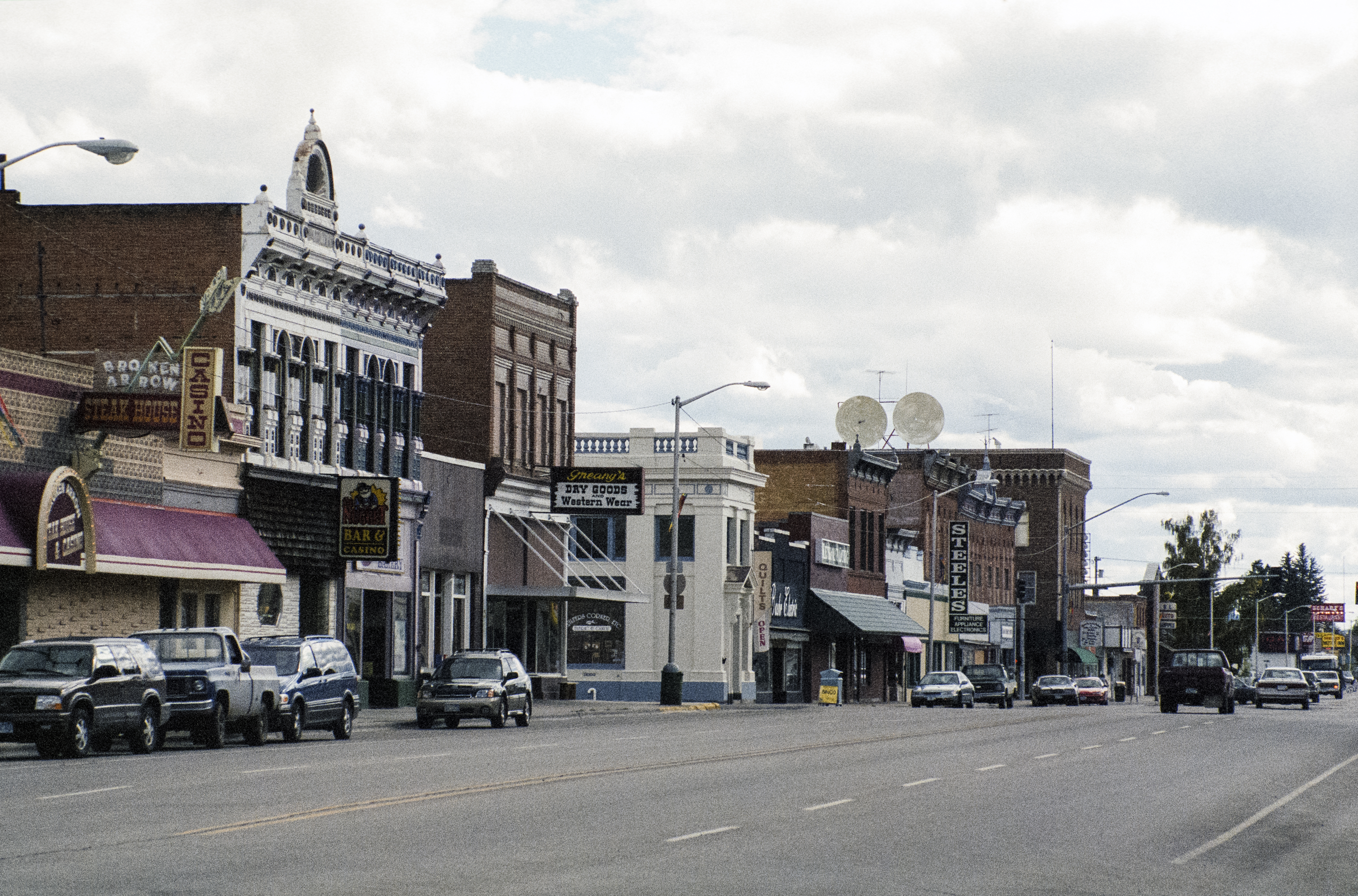

- Location within Montana
- Location: Roughly bounded by Cottonwood Ave. to the N., Montana Ave. to the S., 2nd St. to the W. and 4th St. to the E., Deer Lodge, Montana
- Coordinates: 46.398°N 112.735°W
- Area: 13 acres (5.3 ha)
- Built: 1884
- Architect: Michael J. Beezer and others
- Architectural style: Late Victorian, Classical Revival, Romanesque Revival
- NRHP reference No.: 08000767
- Added to NRHP: August 13, 2008

The Deer Lodge Central Business Historic District, in Deer Lodge, Montana, in Powell County, Montana, is a historic district which was listed on the National Register of Historic Places in 2008.

The 13 acres (5.3 ha) district includes three blocks on both sides of Deer Lodge's Main Street between Cottonwood Ave. to the north and Montana Ave. to the south, and the closer sides of two blocks of 2nd St. and 4th St. (Main St. is effectively 3rd St.) This includes 61 main buildings, of which 46 are contributing buildings, and three auxiliary buildings.

It includes the Rialto Theater (1921), at 418 Main Street, which was separately listed on the National Register in 1998.

The district includes early Western Commercial, Late Victorian, Classical Revival, and Romanesque Revival architecture.

Buildings in the district includes some Early Western Commercial works, built before approximately 1884. These are single-story, wood-frame or brick, with a tall, false-front covering a gabled roof extending behind it, some of them being free-standing (in contrast to most other buildings in the district which share adjoining walls). These include:

- 408 Main Street (built between 1884 and 1888), which served as a saloon. It has a stucco and log exterior on its street-facing facade. Like most other early Western Commercial buildings in Deer Lodge, it is "unadorned and has a centered, recessed entry with plate glass windows on either side that angle in toward the door."
- 209 Missouri Avenue (built between 1884 and 1888), an old firehouse which served as the city's fire station until 1919. It is woodframe, on a cement foundation, with a brick veneer that has been covered in horizontal wood cladding. It has a recessed entry like 408 Main Street's. Its only architectural detailing is a wood cornice with pairs of wooden brackets, on its front facade.
- 304 Cottonwood (built 1884, with additions soon after), "an excellent example of an early Western Commercial building that is two-stories ... Although the building has been remodeled, it is the only building example of this early Western Commercial style that exhibits a porch and balcony. "

Other buildings in the district include:

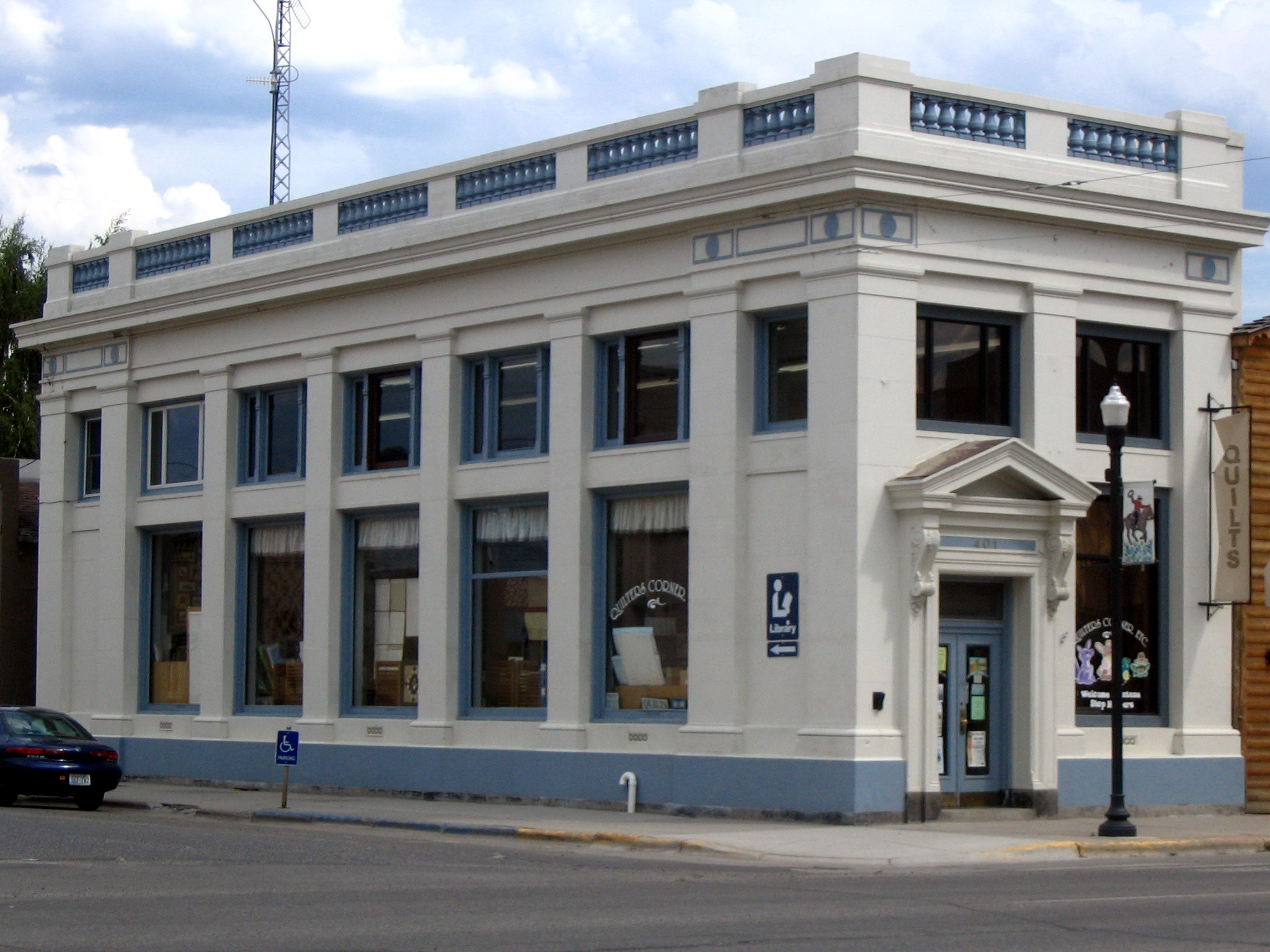
Larabie Brothers Bank

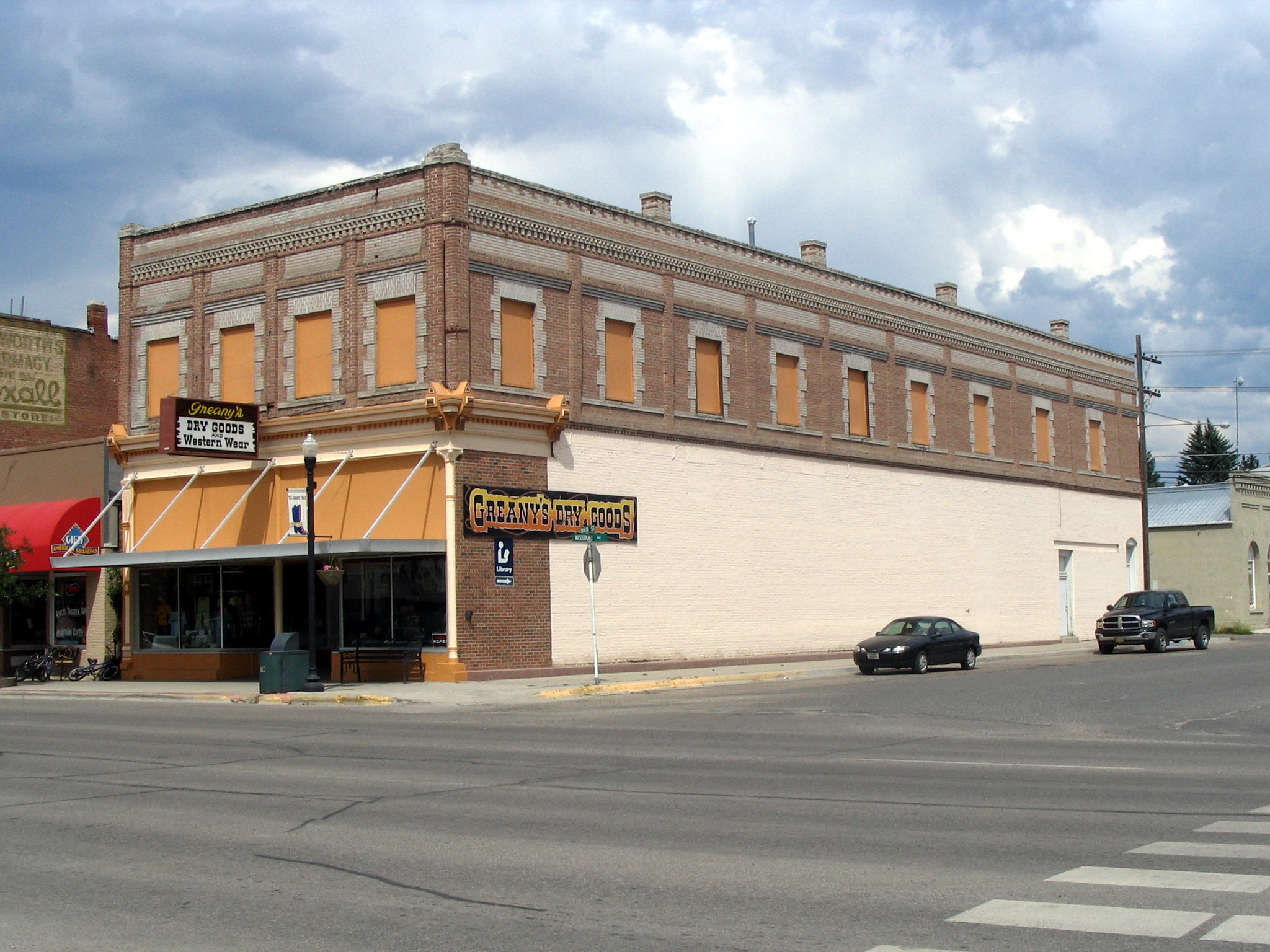
Bonner Building in 2007

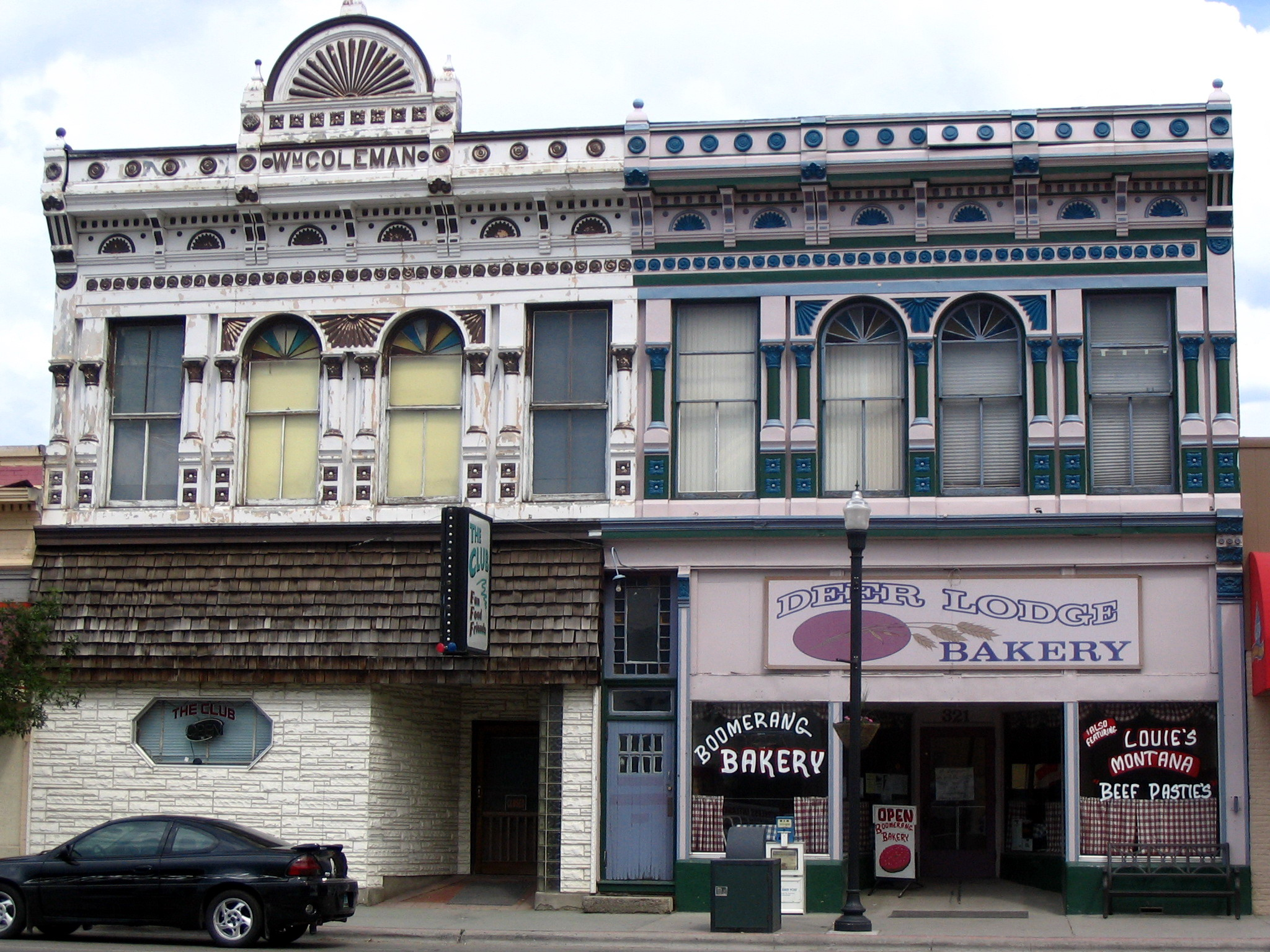
Coleman-Lansing Building, with a Mesker Brothers facade

- Larabie Brothers Bank (1912), 401 Main Street. This two-story building is "an excellent example of a Western Commercial style building with Neoclassical Revival influence ..." It was reported at time of the 1912 opening that "the honor of making the first deposit went to the architect supervisor of the building construction, M.J. Beezer of Seattle, Washington (The Silver State, March 27, 1912:1)."
- Deer Lodge's First Presbyterian Church (also known as Mary Ann Larabee Memorial Presbyterian Church) and its old St. Josephs Hospital, designed by Beezer Brothers.
- Bonner Building (or Bonner Block) (1879 main level, 1909 second story), 329 Main Street. This is a "Western Commercial style building with Victorian influences". It "is a two-story, flat roofed brick building with commercial space on the main level and sleeping rooms above. The building is unique in that the main level displays much less ornamental detailing that the upper level. The differences in style reflect the dates when each story was built."
- Coleman-Lansing Building, which has a Mesker Brothers facade.
- Deer Lodge Bank & Trust Co. (1921), 430 Main Street.
- Grant Hotel (1908-1912), 201-205 Missouri Ave
- Hotel Deer Lodge (1911-1912), 322-328 Main St.

- Masonic Temple (1919), 501-503 Main St.
