= Carpenter's Bar, Montana =

Unincorporated community in Montana, U.S.

Coordinates: 46.665°N 112.525°W

Carpenter's Bar, Montana was an early unincorporated community in Powell County, site of a post office from June–December 1872, with Thomas Pounds as postmaster. It was the site of a gold mine discovered on June 3, 1865.
