= Rialto Theater (Deer Lodge, Montana) =

- Rialto Theatre
- U.S. National Register of Historic Places
- U.S. Historic district – Contributing property
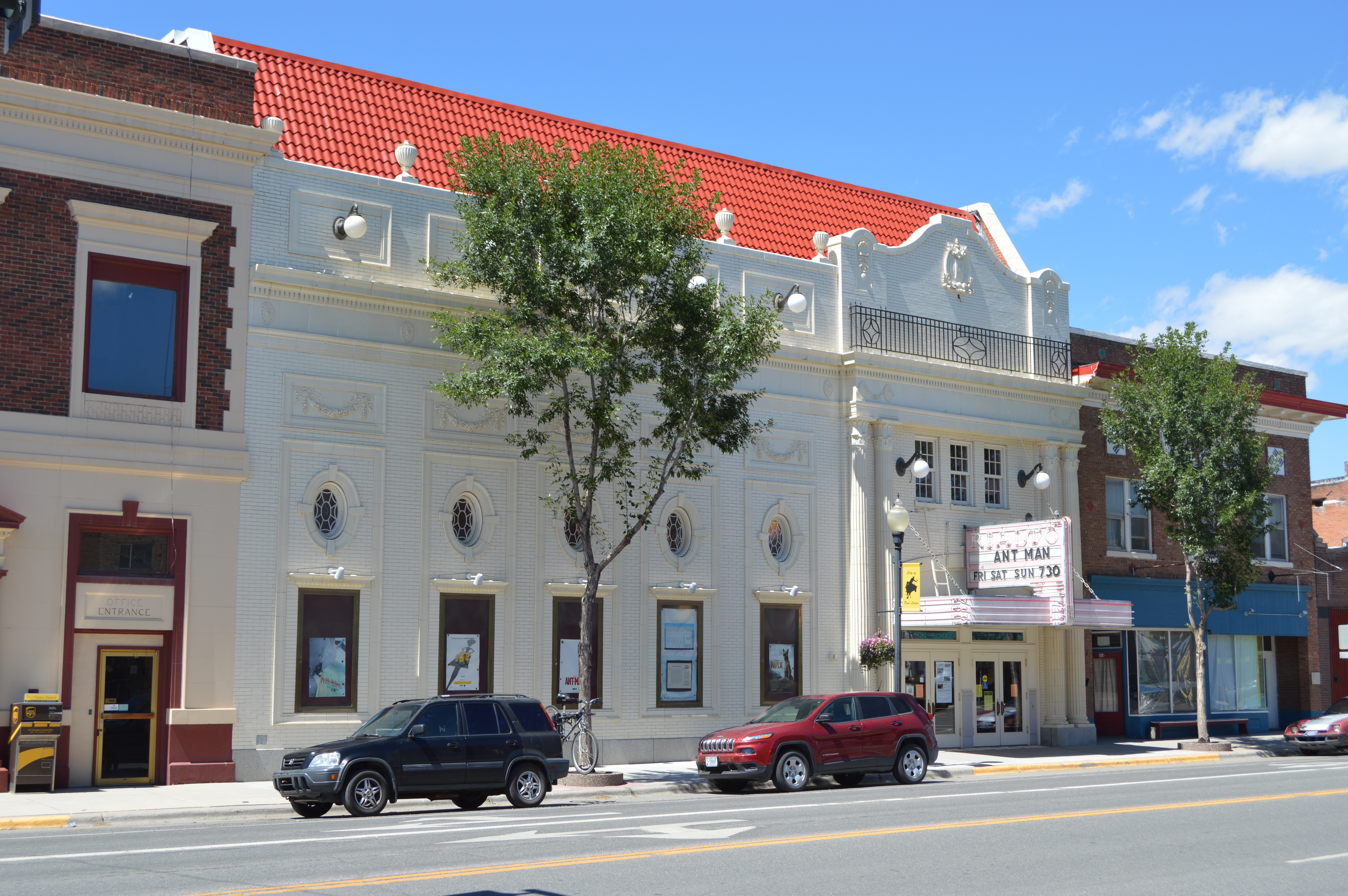

- Location within Montana Location within the United States
- Location: 418 Main St., Deer Lodge, Montana
- Coordinates: 46°24′2″N 112°44′8″W
- Built: 1921
- Architect: Arnold & Van Hausen
- Architectural style: Beaux Arts
- Website: www.deerlodgerialto.com
- Part of: Deer Lodge Central Business Historic District (ID08000767)
- NRHP reference No.: 98000124

Significant dates
- Added to NRHP: February 19, 1998
- Designated CP: August 13, 2008

The Rialto Theater in Deer Lodge, Montana was built in 1921 with 720 seats. The Beaux Arts style theater featured extensive painted murals, artistic plaster designs, and a painted stage backgrounds. The distinctive exterior used white terra cotta and red roof tiles.

The theatre was purchased in 1995 for $60,000 by a non-profit community organization that then began restoring and operating the theatre.

The Rialto was gutted by a fire on November 4, 2006, that destroyed the stage, auditorium and balcony. Rebuilding costs were originally estimated in the 6 to 8 million dollar range. The Deer Lodge community immediately began undertaking the endeavor, and the theatre was officially reopened in May 2012.

The rebuild was long and sustained and focused on historical reproduction, affordability, and practicality. The general contractor chosen, Martel Construction, was selected because of their willingness to work with volunteer labor and a long time frame.

Final costs were approximately 3.4 million dollars.

The theater is a contributing building in the Deer Lodge Central Business Historic District which was listed on the National Register in 1998.
