= Cabinet, Idaho =

Populated place in Bonner County, Idaho

Cabinet
- Populated place
- Interactive map of Cabinet
- Coordinates: 48°05′04″N 116°04′25″W
- Country: United States
- State: Idaho
- County: Bonner
- Elevation: 2,178 ft (664 m)

Population
  - Total: 1,137

Cabinet is a populated place located in Bonner County, Idaho, United States. Its elevation is 2,178 feet (664 m).

== Population ==
Its population is 1,137 with 1,085 (95.43%) White, 3 (0.26%) of Black, 19 (1.67%) Hispanic, 3 (0.26%) Asian, 14 (1.23%) Indian, and 4 (0.35%) other. There are 569 males and 568 females and a total of 592 households averaging 2.34 people per household. The average home value is $81,600 and the average income is $23,510.
