= Avon, Montana =

- CDP
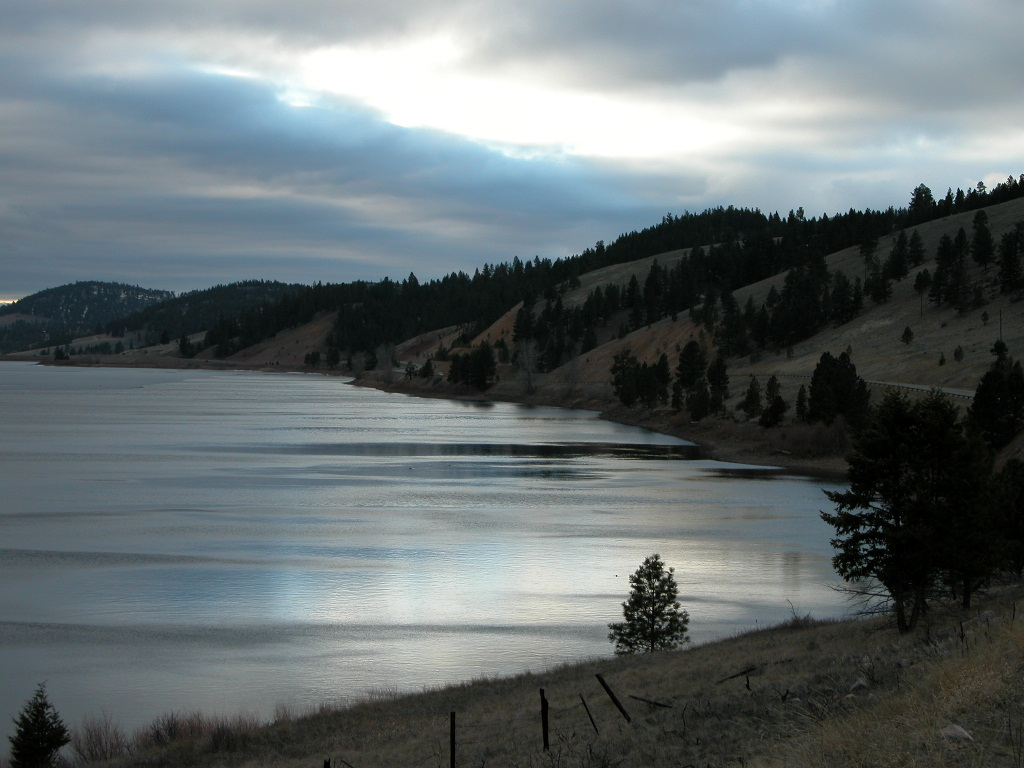

- Location of Avon, Montana
- Coordinates: 46°36′50″N 112°35′56″W
- Country: United States
- State: Montana
- County: Powell

Area
  - Total: 13.37 sq mi (34.62 km^{2})
  - Land: 13.36 sq mi (34.61 km^{2})
  - Water: 0.0039 sq mi (0.01 km^{2})
- Elevation: 5,240 ft (1,600 m)

Population (2020)
  - Total: 114
  - Density: 8.5/sq mi (3.29/km^{2})
- Time zone: UTC-7 (Mountain (MST))
  - Summer (DST): UTC-6 (MDT)
- ZIP code: 59713
- Area code: 406
- FIPS code: 30-03175
- GNIS feature ID: 2407787

Avon is a census-designated place (CDP) in Powell County, Montana, United States. As of the 2020 census, Avon had a population of 114. The town sits along the Little Blackfoot River, and serves as a gateway to the Beaverhead-Deerlodge National Forest.

The post office was opened in 1884 by Bill Cramer. The town was named Avon after the Welsh word for river. The town served as a supply point for nearby ranchers, prospectors, and miners.

The town includes the Fitzpatrick Ranch Historic District, a designated location on the National Register of Historic Places.

== Geography ==
According to the United States Census Bureau, the CDP has a total area of 13.4 square miles (35 km^{2}), all land.

== Demographics ==
Historical population
Census	Pop.	Note	%±
2000	124		—
2010	111		−10.5%
2020	114		2.7%
U.S. Decennial Census

As of the census of 2000, there were 124 people, 48 households, and 28 families residing in the CDP. The population density was 9.3 inhabitants per square mile (3.6/km^{2}). There were 62 housing units at an average density of 4.6 per square mile (1.8/km^{2}). The racial makeup of the CDP was 100.00% White.

There were 48 households, out of which 29.2% had children under the age of 18 living with them, 56.3% were married couples living together, and 39.6% were non-families. 35.4% of all households were made up of individuals, and 18.8% had someone living alone who was 65 years of age or older. The average household size was 2.58 and the average family size was 3.52.

In the CDP, the population was spread out, with 33.9% under the age of 18, 4.0% from 18 to 24, 25.0% from 25 to 44, 25.0% from 45 to 64, and 12.1% who were 65 years of age or older. The median age was 39 years. For every 100 females there were 79.7 males. For every 100 females age 18 and over, there were 90.7 males.

The median income for a household in the CDP was $25,208, and the median income for a family was $25,625. Males had a median income of $31,750 versus $22,969 for females. The per capita income for the CDP was $12,777. There were 30.8% of families and 41.2% of the population living below the poverty line, including 63.2% of under eighteens and 16.7% of those over 64.
