= Blackfoot River (Montana) =

River in Montana, United States

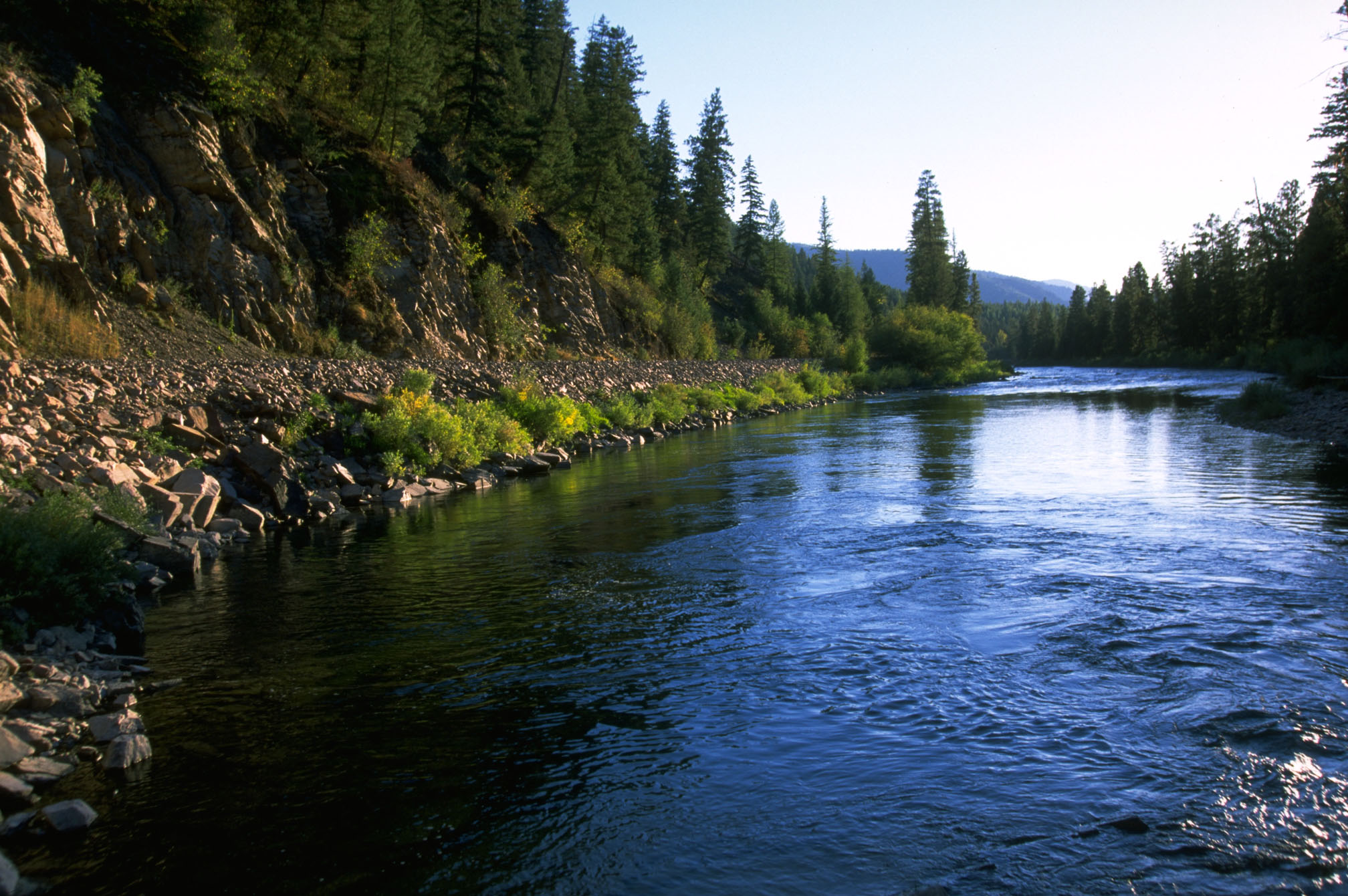
- The Blackfoot River

Location
- Country: United States
- State: Montana

Physical characteristics
- Source: Continental Divide
  - coordinates: 47°2′6″N 112°21′34″W
- Mouth: Clark Fork
  - coordinates: 46°52′17″N 113°53′18″W
- Length: 120 km (75 mi)

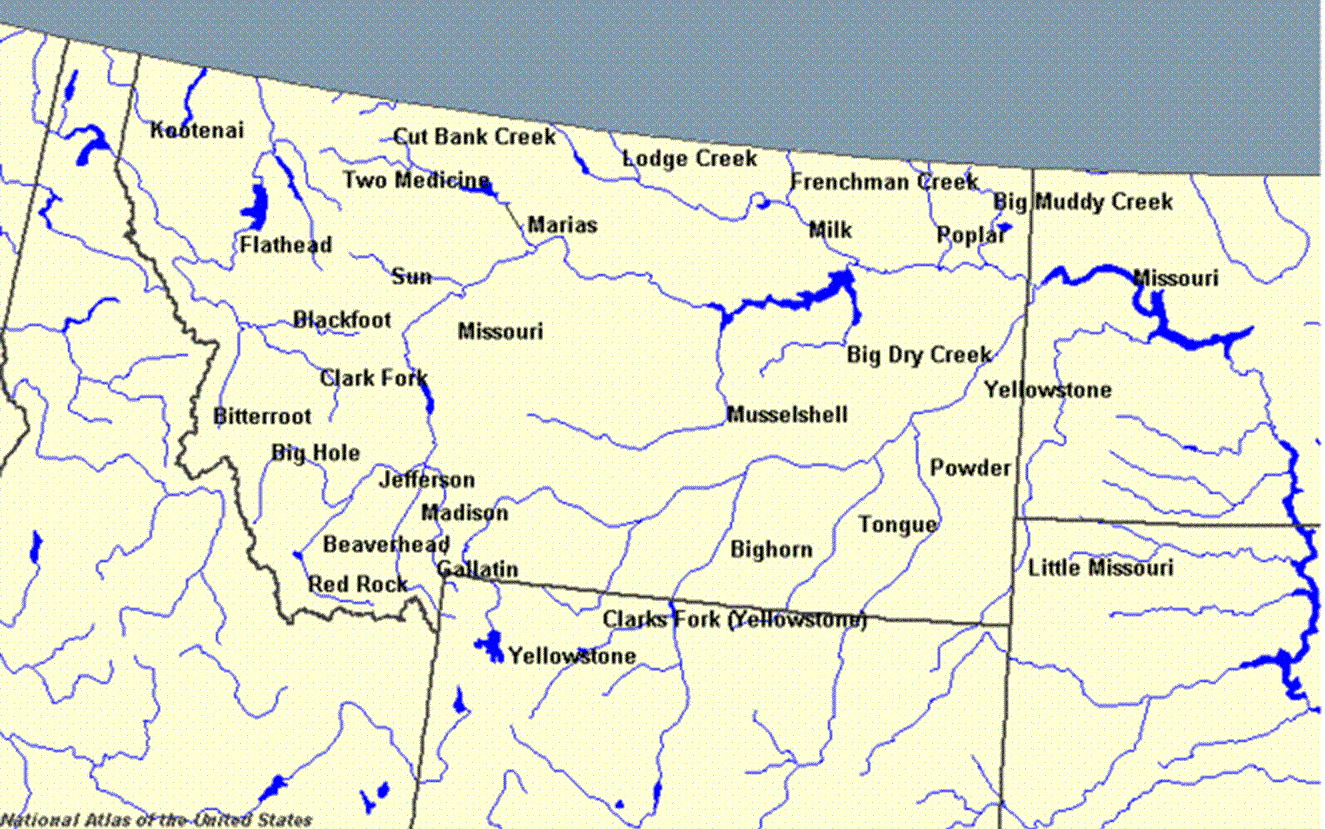
Map of principal rivers of Montana

The Blackfoot River, sometimes called the Big Blackfoot River to distinguish it from the Little Blackfoot River, is a snow-fed and spring-fed river in western Montana. The Blackfoot River begins in Lewis and Clark County at the Continental Divide, 10 miles (16 km) northeast of the town of Lincoln (4,536 ft; 1,383 m). The river's headwaters are between Rogers Pass (5,610 ft; 1,710 m) to the north and Stemple Pass (6,376 ft; 1,943 m) to the south. It flows westward through the town of Milltown and enters the Clark Fork River approximately five miles (8 km) east of the city of Missoula (3,210 ft; 980 m).

The Blackfoot River is renowned for its recreational opportunities, most notably fly fishing, but also rafting, canoeing, inner tubing, and riverside camping. The Blackfoot is a fast, cold river with many deep spots, making it prime habitat for several varieties of trout, as well as mountain whitefish and suckerfish.

The river's canyon and the valleys were formed by the Missoula Floods, cataclysmic glacial lake outburst floods which occurred at the end of the last ice age.

The Blackfoot River and the Clark Fork experienced a record flood in 1908.

The river is featured in the 1976 novella A River Runs Through It by Norman Maclean, as well as the 1992 film starring Brad Pitt, directed by Robert Redford, but was not the actual shooting location for the movie.

The Blackfoot is a Class I river from the Cedar Meadow fishing access site west of Helmville to its confluence with the Clark Fork River for public access for recreational purposes.

Drone Shot of the Blackfoot River

== See also ==
- Montana Stream Access Law
- List of rivers of Montana
