= Elliston, Montana =

- CDP
- Location of Elliston, Montana
- Coordinates: 46°33′52″N 112°28′42″W
- Country: United States
- State: Montana
- County: Powell

Area
  - Total: 8.10 sq mi (20.98 km^{2})
  - Land: 8.10 sq mi (20.98 km^{2})
  - Water: 0 sq mi (0.00 km^{2})
- Elevation: 5,410 ft (1,650 m)

Population (2020)
  - Total: 227
  - Density: 28.0/sq mi (10.82/km^{2})
- Time zone: UTC-7 (Mountain (MST))
  - Summer (DST): UTC-6 (MDT)
- ZIP code: 59728
- Area code: 406
- FIPS code: 30-23950
- GNIS feature ID: 2408076

Elliston is a census-designated place (CDP) in Powell County, Montana, United States. As of the 2020 census, Elliston had a population of 227.

The town is most likely named after Northern Pacific Railroad director John W. Ellis. By the mid-1880s, Elliston was flourishing as a center for gold and quartz mining.

== Geography ==
According to the United States Census Bureau, the CDP has a total area of 8.8 square miles (23 km^{2}), all land.

=== Climate ===
This climatic region is typified by large seasonal temperature differences, with warm to hot (and often humid) summers and cold (sometimes severely cold) winters. According to the Köppen Climate Classification system, Elliston has a humid continental climate, abbreviated "Dfb" on climate maps.

Climate data for Elliston, Montana, 1991–2020 normals, 1920-2020 extremes: 5080ft (1548m)
Month	Jan	Feb	Mar	Apr	May	Jun	Jul	Aug	Sep	Oct	Nov	Dec	Year
Record high °F (°C)	57 (14)	58 (14)	73 (23)	81 (27)	89 (32)	96 (36)	100 (38)	100 (38)	94 (34)	82 (28)	70 (21)	56 (13)	100 (38)
Mean maximum °F (°C)	49.5 (9.7)	51.2 (10.7)	60.5 (15.8)	71.6 (22.0)	79.9 (26.6)	87.7 (30.9)	94.0 (34.4)	92.3 (33.5)	88.0 (31.1)	74.5 (23.6)	60.4 (15.8)	48.1 (8.9)	92.9 (33.8)
Mean daily maximum °F (°C)	32.6 (0.3)	33.1 (0.6)	43.2 (6.2)	50.8 (10.4)	60.4 (15.8)	68.6 (20.3)	80.9 (27.2)	80.4 (26.9)	68.9 (20.5)	53.3 (11.8)	39.3 (4.1)	31.2 (−0.4)	53.6 (12.0)
Daily mean °F (°C)	21.7 (−5.7)	22.5 (−5.3)	31.2 (−0.4)	38.3 (3.5)	47.7 (8.7)	54.8 (12.7)	63.5 (17.5)	62.3 (16.8)	52.7 (11.5)	40.1 (4.5)	28.3 (−2.1)	20.8 (−6.2)	40.3 (4.6)
Mean daily minimum °F (°C)	10.7 (−11.8)	11.9 (−11.2)	19.2 (−7.1)	25.8 (−3.4)	35.0 (1.7)	41.0 (5.0)	46.0 (7.8)	44.1 (6.7)	36.4 (2.4)	27.0 (−2.8)	17.3 (−8.2)	10.4 (−12.0)	27.1 (−2.7)
Mean minimum °F (°C)	−15.8 (−26.6)	−14.6 (−25.9)	−2.7 (−19.3)	9.5 (−12.5)	21.6 (−5.8)	30.2 (−1.0)	36.6 (2.6)	34.0 (1.1)	25.5 (−3.6)	7.7 (−13.5)	−3.4 (−19.7)	−14.0 (−25.6)	−23.9 (−31.1)
Record low °F (°C)	−41 (−41)	−41 (−41)	−30 (−34)	−3 (−19)	9 (−13)	24 (−4)	24 (−4)	24 (−4)	5 (−15)	−12 (−24)	−40 (−40)	−43 (−42)	−43 (−42)
Average precipitation inches (mm)	1.12 (28)	1.04 (26)	1.37 (35)	1.77 (45)	2.49 (63)	2.79 (71)	1.45 (37)	1.39 (35)	1.40 (36)	1.76 (45)	1.48 (38)	1.05 (27)	19.11 (486)
Average snowfall inches (cm)	11.2 (28)	13.7 (35)	10.5 (27)	8.0 (20)	2.1 (5.3)	0.2 (0.51)	0.0 (0.0)	0.2 (0.51)	0.8 (2.0)	5.2 (13)	8.3 (21)	15.4 (39)	75.6 (191.32)
Source 1: NOAA
Source 2: XMACIS2 (2004-2020 snowfall, records & monthly max/mins)

== Demographics ==
Historical population
Census	Pop.	Note	%±
2000	225		—
2010	219		−2.7%
2020	227		3.7%
U.S. Decennial Census

As of the census of 2000, there were 225 people, 89 households, and 64 families residing in the CDP. The population density was 25.6 inhabitants per square mile (9.9/km^{2}). There were 104 housing units at an average density of 11.8 per square mile (4.6/km^{2}). The racial makeup of the CDP was 98.22% White, 0.89% Native American, 0.44% Asian, and 0.44% from two or more races.

There were 89 households, out of which 41.6% had children under the age of 18 living with them, 57.3% were married couples living together, 11.2% had a female householder with no husband present, and 27.0% were non-families. 22.5% of all households were made up of individuals, and 12.4% had someone living alone who was 65 years of age or older. The average household size was 2.53 and the average family size was 2.94.

In the CDP, the population was spread out, with 32.0% under the age of 18, 2.7% from 18 to 24, 28.0% from 25 to 44, 23.6% from 45 to 64, and 13.8% who were 65 years of age or older. The median age was 36 years. For every 100 females, there were 94.0 males. For every 100 females age 18 and over, there were 96.2 males.

The median income for a household in the CDP was $31,964, and the median income for a family was $38,333. Males had a median income of $33,750 versus $21,875 for females. The per capita income for the CDP was $16,501. About 7.6% of families and 10.4% of the population were below the poverty line, including 13.0% of those under the age of eighteen and 6.5% of those 65 or over.
