= Powell County, Montana =

County in Montana, United States

- County
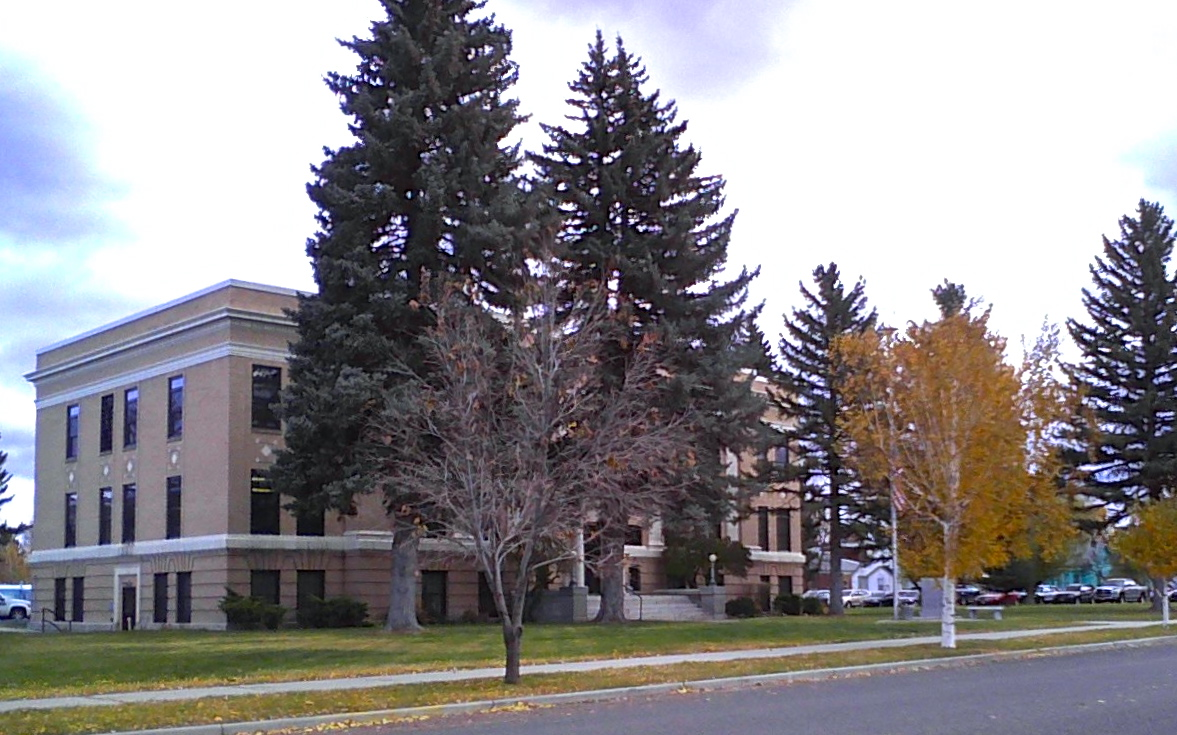
- Powell County Courthouse, Deer Lodge

- Location within the U.S. state of Montana
- Coordinates: 46°51′N 112°56′W
- Country: United States
- State: Montana
- Founded: February 2, 1901
- Named for: Mount Powell, which was named in turn for John Wesley Powell
- Seat: Deer Lodge
- Largest city: Deer Lodge

Area
  - Total: 2,333 sq mi (6,040 km^{2})
  - Land: 2,326 sq mi (6,020 km^{2})
  - Water: 6.3 sq mi (16 km^{2}) 0.3%

Population (2020)
  - Total: 6,946
  - Estimate (2025): 7,157 ▲
  - Density: 2.986/sq mi (1.153/km^{2})
- Time zone: UTC−7 (Mountain)
  - Summer (DST): UTC−6 (MDT)
- Congressional district: 1st
- Website: www.powellcountymt.gov
- Montana county number 28

Powell County is a county in the U.S. state of Montana. As of the 2020 census, the population was 6,946. Its county seat is Deer Lodge.

== Geography ==
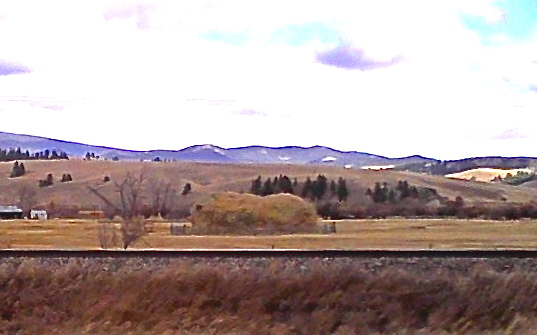
Powell County countryside, near Avon, Montana.

According to the United States Census Bureau, the county has a total area of 2,332.7 square miles (6,042 km^{2}), of which 2,326.4 square miles (6,025 km^{2}) is land and 6.3 square miles (16 km^{2}) (0.3%) is water.

=== Major highways ===
- Interstate 90
- U.S. Route 10 (Former)
- U.S. Route 12
- Montana Highway 141
- Montana Highway 200

=== Adjacent counties ===
- Flathead County - north
- Lewis and Clark County - east
- Jefferson County - southeast
- Deer Lodge County - south
- Granite County - southwest
- Missoula County - west

=== National protected areas ===
- Beaverhead-Deerlodge National Forest (part)
- Flathead National Forest (part)
- Grant-Kohrs Ranch National Historic Site
- Helena National Forest (part)
- Lolo National Forest (part)
- Bob Marshall Wilderness Area (part)
- Scapegoat Wilderness Area (part)

== Demographics ==
Historical population
| Census | Pop. | Note | %± |
|---|---|---|---|
| 1910 | 5,904 | | — |
| 1920 | 6,909 | | 17.0% |
| 1930 | 6,202 | | −10.2% |
| 1940 | 6,152 | | −0.8% |
| 1950 | 6,301 | | 2.4% |
| 1960 | 7,002 | | 11.1% |
| 1970 | 6,660 | | −4.9% |
| 1980 | 6,958 | | 4.5% |
| 1990 | 6,620 | | −4.9% |
| 2000 | 7,180 | | 8.5% |
| 2010 | 7,027 | | −2.1% |
| 2020 | 6,946 | | −1.2% |
| 2025 (est.) | 7,157 | ▲ | 3.0% |
U.S. Decennial Census; 1790–1960, 1900–1990, 1990–2000, 2010–2020

=== 2020 census ===
As of the 2020 census, the county had a population of 6,946. Of the residents, 14.8% were under the age of 18 and 21.8% were 65 years of age or older; the median age was 45.9 years. For every 100 females there were 164.6 males, and for every 100 females age 18 and over there were 180.9 males. 0.0% of residents lived in urban areas and 100.0% lived in rural areas.

The racial makeup of the county was 87.7% White, 1.0% Black or African American, 5.9% American Indian and Alaska Native, 0.3% Asian, 0.3% from some other race, and 4.8% from two or more races. Hispanic or Latino residents of any race comprised 2.3% of the population.

There were 2,374 households in the county, of which 22.9% had children under the age of 18 living with them and 22.9% had a female householder with no spouse or partner present. About 32.8% of all households were made up of individuals and 15.6% had someone living alone who was 65 years of age or older.

There were 2,900 housing units, of which 18.1% were vacant. Among occupied housing units, 69.8% were owner-occupied and 30.2% were renter-occupied. The homeowner vacancy rate was 1.8% and the rental vacancy rate was 5.2%.

=== 2010 census ===
As of the 2010 census, there were 7,027 people, 2,466 households, and 1,582 families in the county. The population density was 3.0 inhabitants per square mile (1.2/km^{2}). There were 3,105 housing units at an average density of 1.3 units per square mile (0.50 units/km^{2}). The racial makeup of the county was 92.4% white, 4.4% American Indian, 1.0% black or African American, 0.5% Asian, 0.4% from other races, and 1.3% from two or more races. Those of Hispanic or Latino origin made up 1.7% of the population. In terms of ancestry, 27.9% were German, 19.1% were Irish, 14.6% were English, 8.5% were Norwegian, and 4.7% were American.

Of the 2,466 households, 26.5% had children under the age of 18 living with them, 50.8% were married couples living together, 8.8% had a female householder with no husband present, 35.8% were non-families, and 32.2% of all households were made up of individuals. The average household size was 2.23 and the average family size was 2.79. The median age was 45.1 years.

The median income for a household in the county was $39,851 and the median income for a family was $45,339. Males had a median income of $30,163 versus $24,837 for females. The per capita income for the county was $17,849. About 12.3% of families and 17.3% of the population were below the poverty line, including 32.4% of those under age 18 and 13.0% of those age 65 or over.

== Government and infrastructure ==
The current Montana State Prison facility is located in an unincorporated area in the county, near Deer Lodge.

Powell County voters have supported Republican Party candidates in every national election since 1964.

United States presidential election results for Powell County, Montana
| Year | Republican | | Democratic | | Third party(ies) | |
| Year | No. | % | No. | % | No. | % |
|---|---|---|---|---|---|---|
| 1904 | 721 | 60.54% | 422 | 35.43% | 48 | 4.03% |
| 1908 | 599 | 49.63% | 560 | 46.40% | 48 | 3.98% |
| 1912 | 335 | 23.18% | 545 | 37.72% | 565 | 39.10% |
| 1916 | 939 | 39.75% | 1,340 | 56.73% | 83 | 3.51% |
| 1920 | 1,345 | 57.19% | 787 | 33.46% | 220 | 9.35% |
| 1924 | 982 | 40.39% | 559 | 22.99% | 890 | 36.61% |
| 1928 | 1,568 | 59.80% | 1,031 | 39.32% | 23 | 0.88% |
| 1932 | 1,031 | 34.42% | 1,869 | 62.40% | 95 | 3.17% |
| 1936 | 799 | 27.42% | 2,060 | 70.69% | 55 | 1.89% |
| 1940 | 1,116 | 38.46% | 1,765 | 60.82% | 21 | 0.72% |
| 1944 | 1,100 | 41.59% | 1,527 | 57.73% | 18 | 0.68% |
| 1948 | 1,163 | 43.49% | 1,427 | 53.37% | 84 | 3.14% |
| 1952 | 1,783 | 57.85% | 1,281 | 41.56% | 18 | 0.58% |
| 1956 | 1,683 | 58.09% | 1,214 | 41.91% | 0 | 0.00% |
| 1960 | 1,497 | 49.49% | 1,522 | 50.31% | 6 | 0.20% |
| 1964 | 1,140 | 37.50% | 1,896 | 62.37% | 4 | 0.13% |
| 1968 | 1,301 | 47.50% | 1,206 | 44.03% | 232 | 8.47% |
| 1972 | 1,720 | 59.68% | 1,050 | 36.43% | 112 | 3.89% |
| 1976 | 1,610 | 54.56% | 1,302 | 44.12% | 39 | 1.32% |
| 1980 | 1,770 | 59.14% | 883 | 29.50% | 340 | 11.36% |
| 1984 | 1,877 | 62.32% | 1,066 | 35.39% | 69 | 2.29% |
| 1988 | 1,574 | 56.31% | 1,174 | 42.00% | 47 | 1.68% |
| 1992 | 1,058 | 36.01% | 989 | 33.66% | 891 | 30.33% |
| 1996 | 1,274 | 45.47% | 952 | 33.98% | 576 | 20.56% |
| 2000 | 1,971 | 69.60% | 638 | 22.53% | 223 | 7.87% |
| 2004 | 1,993 | 70.42% | 761 | 26.89% | 76 | 2.69% |
| 2008 | 1,683 | 59.81% | 1,021 | 36.28% | 110 | 3.91% |
| 2012 | 1,806 | 65.03% | 888 | 31.98% | 83 | 2.99% |
| 2016 | 2,029 | 72.62% | 551 | 19.72% | 214 | 7.66% |
| 2020 | 2,355 | 74.08% | 752 | 23.66% | 72 | 2.26% |
| 2024 | 2,466 | 75.14% | 710 | 21.63% | 106 | 3.23% |

== Communities ==
=== City ===
- Deer Lodge (county seat)

=== Census-designated places ===
- Avon
- Elliston
- Garrison
- Goldcreek
- Helmville
- Ovando
- Racetrack

=== Other unincorporated communities ===
- Carpenter's Bar
- Danielsville
- Jens
- Pioneer
- Wall City

== Education ==
Elementary school districts include:

- Avon Elementary School District
- Deer Lodge Elementary School District
- Elliston Elementary School District
- Garrison Elementary School District
- Gold Creek Elementary School District
- Helmville Elementary School District
- Ovando Elementary School District

All areas in the county are in the Powell County High School District.

Deer Lodge School District has two components: Deer Lodge Elementary School District and Powell County High School District.

== See also ==
- List of lakes in Powell County, Montana
- List of mountains in Powell County, Montana
- National Register of Historic Places listings in Powell County, Montana
