= List of people executed in Montana (pre-1972) =

The following is a list of people executed by the U.S. state of Montana before capital punishment was resumed in the United States in 1976.

Seventy-one people, all male, were executed in Montana during the pre-Furman era, all by hanging.

== List of people executed in Montana (pre-1972) ==
No.	Name	Race	Age	Sex	Date of execution	County	Method	Victim(s)	Governor	Ref.
1	Peter Horan	White	—	Male	August 25, 1863	Beaverhead	Hanging	Lawrence Kealey	William H. Wallace	
2	William Wright Wheatley	White	27	Male	August 13, 1875	Lewis and Clark	Hanging	Franz Warl	Benjamin F. Potts	
3	William H. Stears	Black	38	Male	October 28, 1875	Lewis and Clark	Hanging	Franz Warl	Benjamin F. Potts	
4	Frank Roberts	White	17	Male	October 31, 1878	Madison	Hanging	Harry I. Morris	Benjamin F. Potts	
5	Joseph Koble	White	—	Male	October 6, 1879	Chouteau	Hanging	Patrick Farrell	Benjamin F. Potts	
6	Orlando Marsh	White	—	Male	October 6, 1879	Chouteau	Hanging	Patrick Farrell	Benjamin F. Potts	
7	Peter Pelky (Note: alias John O'Brien)	White	24	Male	February 4, 1881	Lewis and Clark	Hanging	Charles Tacke	Benjamin F. Potts	
8	John F. Douglass	White	37	Male	May 27, 1881	Madison	Hanging	Alice Earp	Benjamin F. Potts	
9	Henry Fohrman	White	69	Male	May 2, 1883	Lewis and Clark	Hanging	Jacob Kenck	John Schuyler Crosby	
10	Young Ah	Asian	—	Male	August 16, 1883	Missoula	Hanging	Asian male	John Schuyler Crosby	
11	John A. Clark	White	31	Male	December 27, 1883	Gallatin	Hanging	Thomas Rodgers	John Schuyler Crosby	
12	Thomas H. Harding	White	30	Male	March 25, 1887	Beaverhead	Hanging	George Ferguson	Preston H. Leslie	
13	Patrick John Hartt	White	24	Male	February 10, 1888	Lewis and Clark	Hanging	John W. Pitts	Preston H. Leslie	
14	Martin L. Scott	White	40	Male	February 17, 1888	Powell	Hanging	Matilda Scott (Note: His wife)	Preston H. Leslie	
15	George Duncan Bryson	White	—	Male	August 9, 1889	Jefferson	Hanging	Annie Lindstrum	Benjamin F. White	
16	Harry Roberts	White	—	Male	August 23, 1889	Silver Bow	Hanging	J.W. Crawford	Benjamin F. White	
17	Thomas King	White	37	Male	June 6, 1890	Jefferson	Hanging	Matthew Fogarty	Joseph K. Toole	
18	Antley	Native American	—	Male	December 19, 1890	Missoula	Hanging	3 victims (Note: Daniel McDonald, Benjamin Tompkins, and John Chelsey)	Joseph K. Toole	
19	See Lala	Native American	—	Male	December 19, 1890	Missoula	Hanging	2 White men	Joseph K. Toole	
20	Paul Pierre	Native American	—	Male	December 19, 1890	Missoula	Hanging	2 White men	Joseph K. Toole	
21	Pascale	Native American	—	Male	December 19, 1890	Missoula	Hanging	J. M. Dunn	Joseph K. Toole	
22	John Burns	White	—	Male	December 16, 1892	Missoula	Hanging	Maurice Higgins	Joseph K. Toole	
23	Robert Anderson	White	26	Male	July 13, 1894	Park	Hanging	Emanuel Fleming	John E. Rickards	
24	John Osnes	White	—	Male	July 13, 1894	Chouteau	Hanging	Ole Lilledall	John E. Rickards	
25	Calvin Christie	White	31	Male	December 21, 1894	Flathead	Hanging	Lena Cunningham	John E. Rickards	
26	Clay Pugh	White	24	Male	July 1, 1895	Jefferson	Hanging	C. T. Wheat	John E. Rickards	
27	Joseph Cadotte	Native American	—	Male	December 27, 1895	Chouteau	Hanging	Oliver Richards	John E. Rickards	
28	John Biggerstaff	Black	—	Male	April 6, 1896	Lewis and Clark	Hanging	Richard Johnson	John E. Rickards	
29	William Gay	White	52	Male	June 8, 1896	Lewis and Clark	Hanging	James Mackey	John E. Rickards	
30	Thomas Salmon	White	—	Male	January 27, 1899	Carbon	Hanging	William O'Connor	Robert B. Smith	
31	Joseph Allen	White	21	Male	September 14, 1899	Lewis and Clark	Hanging	E. C. Leach	Robert B. Smith	
32	William Brooks	Black	—	Male	November 24, 1899	Yellowstone	Hanging	Jennie Brooks	Robert B. Smith	
33	William Calder	White	27	Male	March 18, 1900	Fergus	Hanging	2 victims (Note: Farquhar McRae and John Allen)	Robert B. Smith	
34	Joseph Hurst	White	—	Male	March 29, 1900	Dawson	Hanging	Dominic Cavanaugh	Robert B. Smith	
35	William Pepo	White	48	Male	April 6, 1900	Teton	Hanging	Julius Plath	Robert B. Smith	
36	Daniel Lucey	White	42	Male	September 14, 1900	Silver Bow	Hanging	Patrick Reagan	Robert B. Smith	
37	Jim Fleming	White	—	Male	September 6, 1901	Powell	Hanging	Oliver Dotson (Note: Clinton's father)	Joseph K. Toole	
38	Clint Dotson	White	—	Male	April 4, 1902	Powell	Hanging	Oliver Dotson	Joseph K. Toole	
39	James Martin	White	—	Male	February 23, 1904	Silver Bow	Hanging	John R. Williams	Joseph K. Toole	
40	Louis Mott	White	—	Male	March 18, 1904	Missoula	Hanging	Mrs. Mott (Note: His wife)	Joseph K. Toole	
41	Herbert Metzger	White	—	Male	May 5, 1905	Meagher	Hanging	Homer Ward	Joseph K. Toole	
42	Sing Lu	Asian	—	Male	April 20, 1906	Gallatin	Hanging	Tom Sing	Joseph K. Toole	
43	Miles Fuller	White	66	Male	May 18, 1906	Silver Bow	Hanging	Henry J. Gallahan	Joseph K. Toole	
44	George Rock	White	35	Male	June 15, 1908	Powell	Hanging	John A. Robinson	Edwin L. Norris	
45	Frederick LeBeau	White	—	Male	April 2, 1909	Flathead	Hanging	2 victims (Note: William F. and Riley Yoakum)	Edwin L. Norris	
46	William Hayes	White	—	Male	April 7, 1909	Powell	Hanging	John A. Robinson	Edwin L. Norris	
47	Henry Hall	Black	—	Male	February 16, 1917	Meagher	Hanging	Michael Freeman	Samuel V. Stewart	
48	Harrison Gibson	Black	—	Male	February 16, 1917	Meagher	Hanging	Michael Freeman	Samuel V. Stewart	
49	Leslie Fahley	Black	—	Male	February 16, 1917	Meagher	Hanging	Michael Freeman	Samuel V. Stewart	
50	Sherman Powell	Black	—	Male	January 14, 1918	Silver Bow	Hanging	J. A. Montgomery	Samuel V. Stewart	
51	John O'Neill	White	—	Male	January 14, 1918	Silver Bow	Hanging	Thomas Higgins	Samuel V. Stewart	
52	Frank Fisher	White	—	Male	January 14, 1918	Silver Bow	Hanging	Thomas Higgins	Samuel V. Stewart	
53	John Cuellae	Hispanic	30	Male	April 12, 1918	Yellowstone	Hanging	Enos Nelson	Samuel V. Stewart	
54	Alfred Lane	White	36	Male	September 3, 1920	Rosebud	Hanging	Harry Theade	Samuel V. Stewart	
55	Albert Yick	White	29	Male	August 26, 1921	Beaverhead	Hanging	Cyrus King Wyman	Joseph M. Dixon	
56	Joe Vuckovich	White	34	Male	February 17, 1922	Missoula	Hanging	Mrs. Jerry Shea	Joseph M. Dixon	
57	Joseph Reagin	White	22	Male	February 9, 1923	Treasure	Hanging	Irving Keeler	Joseph M. Dixon	
58	Glenna Bolton	White	29	Male	February 9, 1923	Treasure	Hanging	Irving Keeler	Joseph M. Dixon	
59	William Harris	White	—	Male	April 20, 1923	Silver Bow	Hanging	Cyril Schilling	Joseph M. Dixon	
60	Monte Harris	White	23	Male	April 20, 1923	Silver Bow	Hanging	Cyril Schilling	Joseph M. Dixon	
61	Seth Danner	White	—	Male	July 18, 1924	Gallatin	Hanging	2 victims (Note: Mr. and Mrs. John Sprouse)	Joseph M. Dixon	
62	Roy Walsh	White	22	Male	February 15, 1925	Jefferson	Hanging	A. S. Johnson	John E. Erickson	
63	Tony Vettere	White	—	Male	January 1, 1926	Silver Bow	Hanging	2 victims (Note: Joe Ciccarelli and Antone Favero)	John E. Erickson	
64	Ferdinand Schlaps	White	19	Male	May 20, 1927	Roosevelt	Hanging	Ludmilla Geisler	John E. Erickson	
65	Rollin Davisson	White	44	Male	November 6, 1929	Park	Hanging	2 victims (Note: Peter Holte and Martin Zollman)	John E. Erickson	
66	George Hoffman	White	45	Male	August 29, 1933	Chouteau	Hanging	George Burrell	Frank Henry Cooney	
67	Henry Zorn	White	26	Male	April 24, 1935	Custer	Hanging	Lester C. Jones	Frank Henry Cooney	
68	George Griner	Black	38	Male	January 16, 1935	Custer	Hanging	James Fraser	Frank Henry Cooney	
69	Franklin Robideau	White	49	Male	January 15, 1938	Stillwater	Hanging	2 victims (Note: Mike and Frieda Kuntz)	Roy E. Ayers	
70	Lee Simpson	White	52	Male	December 30, 1939	Golden Valley	Hanging	3 victims (Note: Gerald and Robert McDonald, Arthur Burford)	Roy E. Ayers	
71	Phillip Coleman Jr.	Black	24	Male	September 10, 1943	Missoula	Hanging	2 victims (Note: Carl W. Pearson and Roslyn Pearson) (Note: Suspected serial killer, confessed to 21 other murders, one of which could be verified.)	Samuel C. Ford	

== Demographics ==
Race
White	54	76%
Black	9	13%
Native American	5	7%
Asian	2	3%
Hispanic	1	1%
Age
17-19	2	3%
20-29	14	20%
30–39	11	15%
Unknown age	34	48%
40–49	6	8%
50-59	2	3%
60-69	2	3%
Gender
Male	71	100%
Female	0	0%
Date of execution
1860–1869	1	1%
1870–1879	5	7%
1880–1889	10	14%
1890–1899	16	23%
1900–1909	14	20%
1910–1919	7	10%
1920–1929	12	17%
1930–1939	5	7%
1940–1949	1	1%
Method
Hanging	71	100%
Governor (Party)
William H. Wallace (R)	1	1%
Benjamin F. Potts (D)	7	10%
John Schuyler Crosby (R)	3	4%
Preston H. Leslie (D)	3	4%
Benjamin F. White (R)	2	3%
Joseph K. Toole (D)	13	18%
John E. Rickards (R)	7	10%
Robert B. Smith (F)	7	10%
Edwin L. Norris (D)	3	4%
Samuel V. Stewart (D)	8	11%
Joseph M. Dixon (R)	7	10%
John E. Erickson (D)	4	6%
Frank Henry Cooney (D)	3	4%
Roy E. Ayers (D)	2	3%
Samuel C. Ford (R)	1	1%

== See also ==
- Capital punishment in the United States
- Capital punishment in Montana
- Lists of people executed in the United States
- List of people executed in Montana
