= Montana State Prison =

- Montana Territorial and State Prison
- U.S. National Register of Historic Places
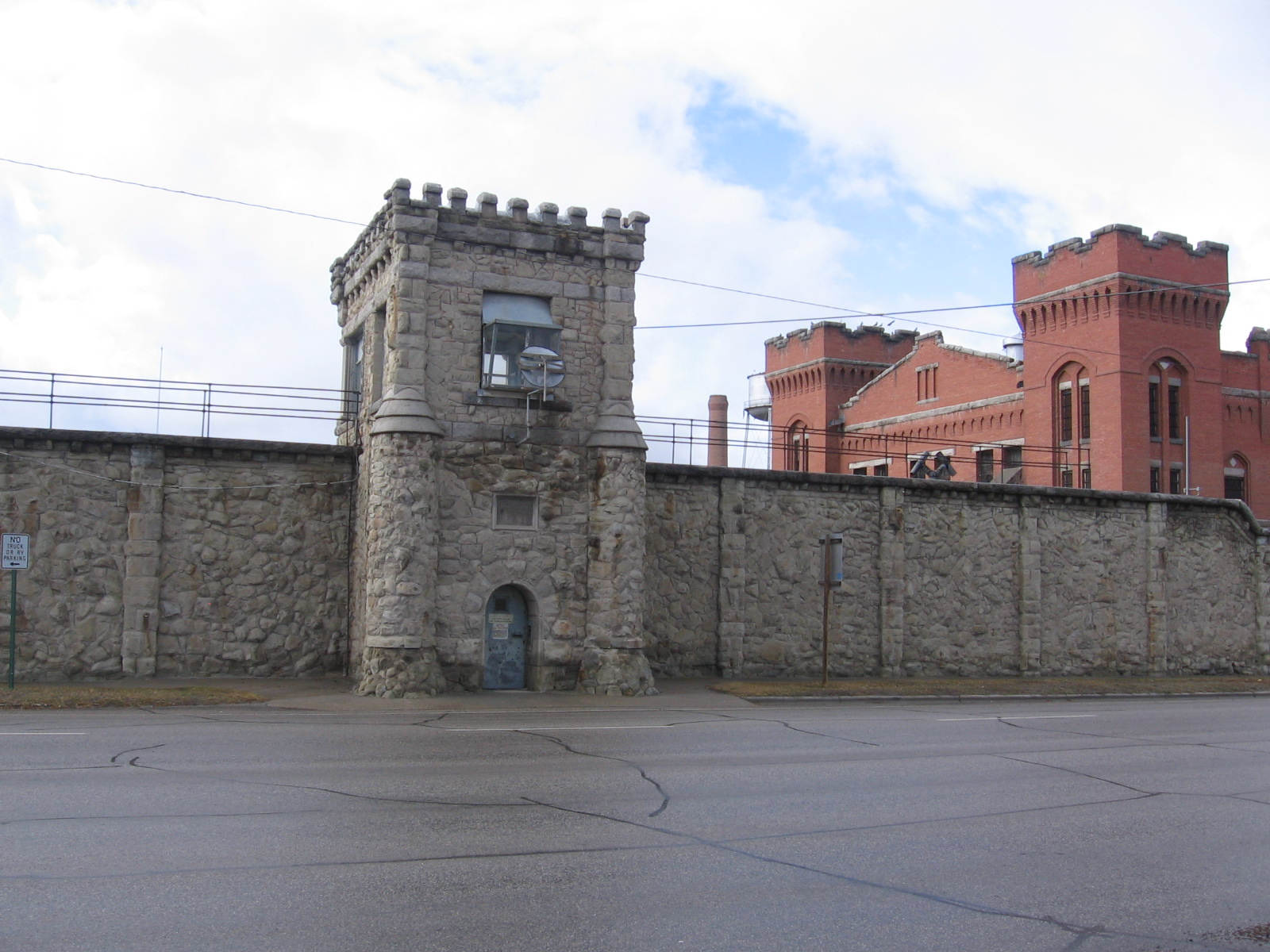
- Old Montana Prison main entrance

- Location within Montana
- Location: Old: 925 Main Street, Deer Lodge, Montana; New: 700 Conley Lake Road, Powell County, near Deer Lodge, Montana
- Coordinates: 46°22′58″N 112°48′04″W
- Built: 1871
- Built by: Convicts
- Architect: Link & Haire
- Architectural style: Romanesque
- NRHP reference No.: 76001126
- Added to NRHP: September 3, 1976

The Montana State Prison is an American men's correctional facility of the Montana Department of Corrections in unincorporated Powell County, Montana, about 3.5 miles (5.6 km) west of Deer Lodge. The current facility was constructed between 1974 and 1979 in response to the continued degeneration of the original facility located in downtown Deer Lodge.

The "Old Prison" (46°23′33″N 112°44′10″W) served as the Montana Territorial Prison from its creation in 1871 until Montana achieved statehood in 1889, then continued as the primary penal institution for the State of Montana until 1979. Throughout the prison's history, the institution was plagued with constant overcrowding, insufficient funds, and antiquated facilities. The administration of Warden Frank Conley from 1890 to 1921 proved the exception to this rule, as Warden Conley instituted extensive inmate labor projects that kept many inmates at work constructing the prison buildings and walls as well as providing various state and community services like road building, logging, and ranching.

After Conley left office, the prison experienced almost forty years of degeneration, mismanagement, and monetary restraints until an explosive riot in 1959 captured the attention of the nation. Led by Jerry Myles and Lee Smart, the riot maintained the prison under inmate control for thirty-six hours before the Montana National Guard stormed the institution to restore order. The facility was retired in September 1979, and the inmates were moved to the current prison. The Old Prison was added to the National Register of Historic Places in 1976 and is now a museum.

== Territorial prison ==
=== Facility history ===
In response to rampant lawlessness and the vigilante-style form of justice present in the newly formed Montana Territory, in 1867 the US Congress allotted $40,000 to Montana for the express purpose of constructing a territorial prison. On November 19, 1867, the territorial government chose Deer Lodge as the site of the facility, and on June 2, 1870, the cornerstone was laid. The original plans for the building called for a structure which held three tiers of fourteen cells, but due to the difficulty of acquiring materials, the cost to ship those materials, and the expense of hiring labor, the new building would house only one of the three tiers. On July 2, 1871, US Marshal William Wheeler took possession of the first nine prisoners to be incarcerated in the facility.

It only took a single month before the prison was overcrowded; by August, six more prisoners had arrived. The burgeoning population was quelled somewhat when, in June 1874, another tier of fourteen cells was constructed, and the civilians of Deer Lodge were calmed when a twelve foot board fence went up in 1875. The prison's population continued to grow, so Congress allocated an additional $15,000 for the construction of another tier of cells, but the soft brick of the building could not support any more weight. Instead, the money went into an administration building with guard barracks, a warden's office, and a visitor's reception. Finally, in 1885, $25,000 served to provide the prison with a three-story cellblock with 42 double-occupancy cells which was completed in 1886. The Montana Territorial Prison was finally completed to original specifications, just in time to be handed over to the new State of Montana in March 1890.

=== Prison life ===
The system of managing inmates at the Montana Territorial Prison was intended to follow the Auburn system of penal reform, a method pioneered at Auburn Prison in New York state in the 1820s. The Auburn system, or the silent system, hinged on prisoners working in groups during the day, maintaining solitary confinement at night, and adhering to a strict code of silence at all times. This rehabilitation method was doomed to fail in Montana, primarily due to the severe overcrowding which plagued the facility from the start.

Within a month of the prison opening its doors, the building was overcrowded. This state of affairs persisted throughout the territorial years, reaching its peak in 1885. In that year, 120 inmates were incarcerated at the institution which claimed only 28 cells, or four inmates per cell. Inmates camped on the prison grounds, but it wasn't until the completion of the 1886 cell block with its 42 double-occupancy cells and a round of generous paroles that the prison felt relief.

Although the completion of the cell block meant a roof over a prisoner's head, the amenities of the facility were sparse. The cells measured 6 ft (1.8 m) × 8 ft (2.4 m), were constructed of soft brick, and had no plumbing or artificial lights. The building had no heating or ventilation, and, in a region which often experienced temperatures below −30 °F (−34 °C) in the winter and above 100 °F (38 °C) in the summer, this made for very uncomfortable tenants. To alleviate the discomfort, the administration used wood stoves to heat the building and oil lamps to light it, the smoke from which combined with the stench of bucketed human waste and unwashed bodies to make the environment rank.

The prison hired a physician to keep the inmates somewhat healthy but provided no pharmaceuticals; any drugs required to administer to the inmates had to be purchased using his own salary. Between May and November 1873, the overworked doctor reported 67 illnesses in a population of 21 inmates, or about three maladies per prisoner during a span of six months. These sicknesses can be mostly attributed to the crowded, unsanitary conditions of the prison itself and to the poor quality of food provided to the inmates. Since the prison was operating on a shoestring budget, it had to feed the inmates with what the territory could provide. Therefore, few fruits and vegetables found their way into the diet, and the inmates made do with a menu heavy in proteins and starch.

== Warden Conley years ==
Montana became a state in November 1889, but the fledgling state had neither the will nor the money to assume possession of the prison until March 1890. The facility was a money-sink, costing over $2 per day per inmate to run, an eyesore, and an administerial nightmare. Montana decided to do what many other states at the time were doing; they contracted the running of the prison to a pair of men who offered to care for the inmates at the rate of $.70 per day per inmate for the first 100, and $1.00 per day for each inmate over. These men were the warden of the facility since 1885, Thomas McTague, and his partner, Guard Frank Conley.

=== Warden Frank Conley ===
Born on 28 February 1864 in Havre de Grace, Maryland, Frank Conley set off for the American West at the age of sixteen and landed in Montana, working to create what would later become Yellowstone National Park. By 1884, he was a member of the Central Montana Vigilance Committee and later became Deputy Sheriff of Custer County, Montana. In 1886, he supervised a prisoner transport to Deer Lodge, and, upon learning of a vacancy in the ranks of the guards, immediately took the post. In March 1890, he ascended to the position of Warden of the Montana State Prison, while McTague remained more-or-less aloof from the administration of the prison, focusing his attentions on the financial backing of the institution. Conley oversaw everything else and launched a series of projects which made the Montana State Prison function.

=== Conley builds ===
Possibly the most important, or at least longest lasting, contribution Warden Conley made to the Montana State Prison are the plethora of buildings he left in his wake. He believed that idleness bred insurrection, so he set about using prison labor to build the prison.

At first, Conley focused on bettering the prison facility. Immediately after taking the position of warden, he put the inmates to work to build a log cell-house to alleviate the rampant overcrowding. The building housed 150 inmates in one large room in two tiers of wooden bunks, and was used on and off over the course of the next decade.

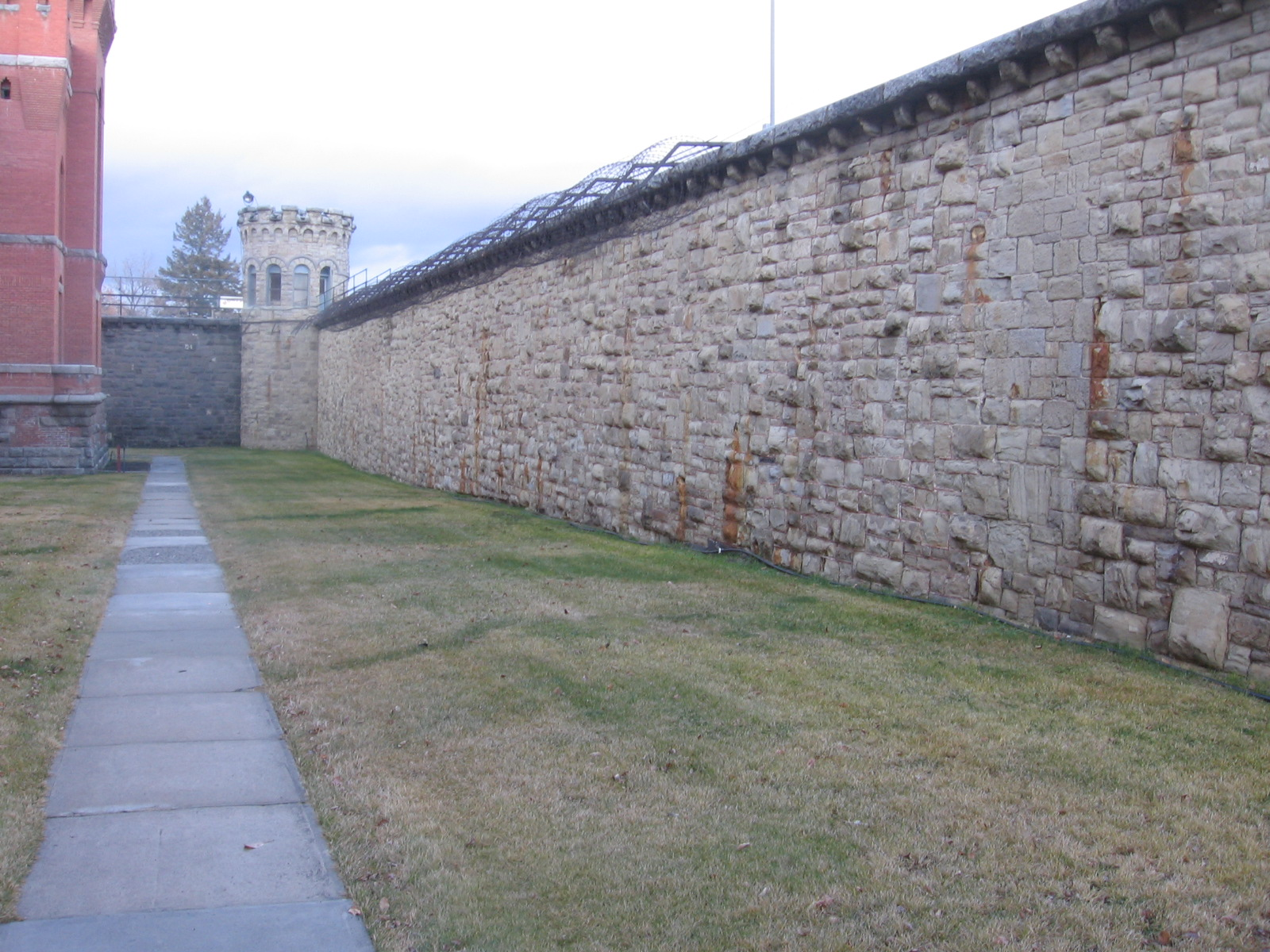
Convict-constructed sandstone wall

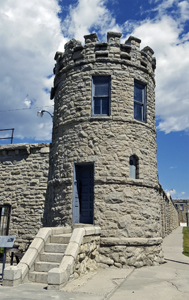
Montana Territory Prison Museum, Deer Lodge

Conley waited for a few years before starting one of his biggest projects—the prison walls. In 1893, he put his prisoners to work to construct the 20 to 22 ft (6.7 m) high walls which extended underground for four feet and were 3 1/2 ft. thick underground and tapered to two feet thick at the top. The wall was constructed of locally quarried sandstone mined, shaped, mortared, and placed by prison labor. The walls had six towers, a sally port to admit vehicles, and a smaller portal to admit people. The imposing structure with its crenellated towers dominates the southern end of Main Street Deer Lodge and resembles a medieval castle.

In 1896, Conley deemed the old Territorial Penitentiary insufficient, even after remodeling it to house 164 inmates, so he constructed the first of two cellblocks. The 1896 Cellblock bordered the Territorial building on its southern side and could house 256 inmates in four tiers of thirty-two cells, each measuring 6 ft (1.8 m) long, 8 ft (2.4 m) deep, and 7 ft 4 in (2.24 m) tall. None of these cells had plumbing, however, and inmates again used the bucket system: one for fresh water, the other for human waste. Each door locked individually, which, when combined with the wood stoves which heated the building and the wooden roof, created a safety hazard in the case of a fire. Electricity didn't enter the building until after the start of the 20th century, but this building was a marked improvement from the antiquated Territorial building.

In 1902, in response to concerns over women's rights, Conley built a separate building outside the walls for his female prisoners. It was a small, stuffy building with no plumbing and a tiny exercise yard, but it gave the women inmates a degree of separation and safety they had previously been denied. This building would eventually be converted into a maximum security facility in 1959 in response to the riot which happened in that year, and Montana's women prisoners would eventually be moved to their own prison.

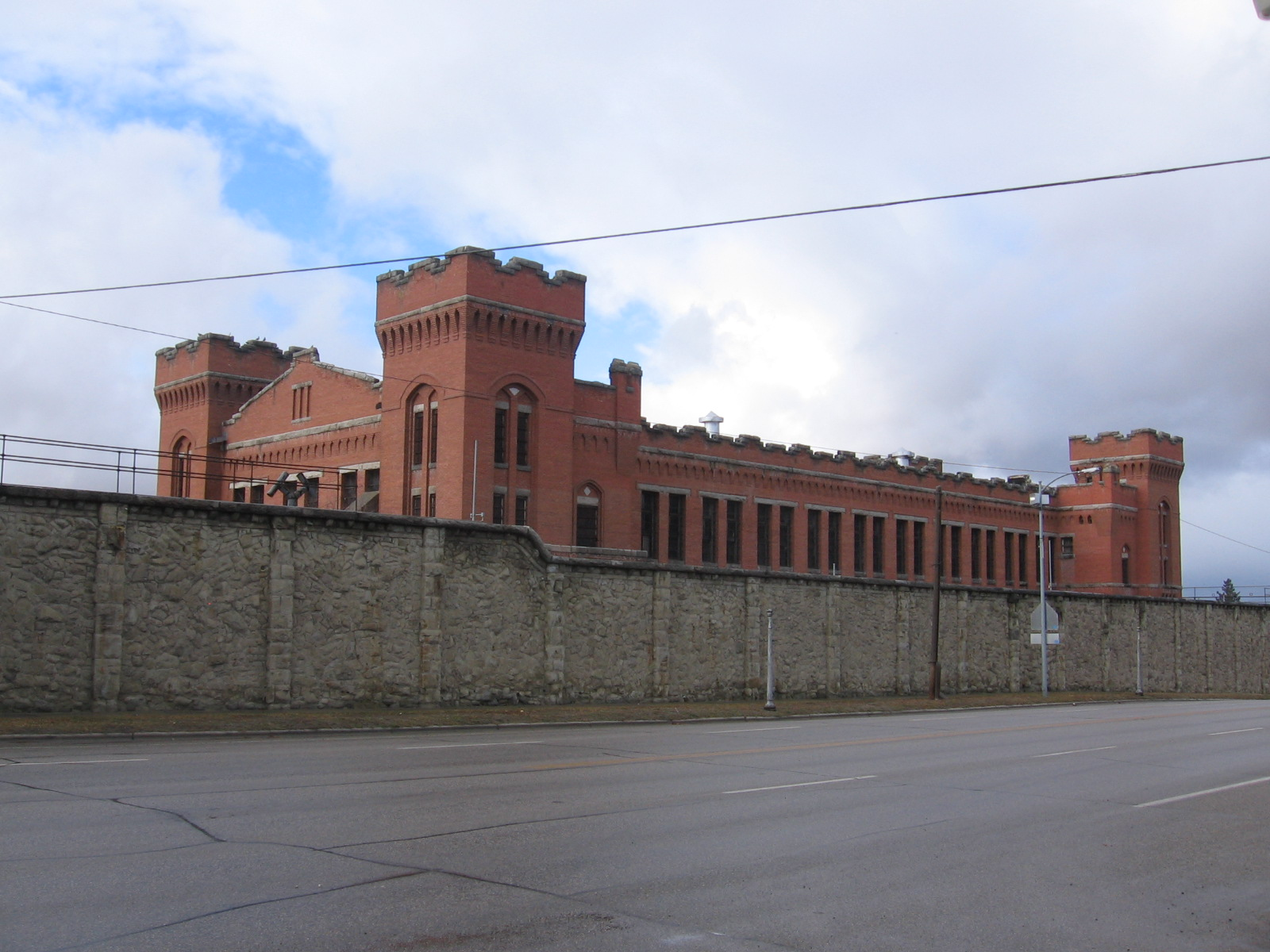
1912 Cellblock from Main Street

1911 saw an extension of the original walls by 48,000 sq ft (4,500 m^{2}). Tower Seven, in the middle of the eastern wall which bordered Main Street, became the main entrance to the prison and would remain so until the facility closed.

To respond to the ever-increasing number of inmates flooding the Montana correctional system, in 1912 Conley supervised the building of another cellblock. Called "Cellblock 1" by guards and prisoners, the building sandwiched the old Territorial building between itself and the 1896 cellblock, now called "Cellblock 2". The building was made of cut granite and prison-made brick, could house 400 prisoners in 200 cells along two corridors of four tiers of 25 cells each, and came complete with a sink and self-flushing toilet in each cell, a ventilation system, and a door-locking system which could open any combination of doors simultaneously.

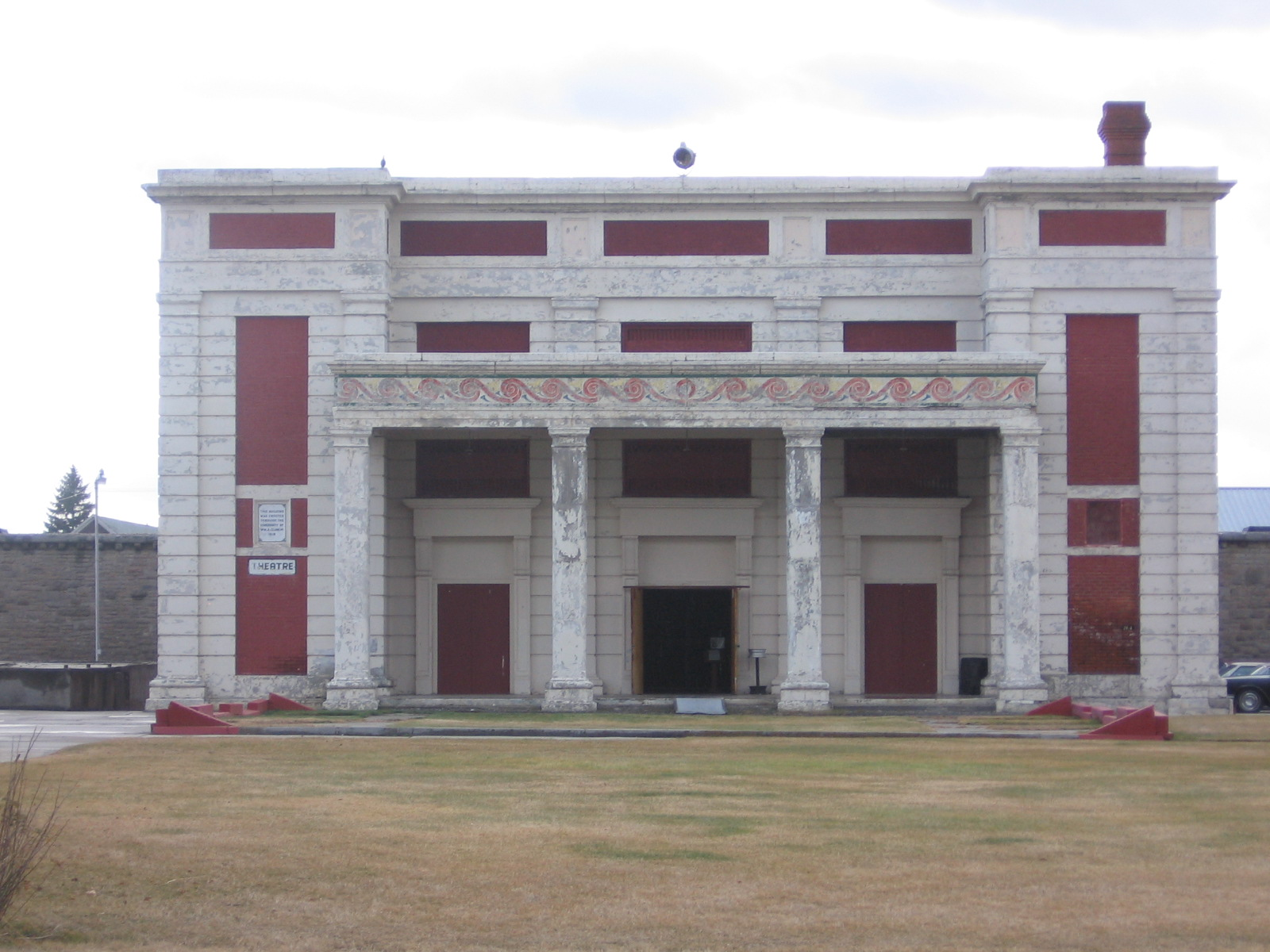
WA Clark Theatre

In 1919, Warden Conley's personal friend William A. Clark, one of Butte, Montana's Copper Kings, donated $10,000 for the construction of a first in US Prison history—a prison theater. Dubbed the WA Clark Theatre, the pride of the Montana State Prison was completed in March 1920. It boasted seating for 1,000 people in leather-covered seats and catered to prisoners and members of the community alike. It hosted concerts, plays, prizefights, movies, and more. For Conley, it became an instant disciplinary tool; unruly inmates were denied access to the theater. The theater was a mainstay of prison life until its destruction by an unknown arsonist on 3 December 1975.

Though the buildings inside the prison grounds were extensive and labor and time consuming, Warden Conley did not stop there. During his tenure as warden, he used prison labor to run eleven separate ranches which produced beef, pork, poultry, and dairy products for prison use, a prison farm which produced vegetables for the inmates and feed for the animals on the ranches, and a slaughterhouse. He also built and operated a brickyard which could produce up to 60,000 bricks per day. His prisoners were also loggers, and they processed their lumber at a lumberyard and sawmill they had built. Conley also assisted the state by using inmate labor to build 11 buildings of the Montana State Hospital in Warm Springs, 4 buildings for the Montana State Tuberculosis Sanatorium in Galen, and over 500 miles (800 km) of roads in the State. About road building, Conley stated:

The work done by the men in the way of road construction is itself of inestimable value to the state and counties; and greater still are the benefits derived by the prisoners. The outside work, the absence of physical restraint, and the trust and confidence instill in each man a sense of pride, both for himself and for his work. He values his advantages and his privileges. He does not brood and ponder over his sufferings and wrongs, his failures and disappointments. He awakens to a new appreciation of life and determines to make a better future.

His garb was in tatters, his beard an ugly stubble, his eyes bloodshot. He had the gauntiness [sic] in feature of a wasted consumptive. He was shackled. He was a man of stalwart frame, but his bony hands looked ugly. He might as well have been three weeks out of the world…For a time, in the prison yard, he acted like one who was an utter stranger to this earth.

==== Escape attempts ====
Perhaps in response to punishment like the hole, some prisoners strove to escape. In 1902, the inmate stable boss of a barn outside the walls named Thomas O'Brien drugged Conley's dogs, used for hunting and tracking down escaped convicts, stole Conley's prized racehorse, and escaped. O'Brien ended up leaving the horse, bridle, and saddle in a nearby pasture and disappeared for 18 days, after which he turned himself in. He was paroled in 1903 and quickly published a controversial book, Infamy Immortal, describing his treatment at the hands of Conley. The book caused a minor stir, but nothing came of it.

A more serious escape attempt happened in 1908 that left Deputy Warden Robinson dead and Warden Conley severely wounded. It was Conley's habit to hold what he called a "warden's court" each morning where inmates could air their grievances. At 6 ft 6 in (1.98 m) tall and weighing roughly 300 lb (140 kg), Warden Frank Conley was an imposing man, and he considered himself more than a match for the men he maintained. What his physical bulk could not handle, the .41 caliber pistol he habitually carried would. He was shown just how vulnerable he was when, on the morning of 8 March, Deputy John A. Robinson admitted the men lined up to speak with the warden and was rushed by four men, W.A. Hayes, C.B. Young, Oram Stevens, and George Rock. Hayes managed to get past Robinson and burst into Conley's office, waving a knife and threatening the warden. Conley drew his pistol and fired twice, hitting Hayes in the ear. The remaining three inmates rushed in and Conley fired again, hitting George Rock, who retreated from the office. Hayes got back to his feet, and Conley shot him again and threw him into the hall after Rock. Conley then went to help Robinson, who was on the ground under Rock. Rock had already slashed the Deputy's throat and was stabbing him when Conley threw a chair at the assailant, who turned on Conley. The warden fended the armed man off with the butt of his now empty pistol, and the escape attempt was ended at the end of a billy-club wielded by Guard E.H. Carver, who had had to break through the locked door to the hallway.

Deputy Robinson had been killed, and it took 103 stitches to stabilize Warden Conley. One of the slashes from Rock's blade had come a mere eighth of an inch from severing the warden's jugular, and he carried the scar from that wound to his deathbed. None of the rioters had died, and Conley made sure they were all fully healed before bringing them up on charges. Rock and Hayes were both given the death sentence for the assault, Stevens won his acquittal and served his original sentence, and Young's was extended to a life sentence. Conley oversaw both of the executions (Rock on 16 June 1908 and Hayes on 2 April 1909). The men were hanged using the upright jerker method, which used a 300 lb (140 kg) weight to jerk the sentenced man from his feet. This method was supposed to snap the neck, but it failed in both instances. Rock and Hayes were the only two men to be executed within the prison walls.

==== Conley's downfall ====
In addition to the problems Conley had with prisoners, the community began to complain of his use of prisoners and the office of warden for personal gain. When he arrived in Deer Lodge, he had been a lowly deputy, but within twenty years had risen to be one of the most powerful men in the region. Through the years, he had become personal friends with William A. Clark, and through him the Anaconda Copper Mining Company, a subsidiary of John D. Rockefeller's Standard Oil. Conley moved up the social stratus with his marriage to a Missoula, Montana socialite. While using prison labor to construct the prison itself, roads for the state, and buildings for state institutions, he had also found a way to have the inmates build him an expensive warden's residence across Main Street from the prison, a hunting lodge on the shores of his private lake and another for Thomas McTague, and a racetrack where he ran his own thoroughbreds. He also used the produce of the prison ranch and farm to entertain guests like Theodore Roosevelt, Franklin D. Roosevelt, Secretary of the Treasury William Gibbs McAdoo, several Montana governors, and, of course, Copper King William Clark and a number of directors of the Anaconda Mining company. At these events, he commonly used prisoners as cooks, waiters, and servants.

Warden of the Montana State Prison was not the only office Frank Conley held; he was voted Mayor of Deer Lodge from 1892–1893, 1895–1903, and again from 1907–1929, a position he held for eight years after being removed from his duties as warden. The man responsible for Conley's downfall was Governor Joseph M. Dixon. Dixon took office under the promise to remove the powerful Ananconda Mining company from state politics, and, upon hearing that the warden of the state prison was heavily involved with the Company, he launched a series of investigations and audits which laid bare the extent of Warden Conley's corruption between 1908 and 1921. Some points Dixon's auditor found were:

1. Appropriating beef, assorted groceries and produce, cream, and butter for his private use in the amount of some $8,330;
2. Using over a half million tons of state coal for his private residence;
3. Using and maintaining thirteen private autos at state expense, running up a gas, oil, and maintenance bill of over $12,000 per year on the vehicles;
4. Using the prison's ranch to feed his private dairy herd and employing free inmate labor to care for and feed his livestock; and
5. Selling to the state (for use in the prison), dairy products and beef produced by the herd, at market rates

Dixon wasted no time in bringing Conley to trial on charges of corruption. The judge, however, could find no written statute which fully defined the relationship the state of Montana shared with Frank Conley, and so could find no laws Conley had broken. In the words of the judge, "every act of Conely…was in the interest of the state of Montana".

Although stripped of the influential office of warden, Conley continued as Mayor of Deer Lodge until 1929, and lived in the city until his death in Butte on 5 March 1939.

== Degeneration of the facility ==
Immediately after the retirement of Warden Conley, the first in a long string of gubernatorial appointees, Warden M.W. Potter, strove to keep the prison functioning on a cost-effective basis. He pardoned a significant number of prisoners incarcerated during World War I and the early years of the Prohibition to keep overcrowding to a minimum and costs down. However, without Conley and his series of contacts to keep the prisoners busy, the number of extramural work programs dwindled, forcing more inmates to return to the facility. The prisoners were now faced with a heavily crowded living space that was not well suited to house them.

=== Buildings ===
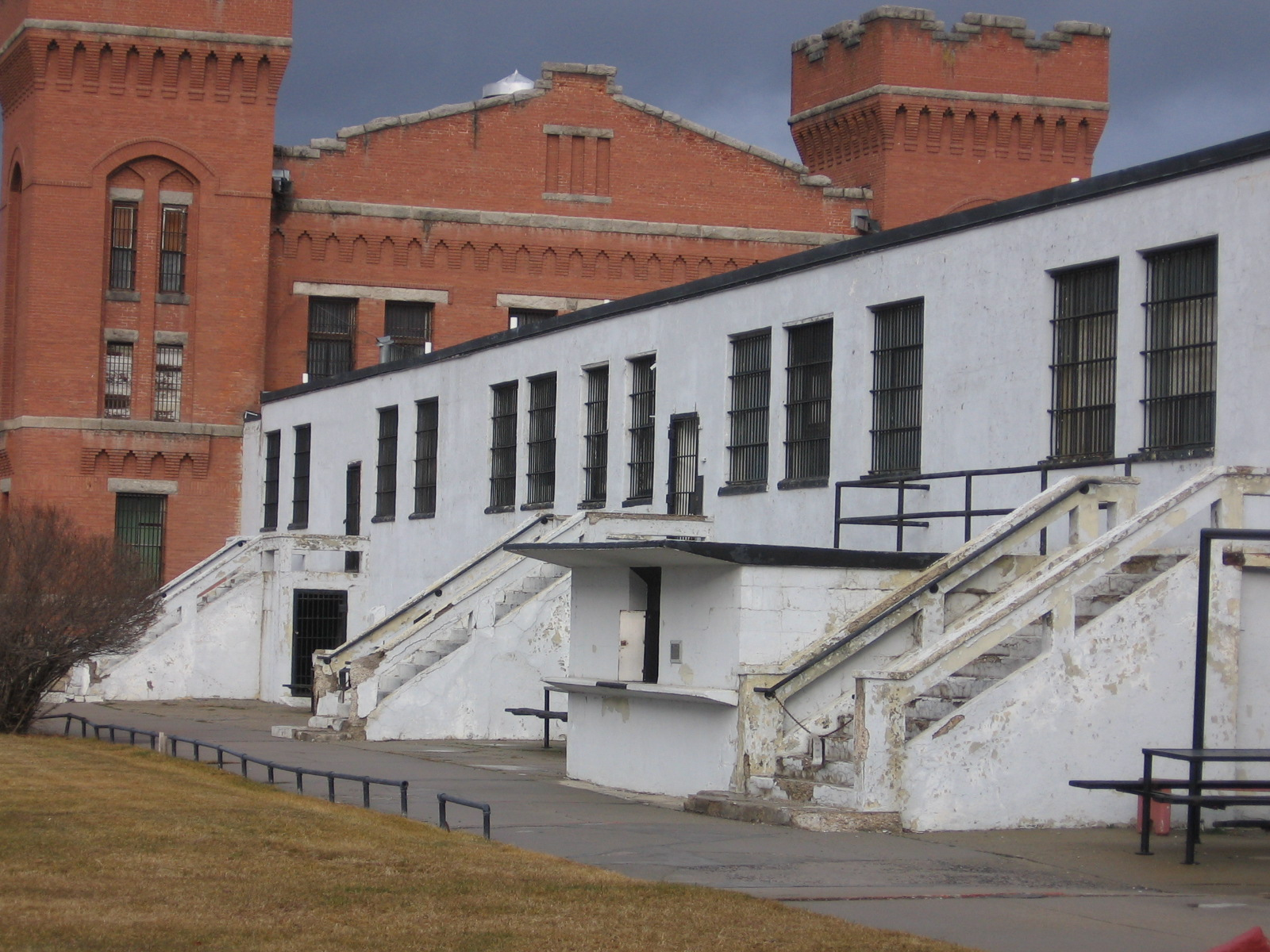
1932 Administration building

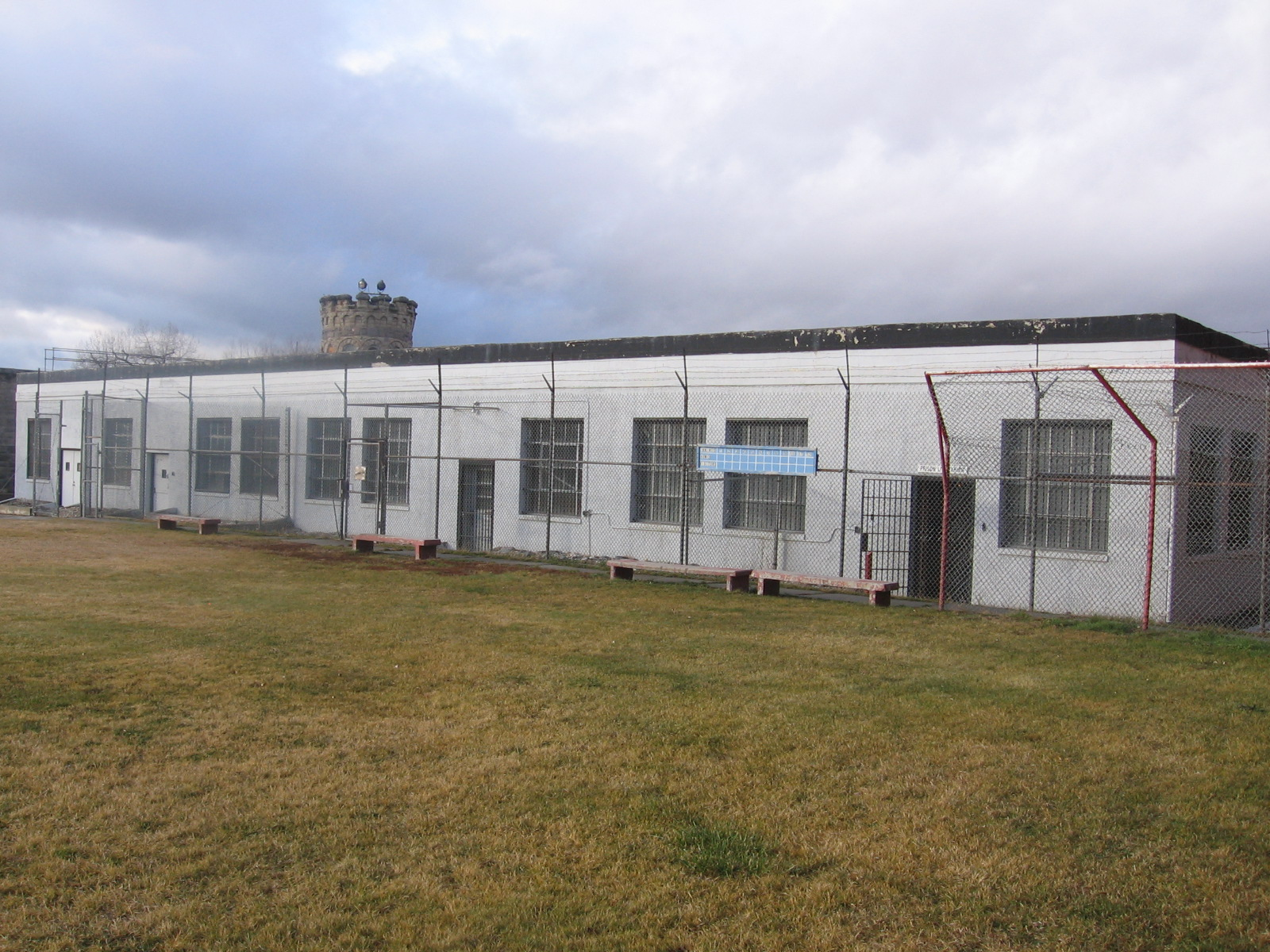
Industrial complex

Only three construction projects happened at the prison between 1921 and 1959. The first, funded in 1927 by a $40,000 grant from the state for use in constructing a license plate and garment factory inside the walls, instead went toward remodeling the old Territorial building, converting the central section into administerial offices, one wing into a license plant and the other wing into the garment factory. In 1932, this building would come down in the second construction opportunity for inmates—the construction of a new administration building. The simple, rectangular concrete building bridged the gap between the older, Gothic-style cellblocks and housed administration offices on the top floor and a dining hall, shoe shop, and laundry in the lower floor. 1935 saw the last new construction in the prison with an industrial shop complex that went up parallel to the north wall, perpendicular to the 1912 Cellblock. This building housed the prison's new hospital, including an infirmary, surgery, dentist's office, psych ward, and doctor's office. Also in this building was the new license plate factory, which moved to the prison ranch in 1960, and eight cells, which were sometimes used as Death Row.

Meanwhile, the institution's existing buildings continued to degrade. The 1896 Cellblock still had no individual plumbing in the cells; a flush toilet had been installed on the ground level, but inmates had no access to it after lights out. The lighting in the cells was insufficient even for reading; the wiring installed at the start of the 20th century could barely power a 25 watt bulb. There was no ventilation, the wooden roof had not been replaced, and the cell doors still unlocked individually. A state investigation in 1931 found this cellblock to be "a disgrace to civilization".

The 1912 Cellblock was in better shape, though it was still substandard. It was stifling in the summer, when inmates on the top tiers would throw items through the windows to create a breeze, and freezing in the winter, when inmates on the bottom tiers would drape the bottom half of their cell doors with blankets to keep out the chill. There was one shower facility for the 400 inmates with three shower heads; one for a rinse, one for a soap, and the third for a final rinse. The prisoners would step under these one at a time in a single-file line.

=== Administration ===
In addition to the outdated facilities, the guard staff was underpaid, undertrained, and insufficient to manage the ever-increasing number of inmates. Guards at the Montana State Prison during this period were some of the lowest paid correctional officers in the United States, ranked 115 out of 120 state and local institutions. Their median salary was $1200 per year, where the national average was $2000. There were no benefits and no pension plan. Few wardens of the time ran background checks on potential guards, and there was no formal training after hire. By the mid-1950s, 80% of the guard staff were retirees over the age of 55, and in 1957, there was a 75% turnover of guards. In order for this staff to keep order in the prison, a re-institution of the Auburn system came into play, keeping inmates quiet, obedient, and segregated.

The succession of wardens added to the low morale of both guards and prisoners. Appointed by the Governor of Montana for their pliability, ease of placement, and political stature, the wardens of the prison rarely had law enforcement experience, and none had penal institution experience. Unfortunately, due to Conley's aggressive control of the facility, most of the administration of the prison rested in the hands of the warden, including the hiring and firing of guards, requests for new building permits from the state, and most of the parole functions of the institution. In fact, a parole board was not instituted until 1955. Many of the wardens, like A.B. Middleton, tried to better the facility, but those who did often failed. Middleton, who held the position from 1925 to 1937, oversaw all the new construction, but he did little to ease the strain of overpopulation and low morale. Possibly the least effective warden to hold the office was Faye O. Burrell, who was warden from 1953 to 1958. Burrell had been a Ravalli County sheriff before his tenure, and was a man who prided himself on his frugality. The state actually increased funding to the prison during his time, but Burrell decreased his implementation of funds, allowing money slated for updating facilities to go back into general state funds. His wardenship of the prison weathered two riots, and he resigned under heavy controversy.

=== Prison life ===
Since Conley's theory of reform was based so heavily on manual labor, he had spent little time and money on things like education and vocational training. In the 1920s, the prison library was the only means of inmate education; the only classes being taught boiled down to English-speaking instruction for immigrant inmates. The library itself, donated mostly by William Clark before 1920, was outdated, contained mainly light fiction, and had been stringently censored by prison officials. As far as vocational training was concerned, Conley had dealt the prison another blow by removing all his personal equipment from the warehouse, garage, and machine shop; since his contract specified that the buildings, grounds, and land belonged to the state, he had populated these important industries with his own materials to further entrench himself within the prison. This left the prisoners with only industries relating to the upkeep of the prison: laundry, garment construction, maintenance, a toy shop (which made toys for children in state institutions) and the prison band. In the '20s, the warden of the prison took on the role of Registrar of Motor Vehicles and obtained permission for inmates to manufacture license plates.

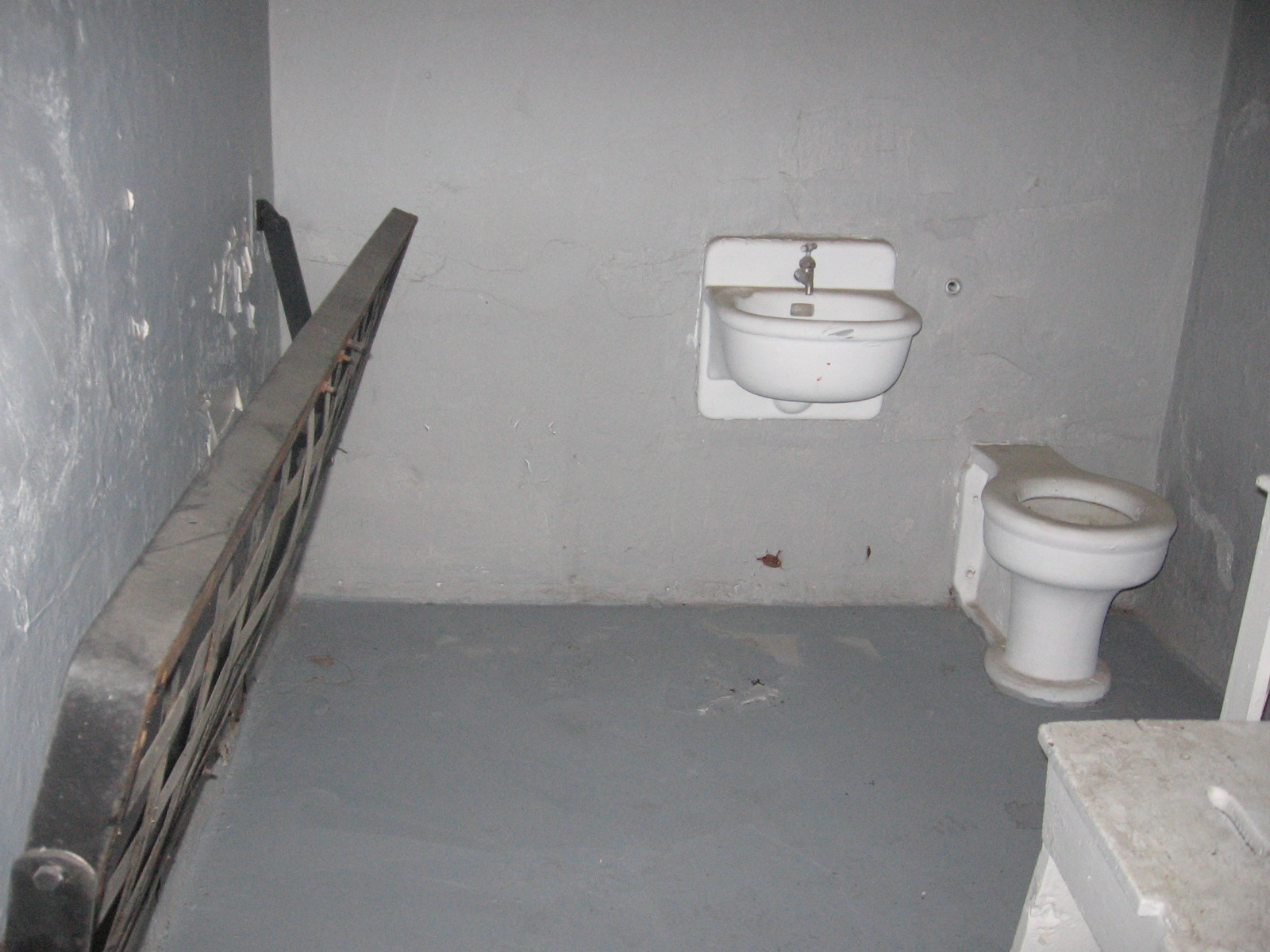
A cell in Cellblock 1

The jobs available to the prisoners were few; between 1930 and 1960, about 200 inmates out of a population averaging 550 had something to do. In the 1940s and '50s, most prisoners spent twenty-two hours a day in their cells. The industries that were available were managed not by civilians or guards, but, due to the shortage of staff at the prison, by a system of inmate overseers. Called "con-bosses," these privileged inmates had complete control over their areas, reserving the right to choose which inmates worked under them, how much work they received, and what they had to do to receive work at all. Since work meant not only something to do other than sit in a cell but also time earned off a sentence, this system led to rampant corruption, favoritism, and ill-feelings among the prisoners, since the con-bosses often sold positions or used them as leverage for any number of illicit favors.

The onset of the Great Depression flooded the prison with new inmates, and Montana state further curtailed the use of inmate labor to provide jobs for civilians. In another blow to the prisoners, in 1934, the state prohibited the sale of convict-made goods to civilians. Prisoners now had almost no legitimate, worthwhile industries to keep themselves busy, and to exacerbate the situation further, most of the prison yard within the walls had been converted into a vegetable garden, eliminating exercise as a pastime.

=== Riots ===
The mismanagement, insufficient guard staff, and intolerable living conditions led to three riots in the late 1950s. The first riot, called the "pea riot," took place on July 30, 1957 when the members of the prison band refused to pick peas in the garden which was the prison yard. The temperature was hot, and the band members were used to being left alone, if not coddled, by the prison staff. One member flatly refused the order, which won him time in the hole. The other members decided to work, but after one member flicked a pea at another, the job quickly turned into a foliage-destroying free-for-all. The destructive attitude in the garden quickly infected the rest of the prison, and inmates rushed from the cellblocks to take part in the destruction. The guards on duty were quickly overrun and locked into cells. A standoff between the prisoners and government officials, including Attorney General Forrest Anderson and about 200 National Guardsmen, lasted about 24 hours. The warden, Faye O. Burrell, was out of town, taking delivery of an inmate from Indiana who had escaped years earlier. The prisoners clamored for better conditions, better food, better mail service, and the firing of Benjamin W. Wright, the man in charge of Montana's relatively new parole system. Anderson offered an eight-point program which sated the prisoners, and they retreated to their cells without bloodshed. Upon Burrell's return, however, he revoked the program drawn up by Anderson, claiming that he had not, and would not, negotiate with convicts.

The second riot, in response to Warden Burrell having ignored Anderson's eight-point program, happened on January 27, 1958. During a tour of the prison by the Montana Council on Corrections, the inmates instigated a twenty-four-hour sit-down strike in which they refused to report to work, ignored orders from guards, and loitered about the cell house corridors. Warden Burrell ordered the lights and heat be turned off, which, in January, meant many hours of frigid darkness. The cold, hungry inmates returned to their cells and, for punishment, for a week were refused mail and access to the canteen where they could purchase cigarettes, candy, and other sundries.

== 1959 Riot ==
1959 was a turbulent year in Montana State Prison history. Following Warden Burrell's resignation in February 1958, the Montana Council on Corrections decided that, in order to modernize the facility, the next warden of the prison would be selected from a nationwide search, putting an end to the tradition of gubernatorial appointees. Floyd Powell, of Wisconsin, was chosen from the candidates who applied, and he took control of the prison in August 1958. He managed to instill some reforms before, in 1959, a riot kept the prison and the town of Deer Lodge on edge for thirty-six hours. The riot started on 16 April 1959 and was the longest and bloodiest riot at the facility. Instigated by a pair of inmates, Jerry Myles and Lee Smart, the riot would claim the lives of three people, wound several others, and maintain the facility under inmate control for thirty-six hours. It ended in the early hours of 18 April 1959 when a brace of National Guard troops stormed the facility. Then, in August of the same year, an earthquake structurally damaged Cellblock 2, leading to its destruction.

=== Warden Floyd Powell ===
Born in La Valle, Wisconsin, just before World War I, Floyd Powell came to Montana in response to the nationwide search for a warden who would update the Montana State Prison into a modern facility. With more than eighteen years of penal experience at the Wisconsin State Prison in Waupun, Powell arrived in Deer Lodge knowing the only way to truly modernize the prison rested in building a whole new facility; what existed in downtown Deer Lodge was far too antiquated to be worth revitalizing. Within weeks of taking charge of the prison, Powell summoned his friend and subordinate, Ted Rothe, from Wisconsin to be his deputy warden.

Between the two of them, Powell and Rothe began a series of reforms which were targeted at updating the facility. They began to abolish the "con-boss" system, improved inmate food quality by instilling a "Take all you want, but eat all you take" policy and by supplying condiments on the tables. They also sought to crack down on the rampant drug use and black market inside the walls and began performing exhaustive background checks on the prisoners, a practice that was not standard operating procedure until Powell's tenure. A training regimen for the guards was also instilled, which bettered communication between shifts and cut back on guard contributions to the black market. Something they were unable to initiate until too late was the removal of firearms from the cellblocks; Powell and Rothe wanted to completely sweep both cellblocks of the rifles the guards carried on the catwalks. They saw the .30-30 Winchester rifles' presence as an instigator for inmate uprising, but the guards refused to surrender the guns.

Though the pair from Wisconsin were doing their best to better the conditions in the prison, they felt heavy resistance from both inmates and guards who had flourished under the previously lax security, as well as from the population of Montana who viewed any improvement in the quality of life of an inmate nothing more than coddling convicts. In his own words in a report to the Board of Prison commissioners, Powell stated:

To bring about the tremendous change needed to make the Montana correctional system a workable, valuable, efficient, adequate activity is an almost insurmountable job, particularly trying to do it in a grossly inadequate physical plant and with a lack of trained personnel.

Although Powell and Rothe meant well with their reforms, their alteration of the power structures within the facility led to a bloody riot which started on 16 April 1959.

=== Leaders of the riot ===
==== Jerry Myles ====
The primary leader of the riot, Jerry Myles was born in Sioux City, Iowa, on 15 January 1915 under the name Donald Groat. His mother was an unmarried transient who quickly put her son up for adoption. By the time he was sixteen, he was in reform school, and for the rest of his life he would spend more time inside correctional facilities than outside them. Described as having an "emotionally unstable, psychopathic personality" by psychiatrist Romney Ritchey at Alcatraz, Jerry Myles nonetheless had a genius intellect, scoring 125 and 147 on intelligence tests in Atlanta and Montana, respectively. Using suicide attempts, petty disturbances, and sexual deviancy, he strove to become the center of attention. He was an institutionalized career prisoner, often committing small acts of burglary to get sentenced to more prison time whenever he found himself free, and, once incarcerated, struggled to be noticed.

On December 4, 1944, he organized a mutiny at the federal penitentiary in Atlanta, Georgia on the grounds of poor medical care, no church services, and having to wait in line in the mess hall with "the German intake and the Negro intake". After the mutiny, the administration at USP Atlanta declared Jerry Myles to be incorrigible and a danger to the security of their prison. They determined that their facilities were insufficient to fully monitor Myles' activities, so on 8 May 1945 they transferred him to the federal penitentiary at Alcatraz.

Jerry Myles would spend about seven years at Alcatraz between 1945 and 1952, after which he was transferred to Leavenworth. While Jerry was at The Rock, the legendary "Battle of Alcatraz" occurred on May 2, 1946, and Myles, while he did not take part in the escape attempt, learned much from the methods of Bernard Coy, who initiated the riot. The disturbance Myles would later start in Montana shared many elements with the Battle of Alcatraz. Myles was released from Leavenworth on March 3, 1952, after which he finished his sentence at the Georgia State Penitentiary and was released in May 1958. During his long prison tenure, Myles had learned of a prison in Montana where the convicts ran the industries, and Myles was interested in what he viewed was a place where he could have power.

After his release, Myles bought a bus ticket to Butte, about 40 miles (64 km) from Deer Lodge, where he was arrested for burglary. He was sentenced to five years at the Montana State Prison and arrived in Deer Lodge in June 1958. Since the prison at that time was not in the habit of running background checks on incoming prisoners, his previous penal experience went unnoticed, and he was assigned to a cell in the general population. Myles quickly rose to the position of con-boss of the garment shop, due to his experience in similar places in other penitentiaries around the country and the notoriety of his experience in USP Atlanta, Leavenworth, and, of course, Alcatraz. He used the position to his advantage, decorating his apartment-like cell in the garment shop with niceties and manipulating young inmates into providing him with sexual favors for work in the factory. When Warden Powell abolished the con-boss system in October 1958, Myles was stripped of his favor in the prison community and started acting out, which earned him time in segregation. He had a short, heated interview with Deputy Warden Rothe in which Myles took an intense dislike to Rothe and threatened his life. Rothe sentenced Myles to isolation, or the hole, for an indefinite amount of time followed by a longer stint in segregation.

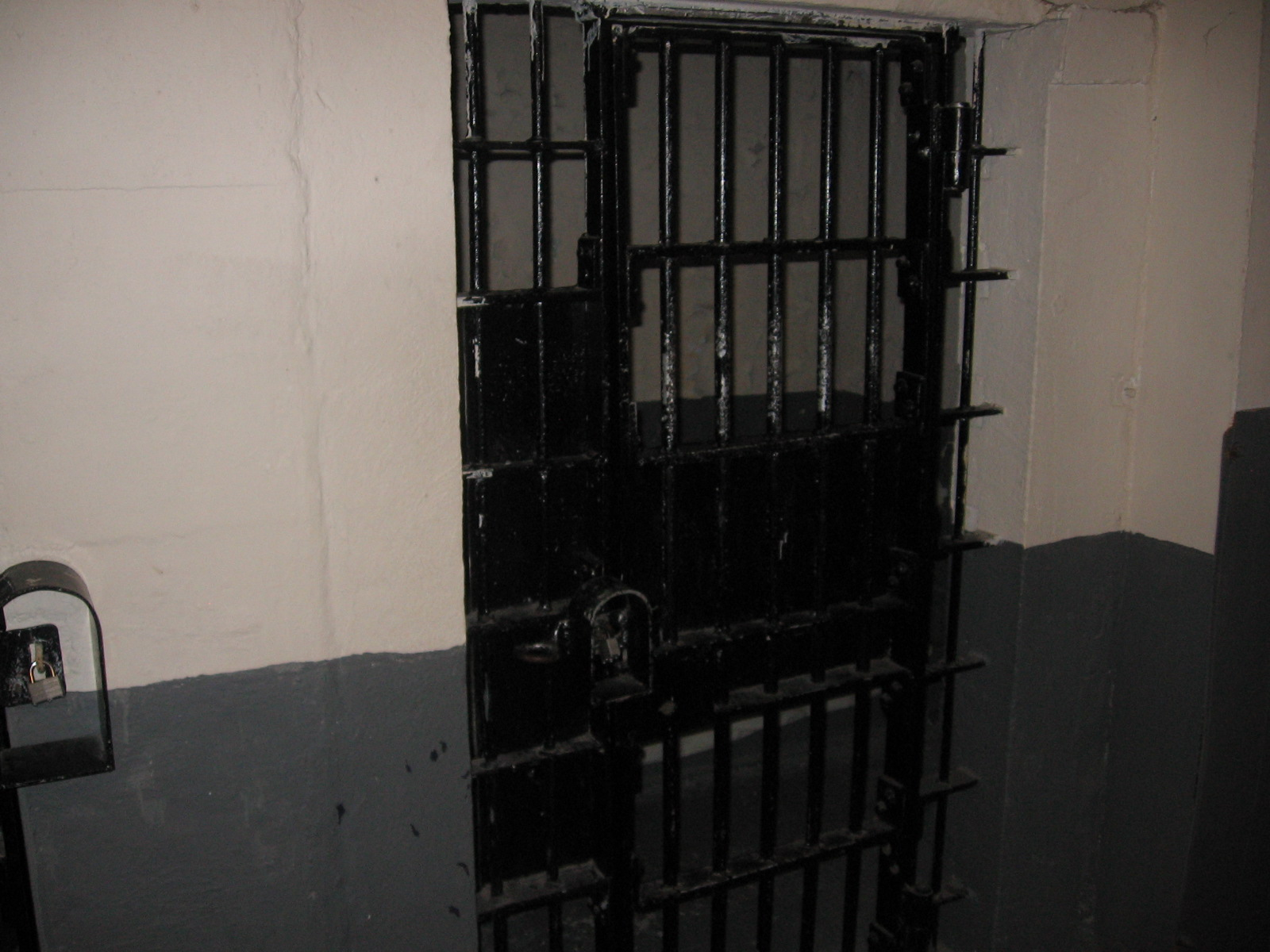
A cell in Siberia

Walter Jones, the prison's newly graduated sociologist, recognized the danger Myles represented and suggested further segregation in Siberia in the base of the northern towers of Cellblock 1. The area known as Siberia was separated from the rest of the prison yard by a razor-wire topped chain-link fence and was used to keep known troublemakers apart from the rest of the population. The cells were cramped, cold, and isolated. Rothe rejected this treatment of Myles, claiming that he wanted to gain inmate trust by showing equal rights to all prisoners regardless of their past activities. On February 27, 1959, Rothe released Myles back into the general population and assigned him to the water crew—the group of inmates who emptied toilet buckets from Cellblock 2 and the guard towers. In April of that same year, Myles would incite the riot.

==== Lee Smart and George Alton ====
Lee Smart was born in 1940 in Washington State and lived 17 years before being sentenced to thirty years confinement to the Montana State Prison for the second-degree murder of traveling salesman Charles Ward outside of Browning, Montana on April 28, 1956. Smart had bludgeoned Ward to death with a pair of lineman's pliers and robbed him of $100 cash. Smart was almost 6 ft (1.8 m) tall and weighed 147 pounds, wore a ducktail haircut, a black leather jacket, and had tattooed arms and chest. He and a friend had escaped from a reformatory camp in Cedar Creek, Washington, on April 14, 1956. The two then went on a two-week criminal binge which ended in Great Falls, Montana. Lee Smart left his friend in Great Falls and went north, where he ended up killing Ward.

Once inside the walls of the Montana State Prison, Smart eventually found his place playing drums for the prison band. Though one of the youngest convicts in Montana, he had fallen in with a relatively powerful group of convicts—the "band gang" was the largest trafficker of narcotics in the prison. Lee became a regular member of the cadre, and his crime of murder gave him standing among the inmates, most of whom were incarcerated for larceny. One of the inmates who was highly impressed by Smart's haughty, impulsive nature was Jerry Myles, who befriended the boy. Smart got in trouble a few times, once for being in possession of a weapon, once over his haircut (which led him to receive a buzz cut by an inmate barber), and again over having an illicit weapon (which earned him time in isolation).

Since the prison had no system of segregating inmates based on age, crime, or sexual proclivities, Smart was housed in general population where his youthful frame became an instant target for older, predatory cons. His crime of murder and connection with the band gang lent him a modicum of notoriety, but he still felt obliged to hire George Alton, a known troublemaker, for protection at the cost of ten dollars a month. Alton, who had been in and out of prison since 1952, regularly sold protection services to newer inmates who could not fight for themselves. A diminutive, wiry Montanan, Alton was well respected by guards and inmates alike, known for his vicious left hook and his prowess in the prizefighting ring, held weekly in the WA Clark Theatre. Alton and Smart became friends and eventual cellmates, until Alton was moved outside the walls into minimum security housing.

Taking full advantage of his "trusty" status, Alton escaped with a fellow inmate in a prison vehicle marked "Registrar of Motor Vehicles" on August 26, 1958, the day after Floyd Powell started his job as warden. The two prisoners waved to the new warden on their way past the prison, and Powell waved back. By the time the warden realized what had happened, Alton and his confederate were too far away to do anything. Alton managed to stay hidden until November 1958, when he was apprehended in his hometown of Culbertson. He was remanded to the prison and spent time in the hole, then more time in segregation. It was during this time that he met, and had extensive conversations with, Jerry Myles, who had been placed in the cell right next to Alton's in segregation.

=== Preparations ===
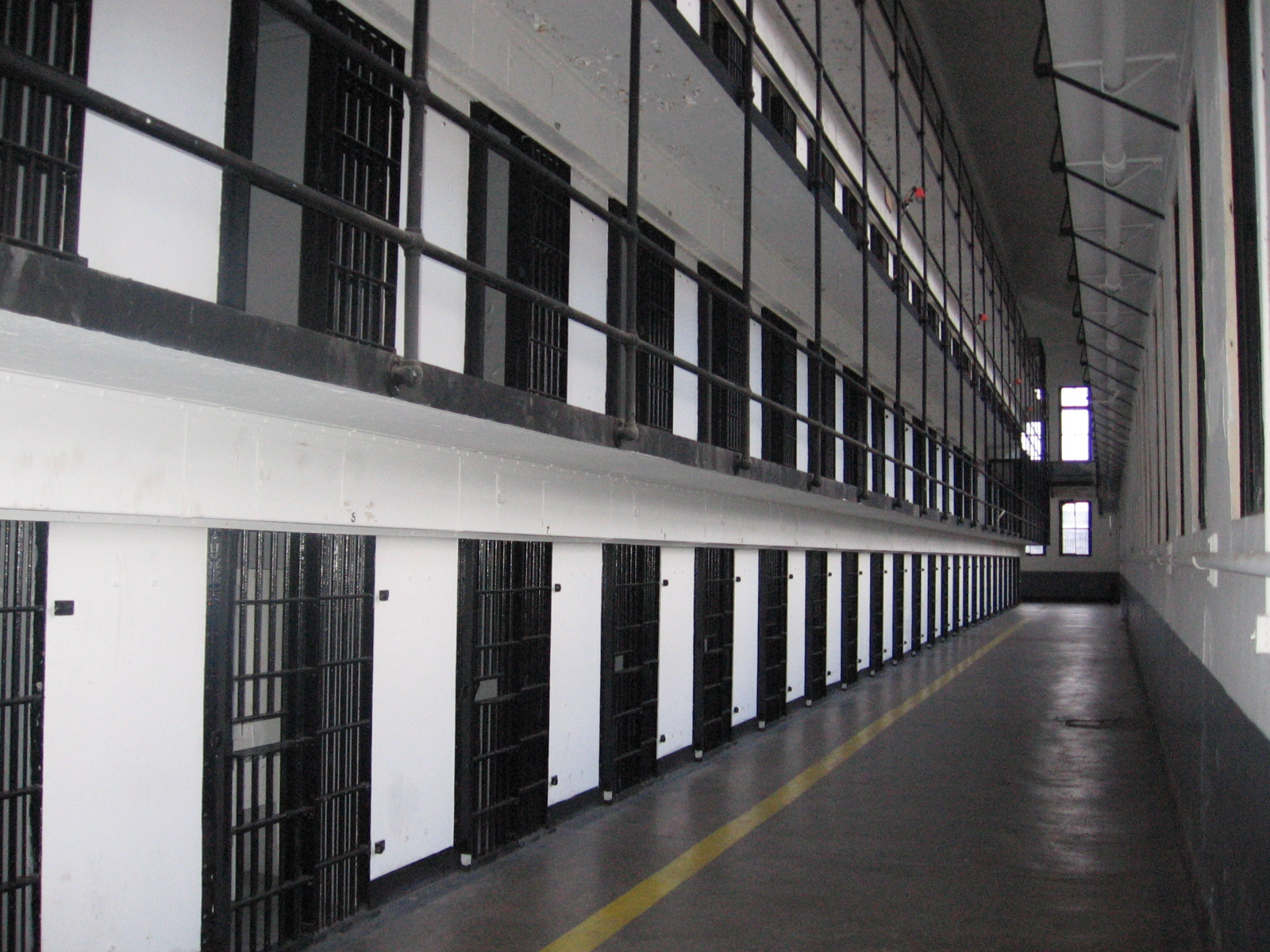
Interior of Cellblock 1, showing proximity of cell tier and catwalk

Jerry Myles knew that timing would play a major factor in the successful initiation of the riot. Between the time he was released back into general population in February 1958 until he decided to start the riot, he paid close attention to the movements of the guards and found a loophole in their routine; each day during the dinnertime turnover, the ratio of guards to inmates was decreased in Cellblock 1. His plan was to seize a rifle from one of the guards who walked the catwalk outside his cell when the guard was alone. The catwalk was close to the tier of cells. Guards routinely moved between the catwalk and the tiers by little more than hopping from one to the other; since neither walkway was caged, the maneuver was simple.

Myles also needed to recruit other inmates to his cause but limit the number of prisoners who knew specifics to ensure the administration would be caught unaware. He chose to let Lee Smart in on the plans, coaxing the boy along with promises of freedom and adventure. George Alton, a shrewd, intelligent man, was less easily convinced, though a workable escape plan attracted him. Myles needed Alton because of his rapport with the inmate population. Alton also worked in the prison garage and had access to gasoline, a crucial part of Myles' plans. Myles assured Alton that they would use Deputy Warden Rothe as a shield and hostage to gain exit from Tower 7, and from there to freedom. Myles also strong-armed Harold Laureys, a known lockpicker, or "gopher man" in prison lingo, into being ready for an escape attempt, but gave him few specifics other than that.

Myles, Smart, and Alton constructed a reservoir in one of the shelves in Smart's cell, and Alton regularly filled that space with gasoline he smuggled out of the garage. The trio waited until they had filled the container before enacting their plans.

=== Start of the riot ===
At about 3:30 p.m. on April 16, 1959, guard Gus Byars was alone on the catwalk of Cellblock 1 across from where Myles and Smart were loitering. Byars turned to open a window to the brisk spring wind when he heard someone call his name. He turned into a splash of gasoline which hit him in the face and chest, soaking his shirt.

Lee Smart had tossed the gasoline as Jerry Myles lit a match to a torch he had constructed from a mop. He thrust the mop at the guard, who froze in fear. Smart and Alton lit a broom and tossed it onto the catwalk behind Byars, who, with his vision blurred by the gasoline, saw he was surrounded by fire. He quickly surrendered his keys and rifle and allowed himself to be led to the hole.

While Myles, Smart, and Alton were securing the rifle and keys, other inmates ambushed the only other two guards in Cellblock 1, threatening them with knives. The guards surrendered their keys and were also led to the hole.

At this point, the inmates were in full possession of three guards, a rifle, and keys to the facility, though they still had no ammunition for the weapon. They quickly moved over to Cellblock 2, where they knew the ammunition was stored, and were in possession of that building within minutes, even after a tense standoff between a guard holding a loaded rifle and an inmate with a knife. The guard hesitated and received a slashed hand in return. Had he fired on the inmate, the riot may not have progressed. As it was, the inmates were now in control of two rifles, seventeen rounds of ammunition, and both cellblocks. Over the course of the next ten to fifteen minutes, several more guards would walk into Cellblock 1, be immediately and quietly overwhelmed, and led into the hole.

=== Death of Deputy Warden Rothe ===
By 4:00, Myles, Smart, and Alton had control over the whole facility except for the minimum security housing outside the southern wall and the upper floor of the administration building, called "Inside Administration". This portion of the facility housed offices for the warden, the deputy warden, the sociologist, and other prison infrastructure. The only woman working within the prison walls, Babe Lightfoot, held an office in Inside Administration, but by the time the rioters reached this area of the prison, she had already evacuated upon orders from an inmate.

Ted Rothe had been across the street attending a meeting with Warden Powell and some architects who were designing the new facility Powell wanted to build. Rothe returned to his desk inside the prison at a few minutes before 4:00, oblivious to the inmate takeover. To this point, there had been almost no noise, few scuffles, and no casualties. He chatted with a guard for a few minutes before sitting behind his desk, which was in view of the door where inmates came to receive their medication. Myles, Smart, and a third inmate named Toms came up to the door, where Myles asked to receive some pills for his headaches. The guard on duty, Officer Cox, turned to retrieve them as another guard opened the door to let a third guard out. As soon as the door opened, Myles rushed through, brandishing a meat cleaver he had acquired from the kitchens. Toms threatened the other guards with a knife, and they allowed themselves to be herded into a nearby lavatory. Myles burst into Deputy Warden Rothe's office and attacked Rothe with the cleaver. Rothe deflected the blow with a plywood letterbox.

The struggle continued for a few seconds. Cox grabbed a chair and raised it to hit Myles, but Lee Smart unveiled the rifle he had had wrapped in a cone of leather and fired once, hitting Rothe in the chest, killing him instantly. Myles turned on Cox and slashed with his cleaver, slicing Cox along his arm. The inmates quickly herded the guards into the lavatory, along with a civilian mail-sorter, and locked them in. Another guard, Officer Simonsen, was coming up the steps to Inside Administration, and Myles and Smart took him hostage and had him call the warden.

=== Warden Powell as hostage ===
At a little after 4:00, Officer Simonsen phoned Warden Powell, who was across the street at his residence. Simonsen told the warden there was a disturbance inside the prison and that someone had been knifed. Under duress from Myles and Smart, the officer told the warden little else, and Powell rushed through Tower 7 along with two guards to see what the "disturbance" was. As soon as he entered Inside Administration, he was yanked through the doorway. His escort realized something was wrong and retreated, escaping back through Tower 7. The guards on top of this tower knew something was wrong and had tried to warn the warden, but the blustery spring wind had obliterated their words.

Inside, Warden Powell came face-to-face with Myles and Smart, who immediately forced Powell to call Governor Aronson in Helena. Aronson, however, was out of town and would not return until about 6:30 that evening. Powell left a message with the governor's secretary to have Aronson call Powell at Number 8 as soon as he returned. "Number 8" was a pre-arranged warning that told the governor that Warden Powell had been compromised and that Aronson should not return the call.

After the call, Powell managed to convince Myles that Cox and Rothe needed medical attention and should be allowed to leave the facility. Myles agreed, and an ambulance collected the bleeding guard and the deceased deputy warden. Powell also attempted to talk the ringleaders into discontinuing the riot to no avail.

While Myles and Smart coerced guards and wardens to make telephone calls, Alton, armed with the second rifle, set about securing the remaining guards and administrators of the facility. By 4:30, he had locked 20 men into the hole, including sociologist Walter Jones. At a few minutes before 5:00, Myles and Smart led Warden Powell and the other four hostages down to the mess hall, and from there led the hostages into cells in Cellblock 1. Warden Powell sat under guard on one of the mess halls, where he was offered coffee and cake by an inmate. He accepted, and he ate while the rest of the hostages were led from the hole and placed in cells in "Cook's Row" where the kitchen workers were housed.

At about 6:20, the inmates led Powell back to Inside Administration to wait for Governor Aronson's call, which never came. Myles and Smart became anxious and left, leaving Powell in the care of Walter Trotchie, who had orders to kill the warden with a kitchen knife at 8:00 if the governor didn't call. 8:00 came and went, and, instead of killing Powell, Trotchie surrendered his weapon and freed the warden, who offered amnesty to any prisoner who wanted to retreat to minimum security. Six inmates agreed to go, including Trotchie, and Warden Powell escaped the prison, secured the inmates who had come with him, and began managing the handling of the riot from outside .

=== Negotiations and a new escape plan ===
Myles was angry when he discovered that Powell had escaped, but his rage was abated when he realized they had Walter Jones as a hostage. Myles viewed Jones as one of the reasons he had been ousted as a con-boss. Jones managed to talk Myles out of murdering him by offering himself as a negotiator for the demands of the inmates.

Meanwhile, Alton approached Myles with the argument that since Deputy Warden Rothe had been shot and killed, their escape plan was now null. Myles acknowledged that the original plan had failed, so he forwarded the idea of tunneling under the walls. He chose a place in the northwestern tower of Cellblock 1 and put a team of inmates, eventually including the kitchen staff, to work with picks and shovels. The progress on this tunnel would continue for the remainder of the riot, but was doomed to fail. Warden Conley had built the cellblocks and the walls specifically to keep inmates from tunneling, and his designs proved effective.

Outside the walls, Warden Powell was busy trying to deal with budding public reaction to the riot. The word had leaked quickly, and wives of guards who were hostages started showing up at his house. Powell decided to again enter the prison through the tunnel system which gave access to the gun ports in the mess hall and the catwalks in the cellblocks. Luckily, the riot leaders had been unable to secure a key to the access points to this tunnel system, or else Powell may have been taken hostage again. Just after sundown, Powell made his way through the tunnels to the mess hall and shouted for Myles and Smart. Myles showed up, leading Jones with a knife at his throat. Powell asked what Myles wanted, and received a verbal tirade from Myles, who stalked away, leaving Jones with Alton. Powell was told that Myles wanted at least thirty members of the press to come inside the prison, take pictures of the conditions and speak with the inmates. Powell offered to get three reporters inside the walls under the understanding that they would not print a word of what they learned until the hostages were released. Alton agreed to the plan. Powell returned to his residence to await the coming day.

Meanwhile, National Guard forces were consolidating at Trask Hall, the gymnasium of Montana's first college campus, just four blocks from the prison. Members of the press were converging upon the warden's residence, and the city and county switchboards were becoming overrun with calls regarding the riot, some as far away as London, England. By the next day, reporters from magazines like Life and TIME descended upon the town, and Deer Lodge's prison riot made international news.

After midnight, Myles summoned Jones to talk to the media. Through Jones, Myles warned that any offensive action against the prison would end in the killing of the hostages by fire, hanging, or stabbing. Myles then spoke up, telling the amassed media that he was fighting for better conditions and just wanted to be heard. He again threatened the hostages with death if any action was taken against the prison and paraded Jones in front of the windows with a knife at his throat to make his point. Afterward, Myles led Jones back to a cell.

At midmorning on Friday, Myles and Smart allowed Jones to exit the prison walls to escort the three reporters, one from the Associated Press, another from United Press International, and the third from radio station KREM of Spokane, Washington. Myles allowed Jones eight minutes to return with the media before he threatened to begin killing hostages. Jones met with the warden and the reporters outside Tower 7 and managed to get the reporters into the mess hall inside his eight-minute window.

Only seven inmates met with the reporters, one of which was George Alton, but neither Jerry Myles or Lee Smart took part in the interview. Jones remained to assist the prisoners with their statements. The reporters recorded a plethora of complaints ranging from the sanitation in Cellblock 2 to the use of the hole as a disciplinary tool, but the most common grievance was the parole system. The inmates demanded the resignation of Benjamin Wright, the same man the convicts had asked to have fired during the pea riot of 1957.

The reporters were allowed to leave the prison without incident, and Warden Powell announced that he expected to have the hostages released as per the agreement he had made with Alton. Myles, however, demanded more reporters come inside the facility to take pictures, and he stated that nobody would be allowed to leave until he saw the story in print. = Powell, on the other hand, would not re-negotiate a deal. Since Myles refused to release guards, Powell refused to allow the story to run.

This started a twenty-four-plus hour standoff in which Myles railed openly to the media outside the walls; Alton retired to his cell after an argument with Myles, convinced that no escape was forthcoming; Jones was again allowed to leave the prison to negotiate with Powell and, under orders from the warden, did not return; and the hostages survived repeated threats of death by fire, rope, or knife. The hostages were eventually crowded into three cells, and the frightened men planned to press the thin prison mattresses against the bars to ward off any attack, but they knew the shield would not hold long against fire or at all against the rifles. Governor Aronson, still in Helena, continued to refuse to negotiate with the prisoners, saying:

(I am)…standing firm on my original statement that I have no intention to go to Deer Lodge or to talk to any of the rebellious convicts until order has been restored, all hostages released unharmed and convicts back in their cells.

=== End of the riot ===
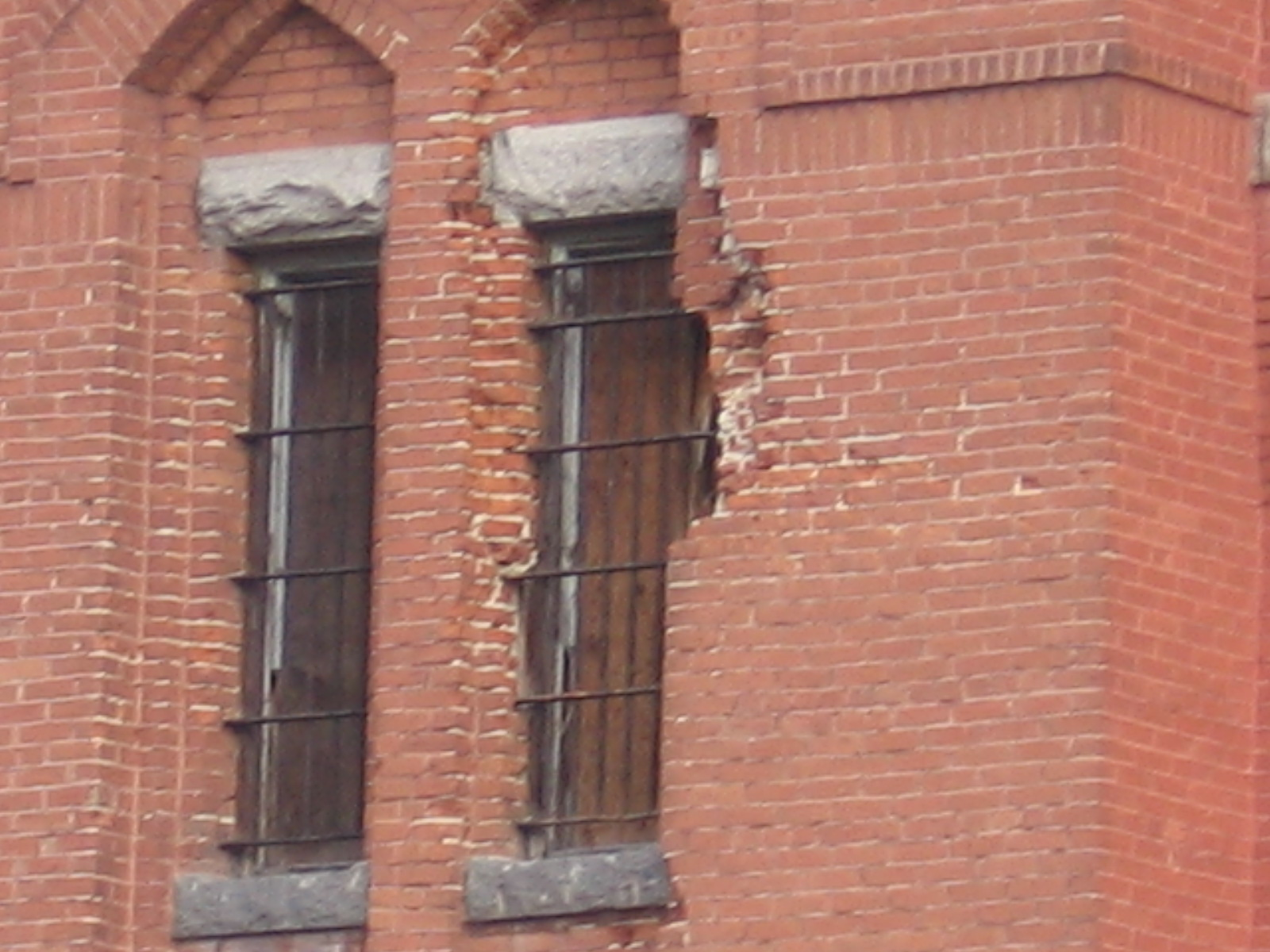
Bazooka damage to Cellblock 1

Thirty-six hours after Myles, Smart, and Alton pitched gasoline at a guard to start the riot, the Montana National Guard ended the riot. At about 4:45 a.m. on 18 April 1959, Bill Rose of the National Guard fired a World War II bazooka at the southwest tower of Cellblock 1 while Highway Patrolman Bob Zaharko fired a Thompson submachine gun through a window which had been identified as where Myles and Smart were hiding on the northeast tower of Cellblock 1. The media had been placed under watch to ensure they did not leak news of the attack to the inmates, who were listening to the radio inside the prison.

While Rose and Zaharko rained ordnance on Cellblock 1, a contingent of seven teams of National Guard waited outside the door to the women's prison on the western wall of the prison. As soon as the first bazooka round hit Cellblock 1, they burst through the door and split up, some rushing the main entrance to Cellblock 1, others going to Cellblock 2, and more circling around to storm Inside Administration.

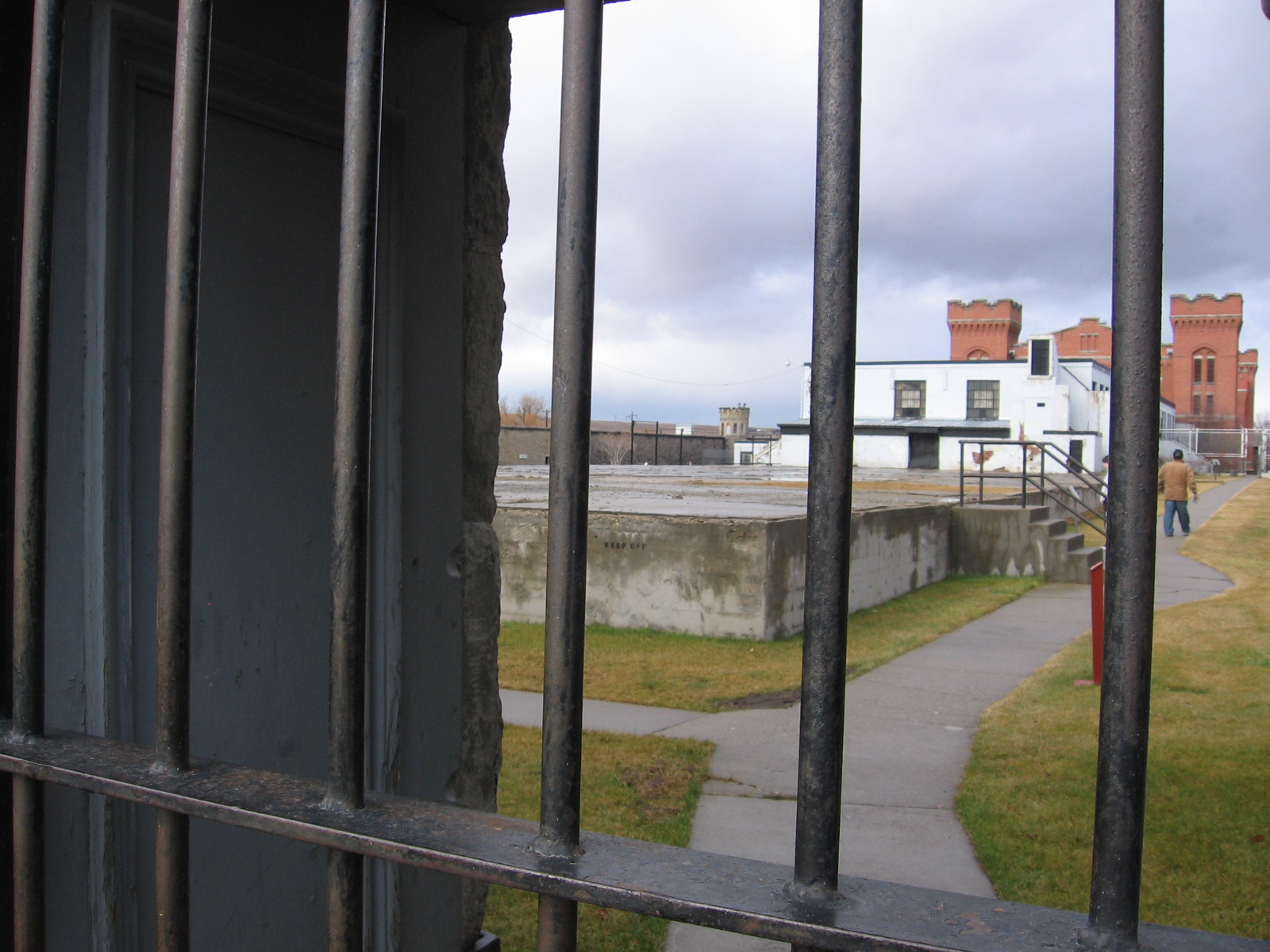
View into prison from northeast door

The team that invaded Cellblock 1 had to burst through two barricaded doors before gaining access to the tiers of cells. Most of the inmates were already in their cells and did not give the Guardsmen any problems. The soldiers filed up to where the hostages were kept and freed them, escorting them through the door into the minimum security facility in the northeast corner of the wall. All the hostages emerged unharmed.

Back in Cellblock 1, a team of Guardsmen entered the tower where Myles and Smart were hiding. The soldiers had to push past a pile of rubble which had been removed from the unsuccessful tunneling attempt as they made their way up the stairs. During their ascent, Jerry Myles managed to shoot Lieutenant Francis "Russ" Pulliam in the arm, who was removed and remanded to the hospital at Fort Harrison in Helena. Just after Pulliam was shot, a third bazooka round exploded against the tower, followed by tear gas canisters fired from the walls. Moments after the gas began to take effect, Myles and Smart fully ended the riot with a murder-suicide.

=== Aftermath ===
In an interview for TIME Magazine which ran just after the riot, Warden Floyd Powell said, "Things are going to get a lot tougher around here." As soon as official control returned to the prison, the prison guards and National Guard soldiers locked all 438 inmates inside their cells and began a systematic search of the facility. Tier by tier, the guards removed the prisoners from their cells, had them strip down and stand naked in the prison yard while National Guardsmen removed all personal effects from the cells. The prisoners were subjected to cavity searches, and many, including George Alton, had the dead bodies of Myles and Smart paraded in front of them before the cadavers were surrendered to the coroner. In their search of the cellhouses, the guards found 382 knives and had to haul away other contraband to the city dump in several 2 1/2-ton truck loads.

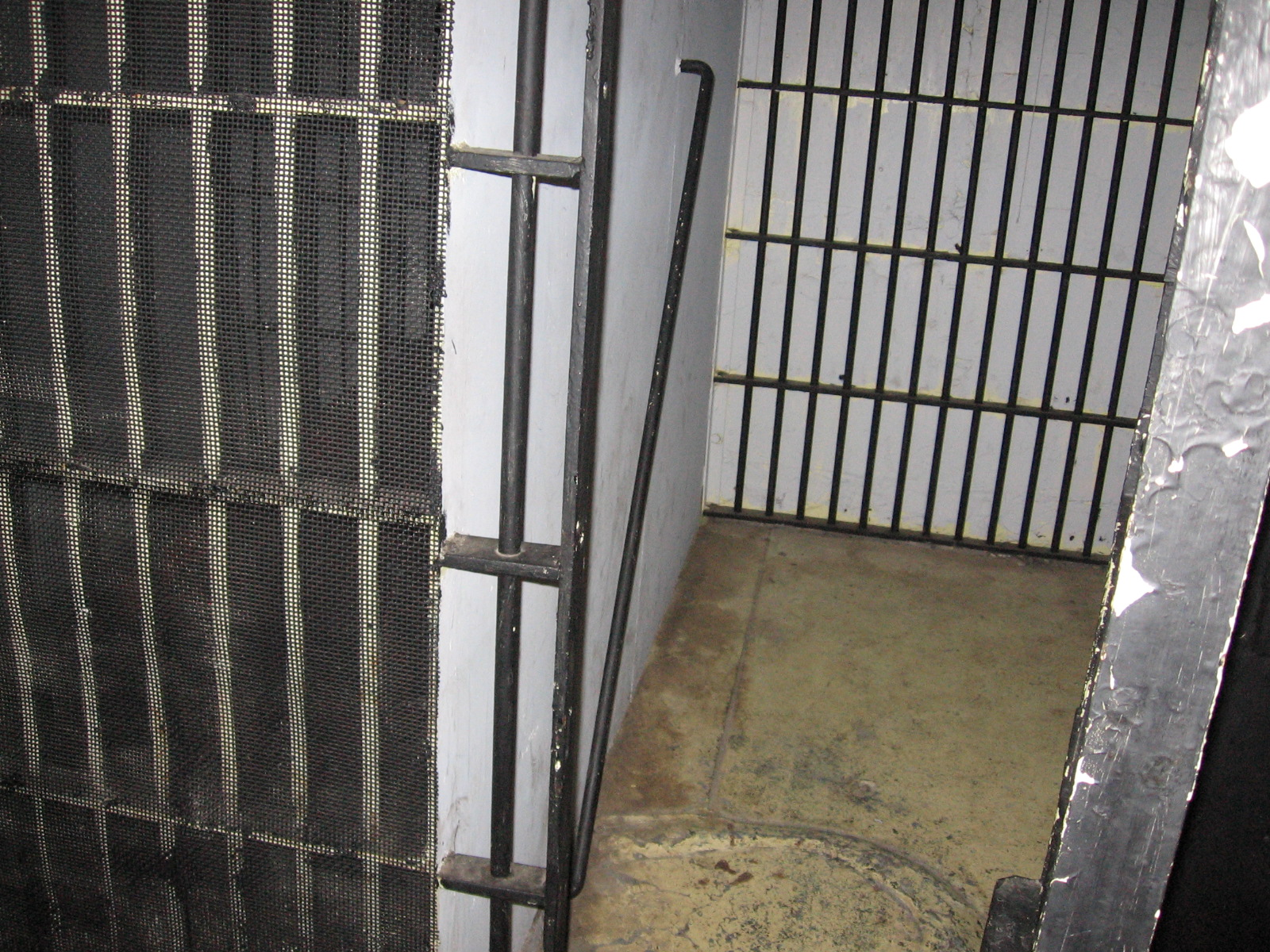
Anti-suicide cell with angled bar

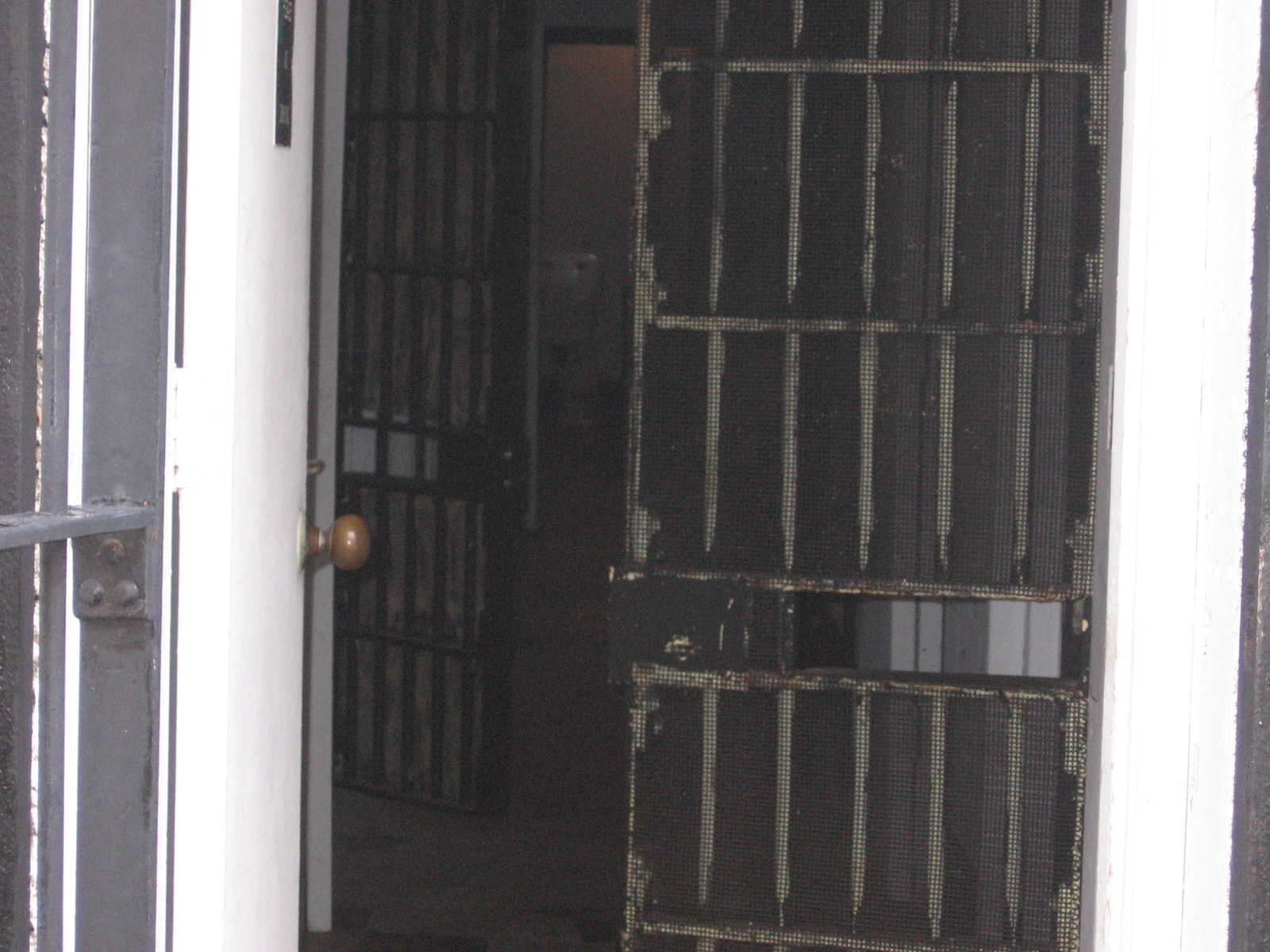
Cell door in maximum security with screen

Warden Powell decided that severe segregation for the remaining instigators of the riot was in order, so he moved the women prisoners out of their building and into housing across the street. They would eventually end up in the Montana Women's Prison in Billings, Montana. He converted the small building into a maximum security facility which had twenty-four high security and disciplinary cells. George Alton spent two years in one of these cells, which, at the time, did not have plumbing. Inmates were provided a "honey bucket", and it was common practice for recalcitrant inmates to slosh the contents of this waste bucket at passing guards, which led to the installation of screens or wooden doors outside the bars. Two cells were installed with an angled bar along one wall to which an inmate could be hand- and ankle-cuffed to prevent him from suicide attempts, and two more were converted into "black box" cells, much like the hole had been.

In the years that followed the riot, Floyd Powell strove to provide the state of Montana with a new facility. The riot had raised awareness of the need for reform, but a five million dollar bond issue put to the citizens of the state failed by a resounding 70%. A large earthquake damaged Cellblock 2 on August 17, 1959, and the antiquated building was condemned. Its destruction kept inmates busy for a few weeks, but led to severe overcrowding in Cellblock 1. In 1961, Governor Nutter curtailed the construction of new state buildings and the state government cut funding to the prison in the amount of $500,000. Warden Floyd Powell resigned in February 1962, a "distraught and frustrated man".

== Last years of the former facility ==
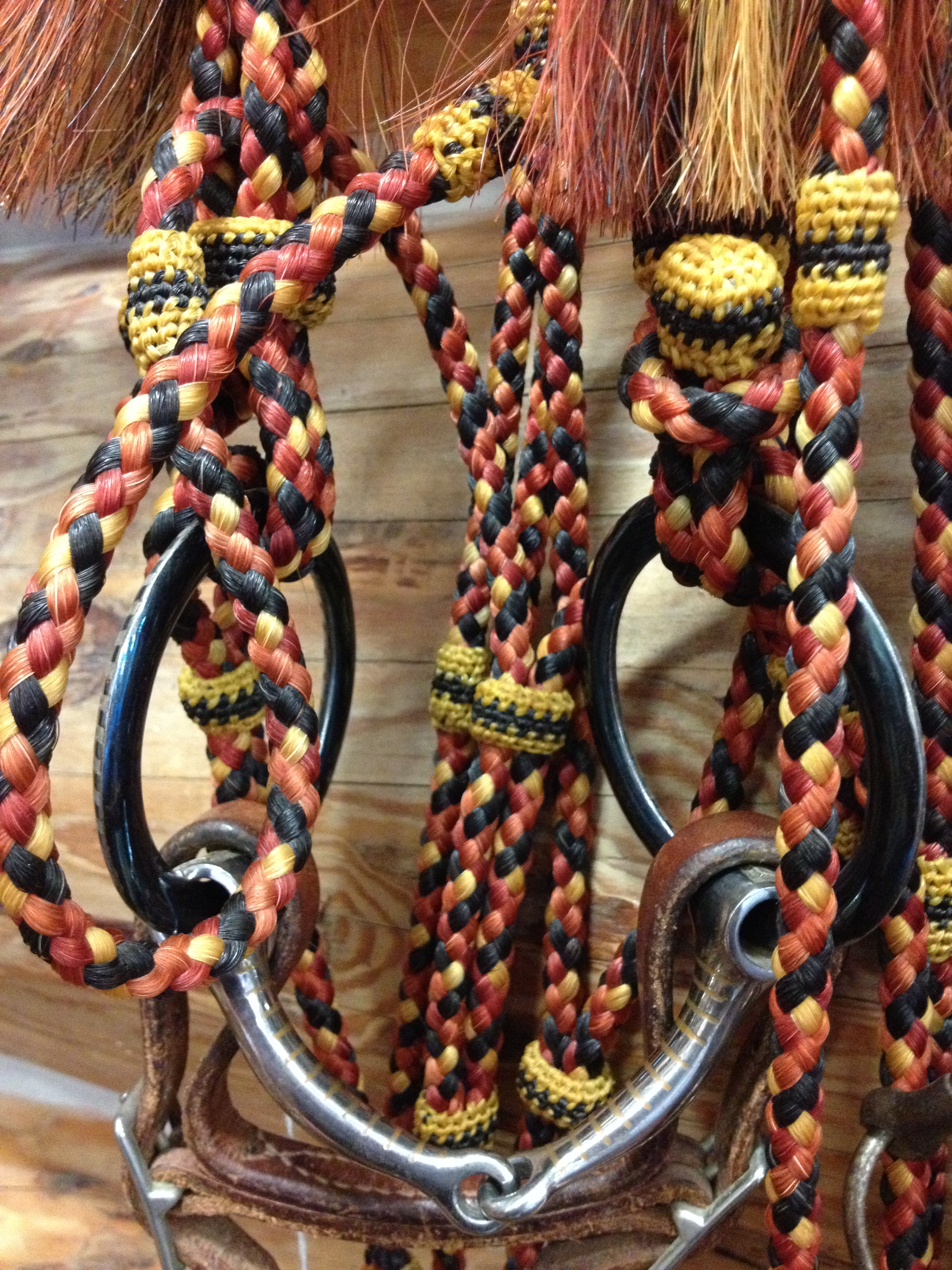
Horsehair bridle with snaffle bit, made at Montana State Prison ca. 1960

In the twenty years between 1959 and when the former facility was shut down in 1979, the Old Montana Prison struggled with the same problems which had plagued the institution for the entirety of its history: overcrowding, underfunding, and substandard conditions. The 1959 riot had raised awareness, but few Montanans recognized the problems or realized the extent of them.

=== 1975 Theater fire ===
On December 3, 1975, after the building was vacated after a showing of The ODESSA File, fire broke out in the WA Clark Theatre. The fire managed to burn for two and a half hours before a guard noticed smoke coming from the building, and by the time help arrived, it was too late. Warden Frank Conley's "proudest achievement" had been destroyed. The state fire marshal would later determine the fire had been caused by a "homemade incendiary device". The arsonist was never discovered, but the remaining cellblock was searched and the presence of contraband, including weapons, inspired Warden Crist to sentence a dozen inmates to the maximum security building, which had been closed for three years.

=== Retirement of the facility ===
Almost ten years after Warden Floyd Powell resigned, Governor Forrest Anderson, who had been instrumental in the negotiations which led to the end of the pea riot in 1957, managed to get the state legislature to approve $3.8 million to be used in the construction of a new facility, but the funds did not become available until 1973. In 1974, contractors broke ground on the new prison, situated about three miles (5 km) outside of Deer Lodge on 33,000 acres (130 km^{2}) which had once been Warden Conley's ranch. The construction continued for five years, and the last inmates were removed from the Old Montana Prison on September 5, 1979. The old facility had been added to the National Register of Historic Places in 1976, but, upon the removal of inmates from the facility, the state was at a loss as to what to do with it.

== New facility ==
=== 1991 riot ===
There was a prison riot on Sunday, September 22, 1991. The riot affected the center with maximum security prisoners. Five inmates were killed. They died due to being hanged. An official from the corrections department stated that four of the prisoners had informed on other prisoners. They had been placed in a protective custody status. An additional eight prisoners sustained injuries. The prison authorities chose to use force to end the standoff when they witnessed a prisoner receiving an assault.

In April of 2025, prison expansion project began, that was started due to overcrowding and lack of beds in the prison, which was going to add 117 beds to the state prison, but during construction the prison plumbing system fell apart, as a result the prison lacked plumbing for 3 weeks and water had to be brought in. As a result 700 million dollars were budgeted to improve the overall infrastructure of the prison, to improve the prison system of Montana and to add 1000 beds to the prison. The additional capacity will allow Montana to return out of state incarcerated back to Montana. The project is scheduled to finish in January of 2029.

== Notable inmates ==
=== Current ===
- Ronald Allen Smith (born 1957) - Double murderer on death row
- William Gollehon (born 1964) - Murderer of seven people, including six inmates at the prison, on death row
- George Harold Davis (born 1958) – perpetrator of the 2003 Ennis shooting
- Lloyd Barrus (born ~1956) – complicit in the killing of Broadwater County Deputy Mason Moore in a 2017 car chase shooting

=== Former ===
- Douglas Turner (1971–2003) - Murderer of nine people, including six inmates at the prison along William Gollehon, committed suicide on death row
- Nathaniel Bar-Jonah (1957–2008) – child predator and suspected cannibalistic serial killer; died of a heart attack at MSP
- Louis Brown (c.1904–????) – accomplice of spree killer Phillip J. Coleman
- Ray Dempsey Gardner (1922–1951) – serial killer; served time in several prisons for minor crimes, including MSP
- Leland Jensen (1914–1996) – cult leader; served four years for sexually abusing a 15-year-old girl

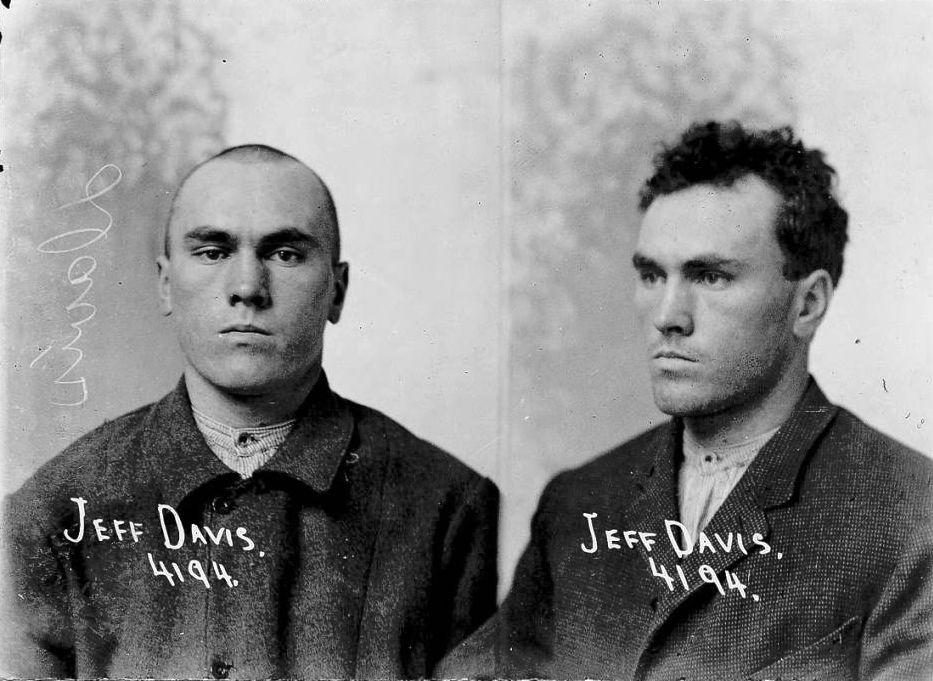
Carl Panzram, under the alias Jefferson Davis, at Deer Lodge State Prison 1913

- Carl Panzram (1891–1930) – serial killer and career criminal; served time in many prisons, including MSP 1913-1915
- Robert Vanella (1879–1928) – Five Points Gang member; served six years for murder
- Ronald James Ward (1966–2014) – serial killer; died of undisclosed causes at MSP

==== Executed ====
- David Thomas Dawson (1957–2006) – killed a family of three; executed by lethal injection
- Terry Langford (1966–1998) – murderer and suspected serial killer; executed by lethal injection
- Duncan McKenzie (1951–1995) – murdered a school teacher; executed by lethal injection

The city of Deer Lodge purchased the campus and turned the care of it over to the Powell County Museum and Arts Foundation. The prison is now the Old Prison Museum, a complex that includes tours of the historic prison and buildings housing other collections.

- The Montana Auto Museum, operated by the Montana Auto Association, features many historic cars and trucks.
- The Frontier Montana Museum features collections of handguns, cowboy gear and collectibles, whiskey and saloon memorabilia.
- The Powell County Museum's displays include mining, carving and local history.
- Yesterday's Playthings is a collection of dolls and toys.

== References in popular culture ==
The 1975 film Rancho Deluxe directed by Frank Perry and starring Jeff Bridges, Sam Waterston, Elizabeth Ashley & Harry Dean Stanton. The end of this film, when the main characters are convicted of cattle rustling, was filmed at the prison ranch and closes the film with the iconic "Montana Prison Ranch" sign and ranch gate.

The 1982 film Fast-Walking directed by James B. Harris and starring James Woods, Tim McIntire, Kay Lenz, M. Emmet Walsh and Susan Tyrell was partly filmed in the prison.

The 1983 Hank Williams Jr. song "Twodot Montana" mentions the Montana territory prison in Deer Lodge.

The 1985 film Runaway Train directed by Andrei Konchalovsky and starring Jon Voight, Eric Roberts, Rebecca De Mornay, John P. Ryan & Edward Bunker was partly shot at the prison.

The 1992 film Diggstown directed by Michael Ritchie and starring James Woods, Louis Gossett Jr., Oliver Platt, Heather Graham & Bruce Dern was partly shot at the prison.

The 1994 film F.T.W., directed by Michael Karbelnikoff and starring Mickey Rourke, Lori Singer, Peter Berg & Brion James was partly filmed at the prison.

The 2006 film Love Comes to the Executioner directed by Kyle W. Bergerson and starring Jonathan Tucker, Jeremy Renner and Ginnifer Goodwin was partly filmed at the prison.

In 2008 CBS show Criminal Minds season 4 episode 2 ("The Angel Maker") aired October 1, 2008; used exterior shots of the prison to portray it as a Cincinnati prison where scenes take place in.

The prison was used as inspiration for the Hope County Jail in the 2018 Video Game Far Cry 5.

The 2024 film The Unholy Trinity directed by Richard Gray and starring Pierce Brosnan, Samuel L. Jackson, Brandon Lessard, Tim Daly & David Arquette was partly filmed at the prison.

== Sources ==
- Baumler, Ellen (2008), Dark Spaces: Montana's Historic Penitentiary at Deer Lodge, Albuquerque, New Mexico: University of New Mexico Press
- Edgerton, Keith (2004), Montana Justice: Power, Punishment, & the Penitentiary, Seattle, Washington: University of Washington Press
- Erickson, Martin, Vengeance Is Mine…, Deer Lodge, Montana: Powell County Museum and Arts Foundation
- Giles, Kevin S. (2005), Jerry's Riot: The True Story of Montana's 1959 Prison Disturbance, United States of America: Sky Blue Waters Press
- Kent, Philip (1979), Montana State Prison History, Deer Lodge, Montana: Powell County Museum and Arts Foundation
