= William Gollehon and Douglas Turner =

American murders

William Gollehon
- Born: 1964; Washington, U.S.
- Convictions: Deliberate homicide (7 counts); Kidnapping (2 counts); Burglary (2 counts); Aggravated assault (Note: This offense along with 1 of the burglary counts was for a case unrelated to the murders.)
- Penalty: Death + life imprisonment

Details
- Victims: 7 (6 with Turner)
- Span of crimes: 1985–1991
- Country: United States
- State: Montana

Douglas Turner
- Born: c. 1971; Glendive, Montana, U.S.
- Died: July 8, 2003; Deer Lodge, Montana, U.S.
- Convictions: Deliberate homicide (9 counts); Burglary (Note: This offense was for the 1987 murders.); Kidnapping
- Penalty: Death + life imprisonment

Details
- Victims: 9 (6 with Gollehon)
- Span of crimes: 1987–1991
- Country: United States
- State: Montana

William Jay Gollehon and Douglas Duane Turner (born 1964) were a pair of American serial killers who committed six killings at Montana State Prison, five of which were committed during a riot on September 22, 1991. Both were previously convicted of other murders (Gollehon with one and Turner with three) and would receive a death sentence plus multiple life sentences for the prison murders. Gollehon remains on death row, while Turner died by suicide in 2003. Altogether, the two committed a combined total of ten murders.

== List of victims ==
Gollehon only.

- Brenda Bargas, 34 - August 22, 1985, Billings, Montana

Turner only.

- James Brooks, age unknown - November 19, 1987, Glendive, Montana
- Ora Brooks, age unknown - November 19, 1987, Glendive, Montana
- Sharon Brooks, age unknown - November 19, 1987, Glendive, Montana

As a group in prison.

- Gerald Pileggi, age unknown - September 2, 1990, Deer Lodge, Montana
- Vern Baker, 24 - September 22, 1991, Deer Lodge, Montana
- Edmund Davidson, 33 - September 22, 1991, Deer Lodge, Montana
- Gary Evans, 26 - September 22, 1991, Deer Lodge, Montana
- Ernest Holliday, 38 - September 22, 1991, Deer Lodge, Montana
- Ernest Mazurkiewicz, 32 - September 22, 1991, Deer Lodge, Montana

Gollehon and Turner were sentenced to death for the murder of Pileggi. They also received life sentences for the five 1991 murders. In addition, the two were convicted of other crimes for the 1991 incident. Gollehon was convicted of kidnapping and burglary while Turner was convicted of kidnapping.

== Montana Prison Riot ==
The 1991 murders of five inmates occurred during a riot at the prison which also left eight other inmates injured. Thirteen other prisoners were also convicted of carrying out the riot, including death row inmate Terry Langford, who was executed in 1998 for his original crime. Robert Wild and Gary Cox were each convicted of five counts of deliberate homicide as well as burglary and kidnapping for the riot. Robert Close was convicted of the same crimes as Wild and Cox with the exception of kidnapping. He was however, found guilty of sexual intercourse without consent. Reed Nevins was also convicted of the same crimes as Wild and Cox, albeit four less homicide charges. Close and Nevins had prior murder convictions before participating in the riot. Close had killed Billy Joe Hall in 1974, while Nevins killed Carolyn Culbert in 1984. Among the other inmates involved were Kenneth Allen and Joseph Milinovich, who each pleaded guilty to one count of mitigated deliberate homicide, a lesser degree of murder in Montana. Milinovich also pleaded guilty to one count of burglary. The six other inmates who participated in the riot were Ben Cook, Harold Gleed, Daniel Lopez, Steve Ritchson, Scott Seeley and Brian Spray. The group was convicted of various crimes in connection with the riot, ranging from homicide, burglary, rape, assault, rioting, kidnapping and criminal mischief. One of the deceased victims of the riot, Ernest Mazurkiewicz, was a murderer himself. In July 1989, he and several others robbed then killed Larry Beckwith by shooting him in Broadwater County. One of his accomplices was Joseph Milinovich, who would later become one of the many perpetrators involved in the 1991 riot that killed him and the four other inmates. In 2008, riot participant Daniel Lopez, fled Montana while on parole which then led to a nationwide manhunt. He was arrested by U.S. Marshals in Albuquerque, New Mexico two years later.

== See also ==
- Ronald Allen Smith - Montana's only other death row inmate
- Montana State Prison
- List of death row inmates in the United States
- List of serial killers in the United States
- Capital punishment in Montana
