= Duncan McKenzie (murderer) =

American murderer (1951–1995)

- McKenzie in 1990
- Born: October 5, 1951; Chicago, Illinois, U.S.
- Died: May 10, 1995 (aged 43); Montana State Prison, Montana, U.S.
- Status: Executed by lethal injection
- Convictions: Deliberate homicide Aggravated kidnapping Sexual intercourse without consent Second degree assault
- Penalty: Death (March 3, 1975)

Details
- Victims: Debra Prety, 15; Lana Harding, 23
- Date: October 26, 1973; January 21, 1974
- Country: United States
- States: Idaho and Montana

Duncan Peder McKenzie Jr. (October 5, 1951 – May 10, 1995) was an American murderer who was convicted of the murder of a schoolteacher from Conrad, Montana named Lana Harding on January 21, 1974. After his conviction in March 1975, he spent 20 years on death row, receiving eight stays of execution. His ninth stay of execution was denied by the United States courts of appeals.

After exhausting all legal avenues, McKenzie was executed on May 10, 1995. He was the first person executed in Montana since 1943, and also the first ever U.S. death row inmate to spend twenty years or more on death row and still eventually be executed. He is one of only three people to have been executed in Montana since the reinstatement of the death penalty. McKenzie, who maintained his innocence to the end, was executed involuntarily.

In 2021, DNA tests posthumously linked McKenzie to a separate rape and murder of a 15-year-old girl in Idaho in 1973. The police publicized their findings in 2023. McKenzie had long been a suspect in the murder, but had refused to admit his guilt for any of his crimes and had rejected pleas from the girl's family to confess to her murder prior to his execution.

== Background ==
McKenzie was born on October 5, 1951, in Chicago, Illinois. He married Shirley Marlene McKenzie (born July 1943). They had three children together, Richard, Michelle, and Jon and lived in Coeur d'Alene, Idaho at the time of his incarceration. Shirley died in May 2017 at Coeur d'Alene, Idaho.

== Crime overview ==
In 1970, McKenzie severely beat a woman named Barbara Stiffarm in Blaine County, Montana. The woman, clad only in a blouse, was found crawling alongside a roadway. McKenzie was sentenced to three years in prison for second degree assault and paroled in 1972. His prior conviction was later cited as an aggravating factor for the imposition of his death sentence. McKenzie proclaimed his innocence in this case.

McKenzie was convicted of the murder, rape, and death by asphyxia of Lana Harding. He was sentenced to death for aggravated kidnapping. The crime was committed on January 21, 1974, in the early morning. Harding was a schoolteacher in a small one-classroom schoolhouse and members of the community raised concerns of her well-being when she did not arrive at the school and her shoes were left in the driveway.

== Death row ==
He waited on death row for twenty years from 1975 to 1995. He was one of three inmates to be sentenced with the reinstated death penalty in Montana. The other two sentenced were Bernard Fitzpatrick and Dewey Coleman, although their appeals to their own executions were successful.

== Execution ==
McKenzie was executed on May 10, 1995, at Montana State Prison, becoming the first person to be executed in Montana since 1943. His last meal was tenderloin steak, french fries, a tossed salad, orange sherbet and whole milk. Upon his request, he was allowed to listen to country music as he was put to death. McKenzie remains the first of only three people to be executed in Montana since the resumption of capital punishment. The others were Terry Allen Langford in 1998 and David Thomas Dawson in 2006.

== Aftermath ==
In 2021, DNA tests linked McKenzie to the rape and murder of 15-year-old Debra Prety in Coeur d'Alene, Idaho in October 1973, days before Halloween. McKenzie abducted and strangled Prety as she was returning home from a school dance. McKenzie had long been a suspect in her murder, but had not confessed to killing her before his execution. A DNA sample showed that the odds of the killer being someone other than McKenzie were 7.08 sextillion to one.

== See also ==
- Capital punishment in Montana
- List of people executed in Montana
- List of people executed in the United States in 1995

Preceded by Phillip J. Coleman Jr.	Executions carried out in Montana	Succeeded by Terry Allen Langford
