= David Thomas Dawson =

American murderer (1957–2006)

- Born: October 20, 1957; San Diego, California, U.S.
- Died: August 11, 2006 (aged 48); Montana State Prison, Montana, U.S.
- Status: Executed by lethal injection
- Convictions: Deliberate homicide (3 counts); Aggravated Kidnapping (4 counts); Robbery
- Penalty: Death (April 15, 1987)

Details
- Victims: 3
- Date: April 19, 1986
- Country: United States
- State: Montana

David Thomas Dawson (October 20, 1957 – August 11, 2006) was an American convicted murderer who was executed at Montana State Prison in Deer Lodge, Montana. Dawson was executed for the April 1986 murders of the Rodstein family in Billings, Montana. He remains the most recent person executed in Montana.

== Early life ==
Dawson was born on October 20, 1957, in San Diego, California. He was the second of three children and had two sisters. His father reportedly owned several businesses that failed, and the family moved around states when he was younger, moving to California, Colorado, Florida, and Montana. As a child, Dawson was described as sickly and clumsy and had difficulty making friends. He married as a young adult and reportedly may have fathered a daughter. The couple divorced, however. In the early 1980s, Dawson moved to Montana to work in construction and found work in Colstrip. He rented an apartment in Billings, where he stayed on weekends. Dawson was reportedly deeply involved in drugs, including marijuana and methamphetamine. Before the Rodstein family murders, he worked as a construction worker and was described by Greg Tuttle Of the Billings Gazette as a drug addict.

== Murders ==
On April 18, 1986, Dawson broke into a motel room that was occupied by the Rodstein family in Billings, Montana. He forced the Rodstein family to go to his room at the same motel, which was located directly next door to their own room. He bound the family of four with tape, gagged them, and took their money. Over the next two days, Dawson strangled three of the four family members: 39-year-old David Rodstein, his wife 39-year-old Monica, and their 11-year-old son Andrew. Their 15-year-old daughter Amy was found alive in Dawson's motel room two days after the murders.

== Sentencing and execution ==
The trial for Dawson came to a close in February 1987. The jury deliberated for about 14 hours and returned with guilty verdicts for three counts of deliberate homicide, four guilty verdicts for kidnapping each member of the Rodstein family, and a guilty verdict for robbery. On April 15, 1987, Dawson was sentenced to death by District Judge Diane Barz. Dawson waived the ability to appeal his conviction and sentence.

Dawson's last meal consisted of two double cheeseburgers, two large servings of french fries, half a gallon of vanilla fudge ripple ice cream, and two bottles of Dr Pepper. When asked if he had any last words, Dawson said "No." He was executed by lethal injection on August 11, 2006, under the authority of the state of Montana. It was the first execution in Montana in more than eight years. Dawson remains the third of only three people to be executed in Montana since the resumption of the death penalty. The others were Duncan McKenzie in 1995 and Terry Langford in 1998.

As of 2026, Dawson remains the most recent person to be executed by the state of Montana, which has gone over twenty years without an execution.

== See also ==
- Capital punishment in Montana
- List of most recent executions by jurisdiction
- List of people executed in Montana
- List of people executed in the United States in 2006
- Volunteer (capital punishment)

Preceded by Terry Allen Langford	Executions carried out in Montana	Succeeded by None
