= List of people executed in Montana =

The following is a list of people executed by the U.S. state of Montana since capital punishment was resumed in 1976.

A total of three people convicted of murder have been executed since the Gregg v. Georgia decision, all by lethal injection. David Dawson waived his appeals and asked that his execution be carried out.

== List of people executed in Montana since 1976 ==
No.	Name	Race	Age	Sex	Date of execution	County	Method	Victim(s)	Governor	Ref.
1	Duncan Peder McKenzie Jr.	White	43	M	May 10, 1995	Pondera	Lethal injection	Lana Harding (Note: Also killed Debra Prety in Idaho, but was executed for killing Harding.)	Marc Racicot	Ref.
2	Terry Allen Langford	White	31	M	February 24, 1998	Powell	Lethal injection	Ned Blackwood and Celene Blackwood	Marc Racicot	
3	David Thomas Dawson	White	48	M	August 11, 2006	Yellowstone	Lethal injection	David Rodstein, Monica Rodstein, and Andrew Rodstein	Brian Schweitzer	

== Demographics ==
Race
White	3	100%
Age
30–39	1	33%
40–49	2	67%
Sex
Male	3	100%
Date of execution
1976–1979	0	0%
1980–1989	0	0%
1990–1999	2	67%
2000–2009	1	33%
2010–2019	0	0%
2020–2029	0	0%
Method
Lethal injection	3	100%
Governor (Party)
Thomas Lee Judge (D)	0	0%
Ted Schwinden (D)	0	0%
Stan Stephens (R)	0	0%
Marc Racicot (R)	2	67%
Judy Martz (R)	0	0%
Brian Schweitzer (D)	1	33%
Steve Bullock (D)	0	0%
Greg Gianforte (R)	0	0%
Total	3	100%

== See also ==
- Capital punishment in Montana
- Capital punishment in the United States
- List of people executed in Montana (pre-1972)
