= Terry Langford =

American murderer (1966–1998)

- Born: Terry Allen Langford; May 18, 1966; Lebanon, Kentucky, U.S.
- Died: February 24, 1998 (aged 31); Montana State Prison, Montana, U.S.
- Status: Executed by lethal injection
- Convictions: Deliberate homicide (3 counts); Burglary
- Penalty: Death (January 26, 1989)

Details
- Victims: 3–7
- Date: July 5, 1988; September 22, 1991
- Country: United States
- State: Montana

Terry Allen Langford (May 18, 1966 – February 24, 1998) was an American convicted murderer who was executed by lethal injection in Montana. Langford was executed for the July 1988 murders of Ned and Celene Blackwood, in Ovando, Montana. His case was profiled in the true crime television series, Stolen Voices, Buried Secrets.

== Early life ==
Langford was born on May 18, 1966, in Lebanon, Kentucky. Not much is known about his early life other than he was a drifter who resided in Raleigh, North Carolina. According to the North Carolina Department of Public Safety, Langford was convicted of forgery and tampering with a motor vehicle in the summer of 1987. As both charges were misdemeanors he received no jail time.

== Murders ==
In June 1988, Langford traveled to Ovando, Montana, by bus. He hiked north toward a mountainous area, ending up on the property of Ned and Celene Blackwood. He watched their movements from a distance for several days before entering the home on July 5, 1988, murdering them and stealing their belongings.

After the killings he traveled to Jeffersonville, Indiana, where he stayed at a motel. The following morning, he pulled a knife on a maid when she entered his room. Langford fled, discarding a bag in a nearby wooded area, which contained the stolen guns of the Blackwood's. A criminal records check of the guns showed they belonged to the murdered couple. Afterwards, he was tracked down and apprehended.

He was convicted of murdering the couple and was sentenced to death upon his own request on January 26, 1989. While on death row in Montana State Prison, Langford killed a fellow inmate during a riot on September 22, 1991, in which five inmates were killed. He was convicted of deliberate homicide and given a life term without parole. Langford was acquitted of four other counts of deliberate homicide.

== Execution ==
Although Langford had initially requested a death sentence, he later changed his mind and appealed his sentence. After exhausting his appeals, Langford was executed on February 24, 1998, at Montana State Prison. He declined to make a final statement. At 31 years old, he was the youngest inmate put to death in Montana since capital punishment was reinstated in 1976. Langford remains the second of only three people to be executed in Montana since the resumption of capital punishment. The others were Duncan Peder McKenzie Jr. in 1995 and David Thomas Dawson in 2006.

== See also ==
- Capital punishment in Montana
- List of people executed in Montana
- List of people executed in the United States in 1998

Preceded by Duncan Peder McKenzie Jr.	Executions carried out in Montana	Succeeded by David Thomas Dawson
