= Capital punishment in Montana =

Capital punishment is a legal penalty in the U.S. state of Montana.

The state has not carried out an execution in over nineteen years, with its last execution carried out in 2006, when David Thomas Dawson was executed. Montana currently has two men on death row: Ronald Allen Smith and William Jay Gollehon. Since 2015, there has been a de facto moratorium on capital punishment in Montana as a result of a court ruling that found that the state's lethal injection method violated the Montana Constitution.

== History ==
On June 29, 1972, the U.S. Supreme Court in Furman v. Georgia found that state death penalty statutes were unconstitutional because their arbitrary enforcement amounted to "cruel and unusual punishment," which the Eighth Amendment of the U.S. Constitution prohibits. As a result of the Furman decision, the overall application of the death penalty in the United States was suspended. The suspension prompted states to amend their death penalty statutes to comply with the Furman decision.

In 1974, Montana amended its death penalty law and instituted a mandatory death penalty statute for the offenses of deliberate homicide and aggravated kidnapping.

On July 2, 1976, the U.S. Supreme Court in Gregg v. Georgia held that "the punishment of death does not invariably violate the Constitution."

== Execution methods ==
Until the mid-nineteen hundreds, Montana utilized hanging as its method of execution for individuals sentenced to death. Montana's last execution by hanging was carried out in 1943.

In 1983, Montana introduced lethal injection. On May 10, 1995, the first person put to death by lethal injection in Montana was Duncan Peder McKenzie Jr., who was convicted of deliberate homicide and aggravated kidnapping.

In 1997, lethal injection became the sole method of execution in Montana. The 1997 amendment removed the following language from Montana Code Annotated § 46-19-103(3): "hanging the defendant by the neck until he is dead or, at the election of the defendant."

Today, lethal injection remains Montana's only recognized method of execution. No other state, aside from Montana, requires the use of "an ultra-fast-acting barbiturate" for an execution by lethal injection.

Although lethal gas was authorized as a method of execution in 1983, Montana has never carried out any executions under this method.

== Legal process ==
=== Capital crimes ===
Under Montana law, deliberate homicide is punishable by death when committed:

1. "by an offender while in official detention;"
2. "by an offender who had been previously convicted of another deliberate homicide;"
3. "by means of torture;"
4. "by an offender lying in wait or ambush;"
5. "as a part of a scheme or operation that, if completed, would result in the death of more than one person;"
6. "by an offender during the course of committing sexual assault, sexual intercourse without consent, deviate sexual conduct, or incest, and the victim was less than 18 years of age."
7. against "a peace officer killed while performing the officer's duty."

The offense of aggravated kidnapping, in which the victim or a rescuer dies, is also punishable by death.

Montana law still provides the death penalty for the following non-homicidal crimes:

- attempted deliberate homicide, aggravated assault, or aggravated kidnapping committed while in detention, and such person has a prior deliberate homicide conviction or was found to be a persistent felon; and
- sexual intercourse without consent by a person with a prior record for sexual intercourse without consent, which resulted in serious bodily injury.

The death penalty for these non-homicidal crimes is no longer constitutional since the 2008 U.S. Supreme Court case Kennedy v. Louisiana.

Montana has not established a minimum age for someone to receive a death sentence. The state, however, does consider the age of the offender to be a mitigating circumstance if the offender was under 18 at the time of the offense.

=== Sentencing ===
A hearing is held to determine whether the death penalty should be given. Before 2001, the trial judge reached this decision alone. Montana now has a "hybrid" scheme, whereby the trial judge still makes the sentencing decision, but the jury now takes part in the fact-finding process as it relates to a finding of an aggravating circumstance beyond a reasonable doubt.

=== Clemency ===
A person sentenced to death in Montana can seek clemency from the governor by submitting an application for clemency provided that any automatic review action conducted by the Montana Supreme Court of the person's sentence of death has ended. The application for clemency must be submitted to the Montana Board of Pardons and Parole within 10 days following the district court's determination of the date upon which the person is expected to be executed. Only the person sentenced to death, their attorney, or a "court-appointed next friend, guardian, or conservator acting on the person's behalf" can submit an application for clemency. While the Montana Board of Pardons and Parole may advise the governor on whether to grant or deny an application for clemency, the ultimate decision rests with the governor.

To date, Montana has only granted 1 clemency. In December 1988, Governor Ted Schwinden granted clemency to David Cameron Keith and reduced his sentence to life in prison without the possibility of parole. David Cameron Keith received a sentence of death for aggravated kidnapping in March 1988 and was scheduled to be executed on January 20, 1989. The Montana Board of Pardons and Parole recommended clemency for David Cameron Keith, in part because he was "partially paralyzed and nearly blind from gunshot wounds, ha[d] undergone a legitimate religious conversion and may have shot his victim in reflex to being shot himself." At the time, Governor Schwinden stated his decision to grant David Cameron Keith clemency was "based on his review of Keith's file, a meeting with Keith at the state prison [] and a telephone conversation with the family of the victim, Harry Lee Shryock Jr."

In 2012, Ronald Allen Smith – one of two men presently on death row – requested clemency. On May 2, 2012, Smith's clemency hearing was held. Following Smith's hearing, the Montana Board of Pardons and Parole made its recommendation to then-Governor Brian Schweitzer that Smith's application for clemency should be denied. Governor Brian Schweitzer did not render a decision on Smith's request for clemency.

== People executed in Montana ==
From 1608 to 1976, Montana executed 71 people by hanging. Since 1976, three males have been executed in Montana by lethal injection: Duncan Peder McKenzie Jr., Terry Allen Langford, and David Thomas Dawson.

On May 10, 1995, Duncan Peder McKenzie Jr. was the first person executed in Montana by lethal injection. McKenzie Jr. was sentenced to death for deliberate homicide and aggravated kidnapping. He was 43 years old when he was executed.

On February 24, 1998, Terry Allen Langford was the second person to be executed in Montana by lethal injection. Langford was sentenced to death for two counts of deliberate homicide and two counts of aggravated kidnapping. He was 31 years old when he was executed.

On August 11, 2006, David Thomas Dawson was the third person to be executed in Montana by lethal injection. Dawson was sentenced to death for three counts of deliberate homicide and three counts of aggravated kidnapping. He was 49 years old when he was executed.

== People on death row in Montana ==
There are presently two men on death row in Montana: William Jay Gollehon and Ronald Allen Smith. Both men have been on death row for more than three decades.

In 1983, Ronald Allen Smith was sentenced to death for two counts of aggravated kidnapping and two counts of deliberate homicide for murdering two Native American men while on LSD. On November 3, 2010, a judge set Smith's execution date for January 31, 2011. The execution was stayed because of Smith's ongoing litigation about the constitutionality of Montana's lethal injection method.

In 1992, William Jay Gollehon was sentenced to death for the deliberate homicide of another prisoner.

== Legal challenges to Montana's lethal injection method ==
In 2008, the ACLU of Montana brought a civil legal action – Smith v. Ferriter – on behalf of Ronald Allen Smith, which alleged that Montana's lethal injection method violated Montana's Constitution. William Jay Gollehon later joined the suit.

In 2011, Ronald Allen Smith's execution was "stayed" because of the ongoing lawsuit.

On September 6, 2012, the Montana First Judicial District Court handed down its decision on the case. Judge Jeffrey Sherlock, who presided over the case, ruled that three components of Montana's lethal injection method "create[d] a substantial risk of serious harm" to Plaintiffs' Smith and Gollehon.

First, the Court found that the three-drug lethal injection method – sodium pentothal, pancuronium bromide, and potassium chloride – put forth by the Montana Department of Corrections in its Execution Technical Manual failed to satisfy the requirements set out by the legislature in Montana Annotated Code § 46-19-103(3), which requires the use of two, not three drugs: "an ultra-fast-acting barbiturate in combination with a chemical paralytic agent."

Second, the Court found that Montana, in comparison to other states, does not require the "setup officer" – the individual placing the intravenous – to have relevant intravenous experience. In Montana, the "set up" officer just needs to have an Emergency Medical Technician certification. The Court noted that Montana's intravenous protocol, with respect to administration, was "less rigorous" and "less demanding" than that of other states.

Finally, the Court found that an individual with medical experience and not the warden of the Montana State Prison – as Montana protocol permits – should be the one to make the determination of whether a person is unconscious after receiving the first drug as part of the execution. The Court noted that "[s]ince the determination of consciousness is such a crucial step, someone with a modicum of medical training should be involved in that determination."

The Court ultimately concluded that Article II, sections 4 and 22 of the Montana Constitution were violated. Article II, section 4 relates to individual dignity and states that "[t]he dignity of the human being is inviolable." Article II, section 22 governs excessive sanctions and states that "[e]xcessive bail shall not be required, or excessive fines imposed, or cruel and unusual punishments inflicted." The Court directed Montana's Department of Corrections to change its protocol to comply with the Montana Constitution. The decision gave rise to a moratorium on executions in the state.

In January 2013, the Montana Department of Corrections amended its protocol to include only two drugs: sodium pentothal and pancuronium bromide, thereby removing potassium chloride from its lethal injection method. The Department noted that "Drugs listed [in its protocol] may be substituted with another equivalent type drug if drug listed becomes unavailable." The unavailability of sodium pentothal led the Department to choose pentobarbital as its replacement.

That same year, the ACLU challenged the Department's revised two-drug lethal injection method, claiming that the new protocol violated the Montana Constitution.

In 2014, the Court ruled that there remained a "disputed issue of material fact as to what the Montana legislature meant by using the words 'ultra-fast-acting barbiturate' and, further, whether pentobarbital is an ultra-fast-acting barbiturate."

On October 6, 2015, Judge Jeffrey Sherlock ruled that pentobarbital could not be characterized as an "ultra-fast-acting barbiturate," which the Montana statute required. Judge Sherlock noted in his decision that "while pentobarbital may operate in a fast nature, it is not ultra-fast as is required to comply with Montana's execution protocol." As a result, the Court prohibited Montana from using pentobarbital as part of its lethal injection method. The Court directed the state to either find a replacement barbiturate that complied with the statute or revise the law itself to permit the use of pentobarbital, noting that "[Montana's] remedy is to ask the Legislature to modify the statute to allow the use of pentobarbital or other slower acting drugs." As a result, a de facto moratorium on executions in Montana was put in place.

== Legislative action to continue lethal injections in Montana ==
In 2021, legislative action was undertaken to reinstitute lethal injections in Montana. House Bill 244, sponsored by Representative Dennis Lenz, proposed rewriting provisions of Montana Code Annotated § 46-19-103(3), which governs the state's lethal injection method. Specifically, HB 244 proposed eliminating § 46-19-103(3)'s requirement of an "ultra-fast-acting barbiturate" and amending the provision to read: "The punishment of death must be inflicted by administration of an intravenous injection of a substance or substances in a lethal quantity sufficient to cause death until a coroner or deputy coroner pronounces that the defendant is dead." HB 244 died in the Senate.

In 2023, Senate Bill 439, sponsored by Representative Barry Usher, proposed the same revision to Montana Code Annotated § 46-19-103(3) as did House Bill 244, introduced in 2021. SB 439 died in process.

While the death penalty remains legal in Montana, the de facto moratorium placed on executions in 2015 remains in effect.

== Attempts to abolish Montana's death penalty ==
Since 1999, there have been multiple attempts by Montana legislators who oppose the death penalty to do away with its use in the state and replace it with life imprisonment without the possibility of parole. To date, no bill has reached the Governor. Bills advanced in 2007 (SB 306), 2009 (SB 236), and 2011 (SB 185) to end the death penalty in Montana all passed the Senate but were tabled by the House Judiciary Committee. The latest bill to abolish the death penalty was introduced by Representative Ed Stafman in 2021. The bill – House Bill No. 335 – was tabled by the House Judiciary Committee.

== See also ==
- List of people executed in Montana
- List of death row inmates in the United States § Montana
- Crime in Montana
- Law of Montana
