= Ronald Allen Smith =

Canadian murderer on death row in the U.S. (born 1957)

- Born: September 7, 1957 (age 69); Red Deer, Alberta, Canada
- Status: Incarcerated
- Convictions: Aggravated kidnapping (2 counts); Deliberate homicide (2 counts); Committed with dangerous weapon Escape
- Penalty: Death

Details
- Killed: 2

Ronald Allen Smith (born September 7, 1957) is a Canadian man who was sentenced to death in Montana for murdering two people. As of 2019, Smith is one of two prisoners on Montana's death row (the other is William Gollehon). Judge Jeffrey Sherlock granted Smith a stay of execution so his civil lawsuit challenging the constitutionality of lethal injection could be decided.

== Murder in Montana ==
Smith was sentenced to death in March 1983 after he asked for the death penalty after his conviction. Seven months earlier, he, along with an accomplice, who were both under the influence of LSD, killed two Native American men who offered them a ride while hitchhiking. They marched cousins Harvey Mad Man, 23, and Thomas Running Rabbit, 20, into the woods by the highway and shot them both in the head with a sawn-off .22-calibre rifle.

Smith refused a plea deal that would have seen him avoid death row but spend his life in prison. He pleaded guilty three weeks later and then asked for — and was given — a death sentence. Later he changed his mind. Smith has had several previous execution dates, but each has been overturned. In November 2001, the United States Supreme Court denied a petition for review, and in 2010 The U.S. Supreme Court refused to hear his final appeal. The case was sent back to the State of Montana for another date for the execution.

== Canadian government involvement ==
The Government of Canada had maintained an interest in Smith's case since 1983, with Canadian consular officials communicating with some regularity with Smith, with his lawyers, with prison officials, with the Office of the Governor of Montana, with other Montana state officials, and with the U.S. Department of State.

In 1997, Canadian consular officials requested clemency for Smith on humanitarian grounds, and the governor of Montana showed some sympathy for these requests.

In October/November 2007, however, the government of Canada announced that it would not seek clemency for Smith. Whereas Canadian government policy had always been to seek clemency through diplomatic channels for Canadians sentenced to death in foreign countries, the government now announced a new policy: "that multiple murderers and mass murderers who are convicted in a democracy that adheres to the rule of law cannot necessarily count on a plea for clemency from the Canadian government and patriation back to this country." As of 2023, Smith remained on Montana's death row.

Counsel for Smith launched a proceeding in Canada's Federal Court against the cabinet ministers responsible for the change in Canada's policy. In a decision rendered on March 4, 2009, Mr. Justice Barnes found that the Canadian government did not have a coherent new policy on seeking clemency in death-penalty cases, and therefore, the government was required to apply the former policy to Smith's case. The court did not determine whether there is, generally, a legal duty on the government to help its citizens sentenced to death abroad; rather, the court based its decision on issues of procedural fairness, holding that before withdrawing support of Smith's clemency application, the government had a duty to consult fully with Smith and his legal advisors, followed by a fair and objective consideration of the appropriateness of applying any new policy to the facts of his case. As a result, the court ordered the Government of Canada to "take all reasonable steps to support [Smith's] case for clemency before the governor of Montana and his advisors in accordance with the current government policy."

The government did not appeal the ruling of the Federal Court, and on June 19, 2009, Minister of Foreign Affairs Lawrence Cannon said that the government is complying with the court ruling. Earlier the same day, Cannon explained the government's policy as follows: "Our government respects the decisions made by sovereign, democratic states. We are determined to ensure that justice is served for Canadians abroad. In that regard, we will continue to study each instance on a case by case basis and, where appropriate, seek clemency for Canadians facing the death penalty abroad."

== Criminal record ==
Prisoner #20055 - Ronald Allen Smith's criminal record
Offense	Date of offense	Sentence
Escape	26-JAN-83	5 years
Committed w/dangerous weapon	26-JAN-83	2 years 6 months
Deliberate homicide	04-AUG-82	Death penalty
Aggravated kidnapping	04-AUG-82	5 years
Aggravated kidnapping	04-AUG-82	5 years

== See also ==
- List of death row inmates in the United States
