= List of death row inmates in the United States who have exhausted their appeals =

Death row inmates who have exhausted their appeals by county

An inmate is considered to have exhausted their appeals if their sentence has fully withstood the appellate process; this involves either the inmate's conviction and death sentence withstanding each stage of the appellate process or them waiving a part of the appellate process if a court has found them competent to do so. The following is a list of the stages in the appellate process that must be completed before the state can move forward with the inmate's execution:

1. The Direct Appeal
2. State Post-Conviction Review
3. Federal Habeas Corpus

Of those who have exhausted their appeals, some are immediately eligible to be executed but some are not. Some of the reasons that someone may not be immediately eligible for execution is a state moratorium on executions, a judicial stay of execution in their specific case, or their present incompetency to be executed.

== List of pending requests to set an execution date ==
No.	Name	Age of person			Gender	Race	State	Method	Ref.
No.	Name	Currently	At offense	Age difference	Gender	Race	State	Method	Ref.
1	Ernesto Salgado Martinez III (Note: The state's motion requested for an execution date of January 27, 2027, should the court enter an execution warrant.)	51	19	32	Male	Hispanic	Arizona	Lethal injection	Profile:
2	Todd Kelvin Wessinger	59	27	32	Male	Black	Louisiana	To be determined	Profile:
3	Robert Simon Jr.	63	26	37	Male	Black	Mississippi	Lethal injection	Profile:
4	Willie Jerome Manning	58	24	34	Male	Black	Mississippi	Lethal injection	Profile:
5	Clarence Rozell Goode Jr. (Note: The state's motion requested for an execution date of March 18, 2027, should the court enter an execution warrant.)	50	29	21	Male	Black	Oklahoma	Lethal injection	Profile:
6	Henry Eugene Hodges	60	23	37	Male	White	Tennessee	To be determined (Note: Since all offenders in Tennessee for whom an execution date was requested committed their offense before January 1, 1999, they can elect either electrocution or lethal injection. Should they not choose, the default method is lethal injection.)	Profile:
7	Farris Genner Morris Jr.	71	38	33	Male	Black	Tennessee	To be determined	Profile:
8	Jon Douglas Hall	62	29	33	Male	White	Tennessee	To be determined	Profile:
9	Kevin B. Burns	57	23	34	Male	Black	Tennessee	To be determined	Profile:
10	William Glenn Rogers	64	34	30	Male	White	Tennessee	To be determined	Profile:
11	Kennath Artez Henderson	52	23	29	Male	Black	Tennessee	To be determined	Profile:
12	Tony Egbuna Ford	53	18	35	Male	Black	Texas	Lethal injection	Profile:
13	Charles Don Flores	57	28	29	Male	Hispanic	Texas	Lethal injection	Profile:
14	Paul Gilbert Devoe III	63	43	20	Male	White	Texas	Lethal injection	Profile:

== Federal Government ==
- Exhausted their appeals: 0 (as of December 26, 2024)
- Immediately eligible for execution: 0
- Scheduled for execution: 0

== U.S. Military ==
- Exhausted their appeals: 4 (as of March 31, 2025)
- Immediately eligible for execution: 4
- Scheduled for execution: 1

Name	Place of crime	Notes
Hasan Karim Akbar	Camp Pennsylvania in Kuwait.	Final petition for a writ of certiorari denied by the United States Supreme Court on October 3, 2016. There is no legal impediment against Akbar's execution.
Ronald Adrin Gray	Fort Bragg military base in North Carolina.	Final petition for a writ of certiorari denied by the United States Supreme Court on June 28, 2018. There is no legal impediment against Gray's execution.
Timothy Baily Hennis	Fayetteville, North Carolina.	Final petition for a writ of certiorari denied by the United States Supreme Court on January 11, 2021. There is no legal impediment against Hennis's execution.
Nidal Malik Hasan	Fort Hood military base in Texas.	Final petition for a writ of certiorari denied by the United States Supreme Court on March 31, 2025. Scheduled to be executed on December 3, 2026.

== Alabama ==
- Exhausted their appeals: 23 (as of November 5, 2026)
- Immediately eligible for execution: 22
- Scheduled for execution: 0

Name	County	Prison Number	Notes
David Lee Roberts	Marion	0000Z560	Final petition for a writ of certiorari denied by the United States Supreme Court on January 14, 2013. Roberts' execution is stayed pending the completion of a competency review.
Artez Hammonds	Houston	0000Z630	Final petition for a writ of certiorari denied by the United States Supreme Court on October 1, 2018. There is no legal impediment against Hammonds's execution.
Bobby Wayne Waldrop	Randolph	0000Z661	Final petition for a writ of certiorari denied by the United States Supreme Court on October 1, 2018. There is no legal impediment against Waldrop's execution.
Jarrod Taylor	Mobile	0000Z638	Final petition for a writ of certiorari denied by the United States Supreme Court on May 13, 2019. There is no legal impediment against Taylor's execution.
Tony Barksdale	Tallapoosa	0000Z611	Final petition for a writ of certiorari denied by the United States Supreme Court on April 19, 2021. There is no legal impediment against Barksdale's execution.
Mark Allen Jenkins	St. Clair	0000Z527	Final petition for a writ of certiorari denied by the United States Supreme Court on May 17, 2021. There is no legal impediment against Jenkins's execution.
Eugene Milton Clemons II	Shelby	0000Z570	Final petition for a writ of certiorari denied by the United States Supreme Court on June 7, 2021. There is no legal impediment against Clemons's execution.
Charles Gregory Clark	Baldwin	0000Z669	Final petition for a writ of certiorari denied by the United States Supreme Court on February 22, 2022. There is no legal impediment against Clark's execution.
Donald Broadnax	Jefferson	0000Z620	Final petition for a writ of certiorari denied by the United States Supreme Court on March 21, 2022. There is no legal impediment against Broadnax's execution.
Timothy Wade Saunders	Baldwin	0000Z718	Final petition for a writ of certiorari denied by the United States Supreme Court on January 17, 2023. There is no legal impediment against Saunders's execution.
David Freeman	Montgomery	0000Z506	Final petition for a writ of certiorari denied by the United States Supreme Court on April 24, 2023. There is no legal impediment against Freeman's execution.
Thomas Dale Ferguson	Colbert	0000Z639	Final petition for a writ of certiorari denied by the United States Supreme Court on February 20, 2024. There is no legal impediment against Ferguson's execution.
Robert Shawn Ingram	Talladega	0000Z581	Final petition for a writ of certiorari denied by the United States Supreme Court on May 13, 2024. There is no legal impediment against Ingram's execution.
Ellis Louis Mashburn Jr.	Calhoun	0000Z730	Final petition for a writ of certiorari denied by the United States Supreme Court on May 13, 2024. There is no legal impediment against Mashburn's execution.
Harvey Lee Windsor	St. Clair	0000Z498	Final petition for a writ of certiorari denied by the United States Supreme Court on October 7, 2024. There is no legal impediment against Windsor's execution.
Michael David Carruth	Russell	0000Z700	Final petition for a writ of certiorari denied by the United States Supreme Court on October 7, 2024. There is no legal impediment against Carruth's execution.
Donald E. Deardorff	Baldwin	0000Z681	Final petition for a writ of certiorari denied by the United States Supreme Court on March 31, 2025. There is no legal impediment against Deardorff's execution.
Jeffery Day Rieber	Madison	0000Z540	Final petition for a writ of certiorari denied by the United States Supreme Court on June 30, 2025. There is no legal impediment against Rieber's execution.
Ulysses Charles Sneed	Morgan	0000Z590	Final petition for a writ of certiorari denied by the United States Supreme Court on June 30, 2025. There is no legal impediment against Sneed's execution.
Michael Wayne Reynolds	Etowah	0000Z747	Final petition for a writ of certiorari denied by the United States Supreme Court on June 30, 2025. There is no legal impediment against Reynolds's execution.
Corey Schirod Smith	Tallapoosa	0000Z584	Final petition for a writ of certiorari denied by the United States Supreme Court on October 6, 2025. There is no legal impediment against Smith's execution.
Nicholas Bernard Acklin	Madison	0000Z648	Final petition for a writ of certiorari denied by the United States Supreme Court on October 6, 2025. There is no legal impediment against Acklin's execution.
Jimmy Davis Jr.	Calhoun	0000Z557	Final petition for a writ of certiorari denied by the United States Supreme Court on October 13, 2026. There is no legal impediment against Davis's execution.

== Arizona ==
- Exhausted their appeals: 24 (as of May 20, 2026)
- Immediately eligible for execution: 24
- Scheduled for execution: 0

Name	County	Notes
Joseph Clarence Smith Jr.	Maricopa	Final petition for a writ of certiorari denied by the United States Supreme Court on May 23, 2022. There is no legal impediment against Smith's execution.
Ronald Turney Williams	Maricopa	Final petition for a writ of certiorari denied by the United States Supreme Court on October 3, 2006. There is no legal impediment against Williams's execution.
Theodore Washington	Yuma	Final petition for a writ of certiorari denied by the United States Supreme Court on March 20, 2023. There is no legal impediment against Washington's execution.
Sean Bernard Running Eagle	Maricopa	Final petition for a writ of certiorari denied by the United States Supreme Court on April 3, 2017. There is no legal impediment against Running Eagle's execution.
Richard Harley Greenway	Pima	Final petition for a writ of certiorari denied by the United States Supreme Court on June 11, 2018. There is no legal impediment against Greenway's execution.
Michael Apelt	Pinal	Final petition for a writ of certiorari denied by the United States Supreme Court on June 17, 2019. There is no legal impediment against Apelt's execution.
Eldon Michael Schurz	Maricopa	Final petition for a writ of certiorari denied by the United States Supreme Court on October 6, 2014. There is no legal impediment against Schurz's execution.
James Lynn Styers	Maricopa	Final petition for a writ of certiorari denied by the United States Supreme Court on October 19, 2020. There is no legal impediment against Styers's execution.
Roger Mark Scott	Maricopa	Final petition for a writ of certiorari denied by the United States Supreme Court on October 7, 2013. There is no legal impediment against Scott's execution.
Roger Wayne Murray	Mohave	Final petition for a writ of certiorari denied by the United States Supreme Court on October 29, 2018. There is no legal impediment against Murray's execution.
Robert Lee Walden Jr.	Pima	Final petition for a writ of certiorari denied by the United States Supreme Court on January 10, 2022. There is no legal impediment against Walden's execution.
David Gulbrandson	Maricopa	Final petition for a writ of certiorari denied by the United States Supreme Court on June 16, 2014. There is no legal impediment against Gulbrandson's execution.
Darrell Eston Lee	La Paz	Final petition for a writ of certiorari denied by the United States Supreme Court on June 23, 2025. There is no legal impediment against Lee's execution.
James Erin McKinney	Maricopa	Final petition for a writ of certiorari denied by the United States Supreme Court on March 30, 2020. The Ninth Circuit Court of Appeals previously remanded the case to the Arizona Supreme Court for reconsideration, which reweighed the aggravators and mitigators and upheld McKinney's sentence. This has been upheld by the United States Supreme Court. There is no legal impediment against McKinney's execution.
Charles Michael Hedlund	Maricopa	Final petition for a writ of certiorari denied by the United States Supreme Court on March 2, 2020. The procedural history is similar to McKinney's case. There is no legal impediment against Hedlund's execution.
Chad Alan Lee	Maricopa	Final petition for a writ of certiorari denied by the United States Supreme Court on June 2, 2025. There is no legal impediment against Lee's execution.
Christopher John Spreitz	Pima	Final petition for a writ of certiorari denied by the United States Supreme Court on October 20, 2025. The procedural history is similar to McKinney's case. There is no legal impediment against Spreitz's execution.
Eric Owen Mann	Pima	Final petition for a writ of certiorari denied by the United States Supreme Court on February 27, 2017. There is no legal impediment against Mann's execution.
Pete Carl Rogovich	Maricopa	Final petition for a writ of certiorari denied by the United States Supreme Court on October 7, 2013. There is no legal impediment against Rogovich's execution.
George Russell Kayer Sr.	Yavapai	Final petition for a writ of certiorari denied by the United States Supreme Court on March 21, 2022. There is no legal impediment against Kayer's execution.
Ernesto Salgado Martinez III	Maricopa	Final petition for a writ of certiorari denied by the United States Supreme Court on January 9, 2023. An execution date has been requested by Attorney General Kris Mayes' office.
Robert Allen Poyson	Mohave	Final petition for a writ of certiorari denied by the United States Supreme Court on May 19, 2014. There is no legal impediment against Poyson's execution.
John Edward Sansing	Maricopa	Final petition for a writ of certiorari denied by the United States Supreme Court on February 27, 2023. There is no legal impediment against Sansing's execution.
Thomas Michael Riley	Maricopa	Riley failed to pursue timely federal habeas relief under AEDPA. There is no legal impediment against Riley's execution.

== Arkansas ==
- Exhausted their appeals: 12 (as of May 4, 2026)
- Immediately eligible for execution: 9
- Scheduled for execution: 0

Name	County	Notes
Don William Davis	Benton	Final petition for a writ of certiorari denied by the United States Supreme Court on February 19, 2008. There is no legal impediment against Davis's execution.
Jack Gordon Greene	Johnson	Final petition for a writ of certiorari denied by the United States Supreme Court on May 1, 2017. Greene's execution is stayed.
Ray Dansby	Union	Final petition for a writ of certiorari denied by the United States Supreme Court on June 12, 2023. There is no legal impediment against Dansby's execution.
Terrick Terrell Nooner	Pulaski	Final petition for a writ of certiorari denied by the United States Supreme Court on October 7, 2013. Currently deemed incompetent to be executed.
Andrew Sasser	Miller	Final petition for a writ of certiorari denied by the United States Supreme Court on May 23, 2022. There is no legal impediment against Sasser's execution.
Stacey Eugene Johnson	Sevier	Final petition for a writ of certiorari denied by the United States Supreme Court on February 23, 2009. Johnson's execution is currently stayed.
Roderick Leshun Rankin	Jefferson	Final petition for a writ of certiorari denied by the United States Supreme Court on May 4, 2026. There is no legal impediment against Rankin's execution.
Karl Douglas Roberts	Polk	Final petition for a writ of certiorari denied by the United States Supreme Court on October 6, 2025. There is no legal impediment against Roberts's execution.
Justin Anderson	Lafayette	Final petition for a writ of certiorari denied by the United States Supreme Court on October 5, 2020. There is no legal impediment against Anderson's execution.
Mickey David Thomas	Sevier	Final petition for a writ of certiorari denied by the United States Supreme Court on November 22, 2021. There is no legal impediment against Thomas's execution.
Thomas Leo Springs	Sebastian	Final petition for a writ of certiorari denied by the United States Supreme Court on November 4, 2024. There is no legal impediment against Springs's execution.
Zachariah Scott Marcyniuk	Washington	Final petition for a writ of certiorari denied by the United States Supreme Court on June 12, 2023. There is no legal impediment against Marcyniuk's execution.

== California ==
- Exhausted their appeals: 47 (as of November 9, 2026)
- Immediately eligible for execution: 0
- Scheduled for execution: 0

NOTE: There is currently a moratorium on all California executions imposed by Governor Gavin Newsom.

Name	County	Notes
Charles Arnett Stevens	Alameda	Final petition for a writ of certiorari denied by the United States Supreme Court on January 9, 2023. There is no legal impediment against Stevens's execution.
Lee Max Barnett	Butte	Final petition for a writ of certiorari denied by the United States Supreme Court on October 2, 2006. There is no legal impediment against Barnett's execution.
Raymond Anthony Lewis	Fresno	Final petition for a writ of certiorari denied by the United States Supreme Court on May 5, 2025. There is no legal impediment against Lewis's execution.
Rodney Berryman Sr.	Kern	Final petition for a writ of certiorari denied by the United States Supreme Court on June 3, 2013. There is no legal impediment against Berryman's execution.
Teddy Brian Sanchez	Kern	Final petition for a writ of certiorari denied by the United States Supreme Court on October 17, 2022. There is no legal impediment against Sanchez's execution.
Richard Galvan Montiel	Kern	Final petition for a writ of certiorari denied by the United States Supreme Court on April 24, 2023. There is no legal impediment against Montiel's execution.
Steven David Catlin	Kern	Final petition for a writ of certiorari denied by the United States Supreme Court on October 20, 2025. There is no legal impediment against Catlin's execution.
Mitchell Carlton Sims	Los Angeles	Final petition for a writ of certiorari denied by the United States Supreme Court on October 2, 2006. There is no legal impediment against Sims's execution.
Scott Lynn Pinholster	Los Angeles	State of California's petition for a writ of certiorari was granted by the United States Supreme Court on April 4, 2011. There is no legal impediment against Pinholster's execution.
Ricky Lee Earp	Los Angeles	Final petition for a writ of certiorari denied by the United States Supreme Court on June 6, 2011. There is no legal impediment against Earp's execution.
Tiequon Aundray Cox	Los Angeles	Final petition for a writ of certiorari denied by the United States Supreme Court on October 3, 2011. There is no legal impediment against Cox's execution.
Albert Cunningham	Los Angeles	Final petition for a writ of certiorari denied by the United States Supreme Court on October 7, 2013. There is no legal impediment against Cunningham's execution.
Charles Edward Moore	Los Angeles	Final petition for a writ of certiorari denied by the United States Supreme Court on April 27, 2015. There is no legal impediment against Moore's execution.
Raynard Paul Cummings	Los Angeles	Final petition for a writ of certiorari denied by the United States Supreme Court on January 9, 2017. There is no legal impediment against Cummings's execution.
Ricardo Rene Sanders	Los Angeles	Final petition for a writ of certiorari denied by the United States Supreme Court on January 7, 2019. There is no legal impediment against Sanders's execution.
Steven Livaditis	Los Angeles	Final petition for a writ of certiorari denied by the United States Supreme Court on October 5, 2020. There is no legal impediment against Livaditis's execution.
Hooman Ashkan Panah	Los Angeles	Final petition for a writ of certiorari denied by the United States Supreme Court on October 5, 2020. There is no legal impediment against Panah's execution.
William Kirkpatrick Jr.	Los Angeles	Final petition for a writ of certiorari denied by the United States Supreme Court on October 13, 2020. There is no legal impediment against Kirkpatrick's execution.
Dean Phillip Carter	Los Angeles and San Diego	Final petition for a writ of certiorari denied by the United States Supreme Court on February 22, 2021. There is no legal impediment against Carter's execution.
Deondre Arthur Staten	Los Angeles	Final petition for a writ of certiorari denied by the United States Supreme Court on March 1, 2021. There is no legal impediment against Staten's execution.
Ernest DeWayne Jones	Los Angeles	Final petition for a writ of certiorari denied by the United States Supreme Court on October 3, 2022. There is no legal impediment against Jones's execution.
Lester Ochoa	Los Angeles	Final petition for a writ of certiorari denied by the United States Supreme Court on October 3, 2022. There is no legal impediment against Ochoa's execution.
Craig Anthony Ross	Los Angeles	Final petition for a writ of certiorari denied by the United States Supreme Court on October 31, 2022. There is no legal impediment against Ross's execution.
Reno (aka Harold Ray Memro)	Los Angeles	Final petition for a writ of certiorari denied by the United States Supreme Court on October 2, 2023. There is no legal impediment against Reno's execution.
Sergio Ochoa	Los Angeles	Final petition for a writ of certiorari denied by the United States Supreme Court on November 6, 2023. There is no legal impediment against Ochoa's execution.
Maureen McDermott	Los Angeles	Final petition for a writ of certiorari denied by the United States Supreme Court on November 4, 2024. There is no legal impediment against McDermott's execution.
Tauno Waidla	Los Angeles	Final petition for a writ of certiorari denied by the United States Supreme Court on November 9, 2026. There is no legal impediment against Waidla's execution.
Douglas Scott Mickey	Placer	Final petition for a writ of certiorari denied by the United States Supreme Court on October 11, 2011. There is no legal impediment against Mickey's execution.
David Allen Rundle	Placer	Final petition for a writ of certiorari denied by the United States Supreme Court on November 23, 2020. There is no legal impediment against Rundle's execution.
William Charles Payton	Orange	Final petition for a writ of certiorari denied by the United States Supreme Court on October 9, 2012. There is no legal impediment against Payton's execution.
Richard Delmer Boyer	Orange	Final petition for a writ of certiorari denied by the United States Supreme Court on May 2, 2016. There is no legal impediment against Boyer's execution.
John Louis Visciotti	Orange	Final petition for a writ of certiorari denied by the United States Supreme Court on April 16, 2018. There is no legal impediment against Visciotti's execution.
Rodney Gene Beeler	Orange	Final petition for a writ of certiorari denied by the United States Supreme Court on October 5, 2026. There is no legal impediment against Beeler's execution.
Albert Greenwood Brown Jr.	Riverside	Final petition for a writ of certiorari denied by the United States Supreme Court on October 6, 2008. There is no legal impediment against Brown's execution.
Ronald Lee Deere	Riverside	Final petition for a writ of certiorari denied by the United States Supreme Court on October 6, 2014. There is no legal impediment against Deere's execution.
Gregory Spiros Demetrulias	Riverside	Final petition for a writ of certiorari denied by the United States Supreme Court on October 3, 2022. There is no legal impediment against Demetrulius's execution.
Joseph William Hart	Riverside	Final petition for a writ of certiorari denied by the United States Supreme Court on March 10, 2025. There is no legal impediment against Hart's execution.
Kevin Cooper	San Bernardino	Final petition for a writ of certiorari denied by the United States Supreme Court on November 30, 2009. There is no legal impediment against Cooper's execution.
Hector Juan Ayala	San Diego	The United States Supreme Court remanded the case to the Ninth Circuit Court of Appeals on June 18, 2015, and on November 2, 2016 it upheld the sentence. There is no legal impediment against Ayala's execution.
Robert Jurado	San Diego	Final petition for a writ of certiorari denied by the United States Supreme Court on April 25, 2022. There is no legal impediment against Jurado's execution.
Jamie Hoyos	San Diego	Final petition for a writ of certiorari denied by the United States Supreme Court on April 24, 2023. There is no legal impediment against Hoyos's execution.
Michael Angelo Morales	San Joaquin	Final petition for a writ of certiorari denied by the United States Supreme Court on October 11, 2005. There is no legal impediment against Morales's execution.
Robert Green Fairbank Jr.	San Mateo	Final petition for a writ of certiorari denied by the United States Supreme Court on March 19, 2012. There is no legal impediment against Fairbank's execution.
Guy Kevin Rowland	San Mateo	Final petition for a writ of certiorari denied by the United States Supreme Court on October 9, 2018. There is no legal impediment against Rowland's execution.
Conrad Zapien	Santa Barbara	Final petition for a writ of certiorari denied by the United States Supreme Court on October 2, 2017. There is no legal impediment against Zapien's execution.
Tracy Dearl Cain	Ventura	Final petition for a writ of certiorari denied by the United States Supreme Court on November 5, 2018. There is no legal impediment against Cain's execution.
Curtis Lynn Fauber	Ventura	Final petition for a writ of certiorari denied by the United States Supreme Court on June 5, 2023. There is no legal impediment against Fauber's execution.

== Florida ==
- Exhausted their appeals: 97 (as of November 19, 2026)
- Immediately eligible for execution: 96
- Scheduled for execution: 2

Name	County	Offense Date (Note: The offense date is the date on which the crime that led to a death sentence was committed by the offender. If an offender received multiple death sentences for crimes that occurred on different dates, the earliest offense date is used.)	Notes
Paul Glen Everett	Bay	11/02/2001	Final petition for a writ of certiorari denied by the United States Supreme Court on January 11, 2016. There is no legal impediment against Everett's execution.
James Franklin Rose	Broward	10/22/1976	Rose failed to pursue timely federal habeas relief under AEDPA. There is no legal impediment against Rose's execution.
Albert Richard Holland Jr.	Broward	07/29/1990	Final petition for a writ of certiorari denied by the United States Supreme Court on October 3, 2011. There is no legal impediment against Holland's execution.
Robert Anthony Consalvo Jr.	Broward	09/27/1991	Final petition for a writ of certiorari denied by the United States Supreme Court on October 1, 2012. There is no legal impediment against Consalvo's execution.
Omar Blanco	Broward	01/14/1982	Final petition for a writ of certiorari denied by the United States Supreme Court on April 15, 2013. There is no legal impediment against Blanco's execution.
Dana Lewis Williamson	Broward	11/04/1988	Final petition for a writ of certiorari denied by the United States Supreme Court on April 15, 2016. There is no legal impediment against Williamson's execution.
Lucious Boyd	Broward	12/05/1998	Final petition for a writ of certiorari denied by the United States Supreme Court on June 23, 2025. There is no legal impediment against Boyd's execution.
Jack Rilea Sliney	Charlotte	06/18/1992	Failed to file a final petition for a writ of certiorari to the United States Supreme Court. The Eleventh Circuit Court of Appeals denied habeas relief on December 21, 2010. There is no legal impediment against Sliney's execution.
Floyd William Damren	Clay	05/01/1994	Final petition for a writ of certiorari denied by the United States Supreme Court on January 23, 2017. There is no legal impediment against Damren's execution.
William Earl Sweet	Duval	06/27/1990	Final petition for a writ of certiorari denied by the United States Supreme Court on April 30, 2007. There is no legal impediment against Sweet's execution.
John Dwayne Freeman	Duval	11/11/1986	Final petition for a writ of certiorari denied by the United States Supreme Court on January 12, 2009. There is no legal impediment against Freeman's execution.
Grover Burnett Reed	Duval	02/27/1986	Final petition for a writ of certiorari denied by the United States Supreme Court on October 4, 2010. There is no legal impediment against Reed's execution.
Pressley Bernard Alston	Duval	01/22/1995	Final petition for a writ of certiorari denied by the United States Supreme Court on December 13, 2010. There is no legal impediment against Alston's execution.
John Loveman Reese	Duval	01/28/1992	Final petition for a writ of certiorari denied by the United States Supreme Court on October 1, 2012. There is no legal impediment against Reese's execution.
Jason Demetrius Stephens	Duval	06/02/1997	Final petition for a writ of certiorari denied by the United States Supreme Court on October 15, 2012. There is no legal impediment against Stephens's execution.
Gregory Alan Kokal	Duval	09/29/1983	Final petition for a writ of certiorari denied by the United States Supreme Court on January 11, 2016. There is no legal impediment against Kokal's execution.
Etheria Verdell Jackson	Duval	12/03/1985	Final petition for a writ of certiorari denied by the United States Supreme Court on April 18, 2016. There is no legal impediment against Jackson's execution.
Ronald Wayne Clark Jr.	Duval	01/12/1990	Final petition for a writ of certiorari denied by the United States Supreme Court on February 21, 2017. There is no legal impediment against Clark's execution.
William Greg Thomas	Duval	09/12/1991	Final petition for a writ of certiorari denied by the United States Supreme Court on January 10, 2022. There is no legal impediment against Thomas's execution.
David Miller Jr.	Duval	03/06/1997	Final petition for a writ of certiorari denied by the United States Supreme Court on April 17, 2023. There is no legal impediment against Miller's execution.
Steven Richard Taylor	Duval	09/15/1990	Final petition for a writ of certiorari denied by the United States Supreme Court on January 8, 2024. There is no legal impediment against Taylor's execution.
Thomas James Moore	Duval	01/21/1993	Final petition for a writ of certiorari denied by the United States Supreme Court on October 7, 2024. There is no legal impediment against Moore's execution.
Anthony Mungin	Duval	09/16/1990	Final petition for a writ of certiorari denied by the United States Supreme Court on October 7, 2024. There is no legal impediment against Mungin's execution.
Kenneth Blair Hartley	Duval	04/22/1991	Final petition for a writ of certiorari denied by the United States Supreme Court on October 6, 2025. There is no legal impediment against Hartley's execution.
Antonio Lebaron Melton	Escambia	01/23/1991	Final petition for a writ of certiorari denied by the United States Supreme Court on October 13, 2015. There is no legal impediment against Melton's execution.
Richard Earl Shere Jr.	Hernando	12/25/1987	Failed to file a final petition for a writ of certiorari to the United States Supreme Court. The Eleventh Circuit Court of Appeals denied habeas relief on August 7, 2008. There is no legal impediment against Shere's execution.
Alfred Lewis Fennie	Hernando	09/08/1991	Final petition for a writ of certiorari denied by the United States Supreme Court on April 2, 2012. There is no legal impediment against Fennie's execution.
Kenneth Allen Stewart	Hillsborough	12/06/1984	Failed to file a final petition for a writ of certiorari to the United States Supreme Court. The Eleventh Circuit Court of Appeals denied habeas relief on January 31, 2007. There is no legal impediment against Stewart's execution.
Richard Harold Anderson	Hillsborough	05/07/1987	Final petition for a writ of certiorari denied by the United States Supreme Court on February 20, 2007. There is no legal impediment against Anderson's execution.
George Michael Hodges	Hillsborough	01/08/1987	Final petition for a writ of certiorari denied by the United States Supreme Court on October 6, 2008. There is no legal impediment against Hodges's execution.
Paul Alfred Brown	Hillsborough	03/20/1986	Final petition for a writ of certiorari denied by the United States Supreme Court on January 24, 2011. There is no legal impediment against Brown's execution.
Perry Alexander Taylor	Hillsborough	03/20/1986	Final petition for a writ of certiorari denied by the United States Supreme Court on May 18, 2015. There is no legal impediment against Taylor's execution.
Ray Lamar Johnston	Hillsborough	08/19/1997	Final petition for a writ of certiorari denied by the United States Supreme Court on November 2, 2020. There is no legal impediment against Johnson's execution.
Willie Seth Crain Jr.	Hillsborough	09/10/1998	Final petition for a writ of certiorari denied by the United States Supreme Court on October 10, 2023. Scheduled to be executed on December 10, 2026.
Charles Grover Brant	Hillsborough	07/01/2004	Final petition for a writ of certiorari denied by the United States Supreme Court on November 4, 2024. There is no legal impediment against Brant's execution.
Steven Lorenzo	Hillsborough	12/19/2003	Lorenzo waived all non-mandatory appeals. There is no legal impediment against Lorenzo's execution.
Fred Anderson Jr.	Lake	03/20/1999	Final petition for a writ of certiorari denied by the United States Supreme Court on February 23, 2015. There is no legal impediment against Anderson's execution.
Joshua David Nelson	Lee	03/10/1995	Final petition for a writ of certiorari denied by the United States Supreme Court on October 10, 2017. There is no legal impediment against Nelson's execution.
Anton Joseph Krawczuk	Lee	09/13/1990	Final petition for a writ of certiorari denied by the United States Supreme Court on October 1, 2018. There is no legal impediment against Krawczuk's execution.
Kevin Donald Foster	Lee	04/30/1996	Final petition for a writ of certiorari denied by the United States Supreme Court on November 24, 2025. There is no legal impediment against Foster's execution.
Harry Jones Jr.	Leon	06/01/1991	Final petition for a writ of certiorari denied by the United States Supreme Court on June 12, 2017. There is no legal impediment against Jones's execution.
Daniel Burns Jr.	Manatee	08/18/1987	Final petition for a writ of certiorari denied by the United States Supreme Court on April 28, 2014. There is no legal impediment against Burns's execution.
Ian Deco Lightbourne	Marion	01/16/1981	Final petition for a writ of certiorari denied by the United States Supreme Court on April 28, 1988. There is no legal impediment against Lightbourne's execution.
Anthony John Ponticelli	Marion	11/27/1987	Final petition for a writ of certiorari denied by the United States Supreme Court on June 24, 2013. There is no legal impediment against Ponticelli's execution.
Lenard James Philmore	Martin	11/14/1997	Final petition for a writ of certiorari denied by the United States Supreme Court on March 22, 2010. There is no legal impediment against Philmore's execution.
Matthew Ted Marshall	Martin	11/01/1988	Final petition for a writ of certiorari denied by the United States Supreme Court on March 28, 2011. There is no legal impediment against Marshall's execution.
Anthony Antonio Spann	Martin	11/14/1997	Failed to file a timely appeal to the Eleventh Circuit Court of Appeals. The federal district court denied habeas relief on April 16, 2013. There is no legal impediment against Spann's execution.
Ronnie Johnson	Miami-Dade	03/11/1989	Final petition for a writ of certiorari denied by the United States Supreme Court on June 10, 2008. There is no legal impediment against Johnson's execution.
William Lee Thompson	Miami-Dade	03/30/1976	Final petition for a writ of certiorari denied by the United States Supreme Court on March 9, 2009. Thompson's execution is stayed pending a competency review.
Frederick Wooden Cummings-El	Miami-Dade	09/16/1991	Final petition for a writ of certiorari denied by the United States Supreme Court on October 4, 2010. There is no legal impediment against Cummings-El's execution.
Leonardo Franqui	Miami-Dade	12/06/1991	Final petition for a writ of certiorari denied by the United States Supreme Court on January 8, 2011. There is no legal impediment against Franqui's execution.
Pablo San Martin	Miami-Dade	12/06/1991	Final petition for a writ of certiorari denied by the United States Supreme Court on October 3, 2011. There is no legal impediment against San Martin's execution.
Ricardo Maldonado Gonzalez	Miami-Dade	01/03/1992	Final petition for a writ of certiorari denied by the United States Supreme Court on October 31, 2011. Scheduled to be executed on December 1, 2026.
Michael Allen Griffin	Miami-Dade	04/27/1990	Final petition for a writ of certiorari denied by the United States Supreme Court on May 21, 2012. There is no legal impediment against Griffin's execution.
Marbel Mendoza	Miami-Dade	03/17/1992	Final petition for a writ of certiorari denied by the United States Supreme Court on March 30, 2015. There is no legal impediment against Mendoza's execution.
Manuel Antonio Rodriguez	Miami-Dade	12/04/1984	Final petition for a writ of certiorari denied by the United States Supreme Court on March 30, 2015. There is no legal impediment against Rodriguez's execution.
Juan David Rodriguez	Miami-Dade	05/13/1988	Final petition for a writ of certiorari denied by the United States Supreme Court on March 8, 2021. There is no legal impediment against Rodriguez's execution.
Harry Franklin Phillips	Miami-Dade	08/31/1982	Final petition for a writ of certiorari denied by the United States Supreme Court on June 5, 2023. There is no legal impediment against Phillips's execution.
Daniel Jon Peterka	Okaloosa	07/12/1989	Final petition for a writ of certiorari denied by the United States Supreme Court on April 5, 2010. There is no legal impediment against Peterka's execution.
William Thomas Zeigler Jr.	Orange	12/24/1975	Final petition for a writ of certiorari denied by the United States Supreme Court on October 4, 2004. There is no legal impediment against Zeigler's execution.
Sonny Ray Jeffries	Orange	04/14/1999	Jeffries waived all non-mandatory appeals. There is no legal impediment against Jeffries's execution.
Ken Eldon Lott	Orange	03/27/1994	Failed to file a final petition for a writ of certiorari to the United States Supreme Court. The Eleventh Circuit Court of Appeals denied habeas relief on January 25, 2010. There is no legal impediment against Lott's execution.
Michael Lee Robinson	Orange	07/24/1994	Final petition for a writ of certiorari denied by the United States Supreme Court on October 4, 2010. There is no legal impediment against Robinson's execution.
Henry Perry Sireci	Orange	12/03/1975	Final petition for a writ of certiorari denied by the United States Supreme Court on October 3, 2011. There is no legal impediment against Sireci's execution.
Harold Lee Harvey Jr.	Okeechobee	02/23/1985	Final petition for a writ of certiorari denied by the United States Supreme Court on November 14, 2011. There is no legal impediment against Harvey's execution.
Scott Mansfield	Osceola	10/15/1995	Final petition for a writ of certiorari denied by the United States Supreme Court on January 7, 2013. There is no legal impediment against Mansfield's execution.
Paul William Scott	Palm Beach	12/04/1978	Final petition for a writ of certiorari denied by the United States Supreme Court on October 1, 1990. There is no legal impediment against Scott's execution.
Norberto Pietri	Palm Beach	08/22/1988	Final petition for a writ of certiorari denied by the United States Supreme Court on February 21, 2012. There is no legal impediment against Pietri's execution.
Ronald Alan Knight	Palm Beach	07/08/1993	Final petition for a writ of certiorari denied by the United States Supreme Court on April 5, 2021. There is no legal impediment against Knight's execution.
Carl Puiatti	Pasco	08/16/1983	Final petition for a writ of certiorari denied by the United States Supreme Court on June 27, 2011. There is no legal impediment against Puiatti's execution.
Alvin Leroy Morton	Pasco	01/26/1992	Final petition for a writ of certiorari denied by the United States Supreme Court on April 1, 2013. There is no legal impediment against Morton's execution.
Jeffrey Lee Atwater	Pinellas	08/11/1989	Final petition for a writ of certiorari denied by the United States Supreme Court on January 8, 2007. There is no legal impediment against Atwater's execution.
Robert Roy Gordon	Pinellas	01/25/1994	Failed to file a final petition for a writ of certiorari to the United States Supreme Court. The Eleventh Circuit Court of Appeals denied habeas relief on March 1, 2007. There is no legal impediment against Gordon's execution.
Jeffrey Allen Muehleman	Pinellas	05/05/1983	Muehleman waived all non-mandatory appeals. There is no legal impediment against Muehleman's execution.
Milo Andrew Rose	Pinellas	10/18/1982	Final petition for a writ of certiorari denied by the United States Supreme Court on October 3, 2011. There is no legal impediment against Rose's execution.
Meryl Stanley McDonald	Pinellas	01/25/1994	Final petition for a writ of certiorari denied by the United States Supreme Court on February 27, 2012. There is no legal impediment against McDonald's execution.
Richard Wallace Rhodes Jr.	Pinellas	02/29/1984	Final petition for a writ of certiorari denied by the United States Supreme Court on October 1, 2012. There is no legal impediment against Rhodes's execution.
Jason Dirk Walton	Pinellas	06/18/1982	Final petition for a writ of certiorari denied by the United States Supreme Court on October 1, 2012. There is no legal impediment against Walton's execution.
Kenneth Louis Dessaure Jr.	Pinellas	02/09/1999	Final petition for a writ of certiorari denied by the United States Supreme Court on April 15, 2013. There is no legal impediment against Dessaure's execution.
James Milton Dailey	Pinellas	05/05/1985	Final petition for a writ of certiorari denied by the United States Supreme Court on April 29, 2013. There is no legal impediment against Dailey's execution.
Robert Dwayne Morris	Polk	09/01/1994	Failed to file a final petition for a writ of certiorari to the United States Supreme Court. The Eleventh Circuit Court of Appeals denied habeas relief on April 20, 2012. There is no legal impediment against Morris's execution.
Micah Louis Nelson	Polk	11/16/1997	Final petition for a writ of certiorari denied by the United States Supreme Court on March 18, 2013. There is no legal impediment against Nelson's execution.
Tavares Jerrod Wright	Polk	04/21/2000	Final petition for a writ of certiorari denied by the United States Supreme Court on October 3, 2022. There is no legal impediment against Wright's execution.
Randall Scott Jones	Putnam	07/27/1987	Final petition for a writ of certiorari denied by the United States Supreme Court on November 14, 2011. There is no legal impediment against Jones's execution.
Joel Dale Wright	Putnam	02/06/1983	Final petition for a writ of certiorari denied by the United States Supreme Court on June 1, 2015. There is no legal impediment against Wright's execution.
John Christopher Marquard	St. Johns	06/20/1991	Final petition for a writ of certiorari denied by the United States Supreme Court on June 5, 2006. There is no legal impediment against Marquard's execution.
Ernest Whitfield	Sarasota	06/19/1995	Failed to file a final petition for a writ of certiorari to the United States Supreme Court. The Eleventh Circuit Court of Appeals denied habeas relief on March 24, 2014. There is no legal impediment against Whitfield's execution.
Emanuel Johnson Sr.	Sarasota	09/22/1988	Final petition for a writ of certiorari denied by the United States Supreme Court on March 30, 2026. There is no legal impediment against Johnson's execution.
Gary Lawrence	Santa Rosa	07/28/1994	Conviction and sentence affirmed by the United States Supreme Court on March 26, 2007. There is no legal impediment against Lawrence's execution.
Bruce Douglas Pace	Santa Rosa	11/04/1988	Final petition for a writ of certiorari denied by the United States Supreme Court on October 5, 2009. There is no legal impediment against Pace's execution.
Jeremiah Martel Rodgers	Santa Rosa	05/07/1998	Rodgers waived all non-mandatory appeals. There is no legal impediment against Rodgers's execution.
Andrew Richard Allred	Seminole	09/24/2007	Final petition for a writ of certiorari denied by the United States Supreme Court on October 15, 2024. There is no legal impediment against Allred's execution.
Kenneth Darcell Quince	Volusia	12/28/1979	Final petition for a writ of certiorari denied by the United States Supreme Court on November 1, 2004. There is no legal impediment against Quince's execution.
James Eugene Hunter	Volusia	09/17/1992	Final petition for a writ of certiorari denied by the United States Supreme Court on October 3, 2005. There is no legal impediment against Hunter's execution.
Konstantinos X. Fotopoulos	Volusia	10/20/1989	Final petition for a writ of certiorari denied by the United States Supreme Court on October 6, 2008. There is no legal impediment against Fotopoulos's execution.
Bobby Allen Raleigh	Volusia	06/05/1994	Final petition for a writ of certiorari denied by the United States Supreme Court on May 22, 2017. There is no legal impediment against Raleigh's execution.
Ernest Donald Suggs	Walton	08/06/1990	Final petition for a writ of certiorari denied by the United States Supreme Court on March 28, 2011. There is no legal impediment against Suggs's execution.

== Georgia ==
- Exhausted their appeals: 14 (as of September 15, 2026)
- Immediately eligible for execution: 4
- Scheduled for execution: 0

Name	County	Notes
Virgil Delano Presnell	Cobb	Final petition for a writ of certiorari denied by the United States Supreme Court on October 4, 2021. Due to a COVID-19 era agreement and subsequent litigation, Presnell's execution remains on hold.
Lyndon Fitzgerald Pace	Fulton	Final petition for a writ of certiorari denied by the United States Supreme Court on May 13, 2024. There is no legal impediment against Pace's execution.
Billy Daniel Raulerson Jr.	Ware	Final petition for a writ of certiorari denied by the United States Supreme Court on March 30, 2020. Due to a COVID-19 era agreement and subsequent litigation, Raulerson's execution remains on hold.
Frederick Ramone Whatley	Spalding	Final petition for a writ of certiorari denied by the United States Supreme Court on April 19, 2021. Due to a COVID-19 era agreement and subsequent litigation, Whatley's execution remains on hold.
James Allyson Lee	Charlton	Final petition for a writ of certiorari denied by the United States Supreme Court on December 6, 2021. Due to a COVID-19 era agreement and subsequent litigation, Lee's execution remains on hold.
Michael Wade Nance	Gwinnett	Final petition for a writ of certiorari denied by the United States Supreme Court on March 23, 2020. Due to a COVID-19 era agreement and subsequent litigation, Nance's execution remains on hold.
Leon Tollette	Muscogee	Final petition for a writ of certiorari denied by the United States Supreme Court on April 26, 2021. Due to a COVID-19 era agreement and subsequent litigation, Tollette's execution remains on hold.
David Scott Franks	Hall	Final petition for a writ of certiorari denied by the United States Supreme Court on October 4, 2021. Due to a COVID-19 era agreement and subsequent litigation, Franks's execution remains on hold.
Warren King	Appling	Final petition for a writ of certiorari denied by the United States Supreme Court on July 2, 2024. There is no legal impediment against King's execution.
John Anthony Esposito	Morgan	Final petition for a writ of certiorari denied by the United States Supreme Court on June 7, 2021. Due to a COVID-19 era agreement and subsequent litigation, Esposito's execution remains on hold.
Jerry Scott Heidler	Toombs	Final petition for a writ of certiorari denied by the United States Supreme Court on May 20, 2024. There is no legal impediment against Heidler's execution.
Mustafa Askia Raheem	Henry	Final petition for a writ of certiorari denied by the United States Supreme Court on March 7, 2022. Due to a COVID-19 era agreement and subsequent litigation, Raheem's execution remains on hold.
Darryl Scott Stinski	Chatham	Final petition for a writ of certiorari denied by the United States Supreme Court on December 16, 2024. There is no legal impediment against Stinski's execution.
Stacey Ian Humphreys	Cobb	Final petition for a writ of certiorari denied by the United States Supreme Court on October 14, 2025. Humphreys' execution is currently stayed.

== Idaho ==
- Exhausted their appeals: 2 (as of December 26, 2024)
- Immediately eligible for execution: 1
- Scheduled for execution: 0

Name	County	Notes
Thomas Eugene Creech	Ada	Final petition for a writ of certiorari denied by the United States Supreme Court on October 10, 2023. There is no legal impediment against Creech's execution.
Gerald Ross Pizzuto Jr.	Idaho	Final petition for a writ of certiorari denied by the United States Supreme Court on November 2, 2020. Pizzuto's execution is currently stayed.

== Indiana ==
- Exhausted their appeals: 1 (as of November 5, 2026)
- Immediately eligible for execution: 0
- Scheduled for execution: 0

Name	County	Notes
Michael Dean Overstreet	Johnson	Final petition for a writ of certiorari denied by the United States Supreme Court on May 28, 2013. Currently deemed incompetent to be executed.

== Kansas ==
- Exhausted their appeals: 0 (as of December 26, 2024)
- Immediately eligible for execution: 0
- Scheduled for execution: 0

== Kentucky ==
- Exhausted their appeals: 15 (as of January 26, 2026)
- Immediately eligible for execution: 14
- Scheduled for execution: 0

NOTE: *All Kentucky executions are currently enjoined by the Franklin County Circuit Court, a ruling that was confirmed by the Kentucky Supreme Court in September 2026. The ruling from the Supreme Court also confirmed the Governor retains sole authority and discretion concerning the issuance of execution warrants and cannot be ordered to do so by any court or other official. Governer Andy Beshear indicated that several steps must be taken by the Department of Corrections to address the issues raised by the court before the state is prepared to carry out an execution.

Name	County	Notes
Karu Gene White	Breathitt	Final petition for a writ of certiorari denied by the United States Supreme Court on January 26, 2026. There is no legal impediment against White's execution.
David Eugene Matthews	Jefferson	Final petition for a writ of certiorari denied by the United States Supreme Court on October 7, 2024. There is no legal impediment against Matthews's execution.
Mitchell Willoughby	Fayette	Final petition for a writ of certiorari denied by the United States Supreme Court on June 29, 2020. There is no legal impediment against Willoughby's execution.
Brian Keith Moore	Jefferson	Final petition for a writ of certiorari denied by the United States Supreme Court on November 6, 2006. Moore's execution is currently stayed.
Victor Dewayne Taylor	Jefferson	Final petition for a writ of certiorari denied by the United States Supreme Court on April 18, 2022. There is no legal impediment against Taylor's execution.
Benny Lee Hodge	Letcher	Final petition for a writ of certiorari denied by the United States Supreme Court on January 12, 2026. There is no legal impediment against Hodge's execution.
Ronnie Lee Bowling	Laurel	Final petition for a writ of certiorari denied by the United States Supreme Court on June 18, 2018. There is no legal impediment against Bowling's execution.
Robert Carl Foley	Madison	Final petition for a writ of certiorari denied by the United States Supreme Court on January 12, 2015. There is no legal impediment against Foley's execution.
Ralph Stephens Baze Jr.	Powell	Final petition for a writ of certiorari denied by the United States Supreme Court on October 3, 2011. There is no legal impediment against Baze's execution.
Randy Haight	Garrard	Final petition for a writ of certiorari denied by the United States Supreme Court on January 8, 2024. There is no legal impediment against Haight's execution.
William Eugene Thompson	Lyon	Final petition for a writ of certiorari denied by the United States Supreme Court on April 23, 2018. There is no legal impediment against Thompson's execution.
Robert Keith Woodall	Muhlenberg	Commonwealth of Kentucky's petition for a writ of certiorari was granted by the United States Supreme Court on April 23, 2014. There is no legal impediment against Woodall's execution.
Virginia Susan Caudill	Fayette	Final petition for a writ of certiorari denied by the United States Supreme Court on January 7, 2019. There is no legal impediment against Caudill's execution.
Roger Lamont Wheeler	Jefferson	Final petition for a writ of certiorari denied by the United States Supreme Court on October 16, 2017. There is no legal impediment against Wheeler's execution.
Samuel Steven Fields	Floyd	Final petition for a writ of certiorari denied by the United States Supreme Court on June 10, 2024. There is no legal impediment against Fields's execution.

== Louisiana ==
- Exhausted their appeals: 1 (as of August 18, 2026)
- Immediately eligible for execution: 1
- Scheduled for execution: 0

Name	Parish	Notes
Todd Kelvin Wessinger	East Baton Rouge	Final petition for a writ of certiorari denied by the United States Supreme Court on March 5, 2018. There is no legal impediment against Wessinger's execution.

== Mississippi ==
- Exhausted their appeals: 2 (as of October 15, 2025)
- Immediately eligible for execution: 2
- Scheduled for execution: 0

Name	County	Notes
Robert Simon Jr.	Quitman	Final petition for a writ of certiorari denied by the United States Supreme Court on March 21, 2011. An execution date has been requested by Attorney General Lynn Fitch's office.
Willie Jerome Manning	Oktibbeha	Final petition for a writ of certiorari denied by the United States Supreme Court on March 23, 2013. An execution date has been requested by Attorney General Lynn Fitch's office.

== Missouri ==
- Exhausted their appeals: 2 (as of July 28, 2026)
- Immediately eligible for execution: 0
- Scheduled for execution: 0

Name	County	Notes
Charles Lee Mathenia	Jefferson	Final petition for a writ of certiorari denied by the United States Supreme Court on March 22, 1993. Currently deemed incompetent to be executed.
Roosevelt Pollard	Cole	Final petition for a writ of certiorari denied by the United States Supreme Court. Currently deemed incompetent to be executed.

== Montana ==
- Exhausted their appeals: 2 (as of December 26, 2024)
- Immediately eligible for execution: 0
- Scheduled for execution: 0

NOTE: All executions in Montana have been enjoined by a state district court judge.

Name	County	Notes
Ronald Allen Smith	Flathead	Final petition for a writ of certiorari denied by the United States Supreme Court on October 12, 2010. There is no legal impediment against Smith's execution.
William Jay Gollehon	Powell	Final petition for a writ of certiorari denied by the United States Supreme Court on October 3, 2011. There is no legal impediment against Gollehon's execution.

== Nebraska ==
- Exhausted their appeals: 2 (as of December 26, 2024)
- Immediately eligible for execution: 2
- Scheduled for execution: 0

Name	County	Notes
John L. Lotter	Richardson	Final petition for a writ of certiorari denied by the United States Supreme Court on January 22, 2018. There is no legal impediment against Lotter's execution.
Jose Sandoval	Madison	Sandoval failed to pursue timely federal habeas relief under AEDPA. There is no legal impediment against Sandoval's execution.

== Nevada ==
- Exhausted their appeals: 5 (as of June 8, 2026)
- Immediately eligible for execution: 4
- Scheduled for execution: 0

Name	County	Notes
Robert Ybarra Jr.	White Pine	Final petition for a writ of certiorari denied by the United States Supreme Court on May 28, 2024. Ybarra's execution is stayed.
John Bejarano	Washoe	Final petition for a writ of certiorari denied by the United States Supreme Court on June 8, 2026. There is no legal impediment against Bejarano's execution.
Sterling Mark Atkins Jr.	Clark	Final petition for a writ of certiorari denied by the United States Supreme Court on October 14, 2025. There is no legal impediment against Atkins's execution.
Donald William Sherman	Clark	Final petition for a writ of certiorari denied by the United States Supreme Court on May 19, 2025. There is no legal impediment against Sherman's execution.
Zane Michael Floyd	Clark	Final petition for a writ of certiorari denied by the United States Supreme Court on November 2, 2020. There is no legal impediment against Floyd's execution.

== North Carolina ==
- Exhausted their appeals: 25 (as of October 8, 2025)
- Immediately eligible for execution: 0
- Scheduled for execution: 0

NOTE: All North Carolina executions are currently enjoined by the Wake County Superior Court.

Name	County	Notes
Jerry Wayne Conner	Gates	Final petition for a writ of certiorari denied by the United States Supreme Court on February 27, 2006. Conner's execution is stayed.
James Adolph Campbell	Rowan	Final petition for a writ of certiorari denied by the United States Supreme Court on December 11, 2006. Campbell's execution is stayed.
James Edward Thomas	Wake	Final petition for a writ of certiorari denied by the United States Supreme Court on December 11, 2006. Thomas's execution is stayed.
Archie Lee Billings	Caswell	Final petition for a writ of certiorari denied by the United States Supreme Court on January 8, 2007. Billings's execution is stayed.
George Cale Buckner	Gaston	Final petition for a writ of certiorari denied by the United States Supreme Court on March 19, 2007. Buckner's execution is stayed.
David Clayton Lynch	Gaston	Final petition for a writ of certiorari denied by the United States Supreme Court on June 25, 2007. Lynch's execution is stayed.
Daniel Cummings Jr.	Brunswick	Final petition for a writ of certiorari denied by the United States Supreme Court on October 9, 2007. Cummings's execution is stayed.
John Davis McNeill	Cumberland	Final petition for a writ of certiorari denied by the United States Supreme Court on November 26, 2007. McNeill's execution is stayed.
Philip Edward Wilkinson	Cumberland	Final petition for a writ of certiorari denied by the United States Supreme Court on January 7, 2008. Wilkinson's execution is stayed.
Jerry Dale Hill	Harnett	Final petition for a writ of certiorari denied by the United States Supreme Court on February 19, 2008. Hill's execution is stayed.
Erroll Duke Moses	Forsyth	Final petition for a writ of certiorari denied by the United States Supreme Court on June 23, 2008. Moses's execution is stayed.
Jeffrey Karl Meyer	Cumberland	Final petition for a writ of certiorari denied by the United States Supreme Court on June 23, 2008. Meyer's execution is stayed.
Richard Eugene Cagle	Cumberland	Final petition for a writ of certiorari denied by the United States Supreme Court on December 15, 2008. Cagle's execution is stayed.
Wade Larry Cole	Camden	Final petition for a writ of certiorari denied by the United States Supreme Court on October 5, 2009. Cole's execution is stayed.
Thomas Michael Larry	Forsyth	Final petition for a writ of certiorari denied by the United States Supreme Court on October 13, 2009. Larry's execution is stayed.
Roger McKinley Blakeney	Union	Final petition for a writ of certiorari denied by the United States Supreme Court on November 2, 2009. Blakeney's execution is stayed.
Terry Alvin Hyatt	Buncombe	Final petition for a writ of certiorari denied by the United States Supreme Court on March 29, 2010. Hyatt's execution is stayed.
Henry Louis Wallace	Mecklenburg	Final petition for a writ of certiorari denied by the United States Supreme Court on May 3, 2010. Wallace's execution is stayed.
Jimmie Wayne Lawrence	Harnett	Final petition for a writ of certiorari denied by the United States Supreme Court on June 13, 2011. Lawrence's execution is stayed.
Timothy Richardson	Nash	Final petition for a writ of certiorari denied by the United States Supreme Court on October 9, 2012. Richardson's execution is stayed.
Randy Lynn Atkins	Buncombe	Final petition for a writ of certiorari denied by the United States Supreme Court on May 13, 2013. Atkins's execution is stayed.
Shan Edward Carter	New Hanover	Final petition for a writ of certiorari denied by the United States Supreme Court on June 12, 2017. Carter's execution is stayed.
Lesley Eugene Warren	Buncombe	Final petition for a writ of certiorari denied by the United States Supreme Court on February 19, 2019. Warren's execution is stayed.
John Edward Burr	Alamance	Final petition for a writ of certiorari denied by the United States Supreme Court on October 3, 2022. Burr's execution is stayed.
James Floyd Davis	Buncombe	Davis failed to pursue timely federal habeas relief under AEDPA. Davis's execution is stayed.

== Ohio ==
- Exhausted their appeals: 42 (as of November 9, 2026)
- Immediately eligible for execution: 41
- Scheduled for execution: 27

Name	County	Notes
Cleveland Ramon Jackson	Allen	Final petition for a writ of certiorari denied by the United States Supreme Court on February 19, 2013. Scheduled to be executed on June 13, 2029.
Nawaz Ahmed	Belmont	Final petition for a writ of certiorari denied by the United States Supreme Court on June 16, 2025. There is no legal impediment against Ahmed's execution.
Carl Lindsey	Brown	Final petition for a writ of certiorari denied by the United States Supreme Court on October 16, 2023. There is no legal impediment against Lindsey's execution.
Von Clark Davis	Butler	Final petition for a writ of certiorari denied by the United States Supreme Court on June 2, 2025. Scheduled to be executed on January 9, 2029.
Timothy L. Coleman	Clark	Final petition for a writ of certiorari denied by the United States Supreme Court on June 7, 2021. Scheduled to be executed on September 13, 2028.
Juan Antonio Lamar Kinley	Clark	Final petition for a writ of certiorari denied by the United States Supreme Court on November 9, 2026. There is no legal impediment against Kinley's execution.
Melvin D. Bonnell Jr.	Cuyahoga	Final petition for a writ of certiorari denied by the United States Supreme Court on December 3, 2007. Scheduled to be executed on October 18, 2029.
Percy Hutton	Cuyahoga	Final petition for a writ of certiorari denied by the United States Supreme Court on October 7, 2019. Scheduled to be executed on June 21, 2028.
Quisi Bryan	Cuyahoga	Final petition for a writ of certiorari denied by the United States Supreme Court on October 1, 2018. Scheduled to be executed on November 15, 2028.
Anthony C. Apanovitch	Cuyahoga	Final petition for a writ of certiorari denied by the United States Supreme Court on March 19, 2012. There is no legal impediment against Apanovitch's execution.
David Wayne Allen	Cuyahoga	Final petition for a writ of certiorari denied by the United States Supreme Court on October 5, 2020. There is no legal impediment against Allen's execution.
Clarence Mack	Cuyahoga	Final petition for a writ of certiorari denied by the United States Supreme Court on October 7, 2024. There is no legal impediment against Mack's execution.
Delano Hale	Cuyahoga	Final petition for a writ of certiorari denied by the United States Supreme Court on October 14, 2025. There is no legal impediment against Hale's execution.
Gerald Robert Hand	Delaware	Final petition for a writ of certiorari denied by the United States Supreme Court on April 23, 2018. Scheduled to be executed on April 18, 2029.
Warren Keith Henness	Franklin	Final petition for a writ of certiorari denied by the United States Supreme Court on April 23, 2012. Scheduled to be executed on December 15, 2027.
Kareem M. Jackson	Franklin	Final petition for a writ of certiorari denied by the United States Supreme Court on January 22, 2013. Scheduled to be executed on October 11, 2028.
John David Stumpf	Guernsey	Final petition for a writ of certiorari denied by the United States Supreme Court on January 13, 2014. Scheduled to be executed on August 18, 2027.
Jerome Henderson	Hamilton	Final petition for a writ of certiorari denied by the United States Supreme Court on October 10, 2016. Scheduled to be executed on September 18, 2029.
James Derrick O'Neal	Hamilton	Final petition for a writ of certiorari denied by the United States Supreme Court on October 6, 2014. Scheduled to be executed on August 14, 2029.
Gary Hughbanks	Hamilton	Final petition for a writ of certiorari denied by the United States Supreme Court on February 22, 2022. There is no legal impediment against Hughbanks's execution.
Walter Raglin	Hamilton	Final petition for a writ of certiorari denied by the United States Supreme Court on February 21, 2023. There is no legal impediment against Raglin's execution.
Keith LaMar	Lawrence	Final petition for a writ of certiorari denied by the United States Supreme Court on April 25, 2016. Scheduled to be executed on January 16, 2030.
Archie James Dixon	Lucas	Final petition for a writ of certiorari denied by the United States Supreme Court on October 6, 2014. Scheduled to be executed on June 16, 2027.
Timothy Lee Hoffner	Lucas	Final petition for a writ of certiorari denied by the United States Supreme Court on April 18, 2011. Scheduled to be executed on July 14, 2027.
Douglas Lamont Coley	Lucas	Final petition for a writ of certiorari denied by the United States Supreme Court on November 4, 2013. Scheduled to be executed on August 15, 2028.
Grady Brinkley	Lucas	Final petition for a writ of certiorari denied by the United States Supreme Court on May 15, 2017. There is no legal impediment against Brinkley's execution.
Robert Williams Jr.	Lucas	Final petition for a writ of certiorari denied by the United States Supreme Court on October 2, 2017. There is no legal impediment against Williams's execution.
Stanley Jalowiec	Lorain	Final petition for a writ of certiorari denied by the United States Supreme Court on October 1, 2012. There is no legal impediment against Jalowiec's execution.
Freddie McNeill Jr.	Lorain	Final petition for a writ of certiorari denied by the United States Supreme Court on March 21, 2022. There is no legal impediment against McNeill's execution.
Scott A. Group	Mahoning	Final petition for a writ of certiorari denied by the United States Supreme Court on June 25, 2018. Scheduled to be executed on February 13, 2030.
John E. Drummond	Mahoning	Final petition for a writ of certiorari denied by the United States Supreme Court on May 16, 2016. Scheduled to be executed on March 15, 2028.
John C. Stojetz	Madison	Final petition for a writ of certiorari denied by the United States Supreme Court on February 25, 2019. Scheduled to be executed on May 19, 2027.
Davel Von Tress Chinn	Montgomery	Final petition for a writ of certiorari denied by the United States Supreme Court on November 7, 2022. Scheduled to be executed on March 13, 2030.
Antonio Sanchez Franklin	Montgomery	Final petition for a writ of certiorari denied by the United States Supreme Court on April 1, 2013. Scheduled to be executed on February 15, 2029.
James Earl Trimble	Portage	Final petition for a writ of certiorari denied by the United States Supreme Court on February 24, 2014. Scheduled to be executed on March 14, 2029.
Lawrence Alfred Landrum	Ross	Final petition for a writ of certiorari denied by the United States Supreme Court on October 17, 2016. Scheduled to be executed on October 13, 2027.
Michael Dean Scott	Stark	Final petition for a writ of certiorari denied by the United States Supreme Court on March 23, 2015. There is no legal impediment against Scott's execution.
Clarence Fry Jr.	Summit	Final petition for a writ of certiorari denied by the United States Supreme Court on December 8, 2025. Scheduled to be executed on November 14, 2029.
Danny Lee Hill	Trumbull	Final petition for a writ of certiorari denied by the United States Supreme Court on June 30, 2022. Scheduled to be executed on July 18, 2029.
Sean Carter	Trumbull	Final petition for a writ of certiorari denied by the United States Supreme Court on October 7, 2019. Currently deemed incompetent to be executed.
Stanley Theodore Adams	Trumbull	Final petition for a writ of certiorari denied by the United States Supreme Court on January 17, 2017. Scheduled to be executed on February 16, 2028.
James Galen Hanna	Warren	Final petition for a writ of certiorari denied by the United States Supreme Court on October 4, 2021. Scheduled to be executed on April 19, 2028.

== Oklahoma ==
- Exhausted their appeals: 9 (as of November 19, 2026)
- Immediately eligible for execution: 6
- Scheduled for execution: 0

Name	County	Notes
James Chandler Ryder	Pittsburg	Final petition for a writ of certiorari denied by the United States Supreme Court on November 28, 2016. Currently deemed incompetent to be executed.
Wade Greely Lay	Tulsa	Final petition for a writ of certiorari denied by the United States Supreme Court on April 16, 2018. Currently deemed incompetent to be executed.
Ricky Ray Malone	Cotton	Final petition for a writ of certiorari denied by the United States Supreme Court on October 7, 2019. Currently deemed incompetent to be executed.
Clarence Rozell Goode Jr.	Tulsa	Final petition for a writ of certiorari denied by the United States Supreme Court on February 24, 2020. An execution date has been requested by Attorney General Gentner Drummond's office.
Alfred Brian Mitchell	Oklahoma	Final petition for a writ of certiorari denied by the United States Supreme Court on October 5, 2020. There is no legal impediment against Mitchell's execution.
Marlon Deon Harmon	Oklahoma	Final petition for a writ of certiorari denied by the United States Supreme Court on October 5, 2020. There is no legal impediment against Harmon's execution.
Isaiah Glenndell Tryon	Oklahoma	Final petition for a writ of certiorari denied by the United States Supreme Court on May 28, 2024. There is no legal impediment against Tryon's execution.
Darrell Wayne Frederick	Oklahoma	Final petition for a writ of certiorari denied by the United States Supreme Court on June 10, 2024. There is no legal impediment against Frederick's execution.
Mica Alexander Martinez	Comanche	Final petition for a writ of certiorari denied by the United States Supreme Court on November 10, 2025. There is no legal impediment against Martinez's execution.

== Oregon ==
- Exhausted their appeals: 0 (as of December 26, 2024)
- Immediately eligible for execution: 0
- Scheduled for execution: 0

== Pennsylvania ==
- Exhausted their appeals: 10 (as of March 23, 2026)
- Immediately eligible for execution: 0
- Scheduled for execution: 0

NOTE: There is currently a moratorium on all Pennsylvania executions imposed by Governor Josh Shapiro.

Name	County	Notes
John Charles Lesko	Westmoreland	Failed to file a final petition for a writ of certiorari to the United States Supreme Court. The Third Circuit Court of Appeals denied habeas relief on May 17, 2022. There is no legal impediment against Lesko's execution.
Robert Wharton	Philadelphia	Final petition for a writ of certiorari denied by the United States Supreme Court on March 24, 2025. There is no legal impediment against Wharton's execution.
Richard Roland Laird	Bucks	Final petition for a writ of certiorari denied by the United States Supreme Court on October 6, 2025. There is no legal impediment against Laird's execution.
Paul Gamboa Taylor	York	Final petition for a writ of certiorari denied by the United States Supreme Court on October 6, 2008. There is no legal impediment against Taylor's execution.
Sheldon Hannibal	Philadelphia	Final petition for a writ of certiorari denied by the United States Supreme Court on October 7, 2024. There is no legal impediment against Hannibal's execution.
Harvey Miguel Robinson	Lehigh	Final petition for a writ of certiorari denied by the United States Supreme Court on January 21, 2025. There is no legal impediment against Robinson's execution.
Hubert Lester Michael	York	Final petition for a writ of certiorari denied by the United States Supreme Court on June 11, 2012. There is no legal impediment against Michael's execution.
Antyane Robinson	Cumberland	Final petition for a writ of certiorari denied by the United States Supreme Court on October 15, 2015. There is no legal impediment against Robinson's execution.
Tedor Davido	Lancaster	Final petition for a writ of certiorari denied by the United States Supreme Court on March 23, 2026. There is no legal impediment against Davido's execution.
John Charles Eichinger	Montgomery	Final petition for a writ of certiorari denied by the United States Supreme Court on December 5, 2022. There is no legal impediment against Eichinger's execution.

== South Carolina ==
- Exhausted their appeals: 4 (as of January 23, 2026)
- Immediately eligible for execution: 2
- Scheduled for execution: 0

Name	County	Notes
James William Wilson Jr.	Greenwood	Final petition for a writ of certiorari denied by the United States Supreme Court on June 21, 2004. Wilson's execution is stayed pending a decision on his mental incompetency claim. (Note: There has been no legal activity in Wilson's competency appeal since 2012 so it appears there is an informal agreement between attorneys for the state and the defense to not pursue Wilson's execution; however the competency petition has not been adjudicated so the stay remains despite Wilson not being officially declared incompetent to be executed.)
Gary DuBose Terry	Lexington	Final petition for a writ of certiorari denied by the United States Supreme Court on January 10, 2022. There is no legal impediment against Terry’s execution.
John Richard Wood	Greenville	Final petition for a writ of certiorari denied by the United States Supreme Court on October 31, 2022. Currently deemed incompetent to be executed.
Steven Vernon Bixby	Abbeville	Final petition for a writ of certiorari denied by the United States Supreme Court on May 15, 2023. There is no legal impediment against Bixby's execution.

== South Dakota ==
- Exhausted their appeals: 0 (as of December 26, 2024)
- Immediately eligible for execution: 0
- Scheduled for execution: 0

== Tennessee ==
- Exhausted their appeals: 11 (as of September 30, 2026)
- Immediately eligible for execution: 8
- Scheduled for execution: 0

NOTE: There is currently a moratorium on all Tennessee executions through the end of 2026 imposed by Governor Bill Lee.

Name	County	Notes
Henry Eugene Hodges	Davidson	Final petition for a writ of certiorari denied by the United States Supreme Court on March 23, 2015. An execution date has been requested by Attorney General Jonathan Skrmetti's office.
Gary Wayne Sutton	Blount	Final petition for a writ of certiorari denied by the United States Supreme Court on March 28, 2016. There is no legal impediment against Sutton's execution.
Donald Ray Middlebrooks	Davidson	Final petition for a writ of certiorari denied by the United States Supreme Court on December 4, 2017. Middlebrooks's execution is stayed.
Tony Von Carruthers	Shelby	Final petition for a writ of certiorari denied by the United States Supreme Court on February 19, 2019. Carruthers's execution is stayed.
Farris Genner Morris Jr.	Madison	Final petition for a writ of certiorari denied by the United States Supreme Court on June 24, 2019. An execution date has been requested by Attorney General Jonathan Skrmetti's office.
Christa Gail Pike	Knox	Final petition for a writ of certiorari denied by the United States Supreme Court on June 8, 2020. There is no legal impediment against Pike's execution.
Jon Douglas Hall	Madison	Final petition for a writ of certiorari denied by the United States Supreme Court on April 25, 2022. An execution date has been requested by Attorney General Jonathan Skrmetti's office.
Terry Lynn King	Knox	Final petition for a writ of certiorari denied by the United States Supreme Court on March 20, 2023. King's execution is stayed.
Kevin B. Burns	Shelby	Final petition for a writ of certiorari denied by the United States Supreme Court on April 24, 2023. An execution date has been requested by Attorney General Jonathan Skrmetti's office.
William Glenn Rogers	Montgomery	Final petition for a writ of certiorari denied by the United States Supreme Court on February 20, 2024. An execution date has been requested by Attorney General Jonathan Skrmetti's office.
Kennath Artez Henderson	Fayette	Final petition for a writ of certiorari denied by the United States Supreme Court on March 18, 2024. An execution date has been requested by Attorney General Jonathan Skrmetti's office.

== Texas ==
- Exhausted their appeals: 80 (as of November 19, 2026)
- Immediately eligible for execution: 63
- Scheduled for execution: 3

Name	Prison number	County	Notes
Robert Leslie Roberson III	999442	Anderson	Final petition for a writ of certiorari denied by the United States Supreme Court on February 29, 2016. Roberson's execution is stayed.
Harvey Earvin	577	Angelina	Final petition for a writ of certiorari denied by the United States Supreme Court on March 20, 1989. There is no legal impediment against Earvin's execution.
Rodney Rodell Reed	999271	Bastrop	Final petition for a writ of certiorari denied by the United States Supreme Court on November 3, 2014. There is no legal impediment against Reed's execution.
Carlos Trevino	999235	Bexar	Final petition for a writ of certiorari denied by the United States Supreme Court on June 4, 2018. Scheduled to be executed on April 6, 2027.
Obie D. Weathers III	999396	Bexar	The United States Supreme Court remanded the case to the Fifth Circuit Court of Appeals on November 14, 2017, and on February 15, 2019 it again upheld the sentence. There is no legal impediment against Weathers's execution.
Joe Michael Luna	999509	Bexar	Final petition for a writ of certiorari denied by the United States Supreme Court on December 13, 2021. Scheduled to be executed on May 3, 2027.
Joseph Gamboa	999526	Bexar	Final petition for a writ of certiorari denied by the United States Supreme Court on May 13, 2024. There is no legal impediment against Gamboa's execution.
Julius Jerome Murphy	999279	Bowie	Final petition for a writ of certiorari denied by the United States Supreme Court on January 9, 2006. There is no legal impediment against Murphy's execution.
Anibal Canales Jr.	999366	Bowie	Final petition for a writ of certiorari denied by the United States Supreme Court on June 30, 2022. There is no legal impediment against Canales's execution.
William Keith Speer	999398	Bowie	Final petition for a writ of certiorari denied by the United States Supreme Court on June 13, 2022. Speer's execution is stayed.
Marcus Ray Tyrone Druery	999464	Brazos	Final petition for a writ of certiorari denied by the United States Supreme Court on February 21, 2012. Currently deemed incompetent to be executed.
Jose Alfredo Rivera	999102	Cameron	Failed to file a final petition for a writ of certiorari to the United States Supreme Court. The Fifth Circuit Court of Appeals denied habeas relief on November 27, 2002. Rivera's execution is stayed.
Ruben Gutierrez	999308	Cameron	Final petition for a writ of certiorari denied by the United States Supreme Court on November 30, 2015. Gutierrez's execution is stayed.
Melissa Elizabeth Lucio	999537	Cameron	Final petition for a writ of certiorari denied by the United States Supreme Court on October 18, 2021. There is no legal impediment against Lucio's execution.
Víctor Hugo Saldaño	999203	Collin	Final petition for a writ of certiorari denied by the United States Supreme Court on November 18, 2019. There is no legal impediment against Saldano's execution.
Raul Cortez	999543	Collin	Final petition for a writ of certiorari denied by the United States Supreme Court on October 30, 2017. There is no legal impediment against Cortez's execution.
Mark Allen Robertson	992	Dallas	Final petition for a writ of certiorari denied by the United States Supreme Court on October 1, 2018. Robertson's execution is stayed.
Charles Don Flores	999299	Dallas	Final petition for a writ of certiorari denied by the United States Supreme Court on January 25, 2016. An execution date has been requested for Flores.
Patrick Henry Murphy Jr.	999461	Dallas	Final petition for a writ of certiorari denied by the United States Supreme Court on November 19, 2018. Scheduled to be executed on April 7, 2027.
Roderick Napoleon Harris	999573	Dallas	Final petition for a writ of certiorari denied by the United States Supreme Court on November 9, 2026. There is no legal impediment against Harris's execution.
Michael Dean Gonzales	999174	Ector	Final petition for a writ of certiorari denied by the United States Supreme Court on February 24, 2020. There is no legal impediment against Gonzales's execution.
David Leonard Wood	999051	El Paso	Final petition for a writ of certiorari denied by the United States Supreme Court on April 14, 2008. Wood's execution is stayed.
Tony Egbuna Ford	999075	El Paso	Final petition for a writ of certiorari denied by the United States Supreme Court on January 9, 2006. An execution date has been requested for Ford.
Rigoberto Avila Jr.	999391	El Paso	Final petition for a writ of certiorari denied by the United States Supreme Court on November 2, 2009. There is no legal impediment against Avila's execution.
Fabian Hernandez	999553	El Paso	Final petition for a writ of certiorari denied by the United States Supreme Court on October 7, 2019. There is no legal impediment against Hernandez's execution.
Andre Lee Thomas	999493	Grayson	Final petition for a writ of certiorari denied by the United States Supreme Court on October 11, 2022. The trial court is reviewing Thomas's competency to be executed.
Brian Edward Davis	999036	Harris	Failed to file a final petition for a writ of certiorari to the United States Supreme Court. The Fifth Circuit Court of Appeals denied habeas relief on August 20, 2025. There is no legal impediment against Davis's execution.
George Edward McFarland	999046	Harris	Final petition for a writ of certiorari denied by the United States Supreme Court on December 5, 2022. There is no legal impediment against McFarland's execution.
Gerald Cornelius Eldridge	999108	Harris	Final petition for a writ of certiorari denied by the United States Supreme Court on June 5, 2017. There is no legal impediment against Eldridge's execution.
Charles Douglas Raby	999109	Harris	Final petition for a writ of certiorari denied by the United States Supreme Court on January 13, 2020. There is no legal impediment against Raby's execution.
Erica Yvonne Sheppard	999144	Harris	Final petition for a writ of certiorari denied by the United States Supreme Court on May 24, 2021. There is no legal impediment against Sheppard's execution.
Anthony Shawn Medina	999204	Harris	Final petition for a writ of certiorari denied by the United States Supreme Court on March 31, 2025. There is no legal impediment against Medina's execution.
Paul Wayne Slater	999208	Harris	Final petition for a writ of certiorari denied by the United States Supreme Court on October 1, 2018. There is no legal impediment against Slater's execution.
Howard Paul Guidry	999226	Harris	Final petition for a writ of certiorari denied by the United States Supreme Court on February 22, 2022. There is no legal impediment against Guidry's execution.
Carlos Manuel Ayestas	999240	Harris	Final petition for a writ of certiorari denied by the United States Supreme Court on February 24, 2020. There is no legal impediment against Ayestas's execution.
Chuong Duong Tong	999260	Harris	Final petition for a writ of certiorari denied by the United States Supreme Court on October 7, 2024. There is no legal impediment against Tong's execution.
Felix Rocha	999291	Harris	Final petition for a writ of certiorari denied by the United States Supreme Court on October 11, 2011. There is no legal impediment against Rocha's execution.
Britt Allen Ripkowski	999325	Harris	Final petition for a writ of certiorari denied by the United States Supreme Court on February 21, 2012. Currently deemed incompetent to be executed.
Anthony Cardell Haynes	999330	Harris	Final petition for a writ of certiorari denied by the United States Supreme Court on January 14, 2019. There is no legal impediment against Haynes's execution.
Charles Mamou Jr.	999333	Harris	Final petition for a writ of certiorari denied by the United States Supreme Court on February 19, 2019. There is no legal impediment against Mamou's execution.
Bernardo Aban Tercero	999369	Harris	Final petition for a writ of certiorari denied by the United States Supreme Court on June 30, 2014. There is no legal impediment against Tercero's execution.
Travis Dwight Green	999373	Harris	Final petition for a writ of certiorari denied by the United States Supreme Court on May 13, 2024. There is no legal impediment against Green's execution.
Kerry Dimart Allen	999386	Harris	Final petition for a writ of certiorari denied by the United States Supreme Court on May 23, 2016. There is no legal impediment against Allen's execution.
Robert Lee Woodard	999388	Harris	Final petition for a writ of certiorari denied by the United States Supreme Court on January 9, 2012. There is no legal impediment against Woodard's execution.
Robert Gene Will II	999402	Harris	Final petition for a writ of certiorari denied by the United States Supreme Court on October 18, 2021. There is no legal impediment against Will's execution.
Linda Anita Carty	999406	Harris	Final petition for a writ of certiorari denied by the United States Supreme Court on June 28, 2010. There is no legal impediment against Carty's execution.
Perry Allen Austin	999410	Harris	Final petition for a writ of certiorari denied by the United States Supreme Court on June 11, 2018. There is no legal impediment against Austin's execution.
Perry Eugene Williams	999420	Harris	Final petition for a writ of certiorari denied by the United States Supreme Court on December 15, 2014. There is no legal impediment against Williams's execution.
Ronald Jeffrey Prible Jr.	999433	Harris	Final petition for a writ of certiorari denied by the United States Supreme Court on June 20, 2023. There is no legal impediment against Prible's execution.
Pete Russell Jr.	999443	Harris	Final petition for a writ of certiorari denied by the United States Supreme Court on May 17, 2021. There is no legal impediment against Russell's execution.
Ray McArthur Freeney	999458	Harris	Final petition for a writ of certiorari denied by the United States Supreme Court on May 20, 2019. There is no legal impediment against Freeney's execution.
Damon Roshun Matthews	999476	Harris	Final petition for a writ of certiorari denied by the United States Supreme Court on October 30, 2017. There is no legal impediment against Matthews's execution.
Juan Jose Reynoso	999477	Harris	Final petition for a writ of certiorari denied by the United States Supreme Court on April 18, 2022. There is no legal impediment against Reynoso's execution.
Edgardo Rafael Cubas	999480	Harris	Final petition for a writ of certiorari denied by the United States Supreme Court on February 19, 2013. There is no legal impediment against Cubas's execution.
Anthony Quinn Francois	999482	Harris	Failed to file a final petition for a writ of certiorari to the United States Supreme Court. The Fifth Circuit Court of Appeals denied habeas relief on June 30, 2022. There is no legal impediment against Francois's execution.
Elijah Dwayne Joubert	999492	Harris	Final petition for a writ of certiorari denied by the United States Supreme Court on May 18, 2026. There is no legal impediment against Joubert's execution.
Demetrius Dewayne Smith	999512	Harris	Final petition for a writ of certiorari denied by the United States Supreme Court on March 9, 2020. There is no legal impediment against Smith's execution.
Christopher Devon Jackson	999524	Harris	Final petition for a writ of certiorari denied by the United States Supreme Court on November 4, 2019. There is no legal impediment against Jackson's execution.
Dexter Darnell Johnson	999527	Harris	Final petition for a writ of certiorari denied by the United States Supreme Court on January 25, 2016. Johnson's execution is stayed.
Garland Bernell Harper	999560	Harris	Final petition for a writ of certiorari denied by the United States Supreme Court on November 20, 2023. There is no legal impediment against Harper's execution.
Teddrick Roshod Batiste	999568	Harris	Final petition for a writ of certiorari denied by the United States Supreme Court on April 22, 2019. There is no legal impediment against Batiste's execution.
Jaime Piero Cole	999569	Harris	Final petition for a writ of certiorari denied by the United States Supreme Court on October 2, 2023. There is no legal impediment against Cole's execution.
Obel Cruz-Garcia	999584	Harris	Final petition for a writ of certiorari denied by the United States Supreme Court on November 10, 2025. There is no legal impediment against Cruz-Garcia's execution.
Bartholomew Granger	999579	Jefferson	Final petition for a writ of certiorari denied by the United States Supreme Court on May 19, 2025. There is no legal impediment against Granger's execution.
Jeffery Lee Wood	999256	Kerr	Final petition for a writ of certiorari denied by the United States Supreme Court on January 14, 2008. There is no legal impediment against Wood's execution.
Ramiro Rubi Ibarra	999247	McLennan	Final petition for a writ of certiorari denied by the United States Supreme Court on June 8, 2020. Ibarra's execution is stayed.
Larry Dean Hatten	999181	Nueces	Final petition for a writ of certiorari denied by the United States Supreme Court on January 25, 2010. Currently deemed incompetent to be executed.
Richard Vasquez	999319	Nueces	Final petition for a writ of certiorari denied by the United States Supreme Court on May 26, 2011. There is no legal impediment against Vasquez's execution.
Allen Winslow Bridgers	999267	Smith	Final petition for a writ of certiorari denied by the United States Supreme Court on June 26, 2008. Bridgers's execution is stayed.
Emanuel Kemp Jr.	909	Tarrant	Failed to file a final petition for a writ of certiorari to the United States Supreme Court. The Fifth Circuit Court of Appeals denied habeas relief on January 12, 2004. Kemp's execution is stayed.
Steven Kenneth Staley	999006	Tarrant	Failed to file a final petition for a writ of certiorari to the United States Supreme Court. The Fifth Circuit Court of Appeals denied habeas relief on March 23, 2005. Currently deemed incompetent to be executed.
Pablo Melendez Jr.	999192	Tarrant	Failed to file a final petition for a writ of certiorari to the United States Supreme Court. The Fifth Circuit Court of Appeals denied habeas relief on October 29, 2003. Melendez's execution is stayed.
Tilon Lashon Carter	999517	Tarrant	Final petition for a writ of certiorari denied by the United States Supreme Court on March 28, 2016. There is no legal impediment against Carter's execution.
Paul David Storey	999538	Tarrant	Final petition for a writ of certiorari denied by the United States Supreme Court on October 5, 2015. There is no legal impediment against Storey's execution.
Kwame Abia Rockwell	999570	Tarrant	Final petition for a writ of certiorari denied by the United States Supreme Court on October 2, 2017. Rockwell's execution is stayed.
Amos Joseph Wells III	999604	Tarrant	Final petition for a writ of certiorari denied by the United States Supreme Court on March 30, 2026. There is no legal impediment against Wells's execution.
Guy Len Allen	999473	Travis	Final petition for a writ of certiorari denied by the United States Supreme Court on February 29, 2016. There is no legal impediment against Allen's execution.
Paul Gilbert Devoe III	999550	Travis	Final petition for a writ of certiorari denied by the United States Supreme Court on May 14, 2018. An execution date has been requested for Devoe.
Milton Dwayne Gobert	999554	Travis	Final petition for a writ of certiorari denied by the United States Supreme Court on March 4, 2024. There is no legal impediment against Gobert's execution.
Arturo Daniel Aranda	636	Webb	Final petition for a writ of certiorari denied by the United States Supreme Court on October 2, 2023. There is no legal impediment against Aranda's execution.

== Utah ==
- Exhausted their appeals: 1 (as of November 26, 2025)
- Immediately eligible for execution: 1
- Scheduled for execution: 0

Name	County	Notes
Von Lester Taylor	Summit	Final petition for a writ of certiorari denied by the United States Supreme Court on June 13, 2022. There is no legal impediment against Taylor's execution. (Note: Although there remains no legal impediment to Taylor's execution, he has since filed a successive state post-conviction relief petition. The trial court has set a July 22, 2025 hearing to issue a scheduling conference. The conference was held on August 21, 2026, and the next hearing in the ongoing 2023 appeal is scheduled for February 2027.)

== Wyoming ==
- Exhausted their appeals: 0 (as of December 26, 2024)
- Immediately eligible for execution: 0

== See also ==
- List of people scheduled to be executed in the United States
- List of death row inmates in the United States
