= Murder of Scott Winters =

1990 murder of a police officer in Pompano Beach, Florida

Scott Winters
- Born: Scott Adam Winters; March 30, 1962; Florida, U.S.
- Died: July 29, 1990 (aged 28); Pompano Beach, Florida, U.S.
- Cause of death: Murder by shooting
- Resting place: Section North Lawn, Block 15
- Occupation: Pompano Beach Police Department (Patrolman/Officer)

On July 29, 1990, in Pompano Beach, Florida, K-9 Patrol Officer Scott Adam Winters (March 30, 1962 - July 29, 1990) of the Pompano Beach Police Department was fatally shot in the line of duty by Albert Richard Holland Jr. (born March 24, 1958), who was at that time fleeing law enforcement following a sexual assault and attempted murder committed hours earlier. Upon encountering Officer Winters during the search, Holland engaged in a physical struggle with the officer before shooting him with his service weapon. Holland, who was named a suspect in an unrelated second murder, was charged, convicted and sentenced to death for murdering Officer Winters. Holland is currently on death row awaiting execution as of 2026.

== Murder ==
On July 29, 1990, at a field in Pompano Beach, Florida, 32-year-old Albert Richard Holland Jr. attacked a woman for refusing to have sex with him. Holland used bottles to beat the woman in the head several times and atttempted to rape her. However, a witness who saw the attack interrupted Holland, forcing him to flee the scene and left the semi-conscious woman behind with head injuries.

The attack prompted the authorities to keep a lookout for a suspect resembling Holland, and a short time later, 28-year-old Pompano Beach K-9 Patrol Officer Scott Adams Winters, who was one of the cops participating in the manhunt for Holland, encountered him and attempted to arrest him for questioning in the attack of the woman. A scuffle occurred between both Officer Winters and Holland, the latter who was hit with the Officer's nightstick and restrained with a headlock. However, Holland grabbed the gun from Officer Winters's belt and shot him twice in the groin and lower stomach area.

Despite being mortally wounded, Officer Winters was able to use the radio and inform the other officers that he was shot by Holland, who was caught not long after the shooting, which was witnessed by several bystanders, some of whom followed Holland and helped the other officers to arrest him. Officer Winters was rushed to the North Broward Medical Center for treatment, but an hour after the shooting, he died to his wounds. Early reports initially identified Holland by his alias "Antonio Rivera" before his real identity was uncovered.

The funeral was set to be held at First Presbyterian Church, before his body would be buried in the Pompano Beach Cemetery. Officer Winters's funeral wake was attended by nearly 2,000 police officers, firefighters and paramedics. At the time of his death, Officer Winters left behind his mother and wife, and served three years of service in the Pompano Beach Police Department.

== Charges ==
On August 1, 1990, Albert Holland was charged with the first-degree murder of Officer Scott Winters, and the attempted murder and attempted sexual battery of the woman he attacked hours before murdering Officer Winters.

While pending trial for the murder of Officer Winters, the mental competency of Holland was put to question. Prior to the offence, Holland had a extensive history of mental illnesses and he was arrested for robbery charges in Washington, D.C., before a court judged him legally insane due to schizophrenia in 1982. After this ruling, Holland was held at the St. Elizabeth’s Hospital, where he escaped twice before he relocated to Florida at some point after his second escape in 1986. If he was ruled mentally incompetent, Holland would be indefintely detained in a medical facility until his mental state improved enough to be fit for trial or the charges were dropped against him.

On August 16, 1990, a Broward County grand jury formally indicted Holland on one count of first-degree murder in the death of Officer Winters and one count each of attempted murder, armed robbery and sexual battery in the woman's case. For the most serious charge of first-degree murder, Holland faced the death penalty or life imprisonment if found guilty under Florida state law.

On December 4, 1990, Broward Circuit Judge M. Daniel Futch Jr. ruled that Holland was mentally competent to be tried for the murder of Officer Winters. He accepted the testimony of psychiatrist Abbey Strauss that Holland was malingering and feigned his mental illness on several occasions.

=== Suspected second murder ===
Shortly after his arrest, Holland was named as a suspect in a second murder case. In that case, 31-year-old Chilita Wright was discovered dead in a wooded area nearby a local school in Daytona Beach, Florida. An autopsy report showed that Wright was struck on her head before being pressed face down into the dirt by her attacker, which led to her death by suffocation, and there were no signs pointing to either robbery or sexual assault as a motive. Wright was one of five African-American women found dead within the past 26 months within the same area but the police concluded that none of the five murders were connected to each other and it was not the work of a serial killer.

Police investigations revealed that a African-American man with a light complexion was last seen at the murder scene before the discovery of Wright's body, and released a police sketch of the man. The suspect was described to be aged between 35 to 40, with a thin to medium build and height of six feet or six feet two, and possessed a full beard, mustache and a full Afro hairstyle. The man was also noted to have played the harmonica very well and frequently played in the area.

After the arrest of Holland, the police suspected that Holland was involved in the murder of Wright, after he was identified as the last person together with the victim before her death. According to Daytona Beach police investigator Les Burton, Holland strongly resembled the suspect featured in the composite sketch. Holland was additionally suspected to be the perpetrator in an unrelated rape case in Daytona Beach.

== Trial of Albert Holland ==
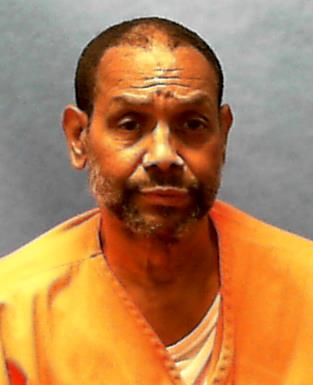
Albert Richard Holland

On July 8, 1991, Albert Holland officially stood trial for the murder of Officer Scott Winters. Jury selection began on the first day of his trial. Reports revealed that the selection phase got off on a rocky start because Holland disrupted the proceedings by declaring his unhappiness towards his defence counsel, with the trial judge warning him that he would be gagged, shackled or removed from the courtroom if he continued this behaviour. Ultimately, Holland was removed from the courtroom due to disruptive and uncooperative behaviour and he was placed in a nearby room and had to watch the proceedings unfold on court television.

During the trial itself, the court summoned the witnesses of the shooting to testify and describe the turn of events on the day of Officer Winters's murder. The defence tried to pursue an insanity defence in light of Holland's extensive history of psychiatric disorders, and asked the jury to find the defendant not guilty by reason of insanity. In rebuttal, the prosecution described the murder of Officer Winters as a calculated act committed by Holland to evade arrest for attacking and trying to rape the woman.

On August 2, 1991, the jury found Holland guilty of first-degree murder after they deliberated for about three hours and rejected his insanity plea.

On August 12, 1991, the jury recommended the death penalty for Holland on a 11–1 majority vote.

On August 19, 1991, Holland was formally sentenced to death in the electric chair by Broward Circuit Judge M. Daniel Futch Jr., after he accepted the jury's decision. Aside from the death sentence, the judge also sentenced Holland to consecutive sentences of life in prison for sexual battery with a deadly weapon, 40 years for assault with intent to commit murder and 17 years for robbery with a firearm.

The death penalty trial of Holland was reportedly the most expensive criminal trial to take place in Broward County, and the total cost was estimated to be $300,000 as of July 1991. It was reported in April 1992 that the monetary costs of funding Holland's trial defence amounted to over $239,000, including a $96,075 fee for Holland's court-appointed lawyer Peter Giacoma.

== Holland's first appeal and murder re-trial ==
On March 24, 1994, the Florida Supreme Court heard Albert Holland's appeal and overturned both his murder conviction and death sentence, and ordered a re-trial, after they found that a court-appointed psychologist had improperly interviewed him in the absence of his lawyers and the evidence was used in the trial to rule Holland as mentally competent to stand trial for Officer Scott Winters's murder, which violated his constitutional rights against self-incrimination and to consult with legal counsel.

Holland's re-trial for Officer Winters's murder took place in October 1996. During the proceedings, Holland admitted that he indeed attacked the woman before the murder of Officer Winters, but he stated he could not remember how he killed the officer. The defence once again sought to have Holland acquitted based on the defence of insanity, while the prosecution sought to re-convict Holland of first-degree murder and portrayed him as a cold-blooded and calculating murderer for killing a police officer while on the run for the woman's attack and attempted sexual assault.

On November 6, 1996, Holland was found guilty of first-degree murder for the second time.

On November 15, 1996, by a majority vote of 8–4, the jury recommended that Holland should receive the death penalty once again.

On February 7, 1997, Holland was re-sentenced to death by Broward Circuit Judge Charles Greene, who aligned himself with the jury's recommendation for capital punishment.

== Further appeals ==
On October 6, 2000, the Florida Supreme Court rejected Albert Holland's appeal against his second death sentence.

On November 10, 2005, Holland lost his second appeal to the Florida Supreme Court against his death sentence.

On June 14, 2010, Holland was granted writ of certiorari by the U.S. Supreme Court by a 7–2 ruling. In his appeal, the court found that Holland deserved to pursue further federal appeals against his death sentence and explain why he missed the deadline to do so, due to ineffective legal counsel handling his case. The case was sent back to the 11th U.S. Circuit Court of Appeals for furher review.

On April 20, 2012, U.S. District Judge Patricia A. Seitz allowed Holland's appeal and overturned his murder conviction and death sentence, after she ruled that the original trial judge, Broward Circuit Judge Charles Greene, had erred in denying Holland his right to represent himself in his trial without counsel. The Broward County State Attorney's Office expressed their intent to appeal against this decision.

On December 30, 2014, the 11th U.S. Circuit Court of Appeals officially restored the death sentence and murder conviction of Holland after they accepted the prosecution's appeal and overturned the lower court's ruling. The court ruled that the trial judge was correct to not accept Holland's request to represent himself in court in view of his longstanding history of mental illnesses.

On November 1, 2019, the 11th U.S. Circuit Court of Appeals denied another federal appeal from Holland.

As of 2026, Holland remains on death row at the Union Correctional Institution. His execution date has yet to be scheduled.

== Aftermath ==
In May 1992, two years after the murder of Officer Winters, a ceremony was held in Broward County to honor the 37 local police officers who died in the line of duty, including Officer Winters, who was the first and only Pompano Beach police officer on the list.

In September 1999, Commissioner Kay McGinn proposed to the city to name a park after Officer Winters, although Mayor E. Pat Larkins expressed he was not in favour of such a move since there was a local street named after the victim. It was also reported that the Broward County Sheriff's Office planned to establish a new police dog training facility and considered naming the building after Officer Winters. By July 2000, the tenth anniversary of Officer Winters's death, the Scott Winters Memorial Park was opened to the public.

In June 2014, 24 years after the murder of Officer Winters, the Broward County Sheriff's Office held a memorial service to commemorate the lives of Officer Winters, and another three police officers and two firefighters who died in the line of duty from 1977 to 2007.

== See also ==
- Capital punishment in Florida
- List of death row inmates in the United States § Florida
