= Murders of John Bowers and Madeline Weisser =

1992 murders of a mother-son pair in Hudson, Florida

- Location: Hudson, Florida, United States
- Date: January 26, 1992; 34 years ago
- Attack type: Burglary; Murder by shooting Murder by stabbing
- Weapons: Shotgun; Knife
- Victims: John Bowers, 55; Madeline Weisser, 75
- Verdict: Guilty
- Convictions: First-degree murder (Kane, Garner, Morton); Accessory to murder (Walker); Conspiracy to commit armed robbery (Walker)
- Sentence: Morton; Death (March 18, 1994); Garner; Life imprisonment (April 6, 1994); Kane; Life imprisonment (May 27, 1994); Walker; 15 years' imprisonment (April 29, 1994)
- Convicted: Alvin Leroy Morton, 19; Robert Dale Garner, 17; Christopher Marvin Walker, 16; Timothy John Kane, 14

On January 26, 1992, inside their house in Hudson, Florida, a mother-son pair, 55-year-old John Bowers and 75-year-old Madeline Weisser, were murdered by three teenagers during a burglary attempt. Bowers was shot to death while Weisser was lethally stabbed in the neck by their attackers. The three killers – Alvin Leroy Morton (born July 11, 1972), Bobby Garner (born May 20, 1974) and Timothy John Kane (born October 20, 1977) – were all arrested and charged with first-degree murder. Out of the trio, Morton, who was 19 years old and the only adult member of the trio, was found guilty and sentenced to death, while both Garner and Kane, aged 17 and 14 respectively, were sentenced to life imprisonment. A fourth teenager, 16-year-old Christopher Marvin Walker (born January 2, 1976), was sentenced to 15 years after he pleaded guilty as an accessory to murder.

== Murders ==
On the evening of January 26, 1992, 16-year-old Christopher Marvin Walker brought his four adolescent friends to the house of his two neighbors, 55-year-old John Bowers and 75-year-old Madeline Weisser, with the intention to steal from the pair, who were both mother and son. Three of Walker's friends – 19-year-old Alvin Leroy Morton, 17-year-old Robert Dale "Bobby" Garner and 14-year-old Timothy John Kane – entered the house while the fourth, 15-year-old Michael "Mike" Rodkey, chose to not join the burglary and stayed outside the house. Morton was armed with a sawed-off shotgun while another one of the teenagers carried a knife.

Upon entering the house, Morton, Kane and Garner were searching the living room when both Weisser and Bowers entered the room and encountered them. Morton held the two victims at gunpoint and forced them to the floor. Garner also kicked Weisser on the head. While Bowers pleaded for mercy and agreed to give whatever the robbers demanded, Morton placed the barrel of the gun at the back of Bowers' neck as the latter tried to rise, and opened fire, killing Bowers instantly. Morton tried to shoot Weisser next, but the shotgun jammed, and as a result, Morton wielded the knife and stabbed Weisser on the neck. However, the knife failed to penetrate, and hence, Garner stepped onto the knife to push it in, which cut Weisser's spinal cord and killed her as well. According to Kane, he did not take part in the killings and instead hid behind a dining room table out of fear towards the sudden burst of violence.

After the killings, Morton chopped off Weisser's pinkie finger, and he and Garner continued to ransack the house for valuables. Afterwards, both Garner and Morton set fire to the house, before they escaped with Kane. Walker, who had earlier fled the house at the sight of Morton's shotgun, later met up with the trio, and Morton gave him the severed pinkie finger of Weisser. Subsequently, Morton would show the finger to their friend Jeff Madden, and boasted about the killing. Madden had earlier jokingly challenged Morton to bring him proof of his kill, and was greatly shocked to see the severed finger. The finger was subsequently shown to several more friends before it was disposed of in a canal.

Meanwhile, the police were alerted to the fire at the house of Weisser and Bowers, and they discovered the bodies of the mother-son pair, as well as the dead bodies of the victims' two pet poodles (both of which were killed by Morton earlier on). Two hours after the double murder, the police managed to arrest the three juveniles, and as for Morton, he was arrested on January 27, 1992, after police investigators found him hiding in the attic of his house. According to police detective William Lawless, when they were arrested, the four boys did not show any remorse for the murders of Bowers and Weisser.

== Charges ==
On January 28, 1992, the four youngsters were all charged for their involvement in the double murder. The three minors, whose names were temporarily withheld at this point, were charged in the juvenile courts: Kane and Garner with first-degree murder and Walker with accessory to murder. Morton was charged with first-degree murder as well in another court. It was reported that Kane's father had visited him in jail after his son's arrest, and he professed his love for his son despite the horrific nature of the double murder, which brought shock to the community. Rodkey was never charged for the murder or robbery due to him choosing to not join the others in entering the house and even backed out of the plan.

On February 5, 1992, the four teenage suspects were formally indicted by a grand jury, with Walker facing charges of accessory to murder and the remaining three – Kane, Garner and Morton – facing first-degree murder charges. The three juveniles were confirmed to be tried as adults in their upcoming trials, and were detained at the Pasco Juvenile Detention Center, while Morton, the sole adult offender of the case, was detained at the Central Pasco Detention Center.

In April 1992, Walker filed a motion to lower the $250,000 bail offered to him. Circuit Judge Bruce Boyer agreed to reduce the bail amount to $25,000.

On December 26, 1992, Assistant State Attorney Michael Halkitis confirmed that Walker would not face the death penalty for the double murder, while the death penalty would be requested in the cases of both Morton and Garner, because unlike the duo, Walker was 14 years old at the time of the double murder and prior to the 2005 landmark case of Roper v. Simmons (which barred the death penalty for juveniles), only youth offenders aged 16 and above were eligible for a potential death sentence under the state laws of Florida.

In March 1993, it was decided that Morton, Kane and Garner would stand trial in separate courts for the murder charges they faced.

== Trials of the teenagers ==
=== Walker ===
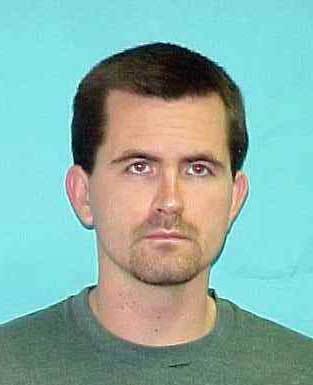
Christopher Marvin Walker (pictured in 2001)

On December 7, 1992, Walker pleaded guilty to charges of being an accessory to murder and conspiracy to commit armed robbery, and hence became the first of the four offenders to be convicted in the murder case. For the charges he admitted to, Walker faced the maximum sentence of 35 years in prison.

Walker's sentencing was not carried out immediately after his conviction. While he was pending to be sentenced, Walker was classified as a witness for the upcoming murder trials of his remaining accomplices. Walker's attorney, Assistant Public Defender Edward Liebling, had earlier on tried to persuade Walker to not become a witness because the prosecution did not promise him a reduced sentence in exchange for his plea of guilt. Walker's sentencing would take place at a later date upon the completion of his testimony and the trials of the trio.

On April 29, 1994, more than a year after Walker's conviction, Circuit Judge Craig Villanti sentenced Walker to 15 years' imprisonment, which was triple the recommended sentencing guideline for the offences he was convicted of. Villanti remarked that Walker directed his friends to commit burglary at the house of his own neighbours and caused their deaths, and pointed that Walker chose the "cowardly" way out by fleeing the house while leaving both Weisser and Bowers at the mercy of their killers instead of saving the victims or himself, which warranted a harsh penalty under the law.

Walker was released on February 17, 2001, after he served seven years out of his sentence.

=== Morton ===
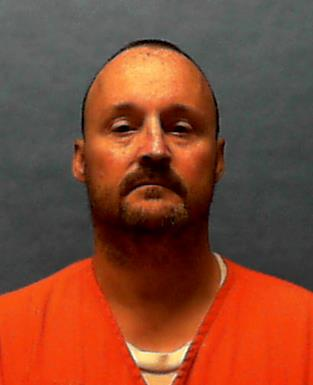
2026 mugshot of Alvin Morton

Alvin Morton was the second perpetrator of the four to be put on trial before a 12-member jury, which was assembled at the end of the trial's jury selection on January 31, 1994.

On February 4, 1994, Morton was found guilty of both counts of first-degree murder by the jury.

During the sentencing trial of Morton, the defence argued that Morton's troubled childhood made him unable to nurture conscience and was a direct result of his murderous actions. It was revealed that Morton's father, who was convicted of manslaughter, aggravated assault and arson, had abused Morton and both his mother and sister, and the abuse prompted Morton's mother to leave the family when Morton was seven. Apart from this, Morton's father was also alcoholic and even committed incest, and these details of Morton's dysfunctional family background were raised by the defence to oppose a possible death sentence.

On February 9, 1994, the jury recommended the death penalty by a majority vote of 11–1, after they rejected the defence's arguments of Morton's troubled childhood from their mitigation plea.

Prior to his sentencing, Morton's lawyers appealed for a new trial, claiming that Morton was not subjected to a fair trial, but the motion was denied on February 25, 1994.

On March 18, 1994, Circuit Judge Craig Villanti formally sentenced Morton to death by the electric chair for both the murders of Madeline Weisser and John Bowers. During sentencing, Judge Villanti quoted, "These were crimes of great cowardice committed in a cold, insensitive way by a cold insensitive individual." Grace Bowers, the wife of John Bowers, stated that Morton deserved to be executed since he never showed mercy to her husband and mother-in-law, and added that both Morton and Garner (who was earlier sentenced to life) should have faced the death penalty.

=== Garner ===
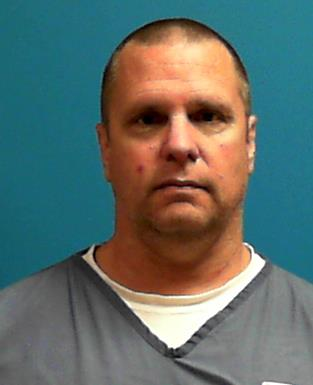
2026 mugshot of Bobby Garner

Bobby Garner was the third member of the four to stand trial for the double murder on February 27, 1994. During the trial itself, Garner testified in his defence that he did not kill any of the victims, and pinpointed the blame on Morton as the ringleader and the one who directly killed both the victims. Garner also claimed he made the mistake of following Morton's lead without knowing that murder was a probable consequence of the burglary attempt. The prosecution, however, rebutted that Garner was equally culpable as Morton in the killings, even if accepting that he never directly killed anyone, because he willingly took part in the crime and knew what would happen.

On March 3, 1994, the jury found Garner guilty and convicted him of first-degree murder on both counts.

On March 9, 1994, the jury recommended that Garner be sentenced to life imprisonment with the possibility of parole after 25 years, after they considered that he was a mere follower in midst of the murders offences, thus sparing him the death sentence. The trial judge would formally pass sentence on April 6, 1994.

On April 6, 1994, Garner was sentenced to two consecutive life sentences for both counts of murder, and since his life terms each carried the chance of parole after a minimum of 25 years and were served back-to-back, he would not be eligible for parole for 50 years until 2042, and at that point, Garner would be 67 years old.

As of 2026, Garner is incarcerated at the Hardee Correctional Institution.

=== Kane ===
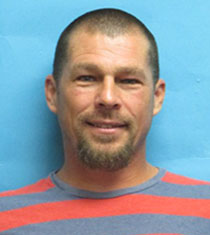
2017 mugshot of Timothy Kane

Kane was the final defendant to claim trial for the double murder. During the proceedings, Kane took the stand and testified in his defence that he believed the house to be empty before entering it, and saw the shotgun but never knew that it was loaded. Kane also stated that he followed both Garner and Morton under the belief that it was just a burglary attempt, without knowing that death would occur, and he denied cutting the phone cord during the killings despite the fact that both Morton and Garner claimed he had done so. The prosecution, however, sought to prove that Kane's actions constituted as murder, since he knowingly participated in an act of felony and if that act led to the death of the victim(s), Kane would still be considered guilty of first-degree murder.

On April 15, 1994, Kane was found guilty of two counts of first-degree murder, thus becoming the last of the four to be convicted of any involvement in the murders. However, unlike Morton and Garner, Kane did not face the death penalty since his age of 14 at the time of the offences made him ineligible for capital punishment.

On May 27, 1994, Kane was sentenced to two concurrent life terms for both the murders of Bowers and Weisser, and as such, he would be eligible for parole after a minimum of 25 years. The defence earlier submitted that Kane should not be given consecutive life sentences on the account that he did not harm anyone during the murders and had only intended to commit burglary, and that he also wanted to escape the house before the killings.

== Appeals of Morton ==
On March 6, 1997, Alvin Morton's two death sentences for the double murder were both overturned by the Florida Supreme Court upon his appeal.

On March 1, 1999, Morton was re-sentenced to death by a second jury based on a 11-1 vote.

On June 28, 2001, Morton's appeal against his second death sentence was denied by the Florida Supreme Court.

On August 28, 2008, the Florida Supreme Court rejected Morton's post-conviction appeal and upheld his death sentences.

On February 2, 2018, Morton's appeal for re-sentencing was denied by the Florida Supreme Court. At that point, the state of Florida had passed new laws to allow the imposition of death sentences via only unanimous jury decisions (before the law was overruled in 2023). The court rejected the appeal because Morton's death sentence was finalized in 2001 and therefore, he was ineligible for re-sentencing under the revised law.

As of May 2019, Morton was one of six inmates from Pasco County awaiting execution on Florida's death row.

As of 2026, Morton remains incarcerated on death row at the Union Correctional Institution.

== Kane's incarceration and release ==
After his sentencing, Timothy Kane started to serve his life sentence in the Sumter Correctional Institution. During the first few years into his incarceration, Kane worked for a prison chaplain, and even spent 12 years stamping logos on state letterhead. Kane also began his studies in prison and obtained his GED, and during his imprisonment, his mother died and he was granted leave to attend the funeral while shackled and handcuffed. By 2010, Kane was noted to have displayed good behaviour behind bars and did not have a disciplinary report. It was also reported that Kane was originally a academically-inclined student who later gone astray due to his parents' divorce and it led to him joining the other perpetrators of the case into committing the robbery-murders.

In September 2016, Kane was reviewed for parole and after assessing his case, the Florida Commission on Offender Review agreed to release Kane on February 23, 2017. It was additionally arranged that after his tentative release from prison, Kane would spend 18 months in transitional programs until 2018.

About 25 years after the murders of Weisser and Bowers, Kane was released from prison on February 23, 2017.

== See also ==
- Capital punishment in Florida
- List of death row inmates in the United States § Florida
