= Murder of Brett Bowyer =

2002 kidnapping and murder of a 12-year-old boy in Alabama

- Location: Russell County, Alabama, United States
- Date: April 17–18, 2002
- Attack type: Kidnapping; Attempted murder Murder by shooting
- Weapon: Handgun
- Victims: William Brett Bowyer, 12 (murdered); Forrest Bowyer, 53 (survived)
- Verdict: Guilty
- Convictions: Capital murder
- Sentence: Carruth; Death (December 5, 2003); Brooks; Death (April 9, 2004)
- Convicted: Michael David Carruth, 43; Jimmy Lee Brooks Jr., 22

On April 18, 2002, in Russell County, Alabama, 12-year-old William Brett Bowyer (better known as Brett Bowyer) and his father were both kidnapped by two men posing as police officers. Bowyer was shot to death and buried alongside his father, who survived despite a slash wound on his neck and was able to dig his way out and seek help. The two murderers, Michael David Carruth (born April 10, 1958) and Jimmy Lee Brooks Jr. (born September 9, 1979), were arrested and charged with capital murder and attempted murder. The pair, who were involved in an unrelated double murder a month prior in Alabama, were found guilty of capital murder and sentenced to death. As of 2026, both Brooks and Carruth remain on death row awaiting execution.

== Murder ==
Between the evening of April 17, 2002, and the early morning hours of April 18, 2002, in Phenix City, Alabama, two men, 22-year-old Jimmy Lee Brooks Jr. and 43-year-old Michael David Carruth, disguised themselves as police officers and approached the house of 12-year-old William Brett Bowyer (better known as Brett Bowyer) and his 53-year-old father Forrest "Butch" Bowyer. The father-son pair were handcuffed and abducted by the pair, who took both of them to a remote road construction site in a rural part of the county.

After reaching the construction site, both Carruth and Brooks interrogated Brett Bowyer's father Butch about a safe. Bowyer and his father were taken back to their house in order to get money for both Brooks and Carruth. Inside the house, Carruth slapped Butch while Brooks searched the house and found $47,000 in cash and a .38 caliber Smith & Wesson revolver. Afterwards, the duo once again took the father-son pair to the same construction site. At the site itself, both Brooks and Carruth slashed Butch in his throat from ear to ear, and during the act itself, Bowyer pleaded with his captors to not hurt his father, to no avail.

After slashing Butch, Carruth approached Bowyer with a revolver, shooting the boy once in the head, and while the boy collapsed, Brooks would inflict a further two gunshot wounds to Bowyer's head, and the boy died due to lethal gunshot injuries to his head. Afterwards, both Bowyer and Butch were left inside a shallow grave dug by their captors, who threw soil on them and buried the father-son pair, before they fled the construction site.

Despite being buried alive and sustaining a neck wound, Butch managed to survive by digging himself out of the grave and flagging down a passing motorist for help. The police were later contacted, and Butch identified both Brooks and Carruth as the killers of his son.

== Trials of Carruth and Brooks ==
=== Charges ===
On February 20, 2002, Michael Carruth and Jimmy Brooks Jr. were charged with multiple counts of attempted murder, kidnapping, robbery and capital murder. For the most serious charge of capital murder, both men potentially faced the death penalty under Alabama state law.

This was not the first time both Carruth and Brooks had committed murder. In fact, on January 30, 2002, about three weeks before they killed Brett Bowyer, the pair and a third accomplice named James Edward Gary Jr. robbed and murdered a married couple, 68-year-old Thurman Ray Ratliff, and his wife, 62-year-old Katherine Combs Ratliff, in Opelika, Alabama. The Ratliffs were found with multiple gunshot wounds in their home by their daughter and about $87,000 in cash was missing from the home. Both Brooks and Carruth were later linked to the double murder after their arrests for Bowyer's murder.

On February 22, 2002, both Brooks and Carruth were charged with two additional counts of capital murder for the killings of the Ratliffs, alongside Gary. Gary was found guilty of capital murder for his involvement in the double murder in October 2005, and sentenced to life in prison without the possibility of parole.

=== Carruth's trial ===
Michael David Carruth

In early October 2003, Carruth stood trial for the capital murder of Brett Bowyer. Bowyer's father came to court to testify against Carruth and the jury also heard evidence and testimony from at least 14 witnesses, including a forensic ballistics expert who matched the .38 revolver as the murder weapon.

On October 9, 2003, the jury found Carruth guilty of capital murder, attempted murder, robbery and kidnapping.

On October 11, 2003, by a unanimous decision, the jury recommended the death penalty for Carruth.

On December 4, 2003, Russell County Circuit Judge Albert Johnson formally sentenced Carruth to death for the capital murder of Bowyer.

=== Brooks's trial ===
Jimmy Lee Brooks Jr.

On February 3, 2004, Jimmy Brooks became the second perpetrator to stand trial for the capital murder of Bowyer. His trial was moved to Talladega County due to pre-trial publicity. The jury were allowed to hear the videotaped confession of Brooks, and the father of Bowyer was expected to testify against Brooks in court.

On February 9, 2004, Brooks was found guilty by the jury of capital murder.

On February 10, 2004, the jury unanimously voted for the death penalty in Brooks's case.

On April 9, 2004, Brooks was formally sentenced to death by Judge Al Johnson.

== Appeals ==
=== Carruth ===
On August 26, 2005, the Alabama Court of Criminal Appeals rejected Carruth's appeal and upheld his conviction and death penalty for capital murder and also his conviction and sentence for attempted murder. However, his robbery and burglary convictions were overturned in the same ruling.

In 2006, a trial judge granted more time for Carruth to file an appeal against his death sentence to the Alabama Supreme Court, after he missed a deadline to do so previously. On May 30, 2008, the Alabama Court of Criminal Appeals overturned this ruling and denied Carruth's appeal.

On January 24, 2009, the Alabama Supreme Court further denied Carruth leave to appeal to the state Supreme Court against his death sentence.

On March 14, 2014, Carruth's post-conviction appeal was denied by the Alabama Court of Criminals Appeals.

On September 20, 2022, Carruth lost his appeal to the United States District Court for the Middle District of Alabama.

On March 1, 2024, Carruth's appeal was dismissed by the 11th Circuit Court of Appeals.

=== Brooks ===
On June 30, 2006, after hearing Jimmy Brooks's appeal, the Alabama Court of Criminals Appeals overturned one of his capital murder convictions (capital murder during a robbery), but nonetheless upheld Brooks's death sentences and his remaining three capital murder convictions (during kidnapping, of a child under age 14 and during burglary).

On July 10, 2020, the Alabama Court of Criminal Appeals dismissed Brooks's post-conviction appeal.

== Aftermath ==
The murder of Brett Bowyer was widely regarded as one of the most heinous murders to occur in East Alabama.

In 2016, true-crime channel Investigation Discovery re-enacted the murder of Bowyer and also the double murder of Thurman and Katherine Ratliff.

A February 2021 report included both Jimmy Brooks and Michael Carruth on the list of 167 prisoners incarcerated on death row in Alabama.

== See also ==
- Capital punishment in Alabama
- List of death row inmates in the United States § Alabama
