= Joseph Clarence Smith Jr. =

American convicted murderer and serial rapist (born 1949)

- Mugshot of Smith Jr.
- Born: June 15, 1949 (age 77); Arizona, U.S.
- Convictions: First-degree murder (2 counts); Rape (3 counts); Attempted murder; Kidnapping
- Penalty: Death

Details
- Victims: 2 murder victims 3+ rape victims
- Date: 1973–1976
- Location: Arizona

Joseph Clarence Smith Jr. (born June 15, 1949) is a serial rapist and murderer sentenced to death in Arizona for two murders. Between December 1975 and January 1976, while he was out on parole for a 1973 rape case, Smith kidnapped, raped and killed two teenage hitchhikers, 18-year-old Sandy Spencer and 14-year-old Neva Lee, and he also committed several more rapes. Smith was caught, found guilty and sentenced to death for the murders of Spencer and Lee. Currently, Smith remains on death row at the Tucson State Prison, and he is the longest-serving death row prisoner held in Arizona.

== Background ==
Joseph Clarence Smith Jr. was born in Arizona on June 15, 1949. Although details of his early life were sparse, Smith had a lengthy criminal history, culminating into serial rape and murder.

In 1973, at the age of 24, Smith and his then 18-year-old wife picked up an 18-year-old female hitchhiker from New Mexico, and brought her to their home, where Smith raped the girl with the help of his wife. The couple were later arrested and charged with two counts of rape, but in the end, the charges against Smith's wife were dismissed, while Smith was sentenced to concurrent prison terms of one year with five years of probation on February 17, 1974. Smith's wife divorced him while he was still in prison, and five months into his sentence, Smith was granted temporary release on a half-day work furlough until he was eventually released.

== Serial rape and murder spree (1975–1976) ==
Between late 1975 and early 1976, in Phoenix, Arizona, while still on probation for the 1973 rape case, Joseph Smith Jr. committed a series of rapes and abductions, which included the murders of two girls, aged 14 and 18 respectively.

=== Murder of Sandy Spencer ===
On December 30, 1975, Smith first killed 18-year-old Sandy Spencer, whose body was found on December 31, 1975. Before her death, Spencer was last seen hitchhiking home after she completed her work shift at a fast food restaurant. She encountered Smith on her way back home, and boarded his car. Smith drove Spencer to a desert located in northwest Phoenix, and tied up her hands and feet. Smith also forcibly shoved the dirt into Spencer's mouth and nostrils before taping her mouth shut. Spencer was thus suffocated to death.

Even after Spencer died, Smith stabbed Spencer with a knife several times to ensure that she was dead. When her body was discovered, Spencer had a total of 19 stab wounds on the vaginal area while three more knife wounds were found on the breasts. Autopsy reports showed that Smith likely raped Spencer before her death, as a vaginal tear was found. A 2-inch long sewing needle was also found embedded on the breast of Spencer.

=== Murder of Neva Lee ===
On January 30, 1976, 14-year-old Neva Lee became the second victim to be murdered by Smith. Sources revealed that Lee, who was of mixed Caucasian and Chinese descent, reportedly ran away from home on January 21, 1976, and it was presumed that she was still alive on January 30, 1976, before she was killed.

After encountering Smith, Lee boarded Smith's car and was taken to another desert location in Phoenix, where she was raped and killed. Like Spencer, Lee was also tied up and had dirt forced into her nostrils and mouth before Smith taped her mouth up, and this led to her death from suffocation. After murdering Lee, Smith inserted needles in her breasts and also stabbed Lee several times on the chest, abdomen, and breasts. Lee's body was eventually found on February 2, 1976.

During an interview about her daughter's death, Lee's mother — who had previously been married to Lee's biological father in China — said that her daughter was not in the habit of hitchhiking, and she was not sure if the killer met Lee that way. Born in Shanghai, Lee had two brothers and a sister and had left school shortly before she was murdered.

=== Suspected other murders ===
Prior to the murders of Spencer and Lee, there were reported discoveries of six women found murdered in desert areas of Phoenix since 1971, and these six prior cases shared striking similarities with the killings of Lee and Spencer, and some of the victims were also hitchhikers like Lee and Spencer. The police revealed that the manner of death became increasingly violent in each case, and before the arrest of Smith, it was speculated that a psychopathic sexual predator was responsible for these eight deaths.

=== Rape incidents ===
Apart from the murders of Lee and Spencer, Smith had also committed several rapes, two of which were detailed in court documents. One case happened in February 1975, when a 17-year-old pregnant girl was picked up by Smith while hitchhiking back home from her friend's house. Smith reportedly took her to an isolated desert area and therefore raped and sodomized her. The victim survived the attack.

In July 1975, Smith and another man named David Michael Miles picked up a 15-year-old girl while she was hitchhiking. Smith and Miles forcibly took her to an isolated location and raped her. Aside from this, the girl was stabbed by Smith and Miles, but she survived the attack.

== Trial process ==
=== Arrest ===
On February 29, 1976, Joseph Smith Jr. picked up a woman after he offered her a ride to his father's workplace, claiming he wanted to show her a race car. After arriving at the location, Smith refused the request of the woman to leave, and assaulted her. Immediately after this, police officers arrived at the scene to arrest Smith on charges of false imprisonment and assault. The woman was actually an undercover police officer Donna Crowe, who took part in an operation to arrest the alleged killer responsible for the murders of Neva Lee and Sandy Spencer and several other unsolved deaths in the deserts of Phoenix.

=== Rape trial ===
Prior to standing trial for murder, Smith was first charged and tried for some of the rape cases he committed between 1975 and 1976. On August 9, 1976, Smith was found guilty of raping the 17-year-old pregnant victim back in February 1975.

On September 7, 1976, Smith was sentenced to 75 years to life for rape, as well as five years to life and ten years to life for assault on both counts. These three life sentences were ordered to run consecutively, leading to a total aggregate sentence of 90 years to life for Smith.

After his sentencing for the February 1975 rape case, Smith was charged and set to be tried for the July 1975 rape of a 15-year-old girl. On March 11, 1977, David Michael Miles, Smith's accomplice in the July 1975 rape case, pleaded guilty to rape after reaching a plea agreement with the prosecution.

On May 5, 1977, Smith was found guilty of attempted murder, kidnapping and rape on all three counts for the July 1975 rape case.

On June 27, 1977, Smith was sentenced to consecutive jail terms of 40 to 99 years (attempted murder), 60 to 99 years (rape) and life (kidnapping). In total, Smith's aggregate sentence was close to 300 years in prison for these three charges.

=== Murder trials ===
While he was serving his life sentence for rape, Smith was charged with the murders of Neva Lee and Sandy Spencer on November 1, 1976. The prosecution planned to seek the death penalty for Smith.

In early June 1977, Smith was officially put to trial for the murder of Neva Lee, while the other charge of killing Sandy Spencer was set to be assessed in another trial. During the proceedings, Smith had applied at one point for his trial to be declared a mistrial and moved it to another county. However, the motion was denied. The defence also argued during the proceedings that their client was innocent and accused the prosecution of manipulating the evidence to incriminate Smith.

On June 17, 1977, after a trial lasting six days, Smith was found guilty of the first-degree murder of Neva Lee, and the sentencing was scheduled for July 18, 1977. Smith's lawyer expressed that Smith would appeal against his conviction on the grounds of prosecutorial misconduct.

After his conviction for Lee's murder, Smith stood trial a second time for the murder of Sandy Spencer on July 6, 1977. During the trial itself, the prosecution adduced evidence that linked Smith to the killing, which centered around a brown leather jacket belonging to Spencer. It was revealed that after killing Spencer, Smith had stolen the jacket, which was passed on to a former girlfriend of Smith, who wore it on a date despite Smith's reminder to not wear it, and Smith, reportedly angered by this, later informed her that someone was killed for the jacket.

On July 7, 1977, the second day of his trial, Smith pleaded guilty to the killing of Spencer. However, several weeks after pleading guilty, Smith attempted to withdraw his plea of guilt by claiming that he was innocent but only wanted to "save others the trouble" with the guilty plea and was under emotional distress at the time he entered the plea.

On August 31, 1977, Smith was sentenced to death via the gas chamber by Superior Court Judge Robert Corcoran for both counts of murdering Sandy Spencer and Neva Lee.

== Death row ==
As of January 1, 2003, Joseph Smith Jr. was listed among the 122 prisoners incarcerated on Arizona's death row.

A 2014 report listed Smith as one of 113 inmates held on death row in Arizona.

As of 2021, Smith was one of 114 inmates on Arizona's death row. As of October 2022, Smith was one of 111 prisoners remaining on Arizona's death row.

=== Rape conviction appeals ===
On September 16, 1977, the Arizona Supreme Court rejected the appeal of Joseph Smith Jr. against his August 1976 rape conviction.

On July 26, 1979, the Arizona Supreme Court allowed the appeal of Smith against his 1976 conviction of raping and stabbing one of his 15-year-old victims, after it ruled that the trial court did not allow some witnesses to testify in his August 1976 rape trial, which warranted a re-trial.

=== Death sentence appeals ===
On July 13, 1979, the Arizona Supreme Court allowed the appeal of Smith against his death sentence and ordered a re-sentencing trial, but they upheld the double murder convictions.

On November 7, 1979, at the end of his re-sentencing trial, Smith was once again sentenced to death for the murders of Neva Lee and Sandy Spencer.

On December 7, 1981, the Arizona Supreme Court dismissed Smith's second appeal against his death sentence.

On August 31, 1999, Smith's death sentence was overturned by the 9th U.S. Circuit Court of Appeals, and his case was remanded back to the lower courts for a second re-sentencing trial.

In May 2004, Smith was sentenced to death a third time for killing both Sandy Spencer and Neva Lee.

On May 31, 2007, the Arizona Supreme Court dismissed Smith's appeal against his latest death sentences.

On October 15, 2007, the U.S. Supreme Court dismissed the appeal of Smith, dismissing his claim that it would be unconstitutional to execute him after holding him on death row for more than 30 years.

On May 27, 2016, the 9th U.S. Circuit Court of Appeals dismissed Smith's appeal against his death sentence.

On April 24, 2017, the U.S. Supreme Court dismissed Smith's appeal.

On January 23, 2018, Smith's appeal was denied by the U.S. Supreme Court.

On November 16, 2021, Smith's petition for post-conviction relief was rejected by the 9th U.S. Circuit Court of Appeals.

On May 23, 2022, the U.S. Supreme Court dismissed Smith's final appeal.

== See also ==
- Capital punishment in Arizona
- List of death row inmates in the United States § Arizona
