= Murder of Kazue Perron =

1997 carjacking and murder of a Japanese woman in Florida

- Location: West Palm Beach, Florida, United States
- Date: November 14, 1997
- Attack type: Kidnapping; Carjacking; Murder by shooting
- Weapon: Handgun
- Victims: Kazue Perron, 44
- Verdict: Guilty
- Convictions: First-degree murder
- Sentence: Philmore; Death (July 21, 2000); Spann; Death (June 23, 2000)
- Convicted: Lenard Philmore, 20; Anthony Spann, 23

On November 14, 1997, in West Palm Beach, Florida, 44-year-old Kazue Perron (1954 – November 14, 1997), a Japanese national, was kidnapped by two men, Anthony Antonio Spann (born February 12, 1974) and Lenard James Philmore (born October 25, 1976), and forcibly taken to a remote location in Martin County, where she was murdered by her abductors. Perron's body was abandoned at a canal, and after the murder, both Philmore and Spann used the victim's car as their getaway vehicle in a robbery, and this led to the police connecting both men to Perron's disappearance and murder. Both Spann and Philmore were found guilty of murdering Perron, and sentenced to death in separate trials. As of 2026, the pair remains on death row awaiting their executions.

== Murder ==
On November 14, 1997, a 44-year-old Japanese woman was abducted by two men in West Palm Beach, Florida, and later murdered in Martin County.

The victim, Kazue Perron, whose birth name was Kazue Iwasaki (いわさき かずえ), originally came from Ube, Japan, and she first came to the United States in the mid-1980s. In an unknown year, Perron married her French-born husband Jean Claude Perron, and subsequently took on his surname. In 1994, the couple moved to West Palm Beach. According to her friends, Perron practiced natural-healing techniques, such as the laying of hands. One of them, James Mihori, who first befriended Perron in a local Japanese-American association, described her as a very good gardener who was "quiet, but not shy", and also liked tea ceremony, flower arrangements and other activities typically favoured by Japanese women.

Perron planned to visit a friend, with whom she intended to run errands. However, just as Perron entered the friend's driveaway, two men, 21-year-old Lenard James Philmore and 23-year-old Anthony Antonio Spann, held Perron at gunpoint and forced her back into her car. Prior to the kidnapping, both Philmore and Spann hatched a plot to commit robbery in order to obtain money to go to New York, and furthermore, the pair decided to steal a car as a getaway vehicle in order to facilitate the robbery. A day before the kidnapping, the duo had robbed a pawnshop and stole four guns and $300 in total. Furthermore, Spann was also a fugitive wanted for the September 1997 murder of Reginald Lott, who was shot and killed during an argument over money in Tallahassee, and the police had a warrant of arrest on Spann for first-degree murder, use of a firearm during the commission of a felony and possession of a firearm by a convicted felon.

After kidnapping Perron, both Spann and Philmore drove the victim's car to an isolated location in Martin County, and Philmore pointed his gun at Perron, ordering her to get out of the car and walk to a tall brush. Perron, who supposedly began "having a fit" at that point, verbally refused and Philmore shot her once in the head, immediately killing her on the spot. After the shooting, Philmore disposed of Perron's body in a canal and together, he and Spann (who did not help throw the body) left the scene to commit the bank robbery they planned that same day.

The body of Perron was found on November 21, 1997, a week after her death, and the authorities tried to use her dental records to identify her. Shiunji Kimura, consul general from Japan based in Miami, as well as a family friend of Perron intended to help plan her funeral, and Perron's husband stated he was grateful that his wife did not suffer.

The murder of Perron was listed as one of the most high-profile murder cases to happen in Martin County in 1997.

== Charges ==
After murdering Kazue Perron, both Lenard Philmore and Anthony Spann carried out their plot to commit bank robbery, targeting a local bank in Indiantown, where the pair stole $1,000 before they escaped the scene. On the night of November 14, 1997, the same day they killed Perron, the pair were subsequently traced and arrested in an orange grove in western Martin County. As the duo made use of Perron's car as their getaway vehicle in the robbery, the police classified them as suspects behind the disappearance of Perron. Both Philmore and Spann were first charged with attempted murder and robbery in prior unrelated cases (including the bank robbery) and detained for further investigations in Perron's disappearance.

Subsequently, Philmore confessed to having carjacked Perron together with Spann, and claimed to have last seen Spann driving off with Perron, whom he claimed was still alive at that time. Philmore also led the police to the area where he stated he last saw Perron, and the police found her body in the same area. After the discovery of the body and further investigations, both men were expected to be charged with her abduction and murder in the following month.

Eventually, the police arranged a lie detector test for Philmore, who failed the test, and he confessed that he had shot and killed Perron, and that he and Spann had planned to steal a car in order to use it as a getaway vehicle in their bank robbery plot, and they also intended to kill the owner of the car, which happened to be Perron after the duo selected her as their target. Ballistics tests confirmed a handgun found in the orange grove (where both Spann and Philmore were arrested) was the murder weapon and matched to the bullet that fatally injured Perron, and the gun was stolen from a pawnshop by the duo a day prior.

On December 17, 1997, a Martin County grand jury formally indicted both Philmore and Spann for the first-degree murder of Perron, as well as carjacking, kidnapping, robbery and theft.

== Trial of Lenard Philmore ==
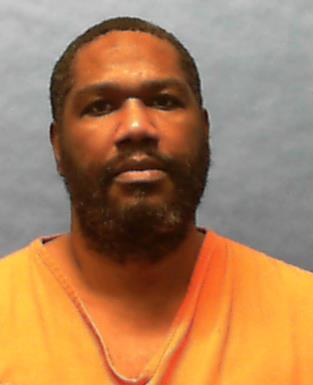
Lenard Philmore

=== Attempted murder and robbery trial ===
Before standing trial for the murder of Kazue Perron, Lenard Philmore (born October 25, 1976) was first put on trial for the multiple counts of robbery and attempted murder he faced in unrelated cases. Philmore's first trial for robbing a pawnshop (where he stole the murder weapon used in Perron's murder) began on August 12, 1998. He was found guilty on August 20, 1998, of one count of attempted murder, robbery and two counts of burglary. Philmore was sentenced to three consecutive life sentences in December 1998. Sophia Hutchins, a woman who assisted Philmore in this particular robbery, pleaded guilty to robbery and burglary and faced a potential jail term of nine to 16 years.

Philmore's second robbery trial, pertaining to the robbery at a jeweller's store in West Palm Beach, was held in April 1999, and similarly ended with his conviction that same month. Philmore was consequently sentenced a further two consecutive life terms.

=== Murder trial ===
Philmore stood trial before a Martin County jury in January 2000 for the first-degree murder of Perron. While the prosecution presented its version of events on how the killing of Perron took place, the defence tried to downplay the role of Philmore in the murder and portray him as an accomplice following what he was told, pinning the blame on Spann as the ringleader of the duo in the crime. The confession tape recording Philmore's confession to the crime was also played in court.

On January 20, 2000, the jury found Philmore guilty of all charges of first-degree murder, conspiracy to commit armed robbery, armed carjacking, kidnapping, armed robbery and grand theft.

On January 25, 2000, the sentencing trial of Philmore began, and during the hearing, Treasure Coast State Attorney Bruce Colton and Assistant State Attorney Tom Bakkedahl both argued for the death penalty for Philmore, stating that Philmore had four earlier convictions for violent crimes, and he also murdered Perron in order to eliminate witnesses and his overall motive was for financial gain, and that the death of Perron resulted from a cold blooded and premeditated murder.

On January 28, 2000, the jury unanimously recommended the death penalty for Philmore. During the final hearings before he was to be sentenced, Philmore continued to seek mercy for himself, stating that he wanted to have a second chance in life and make use of his time in prison to guide other people in similar life situations like him and aid in their rehabilitation.

On July 21, 2000, Circuit Judge Cynthia Angelos formally sentenced Philmore to death for murdering Kazue Perron.

== Trial of Anthony Spann ==
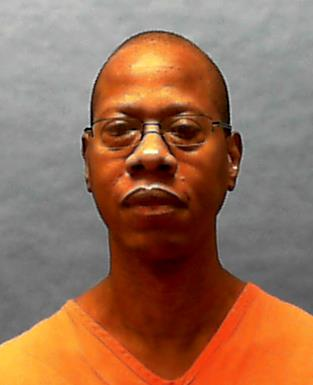
Anthony Spann

Anthony Spann (born February 12, 1974) was the second man to be put on trial for the murder of Kazue Perron on May 15, 2000. Spann's accomplice Lenard Philmore appeared in court to testify against the defendant.

Before he stood trial for the murder of Perron, Spann was already tried in court in 1999 for the murder of Reginald Lott. Spann pleaded guilty to manslaughter in midst of his trial and was therefore sentenced to 13 years in prison.

On May 24, 2000, Spann was found guilty of one count each of first-degree murder, conspiracy to commit armed robbery, armed carjacking, kidnapping, armed robbery and grand theft.

On May 25, 2000, through his lawyers, Spann asked Circuit Judge Cynthia Angelos to give him the death penalty, and further waived his right to be sentenced by the jury. Spann also instructed his counsel to not submit any mitigating evidence in his favour. The trial judge adjourned the sentencing until June 23, 2000, and ordered a pre-sentencing investigation into the background of Spann before delivering her verdict.

On June 23, 2000, Spann was formally sentenced to death for the first-degree murder of Kazue Perron.

== Appeals of the duo ==
=== Philmore ===
On April 3, 2002, Lenard Philmore filed a direct appeal to the Florida Supreme Court against his death sentence. On May 30, 2002, the Florida Supreme Court dismissed Philmore's appeal against his death sentence.

On June 15, 2006, the Florida Supreme Court rejected Philmore's petition for a writ of habeas corpus.

On July 23, 2009, the 11th Circuit Court of Appeals denied Philmore's appeal.

On March 22, 2010, the U.S. Supreme Court rejected Philmore's final appeal against his death sentence.

On January 25, 2018, the Florida Supreme Court denied Philmore's appeal for re-sentencing and affirmed his death sentence.

=== Spann ===
On April 3, 2003, Spann's direct appeal was rejected by the Florida Supreme Court.

On October 17, 2003, the Florida Supreme Court dismissed Spann's second appeal.

On July 3, 2008, the Florida Supreme Court rejected Spann's appeal.

In September 2009, Philmore appeared in a court hearing pertaining to Spann's new appeal, and he testified before Circuit Judge Burton Conner that Spann was not involved in the murder, assuming sole responsibility for the murder of Kazue Perron. Philmore stated that he was obliged to tell the truth after undergoing religious guidance in prison.

On May 24, 2012, Spann's appeal for post-conviction relief was denied by the Florida Supreme Court.

== Death row ==
As of 2018, of all the 347 inmates on Florida's death row, both Anthony Spann and Lenard Philmore were among the 12 prisoners in the list who were found guilty of murders on the Treasure Coast. By 2024, Philmore and Spann were among the seven death row inmates convicted in murder cases from the Treasure Coast.

As of 2026, both Lenard Philmore and Anthony Spann remain incarcerated on death row at the Union Correctional Institution.

== See also ==
- Capital punishment in Florida
- List of death row inmates in the United States § Florida
