= Ernesto Salgado Martinez =

American convicted murderer (born 1975)

- Martinez being arrested in Indio on August 16, 1995
- Born: November 17, 1975 (age 51); Arizona, U.S.
- Status: Incarcerated on death row in Arizona
- Convictions: Arizona: First-degree murder; Aggravated assault; Deadly assault by prisoner (2 counts); Escape (2 counts); Possessing prison contraband; Theft (2 counts); Misconduct involving weapons (2 counts); California: First-degree murder with special circumstances
- Penalty: Arizona: Death; California: Life imprisonment without parole

Details
- Victims: 2
- Date: August 15–16, 1995
- Country: United States
- States: Arizona, California
- Locations: Maricopa County, Arizona; Blythe, California
- Date apprehended: August 16, 1995
- Imprisoned at: Florence State Prison

Ernesto Salgado Martinez III (born November 17, 1975) is an American convicted murderer and death row inmate incarcerated in Arizona. A resident of California, he murdered State Trooper Robert "Bob" Martin during a traffic stop on August 15, 1995, in Maricopa County, Arizona. After murdering Martin, Martinez fled to California and committed a second murder while on the run, killing cashier Randip Singh during a robbery at a local minimart in Blythe, California.

The following day, Martinez was arrested in Indio, California, and charged in both Arizona and California. He was convicted of the murder of Martin in 1998 and sentenced to death in Arizona; in 2018, he was convicted of the murder of Singh and sentenced to life without parole in California. As of 2026, Martinez remains on death row awaiting execution.

== Murders ==
Within an eight-hour span on August 15, 1995, 19-year-old Ernesto Salgado Martinez, a California resident and former convict who was on probation, committed two murders, first killing a police officer in Arizona before he robbed and killed a minimart employee in California.

=== Bob Martin ===
The events leading up to the first murder began the previous month. In July 1995, Martinez stole a car and drove it from California to Globe, Arizona, where he intended to visit friends and family. He later traveled to Payson, Arizona, after learning that his parents had moved there. Two days before the murder, Martinez met with a friend and showed him a revolver with black electrical tape wrapped around its handle. Given that Martinez was prohibited from possessing a firearm while on probation, having the weapon constituted a violation of his probation. During the meeting, Martinez told his friend that he did not want to return to prison.

On August 15, 1995, Martinez was heading to Phoenix, Arizona and while driving on the Beeline Highway, Martinez had sped past several vehicles and motorists, and this caught the attention of 57-year-old State Trooper Robert "Bob" Martin, an officer with the Arizona Department of Public Safety (DPS), and Martin proceeded to pull over Martinez. When Martin went to the side of the car, Martinez pulled a gun and shot Martin four times and therefore murdered him on the spot. Martinez also stole Martin's .9mm SIG Sauer service weapon and fled the scene in his car.

During the escape, Martinez sped past several vehicles, attracting the attention of multiple drivers who recorded his license plate number. Among the witnesses were Steve and Susan Ball, a couple who had earlier seen Martin pull Martinez over for speeding. Shortly afterward, the Balls saw Martinez drive past their own vehicle. This raised their suspicions because only about two minutes had elapsed between the traffic stop and their second sighting of Martinez — an unusually short amount of time for Martin to have issued a speeding ticket and completed the traffic stop.

The body of Martin was found by a passing motorist shortly after he was murdered. Autopsy findings showed that of all the four gunshot wounds Martin received, one of them entered the back of his right hand and went through his palm, while another penetrated the neck near his collar bone, and a third bullet had hit the back, and was lodged in the back after it passed through his kidney, liver and diaphragm. The fourth and final bullet went into Martin's cheek and reached his skull. The head and back wounds were fatal. At the time of his death, Martin was married and had five children, and he served 27 years as a police officer for the DPS, and patrolled the Beeline Highway since 1973. According to DPS Sergeant Dave Myers, 23 DPS police officers were killed in the line of duty since 1958, and eight of them, including Martin, died by gunfire.

=== Randip Singh ===
After murdering Martin, Martinez passed by Phoenix and fled across state lines to Blythe, California. After reaching there at 4pm, Martinez contacted his aunt and asked her to transfer some money to him, but he waited two hours and his aunt did not send him the cash as he requested, and he therefore contacted her again.

After waiting for another two hours to no avail, Martinez lost his patience and decided to commit robbery. Martinez entered a local minimart and threatened the store's cashier at gunpoint. The cashier, a 43-year-old Indian immigrant named Randip Singh, was shot by Martinez, who stole all the $10 and $20 notes from the cash register. Singh left behind a wife and daughter, who were still residing in India at the time of his death, which took place about eight hours after the murder of Martin.

Blythe police sergeant Rocky Milano was the first to respond to the scene after the local authorities received a report of gunshots ringing from the minimart, and he discovered the mortally wounded Singh lying on his back, and Singh was able to give a description of his attacker to Sergeant Milano, stating that the perpetrator resembled a Mexican youth, before he was pronounced dead several hours later at a nearby hospital. Ballistics experts at the scene found a .9mm shell casing at the scene, and it matched the ammunition used in Martin's missing service weapon, which further corroborated that both Singh and Martin were killed by the same person.

== Charges ==
The following day after the murders of Officer Bob Martin and Randip Singh, Ernesto Martinez's whereabouts were traced to Indio, California, where he escaped to after killing the two victims. Martinez, who was pursued by the police, hid himself in a trailer home and became engaged in a three-hour standoff with the police before he finally surrendered, and was therefore placed under arrest for the two murders. The police also recovered the murder weapon and Martin's stolen gun.

While he was held in custody at a California jail, Martinez was charged with the murder of Martin by the Arizona authorities, and they sought to bring Martinez back to Arizona to be prosecuted first for the police officer's murder, and Maricopa County State Attorney Rick Romley expressed his intent to seek the death penalty for Martinez, who faced a potential sentence of death or life imprisonment for the crime. A funeral for Martin was held on August 19, 1995, and more than 1,000 state police officers, family members and friends attended the funeral.

An extradition order was issued for Martinez after his arrest, but he filed an appeal to challenge the ruling, which effectively delayed the extradition process. Eventually, Martinez was sent back to Arizona to formally face trial, and on September 18, 1995, a Maricopa County grand jury formally indicted Martinez on one count of first-degree murder and two count each of theft and misconduct with weapons, and the prosecution filed an official notice to seek the death penalty.

On August 26, 1997, Riverside County Deputy District Attorney Ron Lorden, whose office handled the case of Singh's murder, confirmed that Martinez would stand trial in both California and Arizona for both murders, but his trial in Arizona would proceed first before the California authorities could try him for the murder of Singh.

== Murder trial in Arizona ==
On September 7, 1997, Ernesto Martinez officially stood trial for the murder of Officer Bob Martin.

During the trial, the prosecution summoned several witnesses to prove that Martinez was responsible for the fatal shooting of Martin. A friend of Martinez, Eric Moreno, stated that during a phone conversation, Martinez bragged to him about shooting a police officer and laughed about it. Several motorists and the couple who witnessed him fleeing the crime scene were summoned to testify in court as well. The prosecution contended that Martinez shot Martin because he wanted to avoid going to jail and he still refused to assume responsibility for this crime, although the defence argued that the prosecution's case was based on pure speculation and the witnesses had wrongly identified Martinez as the killer.

On September 27, 1997, the jury found Martinez guilty of first-degree murder for the killing of Martin.

On August 18, 1998, Martinez was sentenced to death by Maricopa County Judge Christopher Skelly.

== Second murder trial in California ==
=== Extradition to California and pre-trial process ===
In 2010, 15 years after the murder of Randip Singh, Ernesto Martinez was extradited back to his native state of California from Arizona and faced a charge of first-degree murder for the killing of Singh, and was held in the Riverside County Jail while awaiting trial for Singh's murder.

On May 19, 2015, Riverside County District Attorney Mike Hestrin announced that his office would continue pursuing the death penalty for Martinez. Under California state law, the offence of first-degree murder under certain aggravating circumstances warranted the death penalty or life imprisonment without the possibility of parole.

During his pre-trial detention, Martinez gradually rose to become one of the most dangerous inmates held in Riverside County. In 2011, about a year after Martinez was returned to California, he stabbed a fellow prisoner 50 times and this led to him being charged with attempted murder and subsequent solitary confinement, and he also tricked a county judge into appointing his mistress as his paralegal. Martinez additionally spent his time in prison studying law, and given his high IQ of 120, Martinez was able to accumulate a lot of knowledge about law to sometimes act as his own lawyer and even secured legal delays to his case. He was caught with a shank hidden inside his prison cell in March 2017. He was also caught making unmonitored calls from prison by exploiting a loophole for over a four-year period until September 2017. The level of dangerousness was so severe that in each and every court appearance, Martinez had to be shackled and cuffed during his pre-trial hearings, although this was prohibited for trial proceedings, and the authorities considered making Martinez wear a shock sleeve to keep him in line, before they decided to call off the plan.

In June 2015, Martinez requested that his trial venue be changed from Riverside County to Indio, California. The request was rejected in July 2015.

In February 2017, Martinez was set to defend himself in his upcoming murder trial for the killing of Singh, which was expected to last for six months in a Riverside County trial court.

=== Trial process ===
In October 2017, 22 years after he committed the crime, Martinez officially stood trial for the 1995 murder of Randip Singh and the 2011 attempted murder of an inmate he stabbed in the Riverside County Jail, and he represented himself in court, delivering his opening statement and arguments against the prosecution's case.

In his closing argument, prosecutor Chris Cook argued that Ernesto Martinez killed Randip Singh during his escape after killing an Arizona police officer. He said the evidence, including a bullet casing found at the mini-mart, connected Martinez to Singh's murder, since Martinez fired a shot with the officer's stolen gun and it therefore killed Singh. Cook also argued that Martinez's attack on his cellmate in 2011 was not self-defense but a deliberate and violent attack. Martinez, who defended himself, argued that the evidence against him was weak and that witnesses had changed their stories. He told the jury to focus on the Singh murder rather than the Arizona case, for which he had already been convicted. He claimed the prosecution was using the Arizona evidence to strengthen a case that otherwise lacked proof.

On December 4, 2017, Martinez was found guilty of the murder of Singh. Furthermore, the jury found that there were special circumstances present in the offence committed, mainly the killing of multiple persons and the element of a robbery-murder case, which made Martinez eligible for a possible death sentence under California law. However, he was acquitted of the charge of attempted murder for the 2011 stabbing of another inmate, after he claimed that he did so in self-defence.

On March 1, 2018, the jury recommended life without parole for Martinez, sparing him a second death sentence. His formal sentencing was scheduled for April 27, 2018.

On April 27, 2018, Riverside County Superior Court Judge Charles Koosed sentenced Martinez to life without parole for the murder of Randip Singh. After his sentencing, Martinez was scheduled to return to Arizona, where he would continue his incarceration on the state's death row.

== Appeals against death sentence ==
Over the following years after he was condemned to die, Ernesto Martinez filed multiple appeals against his death sentence for Officer Bob Martin's murder in Arizona, even during the period when he was extradited and held in California for the murder of Randip Singh.

On May 11, 2000, the Arizona Supreme Court turned down Martinez's direct appeal against his death sentence.

On October 11, 2000, the U.S. Supreme Court rejected Martinez's appeal and confirmed his death sentence.

On June 18, 2019, the 9th Circuit Court of Appeals dismissed Martinez's appeal for a new trial over Martin's murder.

On May 16, 2022, Martinez lost his appeal to the 9th Circuit Court of Appeals.

On January 9, 2023, Martinez's final petition for a writ of certiorari was denied by the U.S. Supreme Court.

As of August 2025, Martinez was one of 109 inmates remaining on Arizona's death row.

== State's motion for execution date ==
On September 1, 2026, the Arizona Attorney General Kris Mayes filed a motion seeking an execution date for Ernesto Martinez, and requested that his sentence should be carried out in January 2027 at the earliest.

In response to the state's filing, the defence argued that the state was rushing to schedule their client's execution, especially since Mayes was nearing her re-election bid in November 2026. At that point, Martinez was one of 25 condemned inmates from Arizona who exhausted all avenues of appeal.

On November 12, 2026, in a court filing, Attorney General Mayes sought an execution date of January 27, 2027, for Martinez.

== Aftermath ==
In April 1996, a year after the murder of Bob Martin, the Beeline Highway was renamed as Duthie-Martin Highway to commemorate both Officer Bob Martin and another officer, Gilbert Duthie, who were killed in the line of duty and died on the highway. Duthie was not murdered, but died in 1970 after his patrol car got off the road and fell into a nearby creek while he was attempting to assess the flood damage.

In a 2015 interview, Martin's widow told the press that she was concerned by the fact that Martinez was legally maneuvering the process to ensure his execution be delayed as long as possible, and she stated that the prolonged legal process had also tested her deep-seated faith in the criminal justice system. In spite of these developments, Martin's widow affirmed that Martinez should be executed for the murder of her late husband, although she said she would not attend the execution as a witness, reason being she was more focused on finding peace and closure and anticipated the conclusion of the whole process.

Three decades after the murder of Martin, AZ Troopers Association President Jeff Hawkins stated that the victim was a pillar of the community and his death left an impact even on those who did not know him. A former juror who convicted Martinez and voted for the death sentence back in 1998 stated that the jury found him guilty since the evidence was very overwhelming against the defendant, and he admitted that Martinez's prolonged stay on death row made him reconsider his stance towards the death penalty, given that the sentence was not carried out after decades and it rang "hollow" in such a context.

== See also ==
- Capital punishment in Arizona
- List of death row inmates in the United States § Arizona
