= Johnny Francis Grant =

Métis trader and cattle rancher (1831-1907)

Johnny Grant
- Born: January 7, 1831; Fort Edmonton, Canada
- Died: May 1, 1907 (aged 76); Alberta, Canada
- Other name: John Grant
- Occupations: trader, cattle rancher, land speculator
- Partner(s): Quarra, approx, 7 others
- Children: 26

Johnny Francis Grant (1831-1907), known as Johnny Grant, was a French-Canadian Métis who became a trader and a major cattle rancher in Montana. He was born at Fort Edmonton, Alberta, Canada. Grant's father, Richard Grant, originally from Montreal, worked for the Hudson's Bay Company. His mother, Ann Breland, was Métis, the daughter of a Company employee, and closely related to Pascal Breland and Cuthbert Grant Jr., both well-known Métis people. She died when Johnny Grant was about three years old, after which he and his siblings were sent to Trois-Rivières, Quebec, where they were raised by their grandmother. After that, Richard Grant moved to the Company's outpost at Fort Hall (in present-day Idaho). In his teens, young Grant left for Idaho Territory to meet up with his father. By the 1840s the fur trade was declining, so Grant and his brothers turned to trading with emigrants traveling west along the Oregon Trail. Richard Grant had earned considerable profits by trading travelers one healthy cow or horse for two trail-wearied ones, a practice that Johnny also adopted. He then fed and rested the tired animals and the following season traded them to the next year's travelers. This method allowed father and son to build up large herds of livestock.

Grant started using the Deer Lodge Valley in 1857 to graze his cattle during the winter along the banks of the Clark Fork river near Cottonwood creek. Having significant conflict with his father, In 1859 he decided to permanently locate a ranch there, and finished building his permanent residence in 1862.

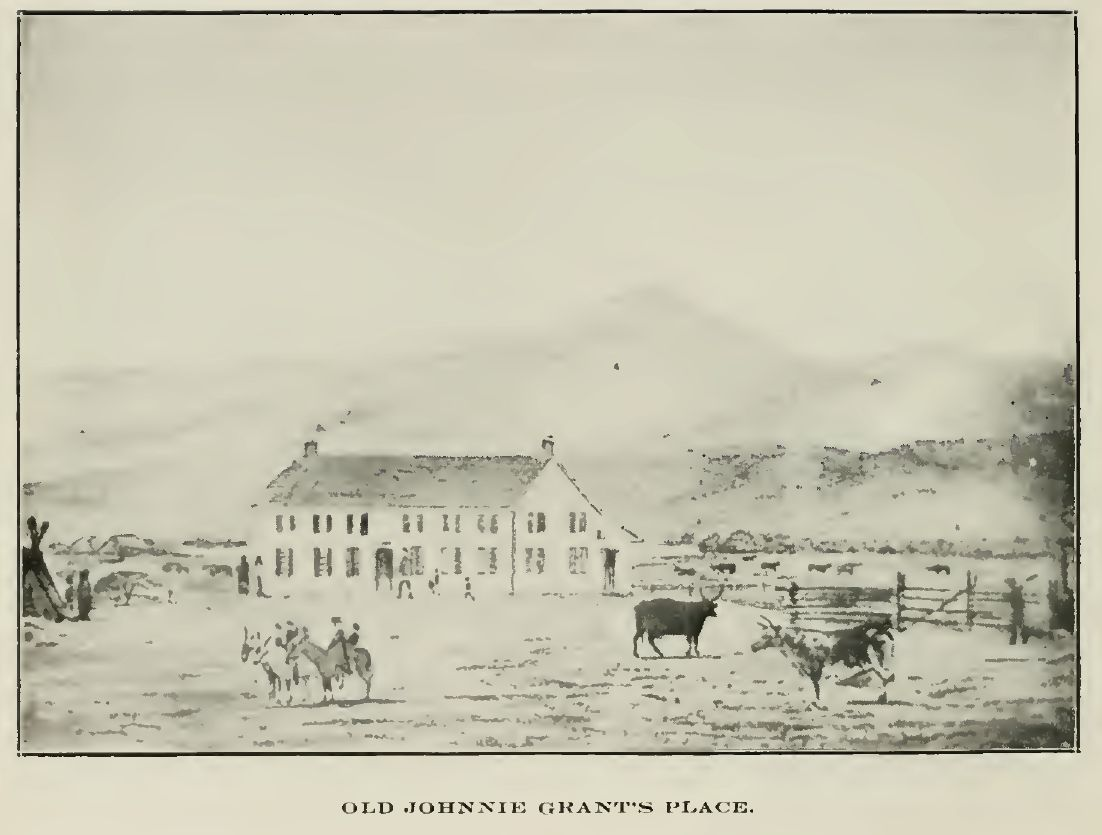
Grant's cattle ranch

He convinced other Métis people to settle around him, forming the town of Cottonwood (later to become Deer Lodge). In the settlement's early years, he was successful, but as gold mining lured more settlers to the area, he was at a disadvantage, because he spoke French as his primary language and the newcomers mostly spoke English. In addition, as white settlement increased, it became more uncomfortable for him and his family because he was polygamous, having approximately eight women as partners viewed as wives, (though at least one of his children was from a woman not accepted into the family) most of whom were Indigenous. He fathered at least 26 children and adopted several others. Grant's most respected and beloved wife, Quarra, was of the Lemhi Shoshone people on her mother's side, and her father was Bannock. Quarra Grant was also the sister of the Shoshone leader Tendoy. She died of tuberculosis in 1867.

In August 1866, Grant sold his ranch to a fellow cattleman, Conrad Kohrs, for $19,200. He and his family permanently returned to Canada in 1867. He initially settled in the Red River Valley of Manitoba, but came into disagreement with Louis Riel in 1869, when Grant sided with the Canadian government during the First Riel Rebellion. By 1892, after failing financially due to land speculation, Grant pulled up roots and moved to Alberta in 1892. There he dictated his memoirs in the final year of his life and died on May 1, 1907.

Under Kohr's ownership, the Montana ranch became the core of a major stock-breeding empire and Kohrs became a cattle baron. The core of Grant's original ranch is now included in the Grant–Kohrs Ranch National Historic Site.

== Sources ==
Grant, Johnny; Meikle, Lyndel (1996). Very close to trouble: the Johnny Grant memoir. Pullman: Washington State University Press. ISBN 0874221404.
