= Stockgrower =

A stockgrower (or stock grower) is someone who raises livestock.

Stockgrower may also refer to:

- Cowman (profession)
- Rancher
- Cattle baron

== See also ==
- Grower (disambiguation)
- Stockman (disambiguation)
- Stockgrowers association
- Lashing (ropework)#Stockgrower's lash
