= Stockmann (disambiguation) =

Stockmann is a Finnish company.

Stockmann may also refer to:

- Stockmann (surname)

Finnish department stores

- Stockmann, Helsinki centre
- Stockmann, Tapiola
- Stockmann, Turku

== See also ==
- Stockman (disambiguation)
