= Farmworker =

Performs agricultural labor

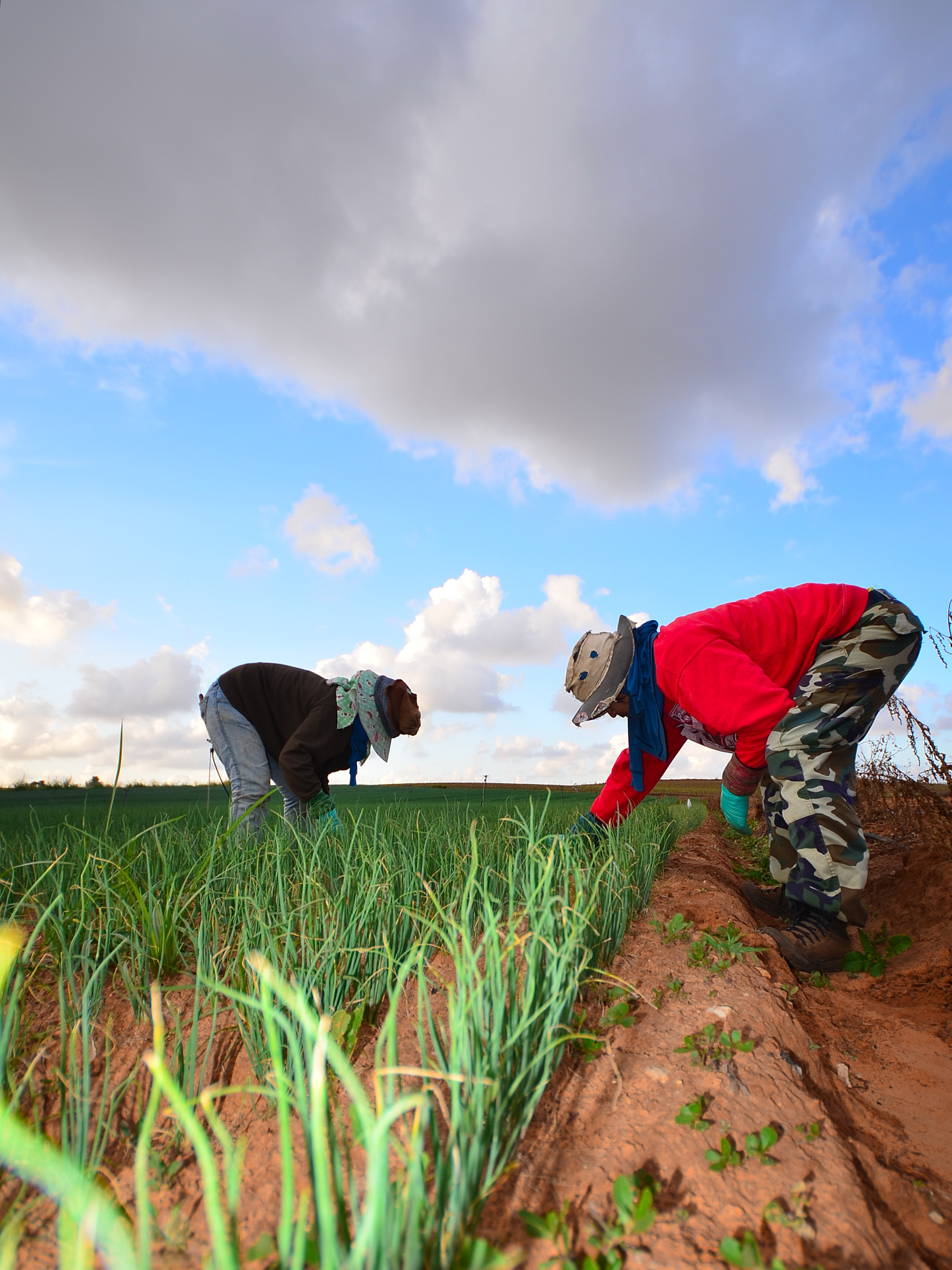
Two farm workers cleaning and picking at an onion field, location unknown

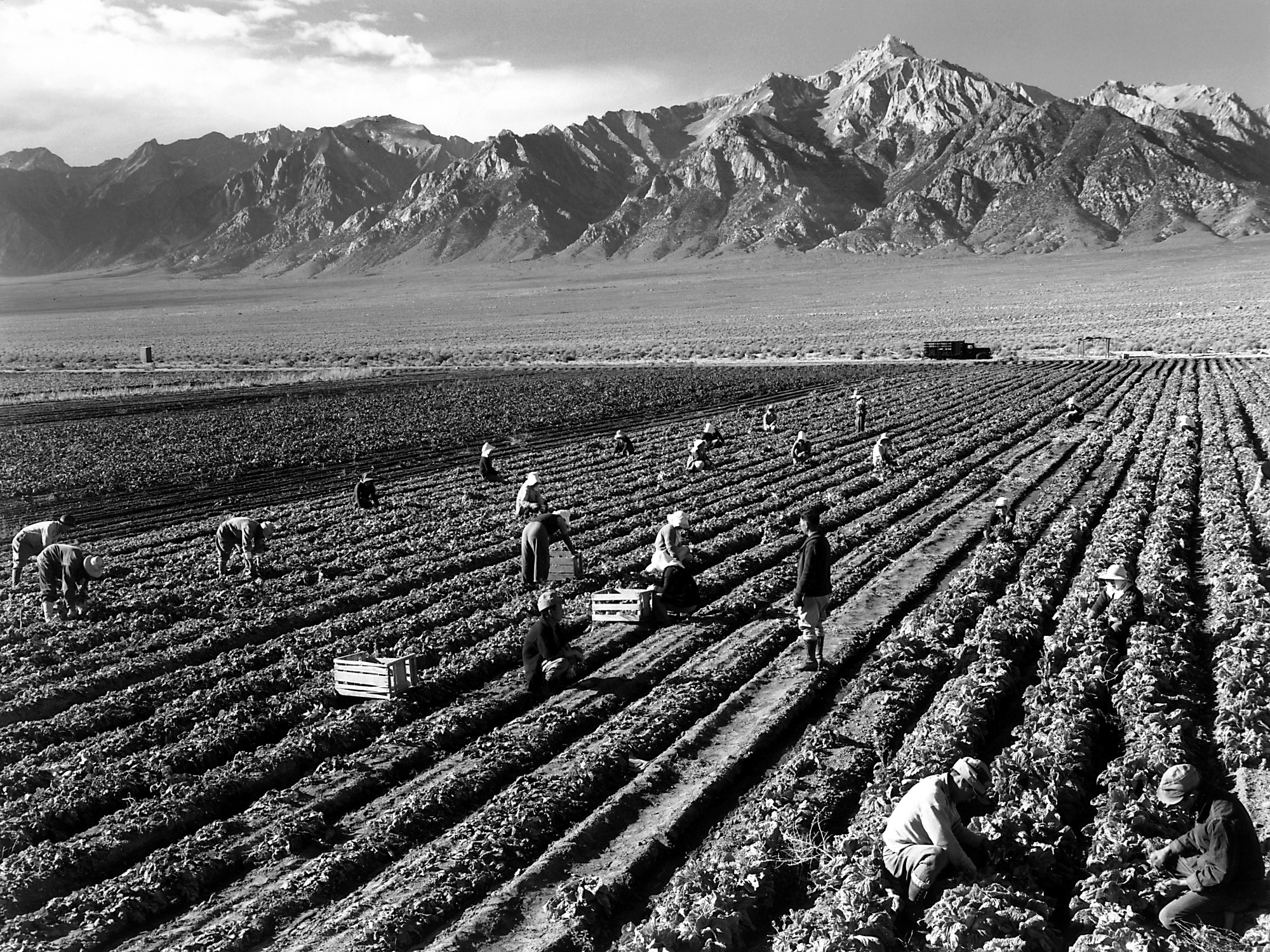
Farm workers on a field near Mount Williamson in Inyo County, California. This photograph is by Ansel Adams.

A farmworker or farmhand, is someone employed for labor in agriculture. In labor law, the term "farmworker" is sometimes used more narrowly, applying only to a hired worker involved in agricultural production, including harvesting. Agricultural work varies widely depending on context, degree of mechanization and crop. Low wages for farmworkers have been associated with farmworker shortages and delayed adoption of agricultural technology.

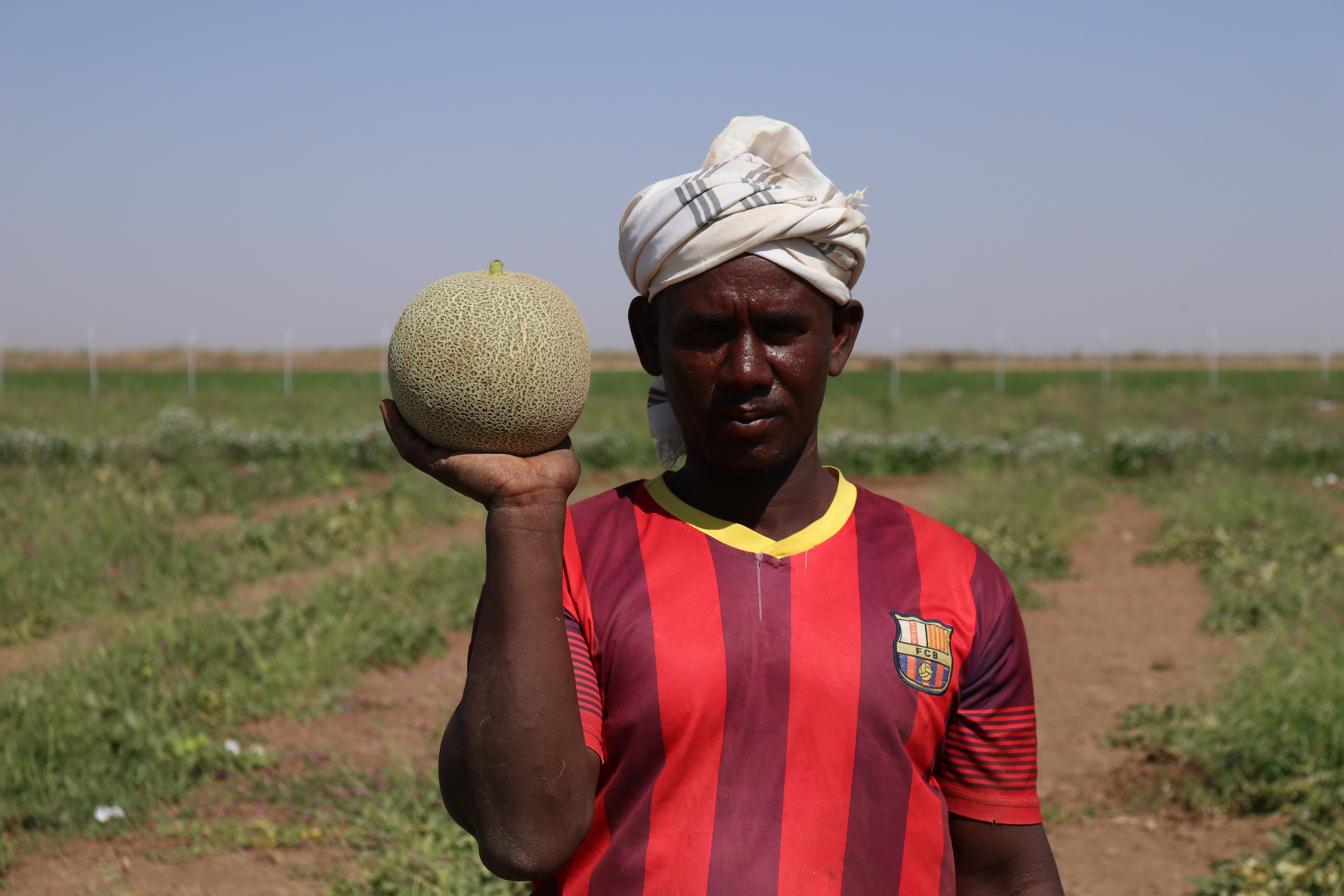
Sudanese farmer reviews cantaloupe production, south of Khartoum.

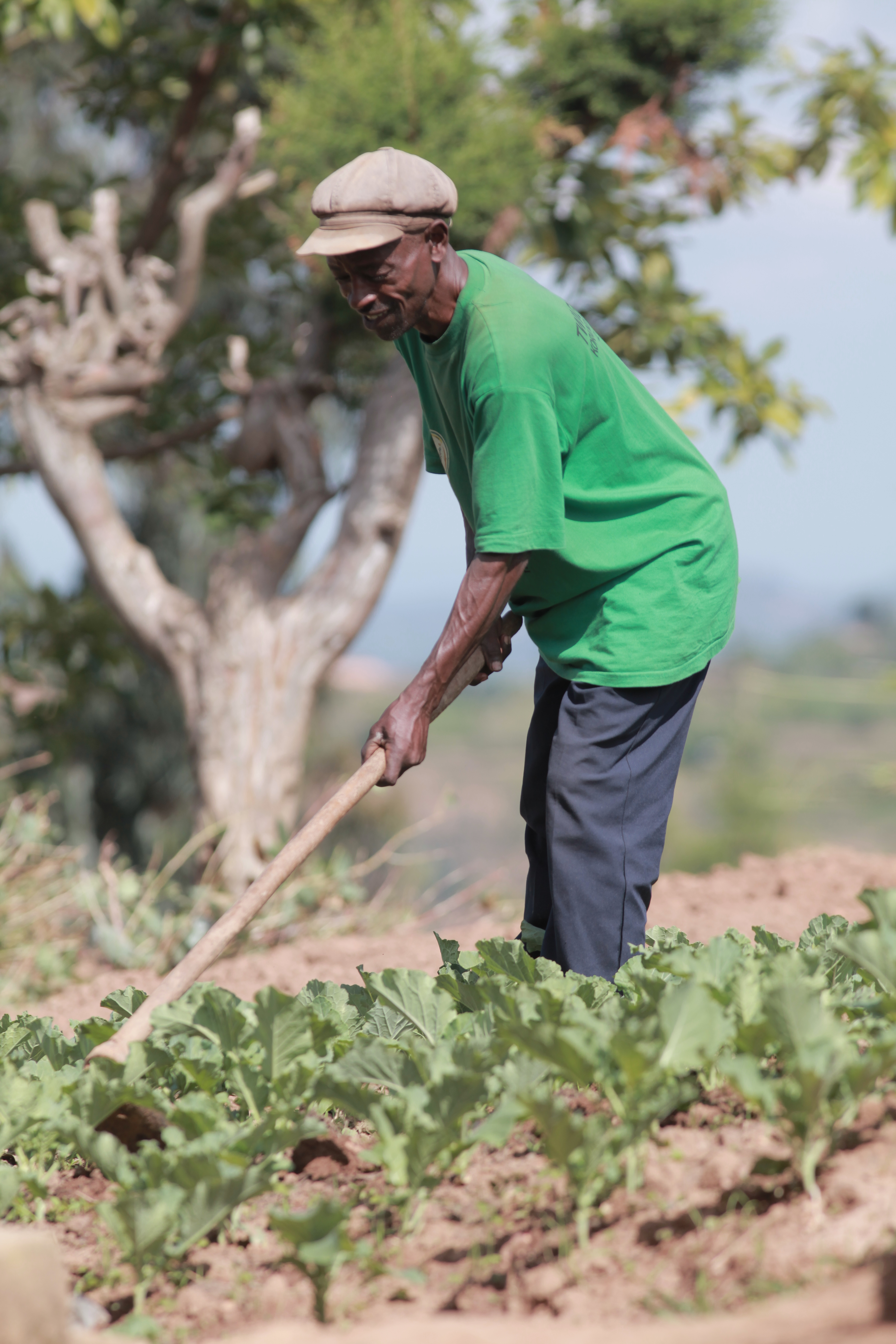
A Rwandan farmworker

Farmworkers in Nigeria making ridges

Agricultural labor is often affected by the human health impacts of environmental issues related to agriculture, such as health effects of pesticides or exposure to other health challenges such as valley fever. To address these environmental concerns and marginal working conditions, many labor rights, economic justice and environmental justice movements have been organized or supported by farmworkers.

== Worldwide ==
=== In the United States ===
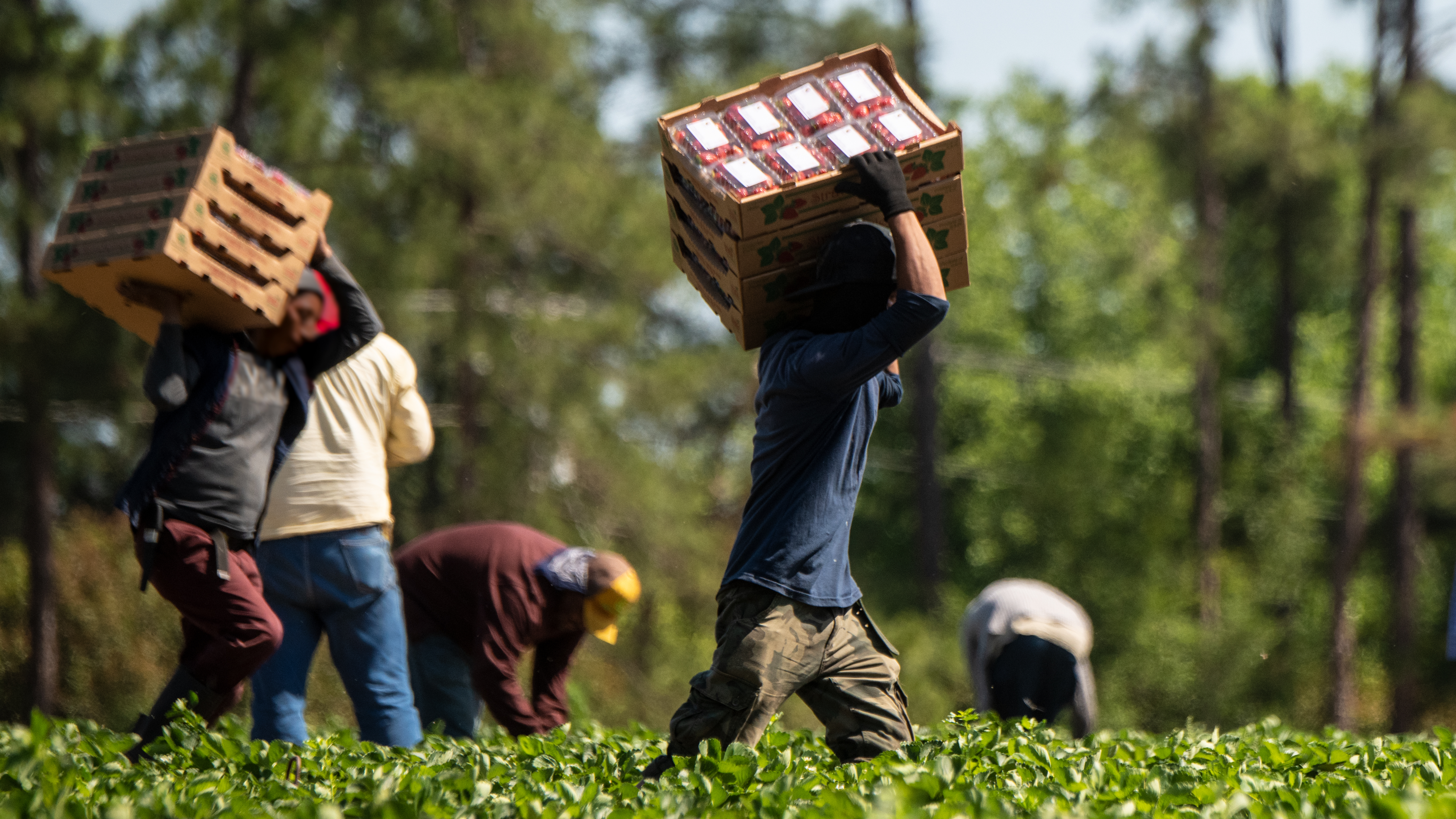
Farmworkers in Fort Valley, Georgia in 2019

Farmworkers in the United States have unique demographics, wages, working conditions, organizing, and environmental aspects. According to the National Institute for Occupational Safety and Health, approximately 2,112,626 full-time workers were employed in production agriculture in the U.S. in 2019 and approximately 1.4 to 2.1 million hired crop workers are employed annually on crop farms in the U.S. In 2025, the Department of Agriculture found the average age among farmworkers to be 39.6 years old, the average wage to be $17.23 per hour, and the average number of hours worked to be 40.8 per week.

The types of farmworkers include field crop workers, nursery workers, greenhouse workers, supervisors, etc. The Department of Labor findings for the years 2019–2020 report that 63% of crop workers were born in Mexico, 30% in the mainland United States or Puerto Rico, 5% in Central America, and 2 percent in other regions. The amount of farm labor in the United States has changed substantially: in 1870, almost 50 percent of the U.S. population was employed in agriculture; as of 2025, less than 1% of the population was directly employed in agriculture.

Potential health and safety issues that may be associated with farm work include vehicle rollovers, falls, musculoskeletal injuries, hazardous equipment, grain bins, pesticides, unsanitary conditions, and respiratory disease. According to the United States Department Of Labor, farmworkers are at risk of work-related lung diseases, noise-induced hearing loss, skin diseases, and certain cancers related to chemical use. Farm workers also suffer disproportionately from heat stress, with fewer than average seeking treatment. While some progress has been made, many farmworkers continue to struggle for fair pay, proper training, and safe working conditions.

=== In Canada ===
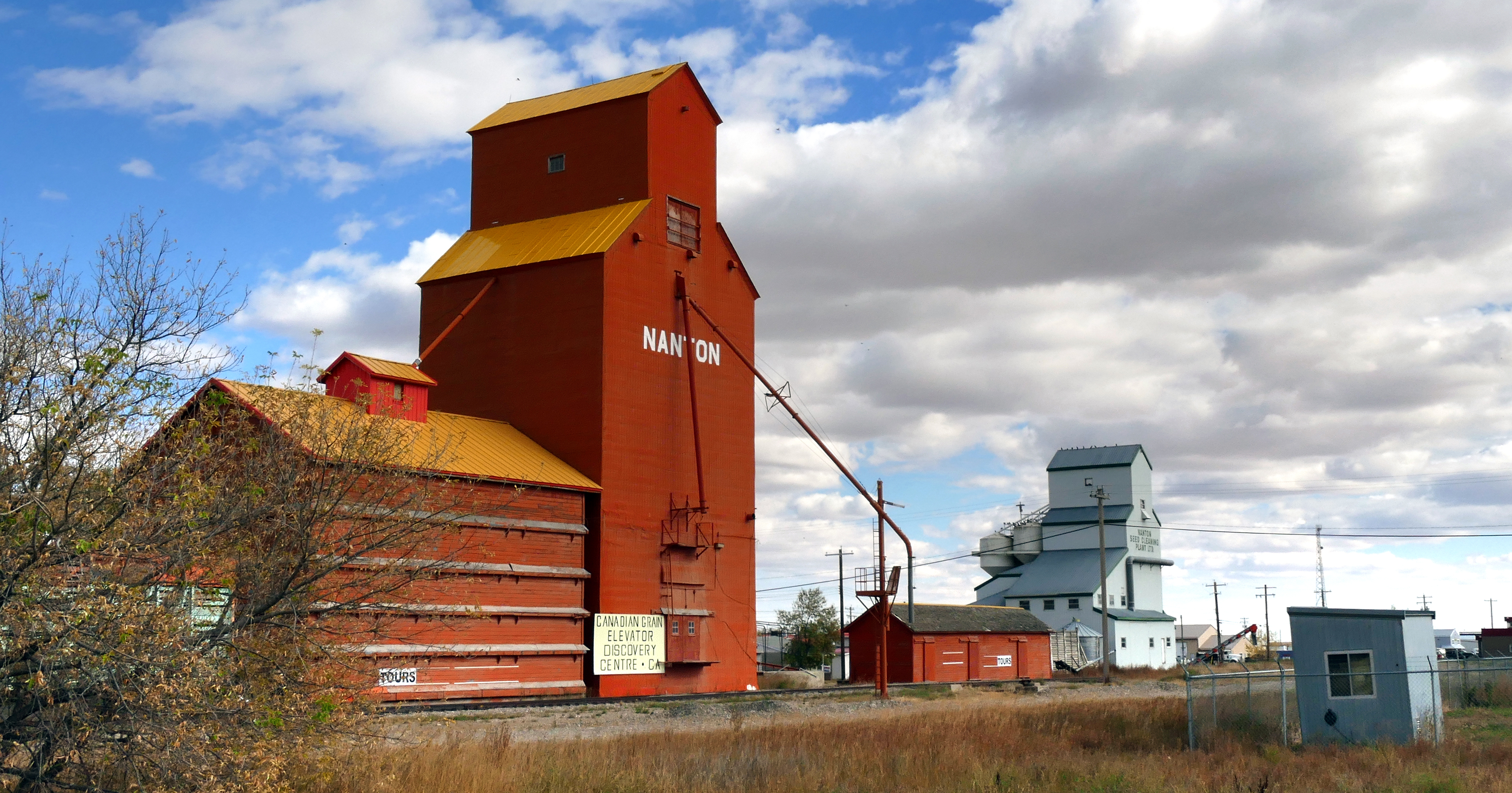
Small town in Canada with farming history and heritage

Canada as of 2010 had 297,683 agricultural employees; 112,059 were year-round and 185,624 were seasonal or temporary. Qualifying employers in Canada can hire temporary foreign farmworkers from participating countries for periods of up to 8 months per calendar year for on-farm primary agriculture in specified commodity sectors, if the work involved totals at least 240 hours within a period of 6 weeks or less. This Seasonal Agricultural Worker Program, established in 1966, brings about 25,000 foreign workers to Canada each year. About 66% of those work in Ontario, 13% in Québec, and 13% in British Columbia.

Workers in the Seasonal Agricultural Worker Program, being citizens of Mexico and various Caribbean countries, tend to be Spanish-speaking. Between 1991 and 1996, in British Columbia, the number of South Asian agricultural workers increased from 3,685 to 5,685, mostly Punjabi-speaking. Analysis published in 2000 indicated that "Of the 5,000 workers employed by the over 100 licensed Farm Labour Contractors in British Columbia, two-thirds were recent immigrants who entered Canada less than 3 years ago. Of the 700 harvest workers surveyed, 97% were Punjabi speaking" (British Columbia did not participate in the Seasonal Agricultural Workers Program until 2004.).

Many of the issues noted for farm workers in the US also apply in Canada. Analysis pertaining to Ontario noted that "All workers are eligible (with some variability) for provincial health insurance ... and workers compensation (WSIB), and are covered by provincial health and safety legislation through the Ministry of Labour, and yet [migrant farm workers] are not always able or willing to access these health and compensation services".

Every Canadian province and territory has an office that deals with labour and employment laws. A person at the local employment or labour-standards office can talk to farmworkers about fair pay, hours of work, rest periods, and working conditions, and provide other services. An employer cannot punish a farmworker for contacting an employment-standards office.

=== In Cuba ===
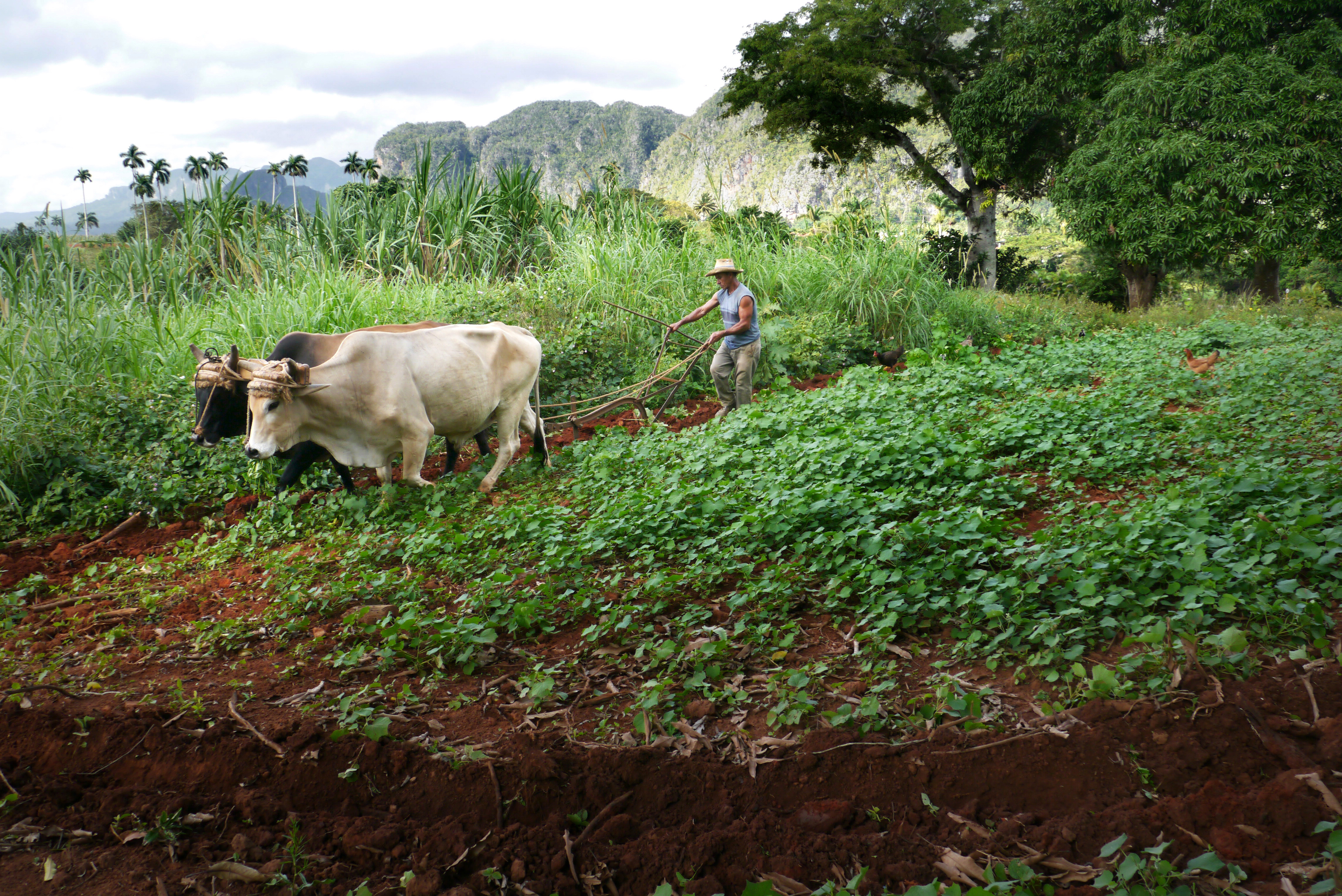
Farmer plows his field with oxen at Cuba-Vinales.

Prior to social changes in the 1960s, the all-important Cuban sugar-growing economy had an integrated rural-urban workforce—each season, town-dwellers helped to bring in the harvest. Subsequently, mechanisation ensued, causing agricultural employment to fall. In 2023, an estimated 17.1% of the Cuban workforce was employed in agriculture.

=== In Mexico ===
The Encuesta Nacionalde Empleo estimated 2.7 million agricultural workers in Mexico. About a million are migrants. There is much use of seasonal and migrant agricultural labor in northwestern Mexico, because of the considerable fruit and vegetable production occurring in that region. Rough estimates of peak seasonal labor requirements for Sinaloa, Sonora, Baja California Norte, and Sur, are 400,000 to 600,000.

Several issues, particularly low pay and harsh working conditions have been identified that pertain to some farmworkers in Mexico. Many of these issues are pursued by farmworker organizations, with resulting labor action, e.g. strikes occurring in 2015.

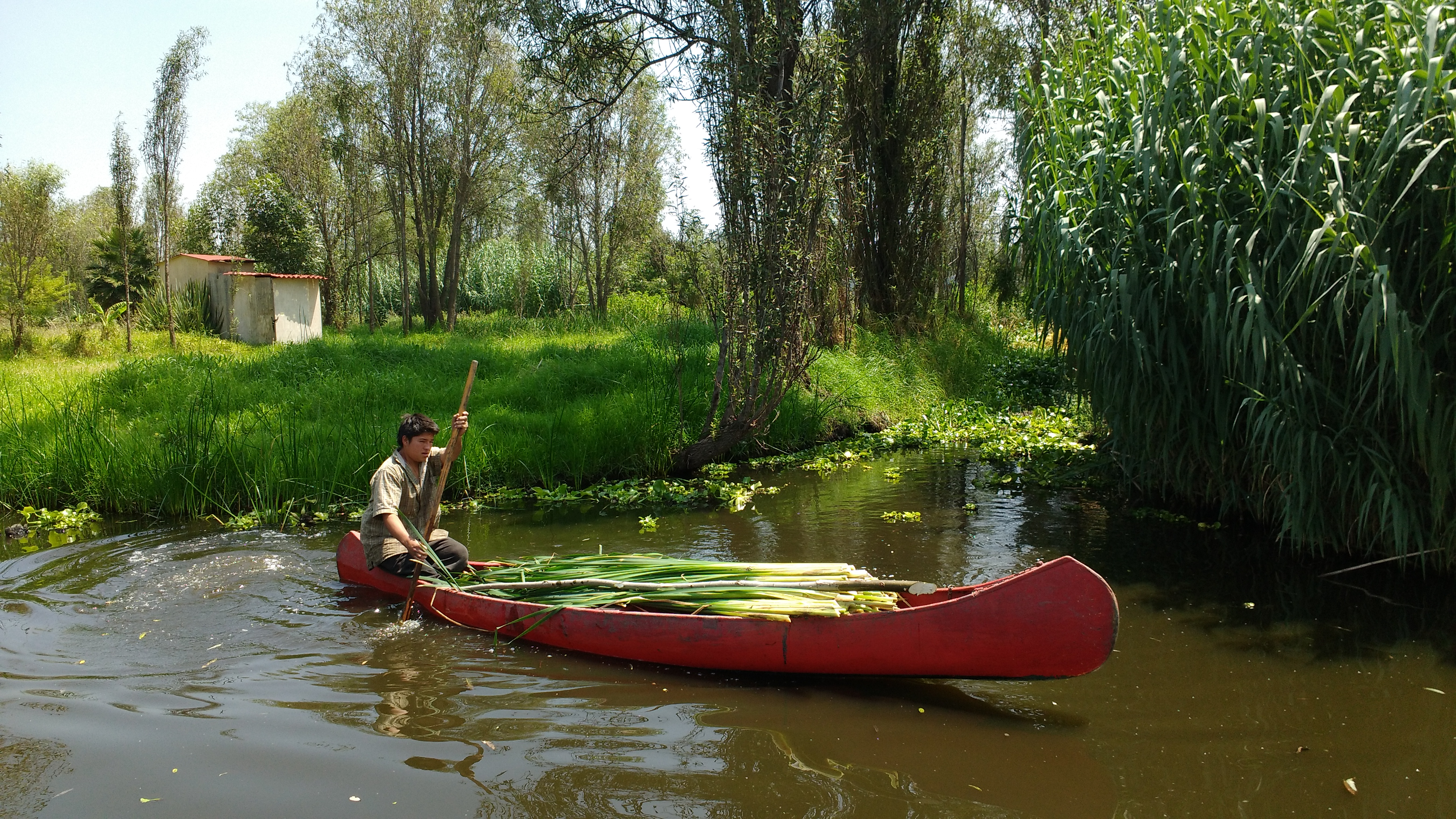
Mexican farmer on his dugout

Over the past quarter-century, water quality and pesticide issues affecting farmworkers in Mexico have been identified in peer-reviewed literature. The following examples are of interest but are not necessarily broadly representative. In the Mezquital Valley of central Mexico, in the early 1990s, about 85,000 acres were irrigated with wastewater. A study of the implications found that important outcomes were diarrheal disease and parasitic infections in farmworkers and their families. Pesticide issues were investigated in 200 farmworkers in a small area of northwestern Mexico in the 1990s. Of those workers, 59% could read at the third-grade level, few had received information about pesticides; 30% did not wear personal protective gear; and 20% had experienced acute pesticide poisoning at least once during the season investigated. A study was conducted comparing 25 farm workers engaged in pesticide spraying with a control group of 21 workers not exposed to pesticides, from the Nextipac community in Jalisco, Mexico. The exposed group showed acute poisoning in 20% of the cases.

The North American Free Trade Agreement (NAFTA), established in 1994, facilitated economic trade between the United States and Mexico. However, due to factors such as declining wages, the devaluation of the peso, and unilateral trade liberalization, production of different crops such as corn has decreased in Mexico while increasing in the United States. This was because NAFTA removed all barriers for trade including tariffs that were put into place. As a result, agricultural exports have shifted in favor of the United States. For example, corn grown in the United States is now cheaper than corn grown in Mexico, creating competition between the two countries. Before NAFTA, Mexican farmers could grow and sell corn without facing such intense competition from U.S. imports.

This major agreement has created a shift in the number of people, specifically farmers, in both countries. More people have migrated to the United States than Mexico due to the competitiveness of prices. Those people have looked elsewhere for work because there were no longer opportunities in their home country. According to data from the Institute for Agriculture and Trade Policy, “From 1992 through 2012 the U.S. lost 245,288, or 22%, of small-scale farmers (under $350,000 annual gross farm income) and 6,123, or 5% of mid-sized farmers”. In addition to having more advanced machinery, large U.S. agricultural businesses had the capital means to expand production and were heavily subsidized by the U.S. government, allowing them to outcompete Mexico’s smaller, less capitalized farms which was an imbalance that NAFTA exacerbated, contributing to the displacement of over two million Mexican farmers.

Most major farms continued to flourish while small scale farms suffered. This was mainly due to the growth of the meat and dairy industry which relied on fewer but larger scale farms to meet their needs. According to Ben Lilliston, director of Rural Strategies and Climate Change at Institute of Agriculture and Trade Policy, it is estimated that more than two million Mexican farmers closed their farms in the wake of NAFTA’s flood of U.S. imports, or as many as one-quarter of the farming population. While people from Mexico may have left agriculture, production is still the most important part of the food system, and the U.S. relies on a large portion of farmers to continue producing, many of whom are migrant workers who were previously farmers in Central Mexico. Without these workers, the U.S. food system would be placed in jeopardy.

=== In Puerto Rico ===
Puerto Rico is an island community and a territory of the United States, which makes it especially vulnerable to environmental disasters such as hurricanes—particularly for the local farmers who live and work on the island year-around. These weather events increase the level of food insecurity in the country, which is detrimental to the local farmers who call Puerto Rico home. Hurricanes that cause food insecurity can hinder the livelihoods of local farmers and their families. It is difficult to obtain culturally appropriate, healthy, local food when environmental disasters occur, causing many people, including farmers, to suffer.

For example, in 2017 Hurricane Maria caused over 69% of farmers to deal with one month or more of food insecurity, and over 38% of farmers dealt with continuing food insecurity that lasted for three months or more. According to a study done by Dr. Aníbal Ruiz-Lugo at the University of Puerto Rico, farmers with land in Puerto Rico, 43% lost their farms completely due to Hurricane Maria. Hurricane Maria affected the farmers with smaller amounts of land in rural areas, who experienced more food insecurity than those with larger amounts of land in larger, urban areas.

Hurricane Maria destroyed over 80% of the country’s agriculture, was linked to over 2,974 deaths, and caused the longest blackout in the history of the United States. After around six months, only 68% of people in Puerto Rico had received electricity again. The blackout was also detrimental to farmlands because it hindered access and transportation.

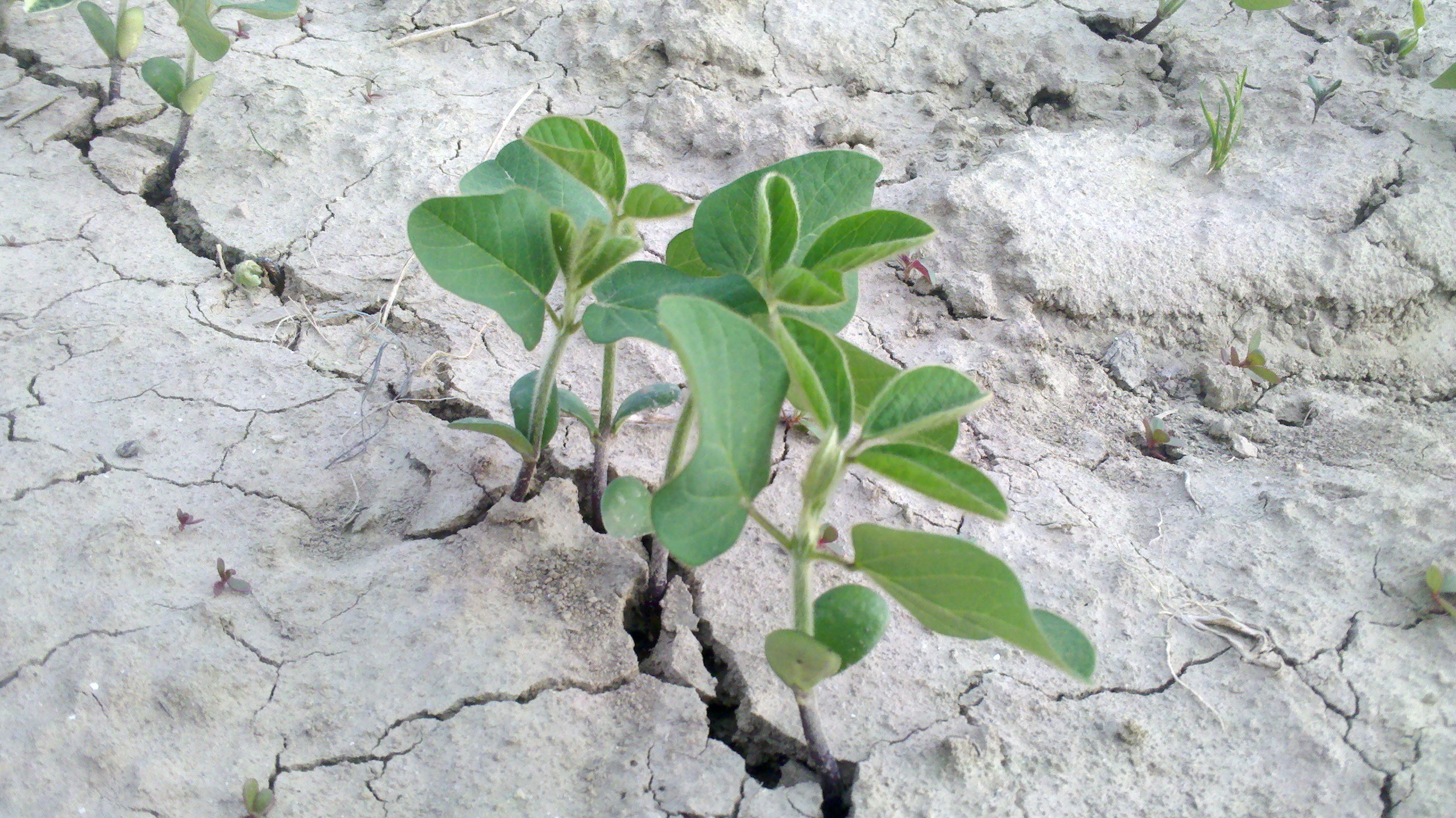
Organic soybean farm in Veneto, Italy

=== In the European Union ===
For the 27 member states of the European Union in 2009, 77 % of the overall average agricultural labor force was family members; however, in Slovakia, the Czech Republic, Bulgaria, Hungary, and Estonia, family members were not predominant in the agricultural labor force. Hired labor accounted for more than half of the total (hired plus family) labor in the horticulture sector. In the 27 states, the average wage of farm workers was €6.34. In 2010, there were estimated to be about 25 million agricultural workers, including farm family members, in the EU-27 states; many were part-time workers. The full-time equivalents were estimated to be about 10 million.

== Careers ==
The share of employment in agriculture, forestry and fishing in total employment declined globally by 13 %age points between 2000 and 2021, to 26.6%. Yet, agriculture remains the second largest source of employment worldwide after the services sector.

In 2023, the wage for a farm worker was $17.55, which is the lowest paid job in the United States. According to Joan Lo and Ariel Jacobson, “five out of the eight lowest paying jobs in the country are in the food system." Farm workers in the United States make up only 1% of workers, even though they are an important part of the food system. Approximately 26% of farm workers who specialize in crop production identify as non-white. Female farm workers are 28% more likely to choose working in crops rather than livestock. As of 2022, 47% of crop workers do not obtain a high school degree, while 34% of workers in livestock do not either.

Many programs exist, such as World-Wide Opportunities on Organic Farms (WWOOF) that facilitate the placement of volunteer farmworkers on specific types of farms. Additionally, farms may offer apprenticeship or internship opportunities where labor is traded for the knowledge and experience gained from a particular type of production. In the United States, formal, or registered, apprenticeships offer competitive wages as well as classroom education in addition to on-the-job training, and are governed by state regulations that ensure minimum standards for wages, education, and training programs are met, in contrast with many informal farm internships which may only offer room and board as compensation and may not primarily benefit the intern.

== See also ==
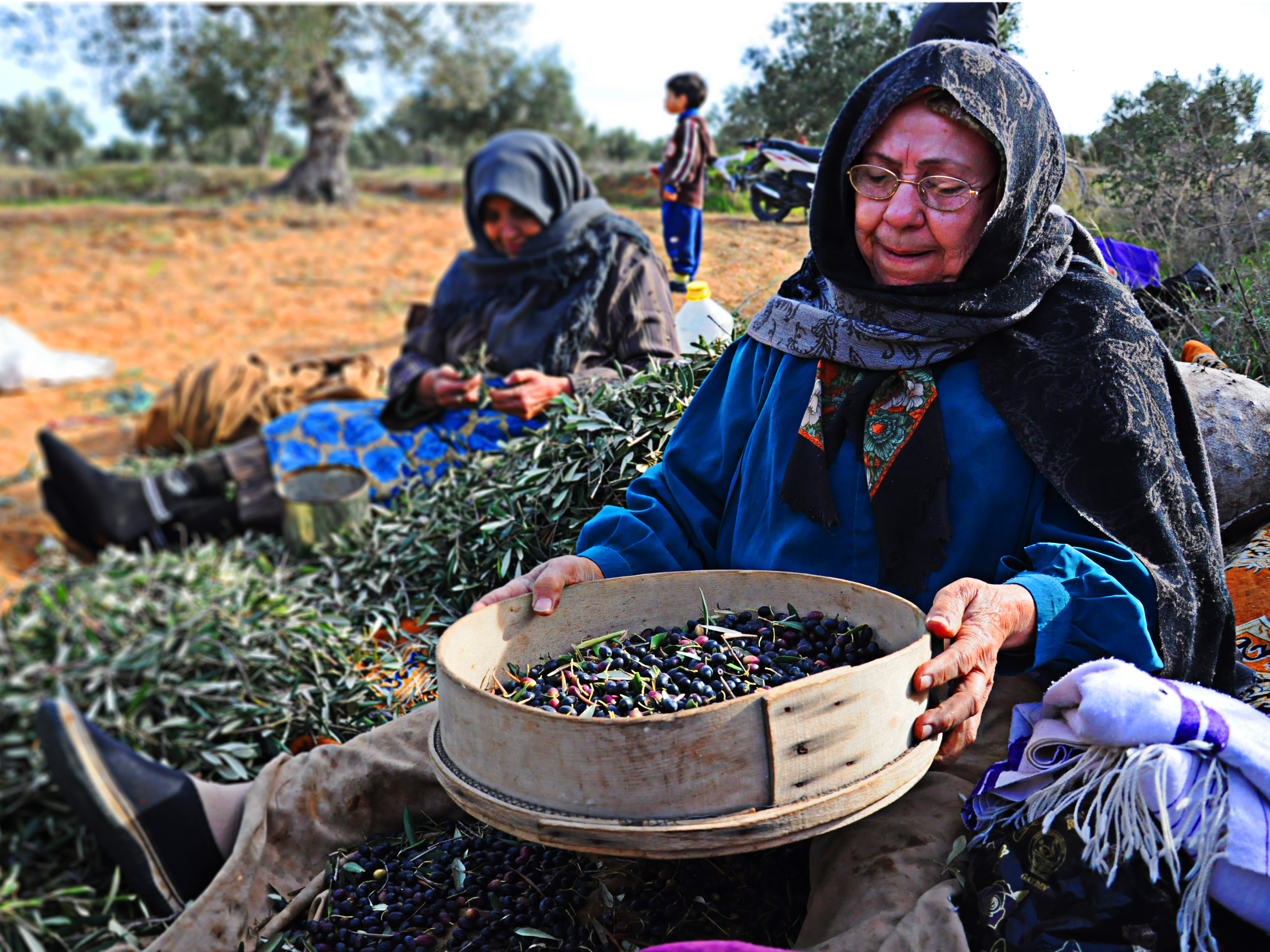
Old woman cleaning olives

- Agroecology
- Farmer
- Food Chain Workers Alliance
- Manual labor
- Migrant worker
- Grower (disambiguation)
- Environmental Justice
- Peasant
- Subsistence agriculture
- United Farm Workers Union

== Sources ==
This article incorporates text from a free content work. Licensed under CC BY-SA IGO 3.0 (license statement/permission). Text taken from World Food and Agriculture – Statistical Yearbook 2023, FAO, FAO.
