= Amanda Aizpuriete =

Latvian poet and translator (1956–2023)

Amanda Aizpuriete (28 March 1956 – 22 October 2023) was a Latvian poet and translator.

== Biography ==
Aizpuriete published seven collections of poems in Latvian. Her works have been translated into at least 14 languages.

Eric Funk composed a symphony for contralto and orchestra, This Eventide Seems Spoiled, using her poetry.

Aizpuriete translated works by Anna Akhmatova, Virginia Woolf, Franz Kafka, Georg Trakl, Joseph Brodsky and other writers.

Amanda Aizpuriete died in October 2023, at the age of 67.

== Awards ==
Notable awards included the Horst Bienek Poetry Prize from the Bavaria Academy of Art (1999), Poetry Days' Prize in Latvia (2000), and the Annual Prize in Literature for best poetry translation (2003).

== Bibliography ==
=== Books in Latvian ===
- "Nāks dārzā māte". Rīga: Liesma, 1980
- "Kāpu iela". Rīga: Liesma, 1986
- "Nākamais autobuss" [arī atdzeja]. Rīga: Liesma, 1990
- "Pēdējā vasara". Rīga: Preses nams, 1995
- "Bābeles nomalē". Rīga: Enigma, 1999
- "Sārtu baložu bars" [pastkaršu komplekts ar dzejoļiem]. Rīga, 1999
- "Vēstuļu vējš". Rīga: Atēna, 2004
- "ledusskapja šūpuļdziesma" [dzeja un proza]. Rīga: Mansards, 2011

=== Books in translation ===
- Die Untiefen des Verrats. Reinbek: Rowohlt, 1993.
- Lass mir das Meer. Reinbek: Rowohlt, 1996.
- Babylonischer Kiez. Reinbek: Rowohlt, 2000.
- Så som skymningen älskar dig. Lund Ariel Ellerström, 2002.
- Сумерки тебя любят. Riga: ALIS, 2005.
- Vihreäsilmäinen yö. Turku: Sammakko, 2006.
- Plaukiotoja naktimis. Šiauliai University, 2009.
