= Stockman =

Stockman may refer to:

- Stockman (Australia), a person who looks after livestock on a station
- Stockman (surname), a surname
- Rancher, an owner of a North American livestock ranch operation
- Cowman (profession), owner or operator of a cattle business
- Dairy farmer, owner or manager of a dairy farm
- Stock contractor, in the United States, contractor who supplies livestock, especially for rodeo
- Shepherd, a person who looks after sheep in the fields
- Suzuki Stockman, a compact pickup truck
- Chery Stockman, a diesel plug-in hybrid mid-size pickup truck

== See also ==
- Station (Australian agriculture)#Personnel
- Stockgrower (disambiguation)
- Stockmann (disambiguation)
- Shtokman field, named after Vladimir Shtokman (Stockmann)
- Stockman's Lash
- Australian Stockman's Hall of Fame
- The Phantom Stockman, a 1953 Australian film
- Dr. G.C. Stockman House, by Frank Lloyd Wright
