= Grant–Kohrs Ranch National Historic Site =

National Historic Site of the United States

- U.S. National Register of Historic Places
- U.S. National Historic Landmark District
- U.S. National Historic Site
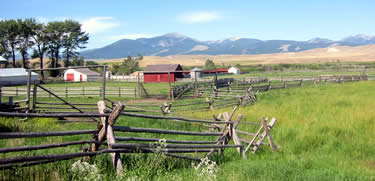
- Grant–Kohrs Ranch

- Location within Montana Location within the United States
- Location: Powell County, Montana, USA
- Nearest city: Deer Lodge, MT
- Coordinates: 46°24′30″N 112°44′22″W
- Area: 1,618 acres (655 ha)
- Built: 1863
- Visitation: 27,219 (2023)
- Website: Grant–Kohrs Ranch National Historic Site
- NRHP reference No.: 72000738

Significant dates
- Designated NHLD: December 19, 1960
- Designated NHS: August 25, 1972

The Grant–Kohrs Ranch National Historic Site, created in 1972, commemorates the Western cattle industry from its 1850s inception through recent times. The original ranch was established in 1862 by a Canadian fur trader, Johnny Grant, at Cottonwood Creek, Montana (future site of Deer Lodge, Montana), along the banks of the Clark Fork river. The ranch was later expanded by a cattle baron, Conrad Kohrs (1866–1920). The 1,618 acres (6.55 km^{2}) historic site (originally designated a National Historic Landmark in 1960) is maintained today as a working ranch by the National Park Service.

== Founding the ranch ==
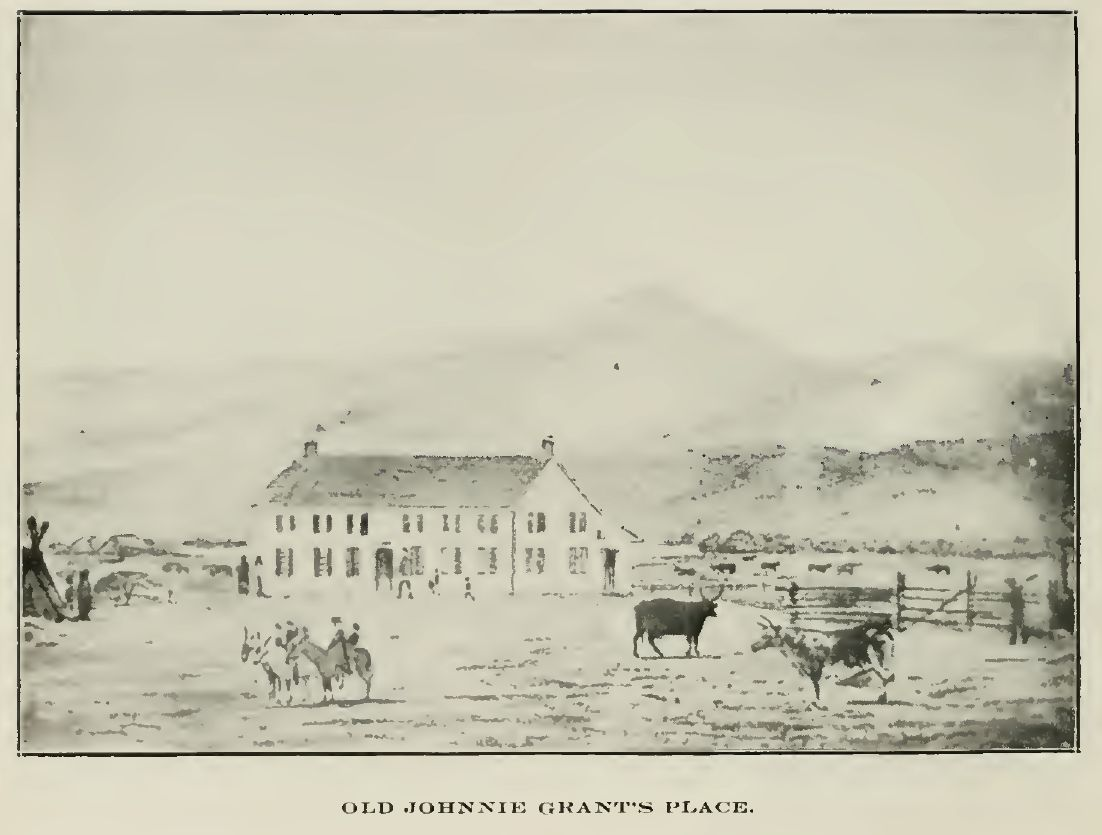
Original ranch

Johnny Francis Grant was born at Fort Edmonton, Alberta, Canada. His mother died when he was only three years old, so he was sent to Trois-Rivières, Quebec, to be raised by his grandmother. His father, Captain Richard Grant, was a Hudson's Bay Company employee, and therefore, in his mid-teens, he left for Fort Hall, Idaho, to meet up with his father. There, both father and son made a considerable profit from emigrants traveling west along the Oregon Trail by trading travelers one healthy cow or horse for two trail-wearied ones. They then fed and rested the tired animals and the following season traded some of the recovered animals to the next year's emigrants, but keeping the best and building up large herds.

Grant started using the Deer Lodge Valley in 1857 to graze his cattle during the winter along the banks of the Clark Fork river near Cottonwood creek. In 1859 he decided to permanently locate a ranch and constructed a permanent residence in 1862. He convinced traders to settle around him, forming the town of Cottonwood (later to become Deer Lodge). Johnny was initially successful, but found that when gold miners arrived in the area, he was at a disadvantage, because he spoke French and the newcomers spoke English. He was taken advantage of in contracts and felt that he could no longer be successful in the area. In August 1866, he sold his ranch to a cattle baron, Conrad Kohrs, for $19,200 and returned to Canada.

== Conrad Kohrs home ranch (1866–1887) ==
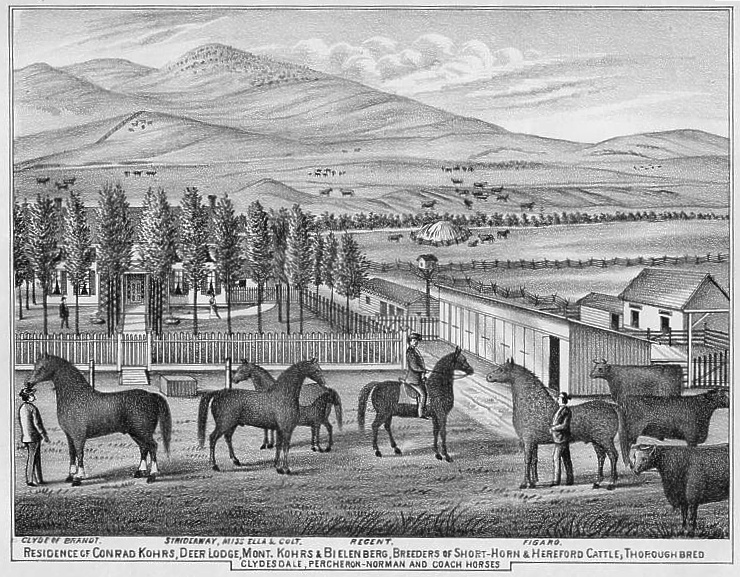
Kohrs-Bielenberg ranch, c. 1880

Conrad Kohrs was born on August 5, 1835, in Wewelsfleth, in Holstein province, which was then a part of the German Confederation. At the age of 22, he became a citizen of the United States. He went to California during the gold rush days. He then moved on to Canada and arrived at the gold camps of Montana in 1862. He never struck gold, but he became wealthy by selling beef to the miners. Kohrs built his cattle operation until he owned 50,000 head of cattle and had grazing pasture of 10 million acres (40,000 km2). However, he had a setback when the severe winter of 1886–1887 left over half the cattle population in the northwest dead. Most cattlemen went bankrupt, but Kohrs managed to receive a 100,000 dollar loan from his banker, A. J. Davis. While the open range era was ending, Kohrs adapted successfully and was able to pay off the loan in only four years.

Kohrs and his half-brother, John Bielenberg, turned to more modern methods of ranching, including buying purebred breeding stock, fencing his rangeland and raising and storing fodder. He became known as "Montana's Cattle King." Bielenberg helped Kohrs to run the Grant–Kohrs ranch. He originally came to Montana at age 18 in 1864 to help with the butcher shop that served the mining camps. Bielenberg had a lot to do with the horse side of the Grant–Kohrs ranch. He bred what were called the "Big Circle" horses, reputed to be able to cover twenty miles of country in a half a day; a trait useful when gathering cattle spread over a very large area. Together, Bielenberg and Kohrs made a most successful team for over half a century.

== Decline of the open range and dissolution of the Kohrs–Bielenberg Ranch (1877–1922) ==
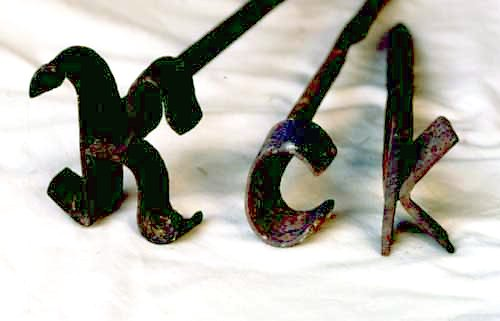
Branding irons, the “Dutch K” used for horses, the C and K brands (for Conrad Kohrs) used for cattle

The winter of 1886–1887 was one of the harshest on record in Montana. Ranchers using the open range for their herds lost upwards of 90% of their cattle to brutal cold and lack of feed. In Eastern Montana, temperatures hovered at 30–40 degrees below zero for weeks on end. The summer of 1887 witnessed a great many ranchers in Montana go out of business.

== Transfer to National Park Service ==
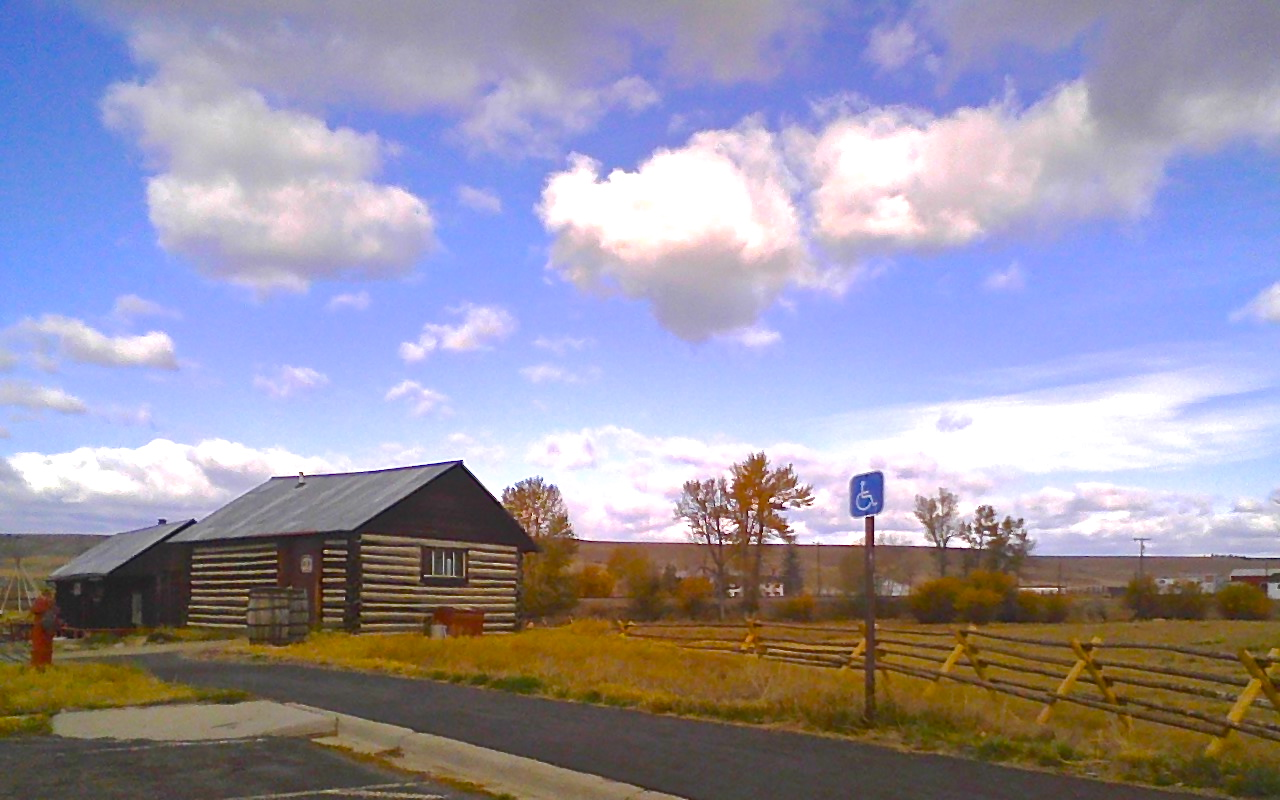
Grant–Kohrs Ranch visitor center

In the 1960s, the National Park Service, under the leadership of Director Conrad Wirth, reenergized the search for historic properties under the auspices of the Historic Sites Act of 1935 and Mission 66. The original Grant–Kohrs ranch was among several other ranches which were recommended for National Historic Landmark status. Con Warren wanted to sell the Grant–Kohrs portion of his ranch to the National Park Service as a historic landmark. In 1970 an agreement to sell the property to the park service was achieved with the proviso that it would be managed as a living ranch by the National Park Service. The original purchase involved 130 acres (0.53 km^{2}) of the active Warren Hereford Ranch. In December 1970, the National Park Foundation acquired an additional 1,180 acres (4.8 km^{2}) of the ranch allowing the National Park Service to take administrative control of the site.

In August 1972, the U.S. Congress authorized the establishment of Grant–Kohrs Ranch National Historic Site to provide an understanding of the frontier cattle era of the Nation’s history, to preserve the Grant–Kohrs Ranch, and to interpret the nationally significant values thereof for the benefit and inspiration of future generations. In 1972 the National Park Foundation transferred ownership of its portions of the site to the National Park Service. Initially the site was administered under the jurisdiction of Yellowstone National Park. In 1972 the Grant–Kohrs Ranch National Historic Site was administratively listed on the National Register of Historic Places.

Throughout the 1970s, the National Park Service continued to acquire acreage from Conrad Warren, rehabilitate elements of the ranch and provide improvements for visitation to include a visitor center, interpretive trails and access for the public. In 1974 the site became an independently operating unit of the National Park Service with its own superintendent, historian and budget. A formal dedication ceremony was held on July 17, 1977, and visitors were admitted to the new site.,

== National Park Service operations ==
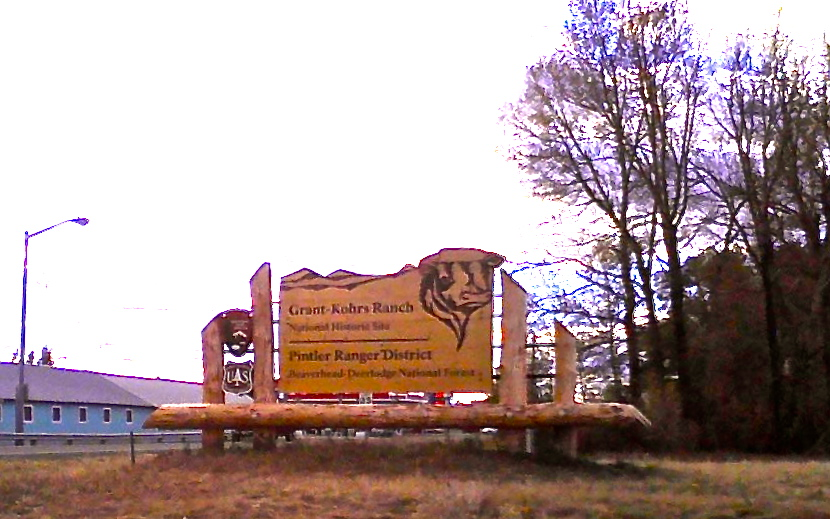
Entrance to Grant–Kohrs ranch on the west side of the city of Deer Lodge; Powell County Fairgrounds visible in background

The Grant–Kohrs National Historic Site today is operated by the National Park Service. It is a major tourist attraction in Deer Lodge, Montana, and the tour is free. The National Park Service runs it as a living history ranch, using draft horse teams to hay the land, and blacksmiths on site make horseshoes for the horses. They keep all operations as close to how they would be in the 19th century as possible.

=== Ranch properties ===
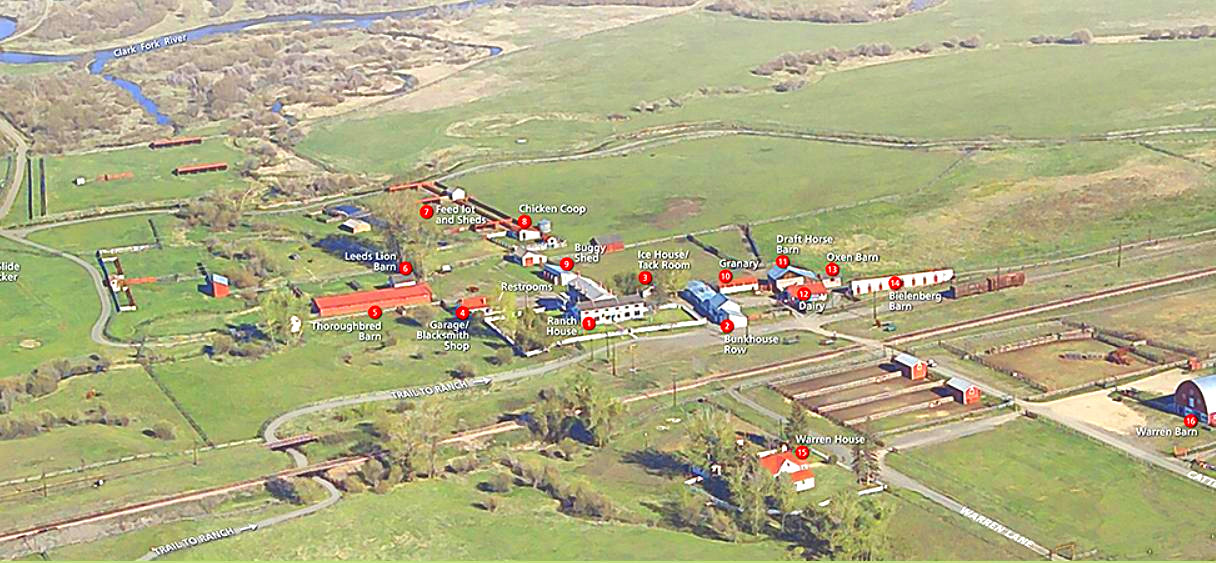
Aerial map of ranch site

== See also ==
- National Register of Historic Places listings in Powell County, Montana
- List of National Historic Landmarks in Montana

== Notes ==
- John Milner Associates; Rivanna Archaeological Consulting; Susan Maxman & Partners Architects (July 2004). Grant–Kohrs Ranch National Historic Site, Deer Lodge, Montana, Cultural Landscape Report Part I (PDF). National Park Service. Archived from the original (PDF) on January 14, 2014.
- Shapins Belt Collins (February 2009). Grant–Kohrs Ranch National Historic Site, Deer Lodge, Montana, Cultural Landscape Report Part II (PDF). National Park Service. Archived from the original (PDF) on January 14, 2014.
- John Albright (1979). "Grant Kohrs Ranch National Historic Resource Study, Cultural Resources Statement and Historic Structure Report". National Park Service. Archived from the original on January 14, 2014.
