= Kevin S. Giles =

American journalist and author (born 1952)

Kevin S. Giles (born 1952) is an American journalist and author whose books are set in his native western Montana. He was born and raised in western Montana. Two of his books take place in his hometown of Deer Lodge: a novel, "Summer of the Black Chevy" (2015) and the nonfiction work, "Jerry's Riot: The True Story of Montana's 1959 Prison Disturbance." (2005)

In October 2016, Giles published "One Woman Against War: The Jeannette Rankin Story," a biography of the first woman elected to the United States Congress. It is an expanded edition of his 1980 Rankin biography, "Flight of the Dove." Rankin was elected in 1916 when women in many states did not have the right to vote. She had led a post-suffrage drive to organize voting in Montana, her home state, and Montana in 1914 joined a bloc of western states that enfranchised women at the polls. "Flight of the Dove," published by Touchstone Press in Portland, Oregon, sold out of its first printing.

As a journalist, Giles has been a reporter, editor and designer at six daily newspapers, including three in Montana. He also worked for The Courier Mail in Brisbane, Queensland, Australia, and North Dakota's Bismarck Tribune where he was chief editor from 1988 to 1997. Giles was an editor, photographer and staff writer at the Star Tribune in Minneapolis-St. Paul until 2018.
