= Stockman (surname) =

Stockman is a surname. Notable people with the surname include:

- Billy Stockman Tjapaltjarri (1927–2015), Australian artist
- David Stockman (born 1946), former US Representative and Director of the Office of Management and Budget
- Farah Stockman (born 1974), American journalist
- Gerald R. Stockman (born 1934), American politician
- Harry Stockman (1919–1994), American racing driver
- Hayley Stockman (born 1985), New Zealand netball player
- Hervey S. Stockman, (1922-2011), colonel of the U.S. Air Force, first pilot to fly over the Soviet Union in a U-2, atomic sampling pilot
- Jacques Stockman (1938–2013), Belgian football player
- Lily Stockman (born 1982), American artist and writer
- Lowell Stockman (1901–1962), former US Representative
- Mark Stockman (1947–2020), Soviet-born American physicist
- Phil Stockman (born 1980), British baseball player
- Ralph Stockman Tarr (1864–1912), American geographer
- René Stockman (born 1954), Belgian religious leader
- Ron Stockman (born 1934), Australian football player
- Sam Stockman (born 1982), British actor
- Shawn Stockman (born 1972), American singer
- Steve Stockman (born 1956), former US Representative

== Fictional characters ==
- Baxter Stockman, fictional character in the Teenage Mutant Ninja Turtles

== See also ==
- Stockmann (surname)
