= Conrad Kohrs =

American politician

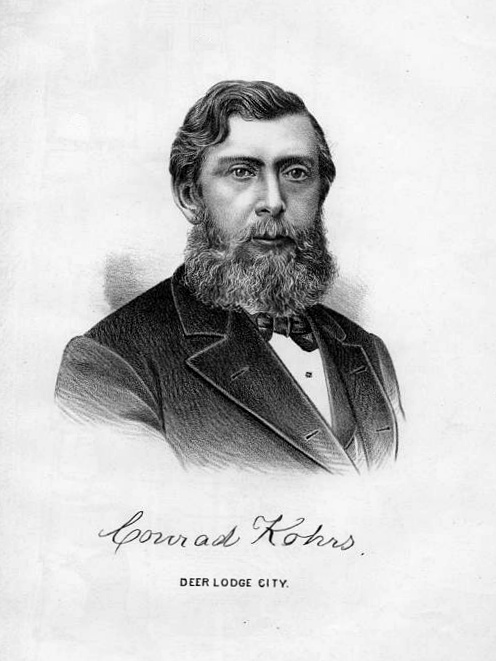
Conrad Kohrs, ca. 1885

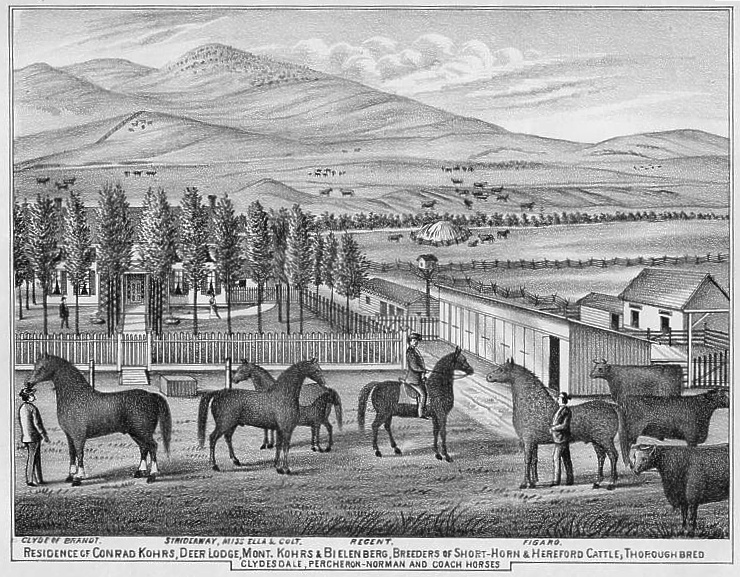
Kohrs Ranch in Deer Lodge, Montana, ca. 1885

Conrad Kohrs, born Carsten Conrad Kohrs (August 5, 1835 – 23 July 1920) was a Montana cattle rancher (cattle baron) and politician.

== Biography ==
He was born in Holstein, a province that was ethnically and culturally German and part of the German Confederation but ruled at the time in personal union by Denmark. At age 15, he went to sea and, over the next 17 years worked as a seaman; a butcher; a sausage salesman; ran log rafts down the Mississippi; and worked in a distillery. He became a U.S. citizen in 1857.

Hearing of gold in California, he traveled first there, then to the Fraser River country of Canada, and finally to the gold camps of Montana Territory in 1862. There, he began to build a fortune, not from mining for gold, but from owning gold camp butcher shops and selling beef to miners.

In 1866, he began a ranching empire by purchasing a ranch near Deer Lodge from former Canadian fur-trader Johnny Grant. Initially, he used it to hold the beef that was supplying his own operations, but eventually built the operation up until, at its peak, it owned 50,000 head of cattle, grazing on 10 million acres (40,000 km^{2}), spread across four states and two Canadian Provinces and shipping 10,000 head of cattle annually to the Chicago stock yards. After the disastrous winter of 1886–1887, during which tens of thousands of head of cattle were lost and which began the death of the open range style of ranching, Kohrs and his half-brother, John Bielenberg, were among the first to recover and adopt more modern methods of ranching; buying purebred breeding stock; fencing ranges; raising and storing feed, etc. Thus he earned the nickname, "Montana's Cattle King".

During his lifetime, he also became involved in politics, first on the local and later on the state level. He was elected a county commissioner in 1869, serving a two-year term. He was a member of the Territorial Assembly of 1885 and, in 1889, he was elected a member of the original Montana State Constitutional Convention (there was another in 1972). He also served as President of the Montana Stockgrower's Association. He died on July 23, 1920, at his home at 804 Dearborn Avenue, Helena, Montana, aged 84.[Death Certificate, Lewis and Clark County, July 24, 1920]

== Legacy ==
In 1902, Kohrs and his wife, Augusta, built a library in Deer Lodge for $30,000, as a memorial to their son. The William K. Kohrs Memorial Library is modeled after the Carnegie Libraries. As of 2012, it is "the only dedicated public library in Powell County."

The home ranch near Deer Lodge, Montana, was held by the family until 1972, when his grandson sold it to the National Park Service. It is now the Grant-Kohrs Ranch National Historic Site.

In 1958, he was inducted into the Hall of Great Westerners of the National Cowboy & Western Heritage Museum.
