= Margaret Borland =

19th-century American pioneer

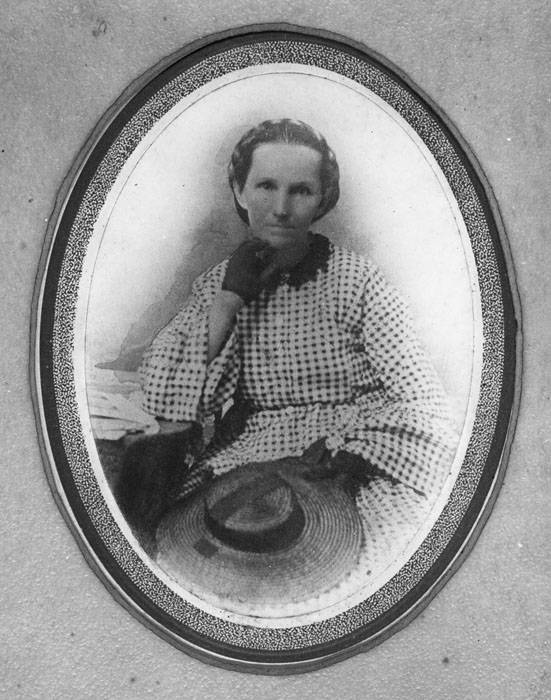
- Borland c. 1872
- Born: Margaret Heffernan; April 3, 1824; Ireland
- Died: July 5, 1873 (aged 49); Wichita, Kansas, U.S.
- Occupation: Cattle baron
- Spouse: Harrison Dunbar (m. 1843; died 1844) Milton Hardy (m. 1845; died 1852) Alexander Borland (m. 1856; died 1867)
- Children: Mary Dunbar, Eliza Hardy, Julia Hardy, Rosa Hardy, William Hardy, William Borland, Nellie Borland, Alexander Borland, and James Borland
- Parent(s): John Heffernan; Julia Heffernan

Margaret Heffernan Borland (April 3, 1824 – July 5, 1873) was a pioneering frontier woman who ran her own ranch, as well as handled her own herds. She made a name for herself as a cattle baron and was famous for the drive of Texas Longhorn cattle that she took up the Chisholm Trail from Texas to Wichita, Kansas, with her three surviving children and her granddaughter. To date, she is the only known woman in the history of the United States to run her own cattle drive and was considered one of the first cattle queens after being widowed thrice.

== Early life ==
Margaret Heffernan was born on April 3, 1824 in Ireland. Her parents were both born there as well, but they sailed to America and arrived in New York City when Margaret was five. Her father was a candlemaker who moved to Texas after he was having a hard time making ends meet. In 1829, when a land agent told Margaret's father about money opportunities in Texas, the Heffernans moved West to find fortune. The government of Mexico was offering incentives as well to families that supplied their own tools and were able to sustain themselves for a year. If a family was able to do that the government would give a yoke of oxen, a cart, ten milking cows, and a league of land. In addition, the family was required to practice Catholicism and to speak Spanish for business purposes. Margaret was nine years old when she arrived in Texas.

The family was part of the McMullen-McGloin colony that was aiming to place around 200 families into Texas. Once arriving in Texas, the family settled on land that was surrounded by the wild prairies near San Patricio in south Texas. There Margaret's father fared well with the Texas cattle industry, along with many Irish settlers, as the cattle industry was a common occupation for Irish settlers in the South at the time.

Margaret's father died shortly after at the hands of José de Urrea's forces during the Texas Revolution prior to the campaign led personally by Santa Anna. Along with her father, and another cousin, her uncle, his wife, and their five children were killed in the same attack. The surviving family fled to a fort at Goliad. The family returned home when news of recent successful campaigns against the Native Americans had reached their camp. Unfortunately, they were only able to be home for a short period before escalating tension with Mexico caused the government to advise residents to move from the area for protection purposes in October 1836. The family went to Brazoria, TX. The family was there at least two years before moving again. Margaret's mother would never remarry and she died in Victoria, TX in 1849.

== Marriages and Family Life ==
In August 1843, Margaret married a man named Harrison Dunbar. In the 1840 census, Harrison Dunbar was listed as having 30 head of cattle, which would have set Margaret up for the beginning of her own career in cattle. Margaret gave birth to their daughter Mary in 1844, but Harrison died shortly after her birth from wounds he received in a pistol duel. Margaret was only 20 years old at the time.

Shortly after, in October 1845, Margaret was remarried to a man named Milton Hardy. In the same 1840 census that showed the cattle count for Margaret's first husband, the census showed her second husband had 2,912 acres of land, as well as having five additional lots in town. They had two children together in the following two years. Two girls, Eliza who did not survive infancy, and Julia. The couple owned slaves and in Milton's 1847 will he made note that a slave he owned named Louisa and her children were to be freed upon his death. In 1852, Margaret gave birth to another healthy daughter named Rosa. That same year Milton contracted cholera during an epidemic that also killed their young son William, and he died on August 24. Milton had 1200 heads of cattle at the time of his death. Louisa was not freed according to Milton's will and she was forced to continue to care for Margaret's children, and future children, where she was known to them as 'Mammy'.

Margaret was married for the third and final time to a man named Alexander Borland on February 11, 1856. In 1858, Alexander participated in Victoria's first annual live stock exhibition. By the 1860 census, the couple had amassed the largest herd of cattle in Victoria, a number of 8,000. Additionally, they had twelve slaves, multiple properties, and personal wealth they had gained. They had four children together, 3 boys and a girl named Nellie. The Civil War gave the Borlands access to millions of cattle that were free roaming in Texas due to many ranchers leaving their farms to fight for the Confederate States Army. By 1867, the Borlands opened their own store but Alexander was not well. Since he had the money, Alexander spent it to see a surgeon in New Orleans, LA hoping to receive the best medical care. Alexander never returned to Victoria, and died in New Orleans, leaving Margaret a widow for the third time in her life.

For Margaret, the tragedy did not stop there for her or her family. In the summer of the same year of Alexander's death, yellow fever was spreading across Texas. The town of Victoria was not spared during this time, and the first casualty for the family was Margaret's daughter Rosa, who was only 15 at the time of her death. Margaret's firstborn Mary was next and, shortly after Mary died, her infant son died as well. Margaret's daughter Julia, who was 19 and a new mom herself, also succumbed to the illness. Julia's husband, Victor Rose, who almost perished himself during the epidemic, left their daughter named Julia Rose with Margaret so she could raise her. With all of her children from her first two marriages now dead, Margaret began to bury her children from her most recent marriage. William was only 6 years old when he died in the same epidemic. By the time the epidemic ended with the cooler winter temperatures setting in, Margaret only had three surviving children out of the nine she birthed.

Her son-in-law, Victor Rose, went on to become a writer, editor, and historian where he wrote about Margaret from an intimate perspective so we are able to gain some insight as to who she was from someone who knew her personally. Victor said this of Margaret in the local newspaper The Victoria Advocate, "a woman of resolute will, and self-reliance, yet was she not one of the kindest mothers. She had, unaided, acquired a good education, her manners were lady-like, and when fortune smiled upon her at last in a pecuniary sense, she was as perfectly at home in the drawing room of the cultured as if refinement had engulfed its polishing touches upon her mind in maidenhood."

== Cattlewoman ==
After the death of Alexander, Margaret took on full responsibility for purchasing and selling her cattle. She had previously worked with Alexander handling the cattle and therefore had a fair understanding of how to run her ranch. She did receive help from slaves, relatives, and farm hands when it came to the actual physical labor required to manage and maintain the herd. Her brother James Heffernan stayed with her and her family and was considered to be a loyal and hardworking man who helped his sister during difficult times. She did face hardships still, in the winter of 1871-72 a freak blizzard struck Victoria and killed thousands of her cattle who froze to death due to the storm. Despite the hardships of the previous years, by 1873 Margaret had over 10,000 cattle. Margaret decided to sell some of her cattle to provide some more income. The problem was that the prices for Texas cattle were about $8 per head, whereas the prices for cattle in Kansas were almost $24 per head. Margaret made the unprecedented decision to be her own trail boss and to drive her cattle over the Chisholm Trail to Kansas. To do this meant she needed to take her surviving children and her young granddaughter with her despite the dangerous road that lay ahead for them all. At the age of 49, Margaret made the decision to take her family and 2,500 cattle to Wichita, Kansas in search of opportunity and fortune. Her bravery and courage to be the first woman to undertake this effort made the local newspapers and made her name well known in the South, as well as the rest of the United States.

== Trail Boss on the Chisholm Trail to Kansas ==
The family set out for the Chisholm Trail, which started in South Texas, in 1873 with half a dozen hired hands in order to manage the herd of over 2,000 cattle. Margaret had to deal with trail hands that were superstitious and sometimes misogynistic, as they often saw women on the trail as a bad omen for them. It took the group about two months to make it from Texas to Kansas. During this time, they traveled at a leisurely pace to ensure the cattle were grazing enough and were not getting overly tired. Losing cattle to hunger and exhaustion was a real concern. They passed through Oklahoma before it was a state and was still considered Indian territory. Although it is possible that the group sold some of their animals to Indian agents to keep danger at bay or for supplies, when the group arrived in Kansas they still had a majority of their herd. In the year 1873, it is believed that around 400,000 Texas cattle total were brought into Kansas. Due to this influx, the cattle market crashed in the later part of the year and the cattle the Borlands brought from Texas did not earn them the financial gain they had expected. In fact, most cattle drivers who tried their luck in Kansas in 1873 suffered a financial loss. Sadly, Margaret would not make it to see the cattle sold, as she took ill towards the end of their journey and would not be able to make a full recovery.

== Death ==
After successfully reaching Wichita, Kansas, via the Chisholm Trail, Margaret Borland was taken seriously sick by an illness known as trail fever. It has also been cited as congestion of the brain or meningitis. She did not recover, and died in a boardinghouse. The Wichita Beacon newspaper, now The Wichita Eagle, reported of Margaret's death "died at the Planter house Saturday evening with mania, superinduced by her long, tedious journey and over-taxation of the brain."

Margaret Borland died on July 5, 1873, aged 49. Her body was returned to Texas; her sons Alex and Jesse bought her a gravestone which reads,

Our Mama
Margaret Heffernan Borland
Born Apr. 3, 1824
Died July 5, 1873
Gone but not forgotten

— Evergreen Cemetery, Victoria

== Sources ==
- Borland, Margaret (1858–1879). "Margaret Borland Papers". Dolph Briscoe Center for American History, The University of Texas at Austin (77 legal and financial records). Austin, TX. OCLC 68903766. Archived from the original on July 7, 2019.
- Flanagan, Sue (1974). Trailing the longhorns: a century later. Madison, WI: The University of Wisconsin. ISBN 978-0-89052-033-8.
- King, C. Richard (1972). Kelley, Dayton (ed.). "Margaret Borland". Texana (historical journal). 10 (4) (1st ed.). Waco, TX: Robert E. Davis, Texian Press of Waco.
- McIlvain, Myra Hargrave (2017). Texas Tales: Stories That Shaped a Landscape and a People (historical biographies). Santa Fe, NM: Sunstone Press. ISBN 978-1-61139-493-1.
- McKenzie, Phyllis A. (2006). "Margaret Heffernan Dunbar Hardy Borland: Mrs. Alexander Borland". In Massey, Sara R. (ed.). Texas women on the cattle trails. Sam Rayburn Series on Rural Life. Vol. 13 (1st ed.). College Station, TX: Texas A & M University. pp. 89–118. ISBN 978-1-58544-543-1. OCLC 63195875.
- McNutt, James C. (April 26, 2017) [June 12, 2010]. "Borland, Margaret Heffernan". The Handbook of Texas. Texas State Historical Association (TSHA). Archived from the original on July 5, 2019.
- Osborne, Susan, ed. (July 2015). "Meet Margaret Borland...the only woman to ever run a Texas cattle drive" (PDF). Dock Line Magazine (Lake Conroe ed.). Willis, TX: Verle "Ozzy" Osborne. p. 66. Archived (PDF) from the original on March 3, 2019 – via San Jacinto River Authority.
- Rose, Victor Marion (1883). History of Victoria (reprinted as: A Republishing of a book most often known as Victor Rose's History of Victoria. Victoria, TX: Book Mart (1961)). Laredo, TX: Daily Times Press.
