= Stockmann (surname) =

Stockmann is a German surname. Notable people with the surname include:

- Arnold Stockmann (1882–1963), Swiss goldsmith
- Dieter Stöckmann (born 1941), German general
- Hans-Jürgen Stöckmann (born 1945), German physicist
- Jaap Stockmann (born 1984), Dutch field hockey player
- Nis-Momme Stockmann (born 1981), German writer
- Paul Stockmann (1603–1636), German composer
- Ulrich Stockmann (born 1951), German politician

== Fictional characters ==
- Ernst Stockmann, fictional character in the novel The Temple by Stephen Spender
- Thomas Stockmann, fictional character in the play An Enemy of the People by Henrik Ibsen
- Baxter Stockmann, fictional character in "The Teenage Mutant Ninja Turtles" cartoon series

== See also ==
- Elana Maryles Sztokman (born 1969), American writer
- Vladimir Shtokman (1909–1968), Russian engineer
- Stockman (disambiguation)
- Stock (surname)
