= Eric Funk =

- Born: Deer Lodge, Montana
- Occupations: Composer, conductor, teacher

Eric Funk (born 1949) is an American contemporary classical composer and conductor. Originally from Deer Lodge, Montana, he currently resides in Bozeman, Montana, where he taught music courses at Montana State University. He is also the Artistic Director and Host for Montana PBS's 11th & Grant with Eric Funk, an Emmy Award-winning show broadcast on Montana PBS featuring local musicians.

== Career ==
From 1994 to 2002, Eric was conductor of the Helena Symphony Orchestra in Helena, Montana. From 1994 to 1999, he was also the conductor of the Gallatin Chamber Orchestra in Bozeman, Montana.

Dr. Funk was featured on the Charles Osgood CBS Sunday Morning show in October 1998, which in turn followed on the heels of a front-page story in the New York Times "Arts & Leisure" section (April 14, 1998). More recently, Dr. Funk was featured on the nationally syndicated NPR radio show, "Theme & Variations" (August 23–30, 2002).

Funk has taught music in Oregon, Texas and Montana, and spent 20 years as an adjunct professor in the School of Music at Montana State University.

== Musical Works ==
Dr. Funk's musical works include five symphonies, three operas, six ballet scores, three large works for chorus and orchestra, thirteen concertos, several orchestral tone poems, and numerous works for chamber ensembles, solo instruments, and vocal works. Among recent prominent premiers of his works include his one-act solo opera for contralto and ballet troupe, Akhmatova, based on key texts from the Russian poet's life, his Violin Concerto, and the song cycles Gongora (for baritone and chamber orchestra, on texts by the Spanish baroque poet) and Sequentia (contralto and 9-person chamber ensemble, on texts by Paul Celan).

Newly completed works include the massive Mandelshtam: A Valediction to the 20th Century, a work in 5 movements for large chorus, two orchestras, and amplified string quartet, based on poems by the Russian poet Osip Mandelshtam. The latter was commissioned by the Gallatin Performing Arts Center for their upcoming grand opening. Past performance venues for his works include Carnegie Hall, the Renda Theater, and the Gaudeamus International Interpreters of Contemporary Music Festival (Rotterdam); as well as numerous theaters and concert halls in the U.S. and Eastern Europe. His works have earned him numerous awards and commissions, including 13 ASCAP Standard Awards, the 2001 Governor's Award for the Arts (Montana), and three Arts Commission Fellowships.

Numerous compositions of Dr. Funk have been recorded commercially. These include three releases on the MMC label, featuring three of his symphonies (Nos. 1, 3, and 4), as well as two concertos and a string quartet. His Symphony No. 5, "Dante Ascending" was recently released on the composer's own label, and recorded by the Latvian National Symphony Orchestra and Opera Chorus, conducted by Terje Mikkelsen.

== Awards and recognition ==
Throughout his career Eric Funk wone 13 ASCAP Standard Awards.

In 2001 he was awarded the Montana Governor's Award for the Arts. He was also awarded the President's Excellence in Teaching Award at MSU in 2007, and the Distinguished Service Award University Honors Program in 2009.

On December 15, 2023, Funk was awarded the honorary degree of Doctor of Arts from Montana State University.
