= Deer Lodge, Montana =

City in Powell County, Montana, United States

Deer Lodge
- City
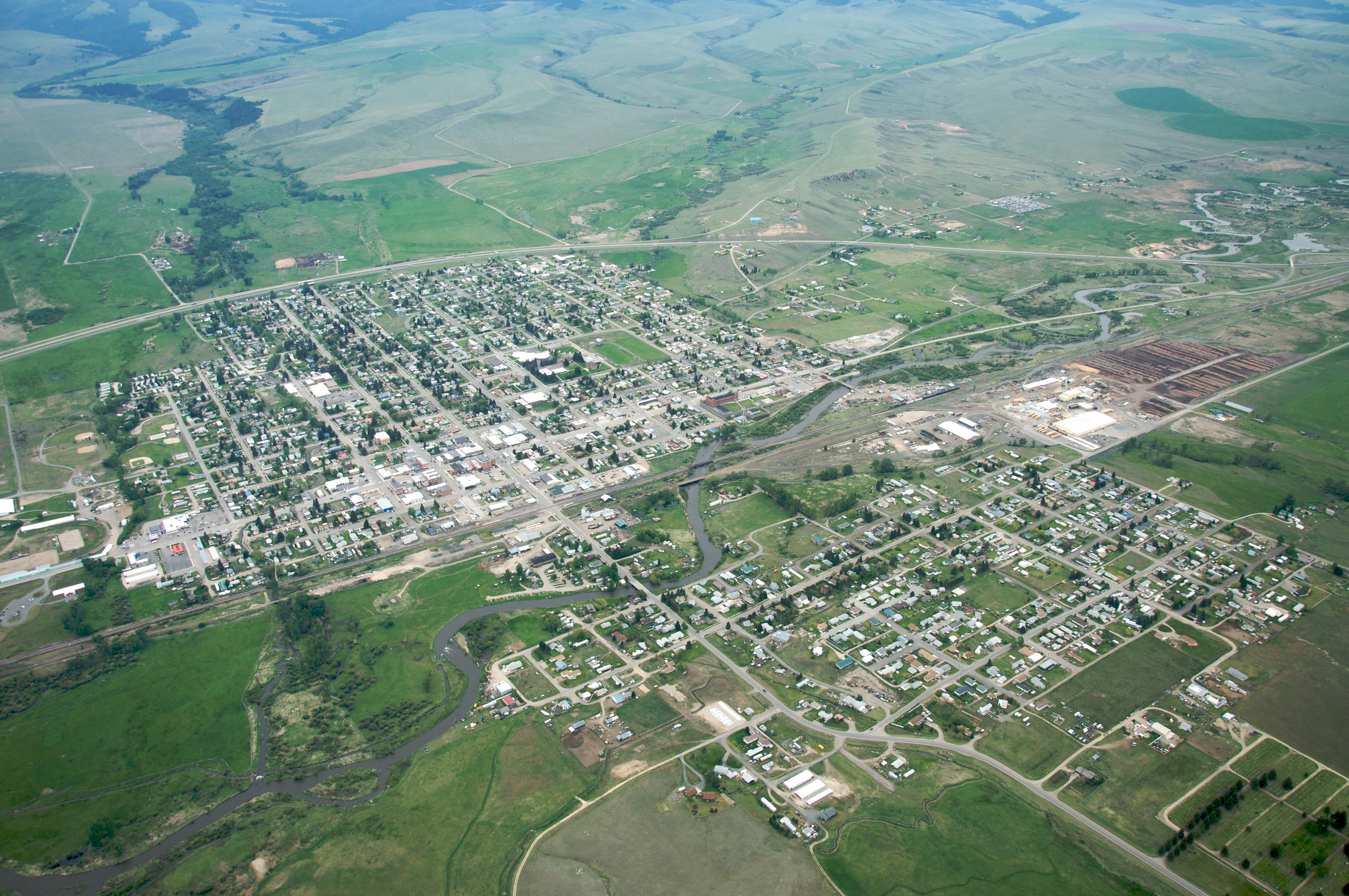

- Location of Deer Lodge, Montana

- Location in the United States
- Coordinates: 46°23′54″N 112°44′00″W
- Country: United States
- State: Montana
- County: Powell

Area
  - Total: 1.55 sq mi (4.01 km^{2})
  - Land: 1.55 sq mi (4.01 km^{2})
  - Water: 0 sq mi (0.00 km^{2})
- Elevation: 4,538 ft (1,383 m)

Population (2020)
  - Total: 2,938
  - Density: 1,895/sq mi (731.8/km^{2})
- Time zone: UTC-7 (Mountain (MST))
  - Summer (DST): UTC-6 (MDT)
- ZIP code: 59722
- Area code: 406
- FIPS code: 30-19825
- GNIS feature ID: 2410310
- Website: www.cityofdeerlodgemt.gov

Deer Lodge is a city in and the county seat of Powell County, Montana, United States. Its population was 2,938 at the 2020 census.

== Description ==
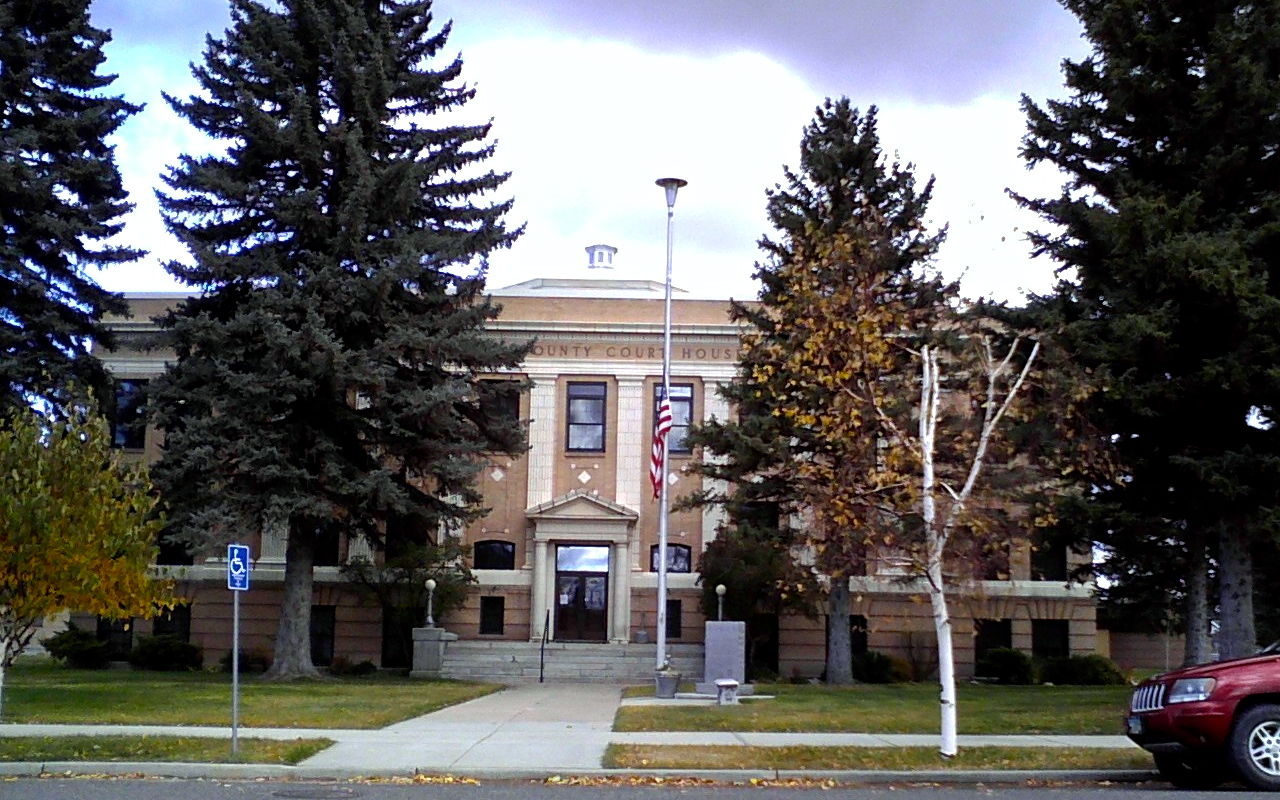
Powell County Courthouse, Deer Lodge

The city is perhaps best known as the home of the Montana State Prison, a major local employer. The Montana State Hospital in Warm Springs and the former state tuberculosis sanitarium in nearby Galen are the result of the power the western part of the state held over Montana at statehood due to the copper and mineral wealth in that area. Deer Lodge was also once an important railroad town, serving as a division headquarters for the Chicago, Milwaukee, St. Paul and Pacific Railroad ("the Milwaukee Road") before the railroad's local abandonment in 1980.

The current Montana State Prison occupies a campus 3.5 miles (5.6 km) west of town. The former prison site, at the south end of Deer Lodge's Main Street, is now the Old Prison Museum. In addition to a former cellblock building, the museum complex includes a theater, antique and automobile museums, and a former Milwaukee Road "Little Joe" electric locomotive.

Deer Lodge is also the location of Grant-Kohrs Ranch National Historic Site, dedicated to the interpretation of the frontier cattle ranching era. This site was the home of Conrad Kohrs, one of the famous "Cattle Kings" of Montana, whose land holdings once stretched over a million acres (4,000 km^{2}) of Montana, Wyoming, and Alberta, Canada. The Grant-Kohrs ranch was built in 1862 by Johnny Grant, a Scottish/French/Metis fur-trader and trapper who encouraged his people to settle in Deer Lodge because of its pleasant climate and large areas of bunch grass prairie, ideal for raising cattle and horses. The city's name derives from a geological formation known as Warm Springs Mound, which contained natural saline that made for a natural salt lick for the local deer population, the protected valley where Deer Lodge is located was where most of the local wildlife would winter as the temperatures lowered in the high country.

Deer Lodge was the site of the College of Montana, the first institution of higher learning in the state.

== History ==
Extant mentions of the Deer Lodge Valley prior to 1860 are found as occasional remarks in records written for other purposes. Consistent record-keeping begins with the writings of Granville Stuart and others in the early 1860s. (Note: Here I assume absence of evidence (for continuous writings before 1861) to be evidence of absence.) 1860 marks the beginning of permanent occupation of both the valley and the future site of the city of Deer Lodge by European-Americans.

=== Fur trade era ===
Before 1860, the Deer Lodge Valley was not the territory of any American Indian group. Gatherings were held there, including horse races. American Indian groups from the west, Flatheads, Pend d'Oreilles et al. passed through the valley as an alternative route to and from the buffalo hunting grounds to the east.

The first documented visit to this area by European-American explorers occurred in 1805–1806, when Lewis and Clark's Corps of Discovery expedition passed by the Deer Lodge Valley without entering it. Evidence of earlier incursion, probably by Spaniards, was noted by miner James B. Beattle on Sugar Loaf mountain in the Race Track mining district on the west side of the Deer Lodge Valley.

Early European trapper/traders passing through the valley referred to it as "the Deer House Plains". The Clark Fork river was called the Arrow Stone River in the 1830s. By the 1850s it was called the Deer Lodge Creek/Hellgate River. Catholic Father Pierre-Jean De Smet brought the first wagons known to have passed through the valley, in 1841.

In 1846, the Deer Lodge Valley became part of the United States and Oregon Territory with the signing of the Oregon Treaty by the U. S. and Great Britain. From 1853 to 1863 it was in Washington Territory, then briefly part of Idaho Territory until the creation of Montana Territory in 1864. (Note: Eastern and western Montana were first joined as part of Idaho Territory)

European-American settlement of the valley gained momentum during the 1850s and 60's, with the primary site being at present-day Deer Lodge. During the 1850s, trapper/traders from Fort Hall began wintering herds of horses and cattle in the valley. Also during that decade placer gold finds were made near present-day Gold Creek, first in 1852 by Francois (Bennetsee) Findley, followed in 1856 by Hereford, Saunders, Madison et al., and in 1858–61 by James and Granville Stuart, Reese Anderson et al. In 1860–62, Lt. John Mullan oversaw construction of the Mullan Road, which connected Walla Walla, Washington Territory with Fort Benton, then in Dakota Territory. The Mullan Road passed through the north end of the Deer Lodge Valley.

=== European-American settlement, Montana gold rush ===
Johnny Grant in his prime

John Francis (Johnny) Grant built the first permanent structures in the valley in 1859–60, at Grantsville near present-day Garrison. Grant had begun grazing cattle and horse herds in the north valley several years previously and "wintered over" there in 1857–58. In 1860, feeling as he said "lonely", he returned to Fort Hall for summer trading and induced several fellow trader/trappers and their families to return to the valley with him at the end of the season. (Note: Johnny Grant noted that Louis Deschenault, Leon Quesnelle, Louis Demers, David Contois, Fred Burr, the Stuart boys (James & Granville), the Cosgrove boys, Jackson, Jack Meek and two sons of Michaud Leclerc came back with him. They mostly settled at Spanish Fork/Cottonwood.) Instead of locating at Grantsville, his friends chose to build at the site of present-day Deer Lodge, where several Mexican trapper/traders and their Metis families had already established the seasonal settlement of Spanish Fork. (Note: Included were Thomas Lavatta, Joe Hill, Alejo Barasta, Joe Pizanthia (Note: Pizanthia, also called "the greaser", was executed at Virginia City in 1864 by vigilantes for killing George Copely and wounding Smith Ball.) et al and their families.) While Johnny Grant had been at Fort Hall, several people had come from Fort Union down the Mullan Road route and begun building homes at Grantsville. (Note: These included Joe Prudhomme and "quite a number of families" associated with the American Fur Company)

In 1861, the Stuart brothers and Reese Anderson established American Fork near present-day Gold Creek. Also in that year Johnny Grant moved his large family to his newly built house at Deer Lodge, at the present-day site of Grant-Kohrs Ranch National Historic Site. (Note: This is still the main house at Grant-Kohrs.) During the next two years, placer gold discoveries at Grasshopper Creek, Alder Gulch and other locations to the south caused a population decline in the valley, including the abandonment of Grantsville and American Fork. Beginning in 1864 with gold strikes to the north, Deer Lodge City grew rapidly as a base for supplies to mines in the surrounding mountains.

=== Montana Territory ===
By 1861–1862, Spanish Fork was more often referred to as Cottonwood. In 1862, a Deer Lodge Town Committee was established to lay out the town site, to be called LaBarge City - after Missouri River steamboat Captain Joseph LaBarge whose firm, LaBarge, Harkness & Company, had proposed to start a business in Cottonwood. (Note: Capt. LaBarge's partner, James Harkness, embarked from St. Louis to Fort Benton to Cottonwood/Deer Lodge City in 1862 to explore business possibilities. After spending a week in the valley, he dropped the idea and returned to St. Louis.) (Note: La Barge, Wyoming is named for Capt. LaBarge's father.) Creation of Idaho Territory in 1863 induced a name change to Idaho City. With the 1864 designation of Montana Territory, Deer Lodge City became the choice. Montana's first territorial legislature defined most of the boundaries of Deer Lodge County, establishing the county seat at the placer mining camp of Silver Bow City, near Butte. In September 1865, county voters transferred the seat to Deer Lodge City.

During the first half of the 1860s, Granville Stuart described valley social life as including many gay dances and parties, which was the way of the Metis. By 1866, Johnny Grant and many of his fellow Metis had become disenchanted with their increasingly numerous neighbors from "the States". In that year, Grant sold most of his Deer Lodge Valley holdings to Conrad Kohrs and in 1867 led a mass exodus of Metis families to the Red River country of Manitoba, Canada. (Note: Grant reported that his party had 62 wagons, 12 carts and about 500 horses. There were 106 men plus their families. People were bound variously for Manitoba or for "the states") (Note: A large and well-armed force was considered necessary as they were passing through territory controlled by Blackfeet and Sioux.)

In 1869, the Territorial Prison was located at Deer Lodge. Also that year, the town site plat for Deer Lodge City was recorded. In 1878, Montana Collegiate Institute was established at Deer Lodge City. It opened for classes in 1883 and closed in 1914.

Attorney Horace Clagett, of the Deer Lodge firm Clagett and Dixon, was elected U.S. Representative from Montana Territory for the 1871–73 term. He was defeated for reelection by Martin Maginnis. Clagett was noted for introducing the legislation establishing Yellowstone National Park. Clagett's partner, William W. Dixon, later moved to Butte and upset Thomas H. Carter in 1891 to serve a single term as U.S. Representative from the State of Montana.

Clagett and Dixon platted the first addition to Deer Lodge City in 1872. Perhaps its most prominent building was the former St. Joseph's Hospital. (Note: W. B. Dance's addition was also platted in 1872.)

=== State of Montana, Powell County ===
Deer Lodge City was incorporated in 1888, with a mayor and aldermen as officers. Montana achieved statehood in 1889 and a battle ensued between Helena and Anaconda over the location of the capitol in which Helena finally triumphed in 1894. In 1896, Anaconda took the Deer Lodge County seat away from Deer Lodge. This began a battle which culminated in the creation of Powell County in 1901, with its county seat at Deer Lodge. (Note: In 1894, the name 'Deer Lodge City' was changed to 'Deer Lodge'.) (Note: On March 8, 1901, an act of the state legislature changed the names of Deer Lodge County to Daly County and Powell County to Deer Lodge County. On April 8, 1901, this action was nullified by the Montana Supreme Court, reverting the two counties to their previous names)

=== Frank Conley ===
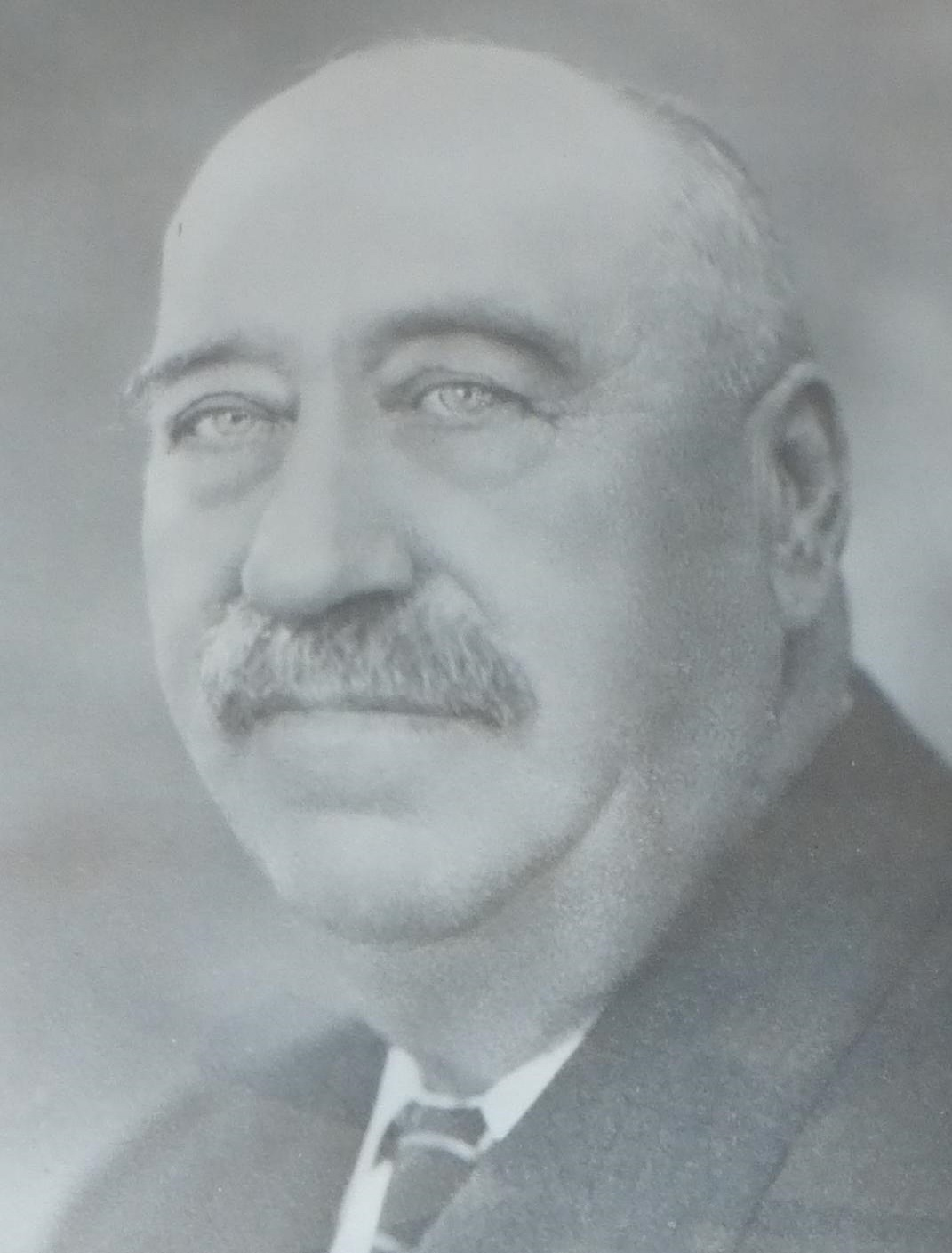
Mayoral portrait of Frank Conley, mayor of Deer Lodge, Montana (with breaks) from 1892 until 1928

After statehood, the State of Montana let a contract to run Montana State Prison, which was awarded to Frank Conley and Thomas McTague. They held the contract until 1908. In that year, the State took over running Montana State Prison, appointing Frank Conley as warden. Conley remained in that capacity until 1921, when Governor Joseph M. Dixon replaced Conley with M. W. Potter. The Governor then commissioned an investigation of Conley's administration. This resulted in the MacDonald Report, which would be used as the basis for a civil lawsuit by the State of Montana against Conley. The year following, Montana Attorney General Wellington Rankin sued Conley for misuse of state funds and materials, in the case State of Montana vs Frank Conley. The case took three months to try and resulted in the State of Montana being ordered to reimburse Conley. Deer Lodge City celebrated with a victory party.

Frank Conley was elected the fifth (1892–93), seventh (1895–1903) and tenth (1907–1928) mayor of Deer Lodge City. When he resigned for the last time, an article in the Billings Gazette called him 'the longest serving mayor in American history'. Mayor Conley was instrumental in bringing the division headquarters and shops of the Milwaukee Road to Deer Lodge City in 1910. Over the next decade, he presided over upbuilding the town's infrastructure to accommodate the rapidly expanding population. He was also responsible for the building of the City Hall.

=== Montana State Prison ===
Opened in 1871, the Montana State Prison has been an economic cornerstone for the community since its founding. In 1908, inmates W. A. Hayes and George Rock killed guard John Robinson and seriously wounded Warden Conley in an attempted prison breakout. In 1959, a prolonged riot occurred at the prison, led by Jerry Miles and Lee Smart, which resulted in the slaying of Deputy Warden Ted Rothe and the eventual suicides of Miles and Smart. All inmates were moved in 1977–79 to a new state prison facility outside of Deer Lodge. The town of Deer Lodge employs the Powell County Museum & Arts Foundation to manage the old facility as a museum.

=== Superfund site ===
In the 1870s, Butte developed into a rich silver mining camp. Marcus Daly's discovery of rich copper veins in his Anaconda mine launched the Copper Kings era at Butte. In 1883, Daly established his smelter facilities at newly platted Anaconda, Montana. Anaconda immediately became Deer Lodge County's major population center and employer. Smelting activities at Butte and Anaconda left behind enormous amounts of toxic wastes. Flooding on Silver Bow Creek and Warm Springs Creek, particularly in the great valley flood of 1908, (Note: Significant flooding in the valley also occurred in 1887, 1892, 1894, 1899 and 1902.) spread toxic wastes from Butte through Deer Lodge City, to the Milltown Dam, (Note: One reason the earlier floods had less obvious impact was that the Milltown Dam didn't exist until early 1908, when W. A. Clark had it constructed to support his lumber mill at the site.) just east of Missoula. As a result of legal actions begun in 1983 and culminating in 2008, the course of the Clark Fork River from Anaconda to the Milltown Dam was declared to be a Superfund cleanup site. Cleanup costs are financed from the settlement with ARCO (now BP-ARCO). (Note: As of 2016, fish are reported to be in the Deer Lodge River and white-tailed deer are frequently seen in the valley.) (Note: The clean-up of the area of Butte and Silver Bow Creek down to Anaconda is a separate superfund site.)

=== Economic decline ===
In 1961, the Milwaukee Road ended its Olympian Hiawatha passenger trains. Limited passenger service between Minneapolis and Deer Lodge continued until 1964, at which time all Milwaukee Road passenger service to Deer Lodge ended. (Note: The previous major highway through the Deer Lodge Valley, US 10, ran down Main Street in Deer Lodge. Both US 10 and the Milwaukee Road contributed patrons for Deer Lodge businesses. Also, I90 made it easier for people in the Deer Lodge area to get to Butte and Missoula to do business.)

In the 1970s, the Anaconda Copper Company suffered financial setbacks which ultimately caused its 1977 merger with ARCO. By 1982, ARCO had closed down the smelter at Anaconda and stopped mining copper at Butte. (Note: A number of smelter employees lived in Deer Lodge.) In 1980, the Milwaukee Road shut down its western extension. All of its infrastructure from Seattle, Washington to Miles City, Montana was torn out, including the rails themselves. (Note: The Milwaukee Road was perhaps the biggest employer in Deer Lodge.)

== Geography ==
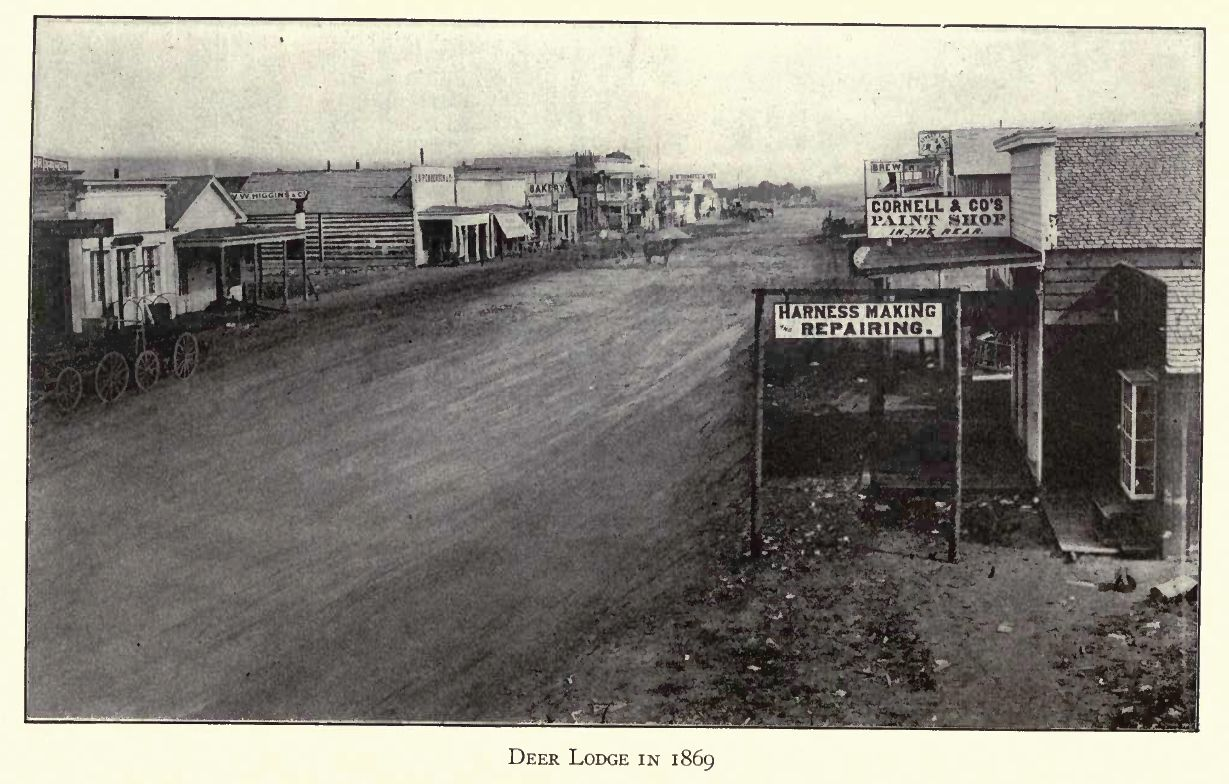
Deer Lodge in 1869

According to the United States Census Bureau, the city has a total area of 1.44 square miles (3.73 km^{2}), all land.

Small creeks can be found in and near town, such as Cottonwood Creek and Peterson Creek.

=== Climate ===
This climatic region is typified by large seasonal and diurnal temperature differences owing to its high elevation and dry conditions throughout the year. The city is marked by warm to hot summers and cold—sometimes severely cold—winters inherent in microthermal climates.

Climate data for Deer Lodge, Montana, 1991–2020 normals, extremes 1893–present
Month	Jan	Feb	Mar	Apr	May	Jun	Jul	Aug	Sep	Oct	Nov	Dec	Year
Record high °F (°C)	62 (17)	69 (21)	73 (23)	84 (29)	94 (34)	100 (38)	108 (42)	103 (39)	99 (37)	87 (31)	73 (23)	66 (19)	108 (42)
Mean maximum °F (°C)	50.6 (10.3)	52.9 (11.6)	62.6 (17.0)	73.5 (23.1)	80.8 (27.1)	86.4 (30.2)	91.9 (33.3)	91.2 (32.9)	86.8 (30.4)	76.7 (24.8)	60.6 (15.9)	50.3 (10.2)	93.1 (33.9)
Mean daily maximum °F (°C)	33.2 (0.7)	36.0 (2.2)	44.3 (6.8)	52.9 (11.6)	62.2 (16.8)	68.5 (20.3)	79.1 (26.2)	79.4 (26.3)	69.6 (20.9)	55.4 (13.0)	40.2 (4.6)	31.3 (−0.4)	54.3 (12.4)
Daily mean °F (°C)	22.0 (−5.6)	24.5 (−4.2)	31.8 (−0.1)	39.4 (4.1)	47.9 (8.8)	54.1 (12.3)	61.6 (16.4)	60.8 (16.0)	52.1 (11.2)	40.6 (4.8)	28.3 (−2.1)	20.9 (−6.2)	40.3 (4.6)
Mean daily minimum °F (°C)	10.7 (−11.8)	13.1 (−10.5)	19.3 (−7.1)	25.8 (−3.4)	33.7 (0.9)	39.8 (4.3)	44.2 (6.8)	42.2 (5.7)	34.6 (1.4)	25.8 (−3.4)	16.3 (−8.7)	10.5 (−11.9)	26.3 (−3.1)
Mean minimum °F (°C)	−14.7 (−25.9)	−10.3 (−23.5)	0.9 (−17.3)	11.5 (−11.4)	18.4 (−7.6)	28.3 (−2.1)	34.0 (1.1)	29.8 (−1.2)	20.9 (−6.2)	7.5 (−13.6)	−4.4 (−20.2)	−12.9 (−24.9)	−23.2 (−30.7)
Record low °F (°C)	−39 (−39)	−41 (−41)	−29 (−34)	−8 (−22)	7 (−14)	22 (−6)	20 (−7)	19 (−7)	9 (−13)	−15 (−26)	−38 (−39)	−42 (−41)	−42 (−41)
Average precipitation inches (mm)	0.48 (12)	0.68 (17)	1.28 (33)	1.08 (27)	2.19 (56)	2.66 (68)	1.51 (38)	1.32 (34)	1.35 (34)	1.00 (25)	0.51 (13)	0.50 (13)	14.56 (370)
Source 1: NOAA
Source 2: National Weather Service

== Demographics ==
Historical population
Census	Pop.	Note	%±
1870	788		—
1880	941		19.4%
1890	1,463		55.5%
1900	1,324		−9.5%
1910	2,570		94.1%
1920	3,780		47.1%
1930	3,510		−7.1%
1940	3,278		−6.6%
1950	3,779		15.3%
1960	4,681		23.9%
1970	4,306		−8.0%
1980	4,023		−6.6%
1990	3,378		−16.0%
2000	3,421		1.3%
2010	3,111		−9.1%
2020	2,938		−5.6%
source: U.S. Decennial Census

=== 2020 census ===
As of the 2020 census, Deer Lodge had a population of 2,938. Deer Lodge had lost more than one third of its peak census population of 1960. (Note: Within Powell County in the 2020 census, Deer Lodge was the only incorporated town.) The median age was 47.0 years. 20.7% of residents were under the age of 18 and 23.8% of residents were 65 years of age or older. For every 100 females there were 100.7 males, and for every 100 females age 18 and over there were 103.2 males age 18 and over.

0.0% of residents lived in urban areas, while 100.0% lived in rural areas.

There were 1,322 households in Deer Lodge, of which 24.4% had children under the age of 18 living in them. Of all households, 40.0% were married-couple households, 25.9% were households with a male householder and no spouse or partner present, and 28.4% were households with a female householder and no spouse or partner present. About 37.2% of all households were made up of individuals and 16.8% had someone living alone who was 65 years of age or older.

There were 1,485 housing units, of which 11.0% were vacant. The homeowner vacancy rate was 2.3% and the rental vacancy rate was 6.0%.

Racial composition as of the 2020 census
Race	Number	Percent
White	2,631	89.6%
Black or African American	4	0.1%
American Indian and Alaska Native	48	1.6%
Asian	16	0.5%
Native Hawaiian and Other Pacific Islander	3	0.1%
Some other race	6	0.2%
Two or more races	230	7.8%
Hispanic or Latino (of any race)	88	3.0%

=== 2010 census ===
As of the census of 2010, there were 3,111 people, 1,386 households, and 847 families residing in the city. The population density was 2,160.4 inhabitants per square mile (834.1/km^{2}). There were 1,549 housing units at an average density of 1,075.7 per square mile (415.3/km^{2}). The racial makeup of the city was 96.8% White, 0.6% African American, 0.8% Native American, 0.6% Asian, and 1.1% from two or more races. Hispanic or Latino of any race were 1.2% of the population.

There were 1,386 households, of which 27.9% had children under the age of 18 living with them, 43.9% were married couples living together, 12.2% had a female householder with no husband present, 5.0% had a male householder with no wife present, and 38.9% were non-families. 35.1% of all households were made up of individuals, and 15.6% had someone living alone who was 65 years of age or older. The average household size was 2.19 and the average family size was 2.79.

The median age in the city was 45.7 years. 22.3% of residents were under the age of 18; 6.3% were between the ages of 18 and 24; 20.3% were from 25 to 44; 30.4% were from 45 to 64; and 20.8% were 65 years of age or older. The gender makeup of the city was 49.7% male and 50.3% female.

=== 2000 census ===
As of the census of 2000, there were 3,421 people, 1,442 households, and 911 families residing in the city. The population density was 2,369.3 inhabitants per square mile (914.8/km^{2}). There were 1,593 housing units at an average density of 1,103.3 per square mile (426.0/km^{2}). The racial makeup of the city was 95.67% White, 0.03% African American, 1.02% Native American, 0.61% Asian, 0.61% from other races, and 2.05% from two or more races. Hispanic or Latino of any race were 1.84% of the population.

There were 1,442 households, out of which 29.3% had children under the age of 18 living with them, 49.7% were married couples living together, 9.2% had a female householder with no husband present, and 36.8% were non-families. 32.1% of all households were made up of individuals, and 15.7% had someone living alone who was 65 years of age or older. The average household size was 2.32 and the average family size was 2.93.

In the city, the population was spread out, with 25.3% under the age of 18, 6.7% from 18 to 24, 25.1% from 25 to 44, 23.6% from 45 to 64, and 19.3% who were 65 years of age or older. The median age was 41 years. For every 100 females there were 93.1 males. For every 100 females age 18 and over, there were 88.2 males.

The median income for a household in the city was $29,859, and the median income for a family was $36,108. Males had a median income of $27,903 versus $20,227 for females. The per capita income for the city was $14,883. About 8.7% of families and 10.9% of the population were below the poverty line, including 13.3% of those under age 18 and 5.4% of those age 65 or over.

== Arts and culture ==
The Grant-Kohrs Ranch National Historic Site provides tours and presentations. The site is also a working ranch.

There are three community parks in town and a skate park. Arrowstone Park has paved riverfront walking trails, a fishing pier, and a boat ramp.

Every August the Powell County Fairgrounds hosts the Tri-County Fair. The counties are Powell County, Deer Lodge County, and Granite County. Events include two days of rodeo along with a ranch rodeo, 4-H displays, and local produce and craft judging. The Fairgrounds is also the location of the Big Sky Draft Horse Expo. The Expo aims to entertain as well as educate the public about draft horses and mules.

The William K. Kohrs Memorial Library, built in Deer Lodge in 1902, is "the only dedicated public library in Powell County." The Kohrs library is modeled after the Carnegie Libraries. It was built for $30,000 by pioneer cattle baron Conrad Kohrs and his wife Augusta as a memorial to their son. The Kohrs wanted the gift to be completely free to the city and so presented it fully furnished and stocked with books. In 2012 the library was struggling financially, and operated without a library director.

== Government ==
The city has a mayor and city council. The council has two council members for each of its four wards. James Jess became mayor in 2022. He was successful in his re-election in November 2025.

The United States Postal Service operates the Deer Lodge Post Office.

The Montana Department of Corrections operates the current Montana State Prison facility in a nearby unincorporated area in Powell County, near Deer Lodge.

== Education ==
Deer Lodge School District has two components: Deer Lodge Elementary School District and Powell County High School District. All of Deer Lodge is in the Deer Lodge Elementary School District and the Powell County High School District.

Deer Lodge Schools educates students from kindergarten through 12th grade. In 2022, the Deer Lodge Elementary District, which includes students from K-8th grades, had 400 students. High school education in Powell County is served by Powell County High School located in Deer Lodge. In 2022, the high school had 175 students enrolled. The school currently competes athletically in the 6B conference with Superior, Missoula Loyola, Valley Christian, Darby and Florence. Although being in existence since 1903 the school won its first athletic team state championship in golf in 2005. The team name is the Wardens.

== Infrastructure ==
Deer Lodge-City-County Airport is a public use airport located 2 miles west of town. The nearest commercial airport is Bert Mooney Airport in Butte.

Deer Lodge Medical Center is a critical access hospital located in town.

== Media ==
The Silver State Post owned by Mullen Newspaper Company is Powell County's only newspaper. KQRV (96.9 FM) is a local radio station licensed in Deer Lodge.

=== Film credits ===
Deer Lodge has been a filming location for a number of movies including:

- Rancho Deluxe (1975)
- Heaven's Gate (1980)
- Fast-Walking (1982)
- Runaway Train (1985)
- Diggstown (1992)
- F.T.W. (1994)
- Love Comes to the Executioner (2006)
- Iron Ridge (2008)
- The Unholy Trinity (2024)

=== UFO activity ===
In a 2004 documentary titled The Secret of Redgate by Lynda J. Cowen and Jim Marrs, a number of Deer Lodge residents explain about their experiences with extraterrestrial beings and the rumors surrounding these events. These occurrences, which date back some fifty years from the date of the film, took place at a location named Redgate on the eastside of Deer Lodge. Another film was produced about the area in 2022.

In 2019 a local man received national attention for an image appearing on his trail cam in the Redgate area.

== Notable people ==
The following individuals are either notable current or former residents of Deer Lodge.

- John Bozeman, founder of Bozeman, Montana
- William H. Clagett, lawyer, U.S. Representative
- William Andrews Clark, US Senator – 1901–07, Copper King
- Pierre-Jean De Smet, established St. Mary's Mission
- William W. Dixon, lawyer and U.S. Representative
- Eric Funk, Composer and professor at Montana State University
- Kevin S. Giles, newspaper journalist and author
- Phil Jackson, NBA player and coach
- Conrad Kohrs, co-founder of Deer Lodge
- Elizabeth Lochrie, artist, muralist, and lecturer.
- John Mullan, surveyor of possible transcontinental railroad routes
- Jesse Mullen, Montana media tycoon, politician and columnist
- Jean Parker, actress, born Lois Mae Green in Deer Lodge
- Edgar Samuel Paxson, frontier artist
- Jean'ne Shreeve, chemist
- Granville Stuart, co-founder of Deer Lodge, Montana
- Patricia Nell Warren, writer, great-granddaughter of Conrad Kohrs
- Darrell Ward, reality television personality and truck driver

== See also ==
- List of municipalities in Montana
