= Grower =

Grower may refer to:

- Farmer
- Sharecropper
- Stockgrower (disambiguation)

== See also ==
- Grow (disambiguation)
