= Cattle baron =

Wealthy and influential owner of beef cattle

Cattle baron is a historic term for a local businessman and landowner who possessed great power or influence through the operation of a large ranch with many beef cattle. Cattle barons in the late 19th century United States were also sometimes referred to as cowmen, stockmen, or just ranchers. In Australia, similar individuals owned large cattle stations. A similar phenomenon occurred in part of Canada in the early twentieth century.

== Notable examples ==
In the American Old West:

- Otto Franc
- Charles Goodnight. Essayist and historian J. Frank Dobie said that Goodnight "approached greatness more nearly than any other cowman of history."
- John Chisum
- Tom McCall
- Conrad Kohrs; see Grant-Kohrs Ranch National Historic Site
- Oliver Loving
- James Dolan
- Susan McSween
- Frank Wolcott
- Margaret Borland
- Matthew Rohrbach see the belt buckle of the corn belt

In Australia:

- Peter Menegazzo
- Sidney Kidman

In Canada:

- The Big Four (Calgary) (four businessmen: two ranchers, a meat packer, and a brewer who founded the Calgary Stampede, the world's richest rodeo)
  - George Lane, rancher
  - A. E. Cross, rancher Bar U Ranch
  - Patrick Burns
  - Archibald J. McLean

In England:

- Jonathan Wall (Baron of Cambridge who held a significant amount of land on which he kept several thousand cattle)

== In popular culture ==
Cattle barons appear in numerous Western novels and films, often as villains. Such films include Broken Lance (1954), Lawman (1971) and Heaven's Gate (1980). In the Fallout video game series, Brahmin barons are exactly the same as cattle barons but herd mutated livestock instead of normal animals.

== See also ==
- Cattle Baron's Ball, a Dallas, Texas fundraising event
- Wyoming Stock Growers Association
- Aztec Land & Cattle Company (1884–1902)
- Willamette Cattle Company
- Santa Fe Ring
- Empire Ranch
