= U.S. Route 10 in Montana =

Former section of US Numbered Highway in Montana, United States

U.S. Highway 10

Route information
- Maintained by MDT
- Length: 700 mi (1,100 km)
- Existed: November 11, 1926–June 9, 1986

Major junctions
- West end: US 93 / MT 200 in Wye
- I-15 in Butte; US 191 in Bozeman; US 89 in Livingston; US 191 in Big Timber; US 212 / US 310 in Laurel; I-90 / US 87 / US 212 in Lockwood; US 12 in Miles City
- East end: I-94 / US 10 near Beach, North Dakota

Location
- Country: United States
- State: Montana

Highway system
- United States Numbered Highway System; List; Special; Divided; Montana Highway System; Interstate; US; State; Secondary
| ← MT 7 | → US 12 |

U.S. Route 10 (US 10), was a 700-mile (1,100 km) section of U.S. Numbered Highway in Montana, United States from 1926 to 1986. It was mostly replaced with Interstate 90 (I-90) and I-94; sections in major city centers were replaced by business routes and state highways. It was the longest segment of US 10 in one state.

== Route description ==
US 10 in Montana started on the Idaho border in Lookout Pass. As it traveled through the mountains, it traveled through several small towns, including St. Regis, where it intersected Montana Highway 461 (MT 461). From here, it continued east toward Missoula. In the Missoula area, US 10 would intersect US 10A (later MT 200), US 93, US 12, and MT 20 (later MT 200). The route within Missoula still exists and is signed as I-90 Business (I-90 Bus.). US 10 and US 12 ran concurrently east of Missoula until US 12 split off in Garrison. An alternate route (MT 1) split from US 10 in Drummond and rejoined US 10 east of Anaconda. After leaving Anaconda, US 10 would continue to travel east toward Butte. Shortly before entering Butte, US 10 would intersect US 91 (later I-15) and US 91 would travel concurrently with US 10 into downtown Butte.

== History ==
Before the establishment of the United States Numbered Highway System, a transcontinental road called the Yellowstone Trail ran through Montana. This trail overlapped much of what would become US 10 and later I-90. US 10 completely replaced the Yellowstone Trail in Montana by 1930.

US 10 was one of the first U.S. Highways established in 1926. Over time, it was slowly upgraded to freeway standards after the Interstate Highway System was introduced in 1956. Eventually, the majority of US 10 (except a section later designated MT 2) ran concurrently with the I-90 and I-94. In 1986, the US 10 designation was completely decommissioned in Montana. Many sections of the former route that were not upgraded to freeway standards are now either signed as I-90 Bus., I-94 Bus., as a Montana Secondary Highway, or simply "Old U.S. Highway 10" or some derivative of it.

=== US 10N ===
U.S. Highway 10N
- Length: 112 mi (180 km)
- Existed: November 11, 1926–1959

Until 1959, US 10 split into two sections. US 10N was replaced by MT 287 and US 12. US 10S became the mainline US 10 route after US 10N was decommissioned in 1959.

=== Decommissioning ===
In 1977, US 10 in Idaho was decommissioned from the intersection with US 95 Alternate east of Coeur d'Alene, Idaho, to intersection with US 93/MT 200 in Wye. In 1986, Montana and North Dakota truncated US 10 to its current terminus in West Fargo, North Dakota, and also decommissioned US 10A. After US 10 was decommissioned, Montana created MT 2 to replace a portion of former US 10 from Butte to Three Forks. MT 1 was created to replace former US 10A from Drummond to Anaconda.

== Major intersections ==
This list follows the final non-freeway alignment in 1960.

| County | Location | mi | km | Destinations | Notes |
|---|---|---|---|---|---|
| Mineral | Saltese | | | US 10 west – Coeur d'Alene, Idaho | Continuation into Idaho |
| Mineral | St. Regis | | | S-461 to US 10A – Paradise | Southern terminus of S-461 |
| Missoula | Wye | | | US 93 north / US 10A west – Ravalli, Sandpoint, Idaho | Eastern terminus of US 10A / Western terminus of US 93 concurrency |
| Missoula | Missoula | | | US 93 south / US 12 east – Stevensville | Eastern end of US 93 concurrency / Western end of US 12 concurrency / Western terminus of US 12 |
| Missoula | Milltown | | | MT 20 east – Great Falls | |
| Granite | Drummond | | | US 10A east – Anaconda | |
| Powell | Garrison | | | US 12 east – Helena | Eastern end of US 12 concurrency |
| Deer Lodge | Warm Springs | | | MT 48 | |
| Deer Lodge | Anaconda | | | US 10A west | |
| Silver Bow | Butte | | | US 91 south – Dillon | Western end of US 91 concurrency |
| Silver Bow | Butte | | | US 91 north – Helena | Eastern end of US 91 concurrency |
| Jefferson | Whitehall | | | MT 41 south – Twin Bridges | |
| Gallatin | Three Forks | | | MT 287 south – Yellowstone National Park | Western end of MT 287 concurrency |
| Gallatin | Three Forks | | | MT 287 north – Helena | Eastern end of MT 287 concurrency |
| Gallatin | Three Forks | | | S-286 | |
| Gallatin | Bozeman | | | US 191 | Northern terminus of US 191 |
| Park | Livingston | | | US 89 south – Yellowstone National Park | Western end of US 89 concurrency |
| Park | Livingston | | | US 89 north – Great Falls | Eastern end of US 89 concurrency |
| Sweet Grass | Big Timber | | | MT 19 | |
| Yellowstone | Laurel | | | US 212 west / US 310 east / S-789 | Western end of US 212 concurrency |
| Yellowstone | Billings | | | MT 3 | |
| Yellowstone | Billings | | | US 87 south | Southern end of US 87 concurrency |
| Yellowstone | Billings | | | US 87 north | Northern end of US 87 concurrency |
| Rosebud | Forsyth | | | US 12 | Western end of US 12 concurrency / eastern terminus of US 312 |
| Custer | Miles City | | | MT 22 | |
| Custer | Miles City | | | US 212 | Northern terminus of US 212 |
| Custer | Miles City | | | US 12 east – Baker | Eastern end of US 12 concurrency |
| Dawson | West Glendive | | | MT 20S | |
| Dawson | Glendive | | | MT 16 | |
| Wibaux | Wibaux | | | US 10 east – Dickinson, North Dakota | Continuation into North Dakota |
1.000 mi = 1.609 km; 1.000 km = 0.621 mi: Concurrency terminus

== Related routes ==
- U.S. Route 310
- U.S. Route 10 Alternate (Washington–Montana)
- Montana Highway 1

== See also ==
- List of U.S. Highways in Montana
