= Montana Highway 135 =

State highway in Montana, United States

Montana Highway 135
- MT 135 highlighted in red

Route information
- Maintained by MDT
- Length: 21.549 mi (34.680 km)
- Existed: c. 1978–present

Major junctions
- West end: I-90 at St. Regis
- East end: MT 200 near Paradise

Location
- Country: United States
- State: Montana
- Counties: Mineral, Sanders

Highway system
- Montana Highway System; Interstate; US; State; Secondary
← MT 117	→ MT 141

Montana Highway 135 (MT 135) is a 21.5-mile-long (34.6 km) state highway in western Montana. It begins at Interstate 90 (I-90) in St. Regis and ends at MT 200 near Paradise. The highway runs along the bank of the Clark Fork River and through Lolo National Forest.

== History ==
Secondary Highway 461
- Location: St. Regis, Montana to Paradise, Montana
- Existed: c. 1960–c. 1977

From 1960 to 1978, a secondary route ran on the modern route of MT 135. It was a connection between US 10 and US 10A and later Montana Highway 200. There was a toll ferry cross the Clark Fork River.

== Route description ==
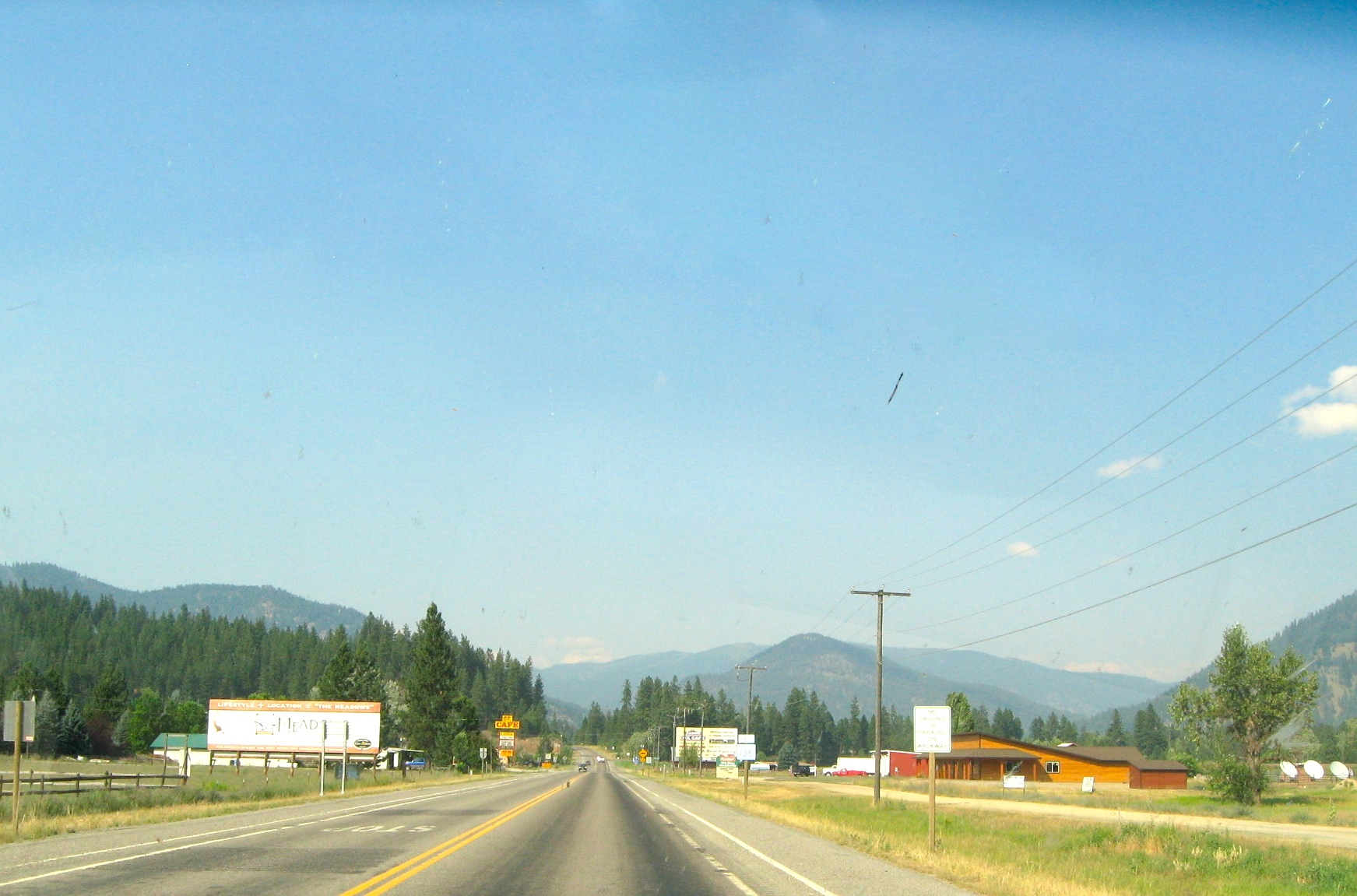
MT 135 as it exits St. Regis

MT 135 begins in St. Regis at exit 33 along I-90. Almost immediately, it comes to a four-way stop where it intersects the former U.S. Highway 10. From there, the highway heads to the north and northeast through Lolo National Forest and along the northern bank of the Clark Fork River. A line of the Montana Rail Link railroad runs parallel to the highway. Near its midpoint, MT 135 crosses the river and passes beneath the railroad; from there, the road and railroad run along opposite banks of the river. As the river winds, the highway follows closely; near Quinn, the river and road straighten. Just before the highway ends, it exits Lolo National Forest. The highway ends a couple miles east of Paradise at MT 200. Nearby is the mouth of the Clark Fork River, which empties into the Flathead River.

== Major intersections ==
County	Location	mi	km	Destinations	Notes
Mineral	St. Regis	0.000	0.000	I-90 – Missoula, Spokane	Exit 33 on I-90
Sanders	Paradise	21.549	34.680	MT 200 – Thompson Falls, Ravalli	
1.000 mi = 1.609 km; 1.000 km = 0.621 mi
