= U.S. Route 10 Alternate (Washington–Montana) =

Former highway in Washington, Idaho and Montana

U.S. Route 10A
- The 1941 alignment of US 10A highlighted in red and the 1947 alignment of US 10A in blue

Route information
- Auxiliary route of US 10
- Length: 567 mi (Note: The length after the 1947 reroute was 223 miles (359 km).) (912 km)
- Existed: 1941–1967

Major junctions
- West end: I-90 / US 10 in Coeur d'Alene, ID
- US 95 / US 2 in Sandpoint, ID; US 93 in Ravalli, MT
- East end: I-90 / US 10 in Wye, MT

Location
- Country: United States
- States: Washington, Idaho, and Montana

Highway system
- United States Numbered Highway System; List; Special; Divided
- State highways in Washington; Interstate; US; State; Scenic; Pre-1964; 1964 renumbering; Former
- Idaho State Highway System; Interstate; US; State
- Montana Highway System; Interstate; US; State; Secondary

U.S. Route 10A (US 10A) was an alternate route of US 10 that existed between 1941 and 1967. From 1941 to 1947, it ran between Seattle, Washington, and Missoula, Montana. Since its decommissioning, it has been replaced by Idaho State Highway 200 (SH-200), Montana Highway 200 (MT 200), and US 2. By 1947, it had been rerouted to run concurrently with US 95, as the majority of its former route had been replaced by the western extension of US 2 from Bonners Ferry, Idaho, to Everett, Washington. This change led the highway to begin in Coeur d'Alene, Idaho, rather than in Seattle. It would remain in this configuration until its decommissioning in 1967, as I-90 gradually replaced US 10.

== Route description ==
=== Washington ===
US 10A split from US 10 in Seattle. The highway would then follow US 99 (modern Washington State Route 99) north to Everett. There it separated from US 99. It then traveled east across the Cascade Range via Stevens Pass to central Washington. In Spokane, the highway followed US 195 to Sandpoint, Idaho.

=== Idaho ===
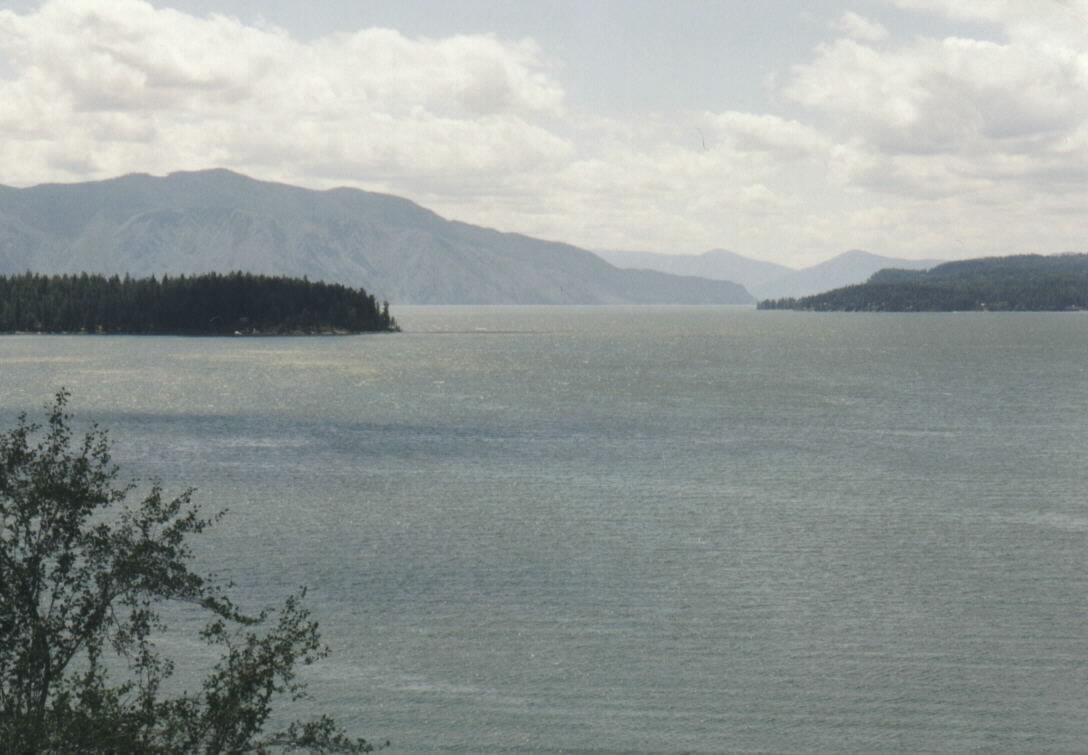
A view of Lake Pend Oreille from US 10A (now SH-200)

In Idaho, US 10A went through Bonner County and the town of Sandpoint. In Sandpoint, US 10A intersected US 95. At the intersection, US 195 terminated, and US 10A would follow the shore of Lake Pend Oreille, serving the communities of Hope and Clark Fork before entering Montana.

==== 1947 reroute ====
After its reroute in 1947, US 10A started in Coeur d'Alene concurrent with US 95. It would follow US 95 north to Sandpoint. At the intersection with US 2, US 10A spilt from US 95 and went east toward Clark Fork.

=== Montana ===
In Montana, the route would then follow through rural northwestern Montana and the towns of Plains and Thompson Falls parallel to the Clark Fork and Flathead rivers. It then intersected US 93 in Ravalli. It then ran concurrently with US 93 south to Wye, where US 10A ended at Desmet Junction intersecting US 10 and US 93.

== History ==
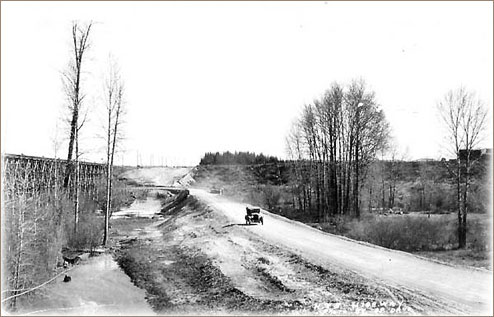
The intersection with US 95 in the early 1920s

US 10A was formed in 1941 as an alternate route of US 10 going through northwestern Montana, northern Idaho, and central Washington. In Washington, it would follow the former route of US 10 through Stevens Pass before it was rerouted in 1939. It served as an artery to isolated communities in those states, such as Clark Fork, Idaho; Plains, Montana; as well as several small towns in central Washington. It also replaced MT 3.

In 1946, representatives of the highway departments of Idaho and Washington proposed an extension of US 2 to Everett that was considered by the American Association of State Highway Officials's U.S. Route Numbering Committee in January 1946; however, the committee vetoed the proposal. The proposal resurfaced during the committee's meeting on December 20, 1946, and US 2 was approved as a replacement for US 10A from Everett to Sandpoint and US 195 from Spokane to Newport; however, US 195 would remain on road maps in Washington until at least 1951. In 1947, following the extension of US 2, US 10A was rerouted to start in Coeur d'Alene along US 95.

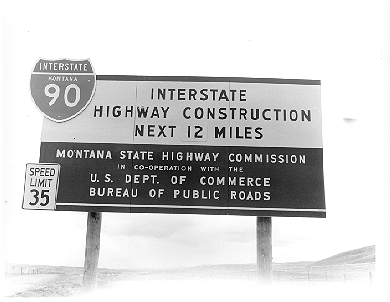
US 10A was decommissioned as US 10 itself was being replaced by I-90.

US 10A was decommissioned in 1967, as its parent route, US 10, was being replaced by Interstate 90 (I-90). After its decommissioning, the states of Idaho and Montana had replaced the former US 10A route with state highways. Montana renumbered MT 20, which had already been routed on US 10A by 1956, to MT 200. Idaho established SH-200 to replace US 10A a year later. Both highways were a part of a series of similarly numbered routes in Minnesota and North Dakota with the end goal being a unified federal designation.

== Major intersections ==
State	County	Location	mi	km	Destinations	Notes
Washington	King	Seattle			US 10 / US 99	Western end of US 99 concurrency; western terminus
Washington	Snohomish	Everett			US 99	Eastern end of US 99 concurrency
Washington	Chelan	Peshastin			US 97 / PSH 2	Western end of US 97 and PSH 2 concurrency
Washington	Chelan	Wenatchee			US 97	Eastern end of US 97 concurrency
Washington	Spokane	Spokane			US 10 / US 395 / US 195 / PSH 2	Western end of US 195 concurrency; eastern end of PSH 2 concurrency
Washington	Pend Oreille	Newport			PSH 6	PSH 6 became State Route 20 in 1964
Idaho	Bonner	Sandpoint			US 95 / US 195	Eastern end of US 195 concurrency; eastern terminus of US 195
Montana	Sanders	Plains			MT 28	
Montana	Lake	Ravalli			US 93	Western end of US 93 concurrency
Montana	Missoula	Wye			US 10 / US 93	Eastern terminus; Eastern end of US 93 concurrency
1.000 mi = 1.609 km; 1.000 km = 0.621 mi: Concurrency terminus

=== 1947 rerouting ===
State	County	Location	mi	km	Destinations	Notes
Idaho	Kootenai	Coeur d’Alene			I-90 / US 10	Southern end of US 95 concurrency; western terminus
Idaho	Bonner	Sandpoint			US 95 / US 2	Northern end of US 95 concurrency
Montana	Sanders	Plains			MT 28	
Montana	Lake	Ravalli			US 93	Western end of US 93 concurrency
Montana	Missoula	Wye			I-90 / US 10 / US 93	Eastern terminus; eastern end of US 93 concurrency
1.000 mi = 1.609 km; 1.000 km = 0.621 mi: Concurrency terminus
