= U.S. Route 10 =

Discontiguous east-west U.S. route from North Dakota to Michigan

U.S. Route 10
- US 10 highlighted in red

Route information
- Length: 713.18 mi (1,147.75 km)
- Existed: November 11, 1926–present

Major junctions
- West end: I-94 / US 52 at West Fargo, ND
- I-29 / US 81 in Fargo, ND; I-35W in Mounds View, MN; I-35E / I-94 / US 12 / US 52 / US 61 in St. Paul, MN; I-94 in Osseo, WI; I-39 / US 51 in Stevens Point, WI; I-41 / US 41 in Menasha, WI; I-43 near Manitowoc, WI; US 31 near Ludington, MI; US 131 near Reed City, MI; US 127 near Clare, MI
- East end: I-75 / US 23 near Bay City, MI

Location
- Country: United States
- States: North Dakota, Minnesota, Wisconsin, Michigan

Highway system
- United States Numbered Highway System; List; Special; Divided
← US 9	→ US 11

U.S. Route 10 or U.S. Highway 10 (US 10) is an east–west United States Numbered Highway located in the Midwest and Great Lakes regions of the U.S. Despite the "0" as the last digit in the number, US 10 is no longer a cross-country highway, and it never was a full coast-to-coast route. US 10 was one of the original long-haul highways, running from Detroit to Seattle, but then lost much of its length when new Interstate Highways were built on top of its right-of-way.

US 10 used to be broken into two segments by Lake Michigan. In 2015, the ferry SS Badger between Ludington, Michigan, and Manitowoc, Wisconsin, was officially designated as part of the highway. The ferry operates only between May and October.

The eastern terminus of US 10 is near Bay City, Michigan, at its interchange with Interstate 75 (I-75) (near US 10's milepost 139 and I-75's milepost 162). The western terminus of US 10 is in the city of West Fargo, North Dakota, at its interchange with I-94.

== Route description ==
Lengths
	mi	km
ND	8.04	12.94
MN	275.47	443.33
WI	294.01	473.16
MI	139.66	224.76
Total	713.18	1,147.75

=== North Dakota ===
In the state of North Dakota, US 10 runs for about eight miles (13 km), from I-94/US 52 at exit 343 to the Red River of the North. It is one of the primary east–west streets in West Fargo and Fargo and is called Main Avenue for its entire length in North Dakota. At the Red River, US 10 crosses over a bridge to Moorhead, Minnesota.

=== Minnesota ===
US 10 is a major divided highway for almost all of its length in Minnesota. The road enters Minnesota in Moorhead and travels through Detroit Lakes, Wadena, Staples, Little Falls, St. Cloud, and Elk River. It becomes a freeway in Anoka and passes through the northern suburbs of Minneapolis and Saint Paul, It enters Saint Paul paired with I-35E and exits Saint Paul paired with US 61. It leaves US 61 just north of Hastings as a two-lane highway shortly before entering into Wisconsin.

=== Wisconsin ===
US 10 enters Wisconsin at Prescott and travels southeastward passing Durand, Neillsville, Marshfield, Stevens Point, and Appleton before reaching its eastern terminus near the Lake Michigan shore in Manitowoc. Ferry service between the western and eastern portions of US 10 is provided between May and October by the ferry SS Badger. US 10 is now a four-lane divided highway from State Trunk Highway 80 (WIS 80) two miles (3.2 km) south of Marshfield to I-39. This allows travelers to bypass Hewitt, Auburndale, Blenker, Milladore, Junction City, and downtown Stevens Point. This completes the plan to upgrade US 10 to a freeway or expressway status from Marshfield to Menasha. US 10 is an expressway between Stevens Point and Waupaca. It has been upgraded to a freeway in the Waupaca area and is also a freeway between Fremont and Appleton.

=== Michigan ===
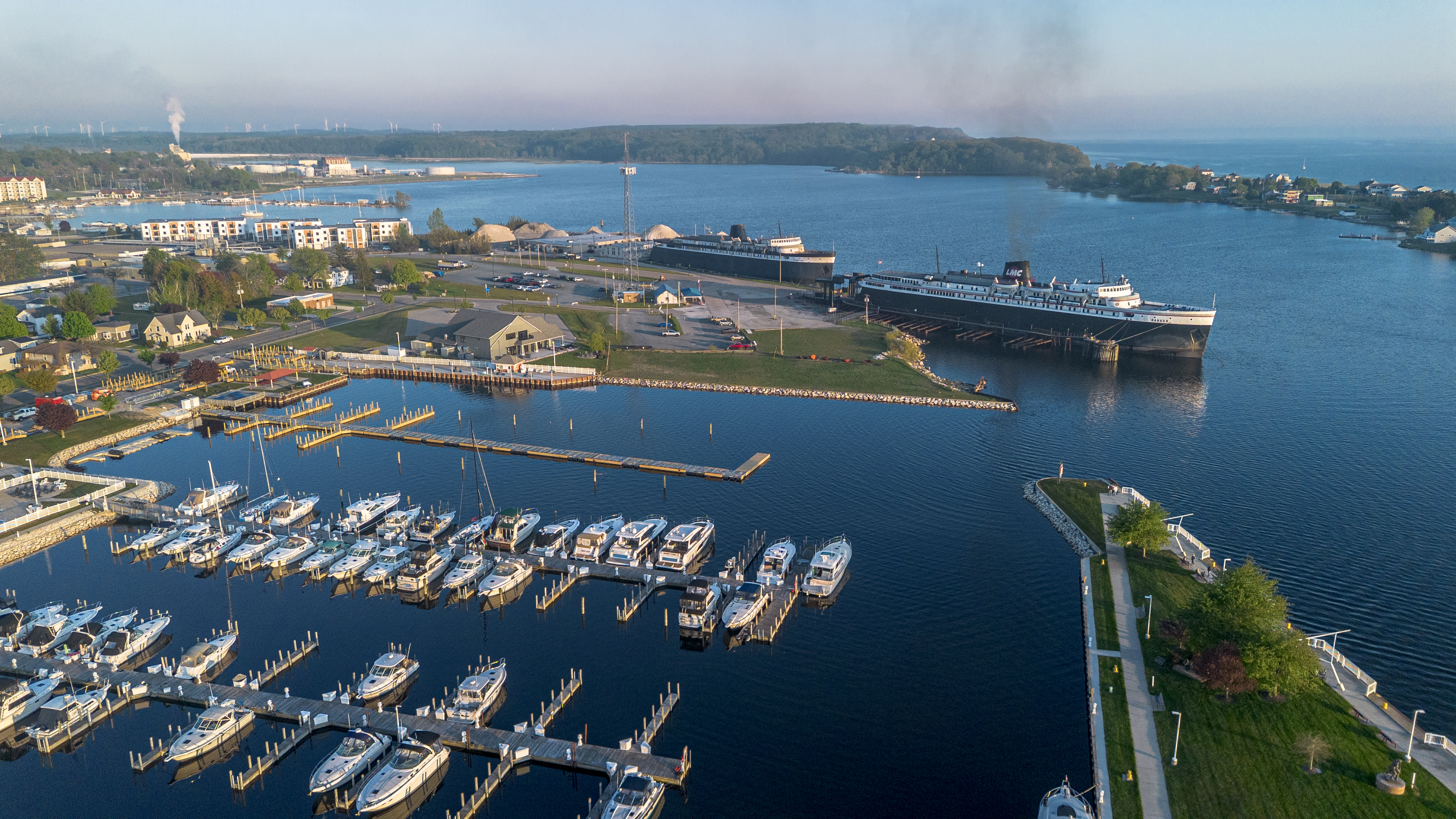
SS Badger docked in Ludington

The western terminus of US 10 in Michigan is Ludington. US 10 runs concurrently with US 31 from the east side of Ludington to Scottville before US 31 turns northward. The road then heads easterly through Baldwin and Reed City before it becomes a freeway west of US 127 near the junction with highway M-115. US 127 and US 10 overlap for a short distance near Clare. US 10 bypasses Midland and terminates at I-75 in Bay City.

== History ==

When the Joint Board on Interstate Highways submitted its report in October 1925 proposing the United States Numbered Highway System, Route No. 10 was planned to travel eastward from Seattle to Minneapolis–St. Paul, then southeast to Chicago, then northeast to Detroit. In the same proposal, U.S. Route 12 was intended to cross US 10 near Minneapolis, travel eastward through Wisconsin, make use of the Lake Michigan ferry connecting Manitowoc, Wisconsin, to Ludington, Michigan, and then travel eastward to the same endpoint in Detroit. In the finalized system, approved on November 11, 1926, these designations east of the Twin Cities were switched, with US 10 using the ferry and US 12 rounding the southern end of Lake Michigan at Chicago.

Much of the former route of US 10 was supplanted by I-90 and I-94 beginning in the 1960s, particularly from Seattle to Fargo. In 1970, Washington replaced its segment of US 10 with State Route 10. In 1977, the portion of US 10 running through the Idaho Panhandle and western Montana, from the intersection with US 95 Alternate east of Coeur d'Alene, Idaho, to the intersection with US 93/MT 200 in Wye, near Missoula, Montana, was decommissioned. In 1986, the segment of US 10 between Wye and West Fargo, North Dakota, was decommissioned, reducing the route to its current western terminus.

Some sections of the old US 10 road still exist in such cities as Bismarck, Missoula, Spokane, and between Cle Elum and Ellensburg as Washington State Route 10 (SR 10). The last section of I-90 to be completed was between Coeur d'Alene and Wallace in the early 1990s. Much of this route was conumbered as both I-90 and US 10 until the final completion of I-90 through Idaho. Some decommissioned sections of US 10 are designated I-90 Business (I-90 Bus.) or I-94 Bus. routes. At least four US 10 Alternate (US 10 Alt.) routes were used, including one from Spokane to Missoula from 1941 to 1967 via Sandpoint, Idaho (represented today by US 2, State Highway 200, MT 200, and US 93), US 10 Alt. between US 10 (4th Avenue S. and Dearborn Street in Seattle) and present-day US 2 in Everett (Rucker Avenue and Hewitt Avenue) along US 99, US 10 Alt. between the western terminus of US 10 and Issaquah along the pre-truncated version of SR 900, and the Pintler Scenic Route through Philipsburg, and Anaconda, renamed MT 1 when Montana's US 10 was decommissioned in 1986. US 10 split between Garrison and Three Forks into US 10N and US 10S from 1936 until 1960. US 10N through Helena and dropping into Three Forks, while the Southern section of the split followed US 10's traditional routing through Deer Lodge and Butte, Montana, to get across the Rocky Mountains. Previous to the split, US 10N was designated as another US 10 Alt.

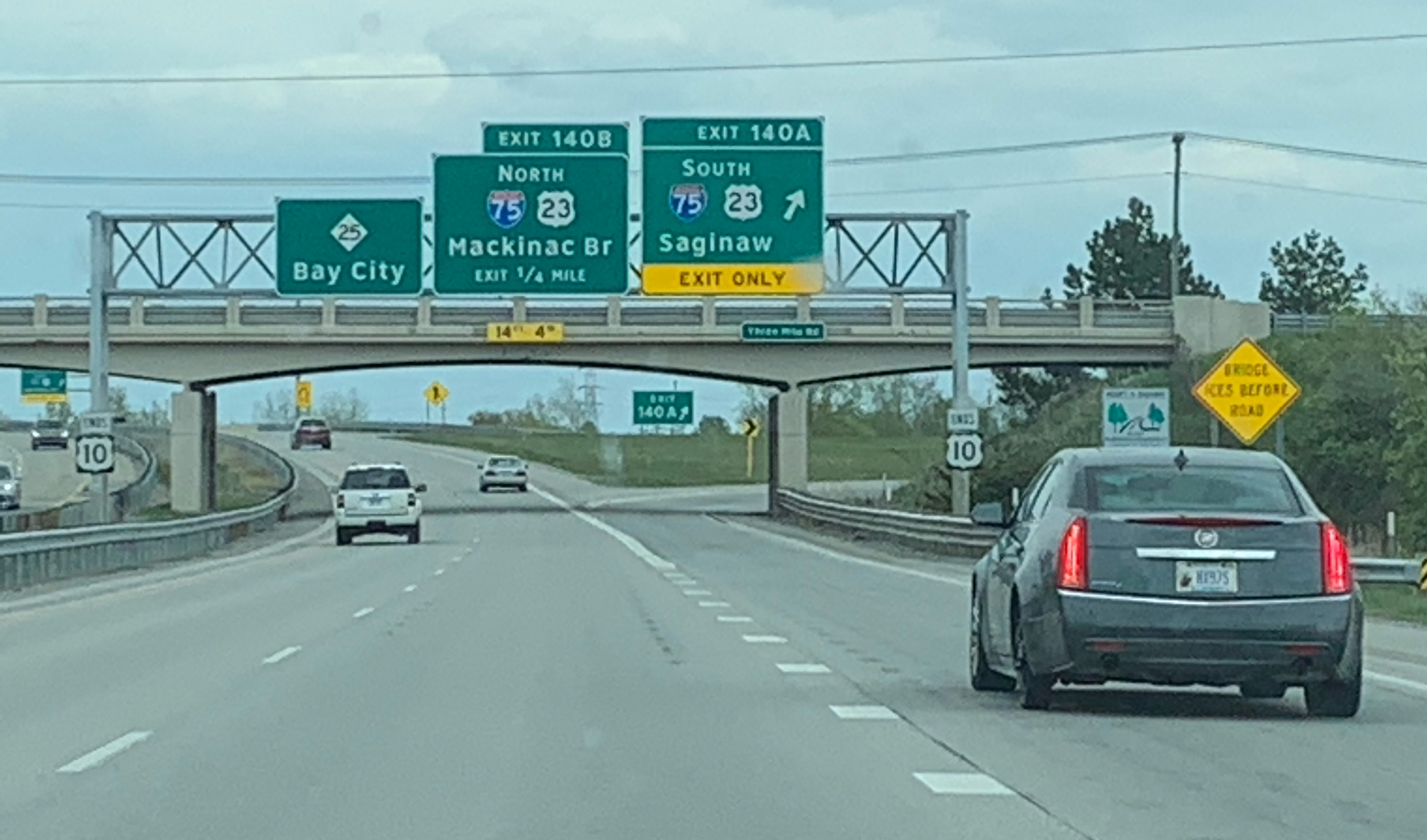
Eastern terminus of US 10 at I-75/US 23 and M-25 in Bay City, Michigan

At the eastern end, US 10 originally went south from Midland to Saginaw, Michigan, on what is now highway M-47. It then joined up with US 23 in Saginaw and continued south until it split from US 23 near Flint. It then continued southeast as the Dixie Highway to Pontiac, where it followed Woodward Avenue, now designated M-1. From there, US 10 continued on an almost straight line to Downtown Detroit, where it intersected US 16, US 25, and US 12.

In the 1960s, US 10 was rerouted to bypass downtown Pontiac to the west, replacing M-58 along Square Lake Road and Telegraph Road, with the downtown route designated Business US 10. In 1970, US 10 was rerouted off Woodward Avenue in Metro Detroit and onto the John C. Lodge Freeway (formerly Business Spur 696, now M-10) and Telegraph Road, where it was concurrent on the latter road with US 24. The segment of US 10 between Detroit and Bay City, Michigan, was decommissioned in 1985, at which point the Lodge Freeway was redesignated to M-10, while the segments of Telegraph Road and Dixie Highway between the northern end of US 24 in Pontiac and the interchange with I-75 in Clarkston were designated an extension of US 24, and the Pontiac business route was changed to Business US 24 as a result.

In 2015, the American Association of State Highway and Transportation Officials officially designated the SS Badger car ferry as part of the highway's official route, joining US 9 as the only two routes with a ferry connection.

== Major intersections ==
North Dakota
I-94 / US 52 in West Fargo
I-29 / US 81 in Fargo
Minnesota
US 75 in Moorhead. The highways travel concurrently through the city.
US 59 in Detroit Lakes
US 71 in Wadena
US 169 in Elk River. The highways travel concurrently to Anoka.
I-35W on the Mounds View–Shoreview city line. The highways travel concurrently to the Mounds View–Arden Hills city line.
I-694 in Arden Hills. The highways travel concurrently to Little Canada.
I-35E / I-694 in Little Canada. I-35E/US 10 travel concurrently to Saint Paul.
I-35E / I-94 / US 52 / US 12 in Saint Paul. I-94/US 10 travel concurrently through the city.
US 61 in Saint Paul. The highways travel concurrently to Denmark Township.
I-494 in Newport
Wisconsin
US 63 west of Ellsworth. The highways travel concurrently to east of Ellsworth.
US 53 west of Osseo. The highways travel concurrently to Osseo.
I-94 in Osseo
US 12 south of Fairchild. The highways travel concurrently to east-southeast of Fairchild.
I-39 / US 51 north-northwest of Stevens Point. The highways travel concurrently to Stevens Point.
US 45 east-southeast of Fremont. The highways travel concurrently for approximately 2.57 miles (4.14 km).
I-41 / US 41 north of Neenah
I-43 northwest of Manitowoc. The highways travel concurrently to west of Manitowoc.
US 151 in Manitowoc
SS Badger in Manitowoc. US 10 utilizes the ship as a car ferry across Lake Michigan to Ludington, Michigan.
Michigan
SS Badger in Ludington.
US 31 in Amber Township. The highways travel concurrently through the township.
US 131 in Richmond Township
US 127 in Grant Township. The highways travel concurrently to Clare.
I-75 / US 23 in Monitor Township
M-25 in Monitor Township

== Related routes ==
US 10 has had alternate routes designated in the past, but none are active as of 2017. A multistate alternate route between Washington and Montana was largely replaced in 1947 by the western extension of US 2 and later decommissioned entirely in 1967.

Between 1926 and 1934, there was a pair of suffixed routes between St. Cloud, Minnesota, and Moorhead, Minnesota. US 10N, the northern half of the pairing, connected St. Cloud, Little Falls, Motley, and Detroit Lakes before reaching Moorhead. US 10S ran from St. Cloud through Alexandria and Fergus Falls before rejoining US 10N at Moorhead. In the mid-1930s, US 52 was extended into Minnesota, and US 10S was renamed to US 52 (now also I-94). US 10N was renamed to US 10.

== See also ==
- U.S. Route 110
- U.S. Route 210
- U.S. Route 310
- U.S. Route 410

Browse numbered routes
← ND 9	ND	→ ND 10
