= U.S. Route 93 =

Highway in the western United States

U.S. Route 93
- US 93 highlighted in red

Route information
- Length: 1,359 mi (2,187 km)
- Existed: November 11, 1926–present

Major junctions
- South end: US 60 in Wickenburg, AZ
- I-40 in Kingman, AZ; I-11 from Arizona–Nevada state line to Las Vegas, NV; US 95 from Boulder City, NV to Las Vegas, NV; I-15 from Las Vegas, NV to North Las Vegas, NV; US 6 / US 50 from Majors Place, NV to Ely, NV; I-80 / US 93 Alt. in Wells, NV; I-84 at Twin Falls, ID; I-90 in Missoula, MT; US 2 in Kalispell, MT
- North end: Highway 93 at the Canada–US border in Roosville, Montana

Location
- Country: United States
- States: Arizona, Nevada, Idaho, Montana

Highway system
- United States Numbered Highway System; List; Special; Divided
← US 92	→ US 94

U.S. Route 93 (US 93) is a major north–south 1,359-mile (2,187 km) U.S. Numbered Highway in the western United States that connects U.S. Route 60 (US 60) in Wickenburg, Arizona with British Columbia Highway 93 at the Canadian border in Roosville, Montana. The highway passes through Kingman, Arizona; Las Vegas, Nevada; Twin Falls, Idaho; and Missoula, Montana.

== Route description ==
Lengths
	mi	km
AZ	199	320
NV	527	848
ID	351	565
MT	288	463
Total	1,365	2,197

=== Arizona ===
US 93 begins at US 60 in Wickenburg, a small town approximately 50 miles (80 km) northwest of Phoenix. Thirty miles (48 km) northwest of Wickenburg, US 93 passes through a large forest of Joshua trees and is thus labeled the Joshua Forest Parkway of Arizona until it reaches Wikieup.

From there, it heads north, eventually merging with Interstate 40 (I-40) to head west to Kingman. US 93 then splits from I-40 in Kingman and heads north to the Hoover Dam. Chloride is located off this highway and Santa Claus is on the western side, about 15 miles (24 km) before the Chloride Road intersection.

This highway was known to be one of the deadliest routes in America until recently in 2026 which ADOT is constructing median, signal light, and pavement improvements. However, there are still sections with potholes north of Kingman and south of hoover dam which can cause travelers flat tires. The years of improvements have made it a much safer road to travel, according to the Federal Highway Administration.

=== Nevada ===
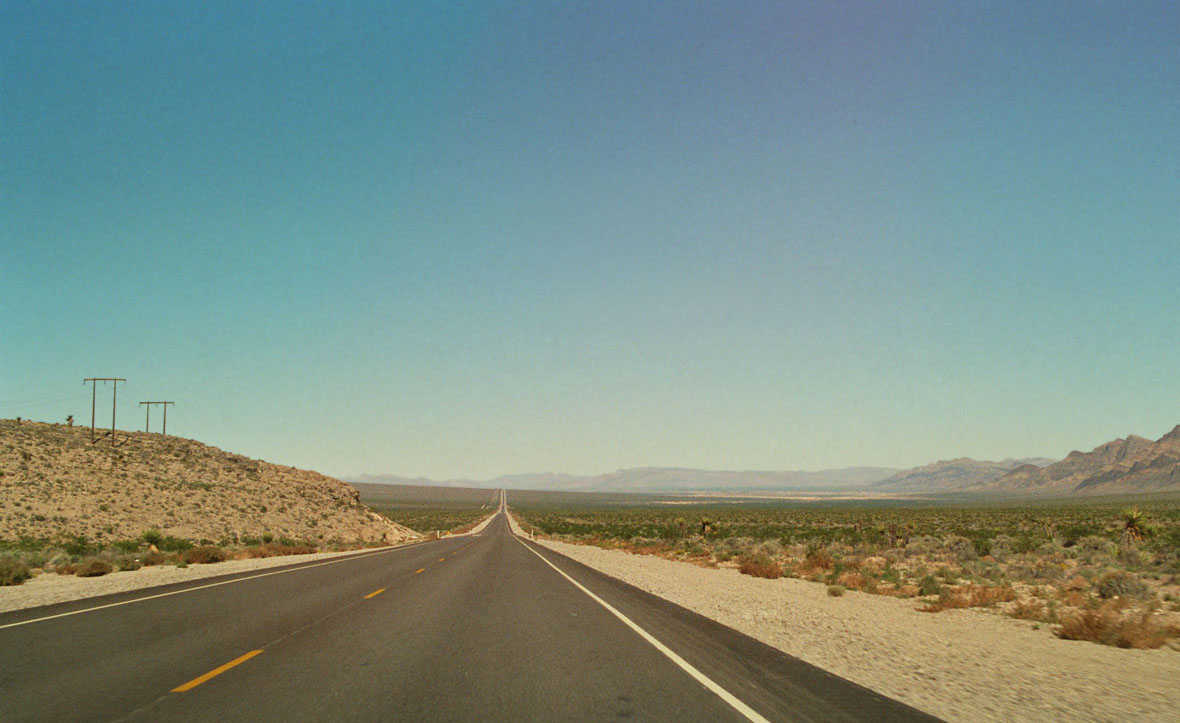
US 93 heading towards Alamo, Nevada October 1997

US 93 enters Nevada where Interstate 11 (I-11) currently begins: on the Hoover Dam Bypass. I-11 / US 93 then winds its way west-southwest through Boulder City before merging with U.S. Route 95 (US 95) past the interchange with Nevada State Route 173. These three routes (I-11 / US 93 / US 95) then curve northwest toward Las Vegas. US 93 exits at the Las Vegas Spaghetti Bowl interchange just northwest of downtown, heading northbound concurrently with Interstate 15 (I-15). Those two routes then run in a northeasterly direction through North Las Vegas until they exit the metro area, where US 93 diverges from I-15 at Apex to head north toward Great Basin National Park. Near there, the highway joins with the combined US Routes U.S. Route 6 / U.S. Route 50 (US 6 / US 50) to run northwest toward Ely. In Ely, US 6 first departs and heads west toward Tonopah. Then, shortly thereafter, US 50 departs US 93 to continue west toward Fallon and Reno (via U.S. Route 50 Alternate west, U.S. Route 95 Alternate north and Interstate 80 [I-80] west) and Carson City. Upon reaching Lages Station, U.S. Route 93 Alternate (US 93 Alt) splits off in a northeasterly direction toward West Wendover. The main route of US 93 continues north from Lages Station, intersecting I-80 at Wells before crossing the Idaho state line on the north edge of Jackpot.

Between State Route 318 and Majors Junction (US 6 / US 50), US 93 is designated a Nevada Scenic Byway. From Ely to Schellbourne Ranch, US 93 is part of the Lincoln Highway, the first road across the United States.

=== Idaho ===
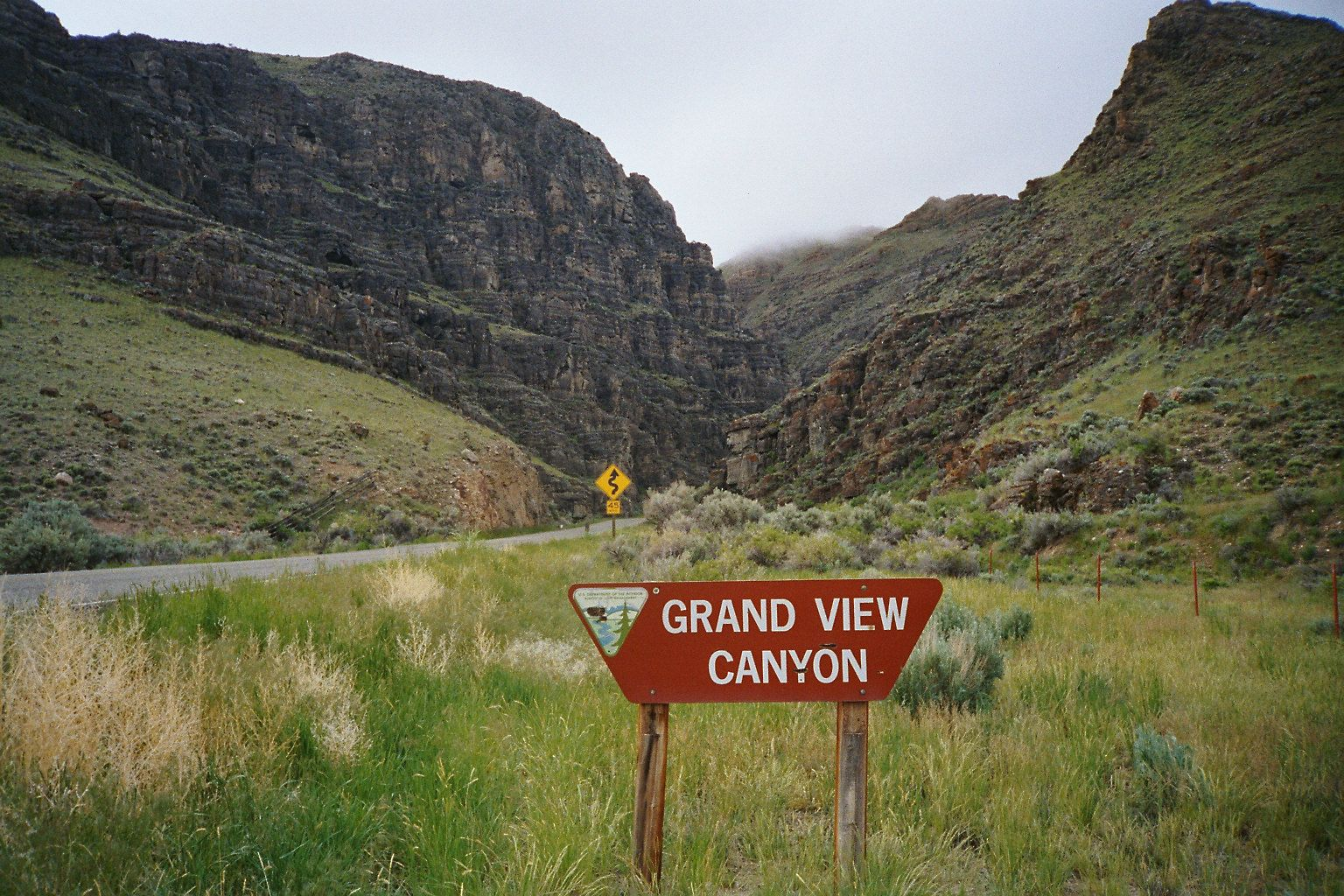
US 93 entering Grand View Canyon (between Mackay and Challis, Idaho, June 2005)

Shortly after entering Idaho, US 93 crosses U.S. Route 30 as it before running through the northern edge Twin Falls. North of here, the highway crosses the Snake River Canyon via the Perrine Bridge en route to an interchange with Interstate 84. US 93 passes through Shoshone and runs concurrently with U.S. Route 20 / U.S. Route 26 (US 20 / US 26) before reaching Arco. The highway then turns northwest (leaving US 20 / US 26) to enter the Big Lost River valley through Mackay.

Just south of Challis, US 93 becomes the northern leg of the Salmon River Scenic Byway as it heads toward the town of Salmon. From there, the highway follows portions of the Lewis and Clark Trail and passes through the Salmon-Challis National Forest before entering Montana.

=== Montana ===
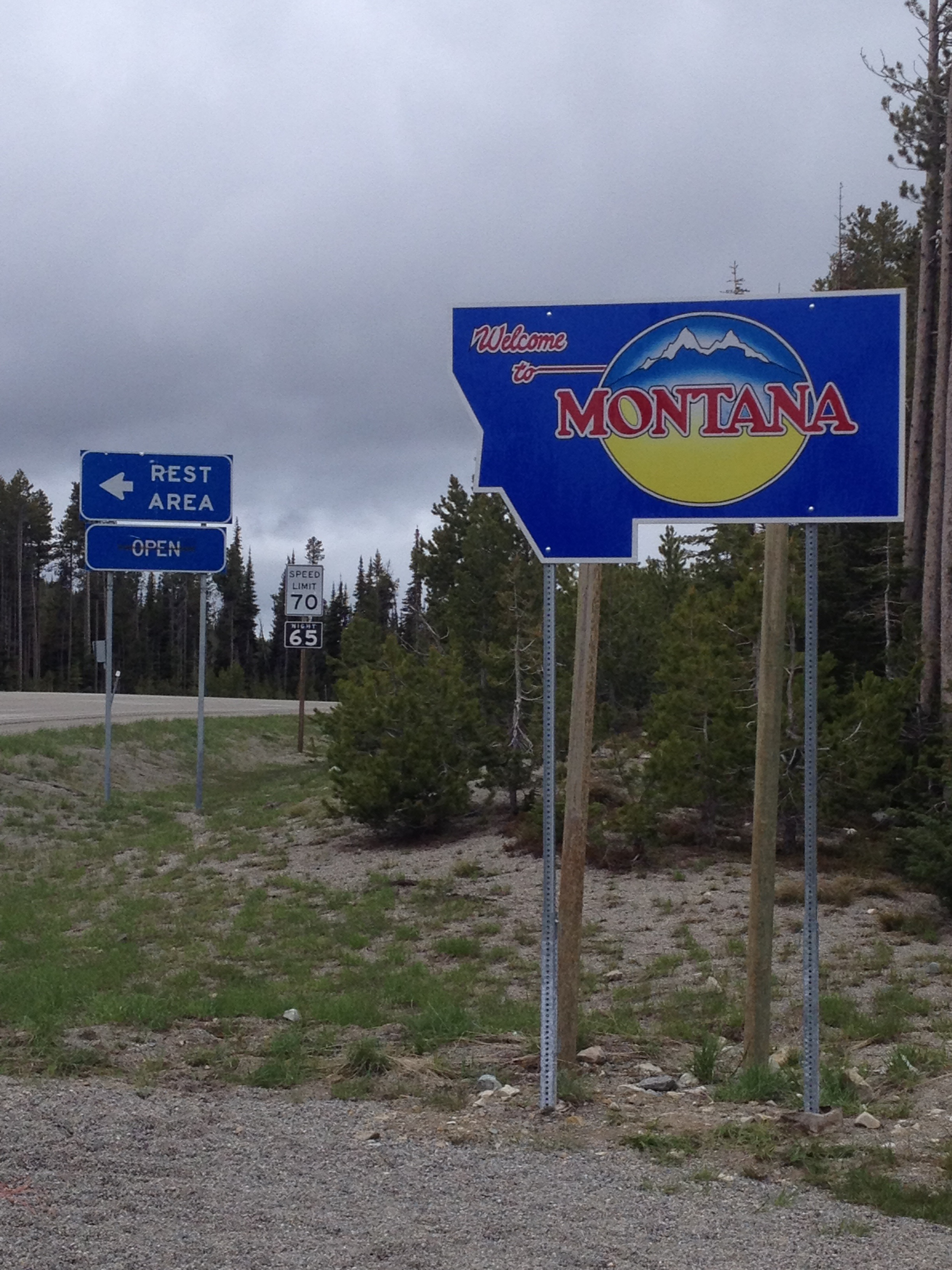
Montana State Line, US 93 at Lost Trail Pass, June 2013

US 93 enters Montana from Idaho at Lost Trail Pass and travels north descending through the Bitterroot National Forest. The highway continues along the Lewis and Clark Trail into the Bitterroot Valley towards Missoula, passing through Darby and Hamilton. At Lolo, U.S. Route 12 (US 12) joins from the west and they run concurrently northeast for 7.524 miles (12.109 km), where US 93 heads due north on Reserve Street in Missoula. US 93 then joins Interstate 90 (I-90) and runs concurrently westward for 5.384 miles (8.665 km) to Wye, where it heads north.

From Wye, US 93 continues north through the Flathead Indian Reservation, where its signage includes the historic Salish and Kutenai names for towns, rivers and streams. Portions of this section run along the CSKT Bison Range. North of the reservation, US 93 traverses the western shore of Flathead Lake, the largest freshwater lake west of the Mississippi River. North of the lake the highway runs through the cities of Kalispell and Whitefish, traveling through the Flathead National Forest and the Stillwater State Forest before reaching its terminus at the Canada–US border in Roosville. On entering Canada, the roadway becomes British Columbia Highway 93.

The portion north of Hamilton travels through one of the most densely populated areas in Montana. This section also serves as a popular north–south connection between Yellowstone National Park and Glacier National Park. As a result, the road tends to become more congested between Hamilton and Whitefish. A popular bumper sticker in Montana reads, "Pray for me, I drive Hwy 93!"

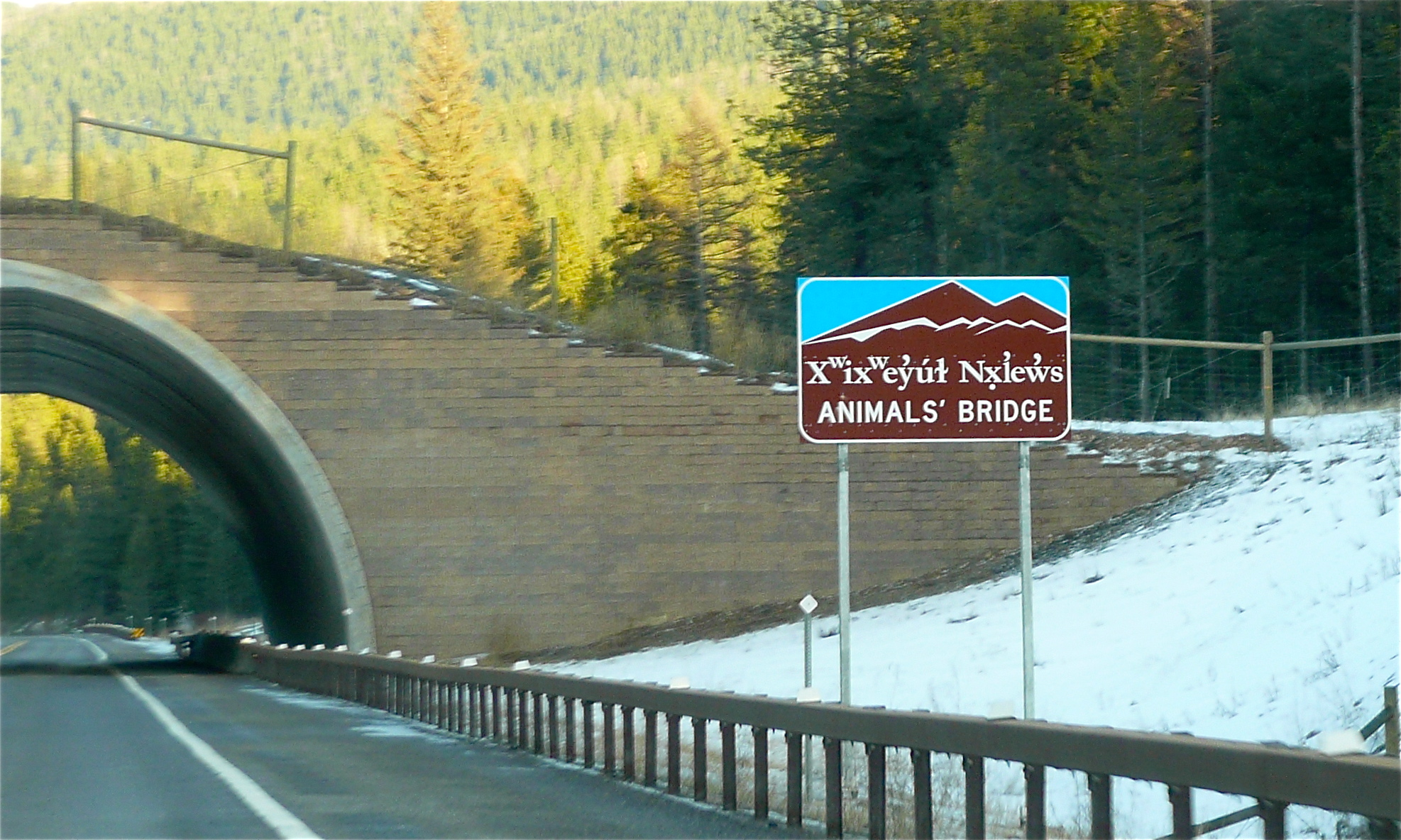
The "Animals' Bridge" on the Flathead Indian Reservation is used by grizzly and black bears, January 2012

Total US 93 mileage in Montana as of 2013 is 287.919 miles (463.361 km): 90.763 miles (146.069 km) from the Idaho state line to Reserve Street in Missoula via corridor N-7 (C000007) (includes 7.524 miles (12.109 km) concurrency with US 12), 5.369 miles (8.641 km) via corridor N-92 (C000092) (Reserve Street), 5.384 miles (8.665 km) concurrent with I-90 and MT 200 (C000090) and 186.403 miles (299.987 km) from Wye to the Canadian border via corridor N-5 (C000005) (includes 27.215 miles (43.798 km) concurrency with Montana Highway 200).

== History ==
US 93 was not one of the original U.S. highways proposed in the 1925 Bureau of Public Roads plan. However, the revised numbering plan approved by the American Association of State Highway Officials (AASHO) on November 11, 1926, established US 93 from the Canada–US border in Roosville, Montana, south through Montana and Idaho to a southern terminus at Wells, Nevada.

US 93's original northern terminus was a few miles west of its current terminus along the Kootenai River at the Gateway Port of Entry. This was the case until around 1934, when US 93 was routed along its current route.

AASHO, at its June 8, 1931, meeting, approved a southerly extension of US 93 south to Glendale, Nevada. By 1932, the Nevada Department of Highways had marked the continuation of the highway using the routing of several preexisting state highways.

At the request of the Arizona State Highway Department, the AASHO route numbering committee approved another extension of US 93 in 1935. This shifted the southern terminus south to Kingman, Arizona, by way of Las Vegas. Nevada officials again extended the route along preexisting highways; however, they may not have signed the extension right away as it was not shown on Nevada's state-published maps until 1939.

Until 1993, US 93 ended a short distance north of Wickenburg, Arizona, at a junction with U.S. Route 89. When US 89 was decommissioned in the area, the US 93 designation was carried on into Wickenburg.

A highway segment opened on October 19, 2010, in the area of Hoover Dam; the Hoover Dam Bypass replaces a segment of US 93 over the dam that had been closed to truck traffic due to security concerns since the September 11 attacks in 2001. The bypass crosses the Colorado River on a bridge downstream of the dam. The bypass eliminated the permanent truck detour through either Bullhead City, Arizona and Laughlin, Nevada or Needles, California that had been in place since 2001.

== Future ==
=== Arizona ===
Future Interstate 11
- Location: Nogales – Nevada state line
- Length: 469 mi (755 km)

US 93 (with US 60 to the southeast of Wickenburg) is currently the shortest and most direct route between Las Vegas and Phoenix, two of the fastest-growing cities in the United States. Upgrades of US 60 and US 93 to expressway status are scheduled between Las Vegas and Phoenix. Most recently, in the 2012 Fixing America's Surface Transportation Act, the United States Congress officially designated a new Interstate freeway corridor between the two cities as Interstate 11 which would mostly or completely replace US 93 in Arizona.

=== Montana ===
A new U.S. Route 93 Alternate was built to bypass through traffic around downtown Kalispell, Montana from 2010 to 2016. Currently, US 93 through Kalispell is Main Street and Sunset Boulevard, a 25 to 45 mph (40 to 72 km/h) arterial. Three segments of the bypass comprising a total of 4.5 miles (7.2 km) were completed and opened to traffic from 2010 to 2013. The remaining 3 miles (4.8 km) opened October 28, 2016. The southwest 3.2-mile (5.1 km) segment of the bypass is currently only two lanes and is slated for expansion to four lanes with two additional grade-separated interchanges when funding permits.

== Major intersections ==
Arizona
US 60 in Wickenburg
I-40 east-northeast of Kingman. The highways travel concurrently to Kingman.
Nevada
US 95 from Boulder City to Las Vegas. The highways travel concurrently to Las Vegas.
I-215 in Henderson
I-15 from Las Vegas to North Las Vegas. The highways travels concurrently to northeast of North Las Vegas.
US 6 / US 50 in Majors Place. The highways travel concurrently to Ely.
I-80 / US 93 Alt. in Wells
Idaho
US 30 east of Filer. The highways travel concurrently to Twin Falls.
I-84 north of Twin Falls
US 26 in Shoshone. The highways travel concurrently to Arco.
US 20 in Carey. The highways travel concurrently to Arco.
Montana
US 12 in Lolo. The highways travel concurrently to Missoula.
I-90 in Missoula. The highways travel concurrently to Wye.
US 2 in Kalispell
Highway 93 at the Canada–United States border in Roosville

== Cultural references ==
US 93 (Highway 93) features in the title track from Montana Cafe, a studio album by American country music artist Hank Williams Jr., released by Warner Bros. Records in July 1986.

US 93 is referenced in the song "Killer Road" by Iowa blues band The Unidynes from their 1996 album Once in a Blue Room.

Metal band Avenged Sevenfold included the stretch of US 93 between Kingman and Wickenburg in Arizona, in the music video for their song, "Dear God". Many clips of the highway and landmarks along the stretch of highway are portrayed from the band's tour bus in the video.

== See also ==
- Special routes of U.S. Route 93
- List of United States Numbered Highways

Browse numbered routes
← US 91	MT	→ I-94
