= U.S. Route 10N =

U.S. Route 10N may refer to:

- U.S. Route 10N (Minnesota), a former U.S. Highway in Minnesota
- U.S. Route 10N (Montana), a former U.S. Highway in Montana
