= U.S. Route 10S =

U.S. Route 10S may refer to:

- U.S. Route 10S (Minnesota), a former U.S. Highway in Minnesota
- U.S. Route 10S (Montana), a former U.S. Highway in Montana
