= U.S. Route 10 Alternate =

U.S. Route 10 Alternate may refer to:

- U.S. Route 10 Alternate (Seattle, Washington), a former designation for a part of state highway Washington State Route 900
- U.S. Route 10 Alternate (Washington–Montana), a former U.S. Route that ran from Seattle to Montana
- U.S. Route 10 Alternate (Drummond–Anaconda, Montana), a former designation of state highway Montana Highway 1
