= Richey, Montana =

- Town
- Seal

- Location of Richey, Montana
- Coordinates: 47°38′42″N 105°4′10″W
- Country: United States
- State: Montana
- County: Dawson

Area
  - Total: 0.26 sq mi (0.67 km^{2})
  - Land: 0.26 sq mi (0.67 km^{2})
  - Water: 0 sq mi (0.00 km^{2})
- Elevation: 2,503 ft (763 m)

Population (2020)
  - Total: 164
  - Density: 636.6/sq mi (245.78/km^{2})
- Time zone: UTC-7 (Mountain (MST))
  - Summer (DST): UTC-6 (MDT)
- ZIP code: 59259
- Area code: 406
- FIPS code: 30-62275
- GNIS feature ID: 0775750
- Website: richeymt.org

Richey is a town in Dawson County, Montana, United States. It is located to the north of Glendive, the county seat. The population was 164 at the 2020 census. The town has a strong agriculture economy with wheat, oats and barley as the main crops as well as significant cattle and sheep ranches.

Clyde Richey opened a post office in 1911.

== Geography ==
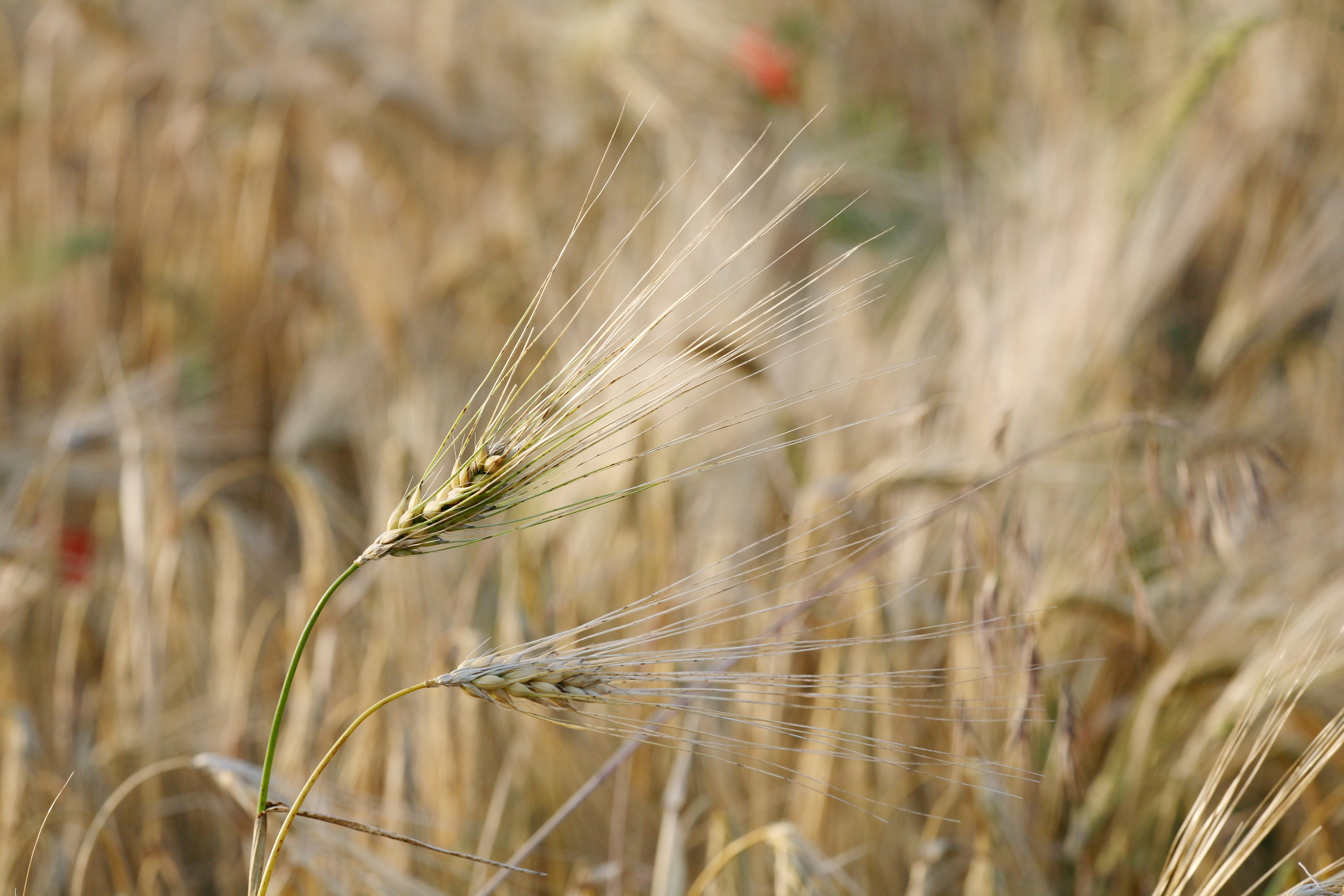
Barley

Richey is located at 47°38′42″N 105°4′10″W (47.644958, -105.069380). Montana Highway 200 passes through town. Longs Reservoir and Wold Reservoir are nearby.

According to the United States Census Bureau, the town has a total area of 0.25 square miles (0.65 km^{2}), all land.

=== Climate ===
According to the Köppen Climate Classification system, Richey has a semi-arid climate, abbreviated "BSk" on climate maps.

== Demographics ==
Historical population
Census	Pop.	Note	%±
1930	362		—
1950	595		—
1960	480		−19.3%
1970	389		−19.0%
1980	417		7.2%
1990	259		−37.9%
2000	189		−27.0%
2010	177		−6.3%
2020	164		−7.3%
U.S. Decennial Census (Note: The population of Richey was not recorded separately from Dawson County in the 1940 census.)

=== 2010 census ===
As of the census of 2010, there were 177 people, 91 households, and 51 families residing in the town. The population density was 708.0 inhabitants per square mile (273.4/km^{2}). There were 139 housing units at an average density of 556.0 per square mile (214.7/km^{2}). The racial makeup of the town was 100.000% White. Hispanic or Latino of any race were 1.1% of the population.

There were 91 households, of which 20.9% had children under the age of 18 living with them, 47.3% were married couples living together, 4.4% had a female householder with no husband present, 4.4% had a male householder with no wife present, and 44.0% were non-families. 40.7% of all households were made up of individuals, and 18.7% had someone living alone who was 65 years of age or older. The average household size was 1.95 and the average family size was 2.61.

The median age in the town was 49.5 years. 20.3% of residents were under the age of 18; 0.6% were between the ages of 18 and 24; 20.9% were from 25 to 44; 32.1% were from 45 to 64; and 26% were 65 years of age or older. The gender makeup of the town was 48.6% male and 51.4% female.

=== 2000 census ===
As of the census of 2000, there were 189 people, 92 households, and 59 families residing in the town. The population density was 697.5 inhabitants per square mile (269.3/km^{2}). There were 147 housing units at an average density of 542.5 per square mile (209.5/km^{2}). The racial makeup of the town was 98.94% White, and 1.06% from two or more races. Hispanic or Latino of any race were 1.06% of the population.

There were 92 households, out of which 25.0% had children under the age of 18 living with them, 56.5% were married couples living together, 4.3% had a female householder with no husband present, and 34.8% were non-families. 34.8% of all households were made up of individuals, and 16.3% had someone living alone who was 65 years of age or older. The average household size was 2.05 and the average family size was 2.60.

In the town, the population was spread out, with 18.5% under the age of 18, 4.8% from 18 to 24, 23.3% from 25 to 44, 31.7% from 45 to 64, and 21.7% who were 65 years of age or older. The median age was 47 years. For every 100 females there were 92.9 males. For every 100 females age 18 and over, there were 97.4 males.

The median income for a household in the town was $23,750, and the median income for a family was $33,000. Males had a median income of $21,500 versus $13,438 for females. The per capita income for the town was $14,684. About 10.0% of families and 10.0% of the population were below the poverty line, including none of those under the age of eighteen and 8.1% of those 65 or over.

== Government ==
Richey has a mayor and town council. There are four members in the town council covering two wards. Jana Olson ran unopposed for mayor in 2025.

== Education ==
Richey School District educates students from kindergarten through 12th grade.

Richey High School was home to the "Royals" sports teams for many decades. The Royals won Montana State Class C Championships in Football in 1979, Girls Basketball in 1999 and 2000, and Volleyball in 2000. With declining enrollment, the Royals merged with the Lions from Lambert to form the "R&L Fusion" sports co-op in 2009. The R&L Fusion Boys Cross Country team won the Montana State Class C Championship in 2015. The R&L Fusion Girls Track and Field team also won Montana Class C Championships back to back in 2025 and 2026.

== Attractions ==
The Richey Historical Museum includes many articles from pioneer times. There is also an annual rodeo each summer.
