= List of longest state highways in the United States =

In the United States, each state maintains its own system of state highways. (Note: Some states internally number the Interstate Highways and U.S. Highways within their state as state highways; these are not counted in the list.) This is a list of the longest state highways in each state. As of 2007, the longest state highway in the nation is Montana Highway 200, which is 706.624 miles (1,137.201 km) long. The shortest of the longest state highways is District of Columbia Route 295, which is 4.29 miles (6.90 km) long.

== List of highways ==
Longest state highways by state
State	Highway	mi	km	References
Alabama	State Route 17	346.562	557.737	
Alaska	Route 1	545.92	878.57	
Arizona	State Route 87	272.66	438.80	
Arkansas	Highway 7	296.01	476.38	
California	State Route 1	655.84	1,055.47	
Colorado	State Highway 14	236.92	381.29	
Connecticut	Route 15	83.53	134.43	
Delaware	Route 1	103.02	165.79	
District of Columbia	Route 295	4.29	6.90	(Note: DC-295 is the only non-national route in the district.)
Florida	State Road A1A	338.752	545.168	(Note: The multiple segments of FL A1A consist Florida's longest signed state highway, but FL 5 (the almost entirely unsigned designation for the US 1) is longer at 536.724 miles (863.774 km))
Georgia	State Route 11	374	602	
Hawaii	Route 11	122.3	196.8	
Idaho	State Highway 75	170.666	274.660	
Illinois	Route 1	336	541	
Indiana	State Road 62	227.8	366.6	
Iowa	Highway 3	326.163	524.908	
Kansas	K-4	367	591	
Kentucky	Route 80	464.936	748.242	
Louisiana	LA 1	431.587	694.572	
Maine	State Route 11	401.2	645.7	
Maryland	Route 2	79.24	127.52	
Massachusetts	Route 28	151.93	244.51	
Michigan	M-28	290.373	467.310	
Minnesota	State Highway 1	345.954	556.759	
Mississippi	Highway 15	344.305	554.105	
Missouri	Route 5	355	571	
Montana	Highway 200	706.624	1,137.201	
Nebraska	Highway 92	489.08	787.10	
Nevada	State Route 318	110.775	178.275	
New Hampshire	Route 16	149.75	241.00	
New Jersey	Route 47	75.19	121.01	(Note: Route 47 is New Jersey's longest signed state highway, but Route 444 (the unsigned designation for the Garden State Parkway) is longer at 172.4 miles (277.5 km))
New Mexico	State Road 120	119.9	193.0	
New York	State Route 17	396.84	638.65	
North Carolina	Highway 24	284	457	
North Dakota	Highway 200	420	680	
Ohio	State Route 7	335.98	540.71	
Oklahoma	State Highway 3	615.0	989.7	(Note: OK-3's length was computed using OK-3E, the older (and longer) of its two forks.)
Oregon	Route 140	237.01	381.43	
Pennsylvania	Route 18	205	330	
Rhode Island	Route 138	48.3	77.7	
South Carolina	Highway 9	257	414	
South Dakota	Highway 34	419.01	674.33	
Tennessee	State Route 1	538.8	867.1	
Texas	State Highway 16	541.8	871.9	
Utah	State Route 24	160.243	257.886	
Vermont	Route 100	216.55	348.50	
Virginia	State Route 40	227.68	366.42	
Washington	State Route 20	436.13	701.88	
West Virginia	Route 20	262.1	421.8	
Wisconsin	Highway 35	412.15	663.29	
Wyoming	Highway 789	407.10	655.16	
