= U.S. Route 93 in Montana =

Highway in Montana

U.S. Highway 93
- US 93 highlighted in red

Route information
- Maintained by MDT
- Length: 287.919 mi (463.361 km)

Major junctions
- South end: US 93 at the Idaho state line at Lost Trail Pass
- US 12 from Lolo to Missoula; I-90 from Missoula to Wye; MT 200 from Missoula to Ravalli; US 93 Alt. near Kalispell; US 2 in Kalispell
- North end: Highway 93 at the Canadian border near Eureka

Location
- Country: United States
- State: Montana
- Counties: Ravalli, Missoula, Lake, Flathead, Lincoln

Highway system
- United States Numbered Highway System; List; Special; Divided; Montana Highway System; Interstate; US; State; Secondary
← US 91	→ US 93 Alt.

U.S. Highway 93 (US 93) is a north–south United States Numbered Highway in the state of Montana.

== Route description ==
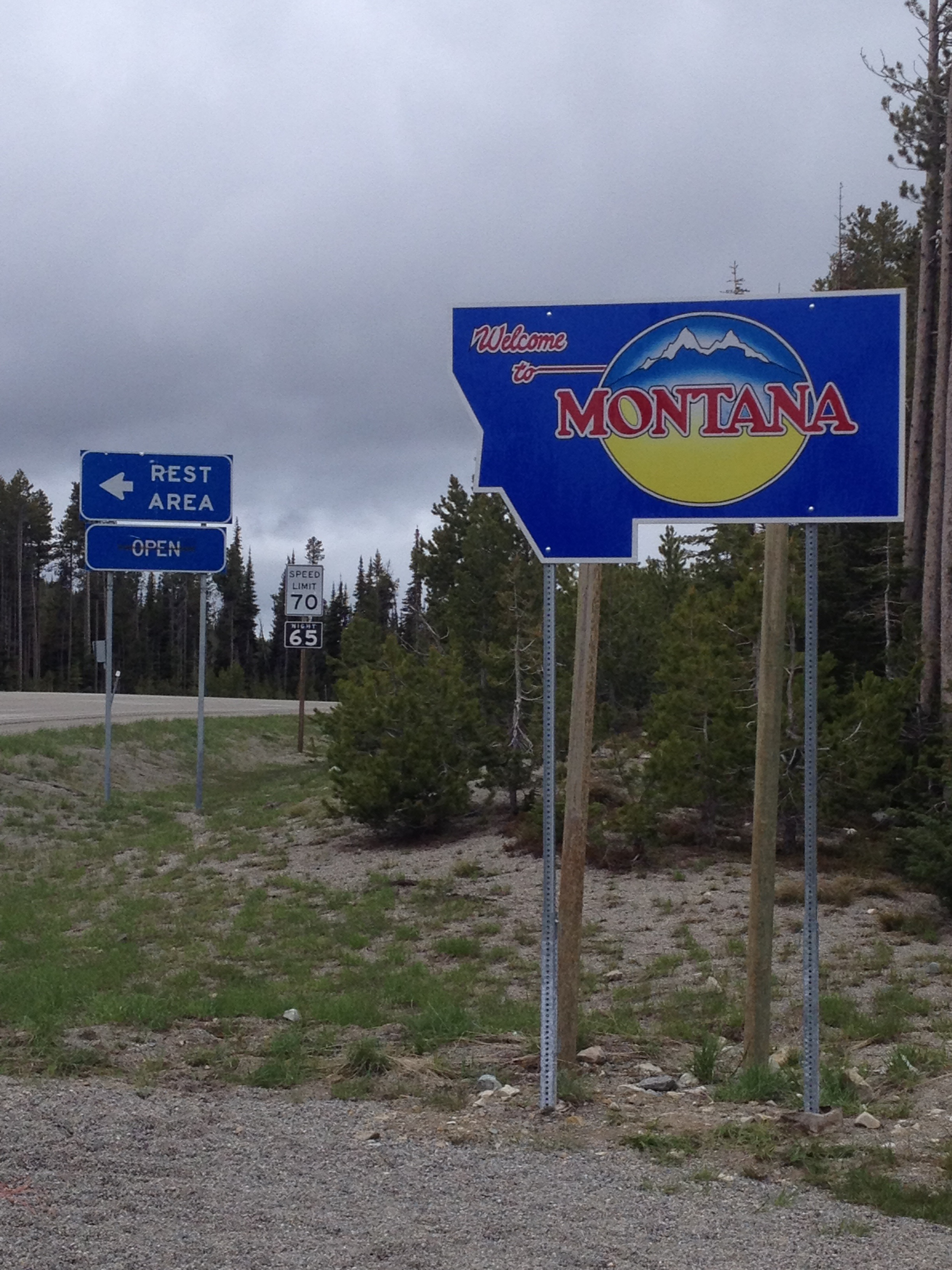
Montana State Line, US 93 at Lost Trail Pass

US 93 enters Montana from Idaho at Lost Trail Pass and travels north descending through the Bitterroot National Forest. The highway continues along the Lewis and Clark Trail into the Bitterroot Valley toward Missoula, passing through Darby and Hamilton. At Lolo, US 12 joins from the west and they run concurrently northeasterly for 7.5 miles (12.1 km), where US 93 heads due north on Reserve Street in Missoula. US 93 then joins I-90 and runs concurrently westward for 5.4 miles (8.7 km) to Wye, where it heads north.

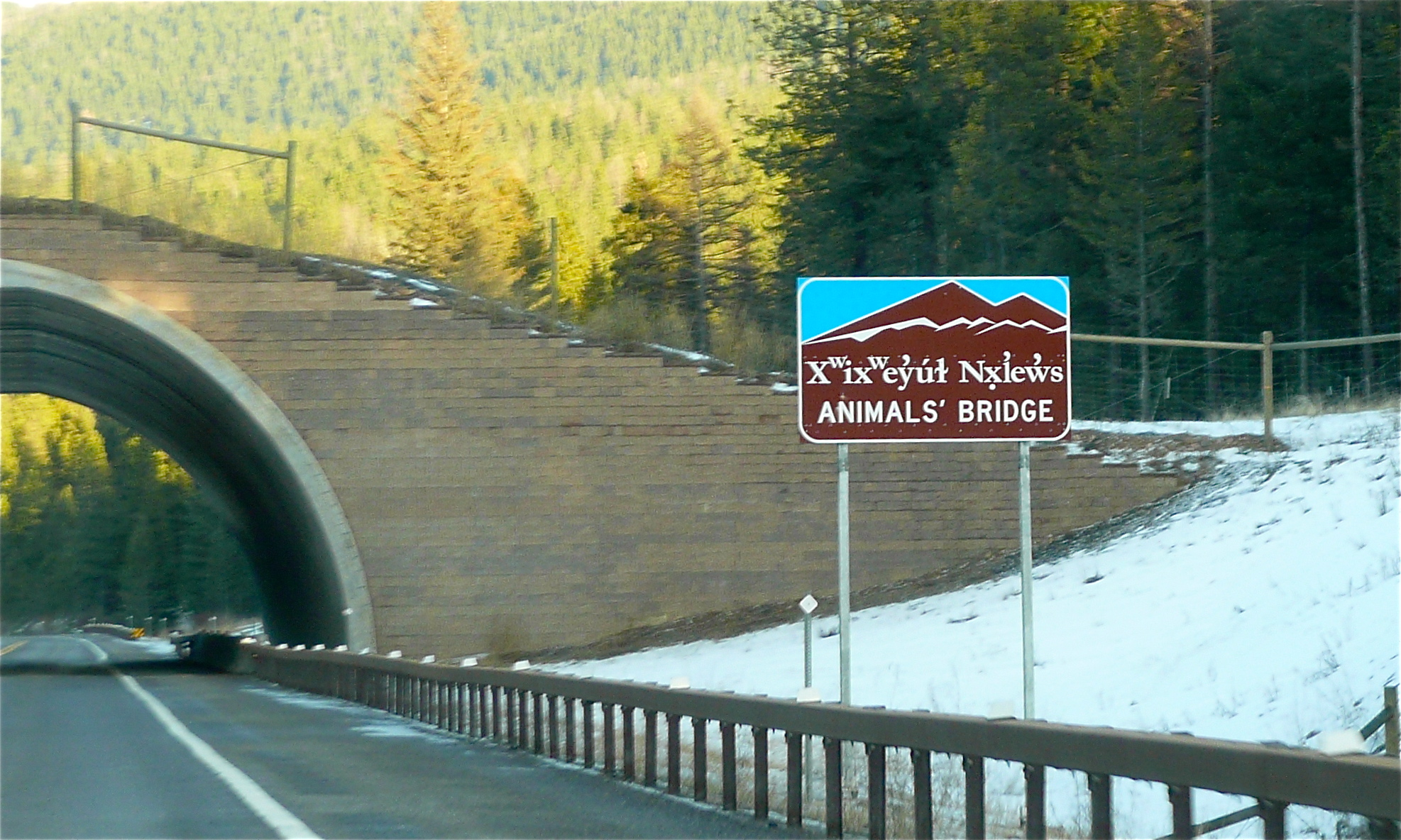
The "Animals' Bridge" on the Flathead Indian Reservation is used by grizzly and black bears.

From Wye, US 93 continues north through the Flathead Indian Reservation, where its signage includes the historic Salish and Kutenai names for towns, rivers, and streams. Portions of this section run along the CSKT Bison Range. North of the reservation, US 93 traverses the western shore of Flathead Lake, the largest freshwater lake west of the Mississippi River. North of the lake the highway runs through the cities of Kalispell and Whitefish, traveling through the Flathead National Forest and the Stillwater State Forest before reaching its terminus at the Canadian border near Eureka.

The portion north of Hamilton travels through one of the most densely populated areas in Montana. This section also serves as a popular north–south connection between Yellowstone National Park and Glacier National Park. As a result, the road tends to become more congested between Hamilton and Whitefish. A popular bumper sticker in Montana reads, "Pray for me, I drive Hwy 93!"

== History ==
The Lewis and Clark Expedition became the first white men to travel the future US 93 corridor between today's Lost Trail Pass and Lolo in 1805, and Lewis's detachment ventured further north to the future site of Missoula in 1806 on their way to explore the Marias River. When US 93 was established in 1926, the nature of the highway's construction in Montana's mixture of terrain around glacial lakes, through dense forests and over high mountains was a significant challenge given the construction techniques and equipment of the time. On completed sections, animal-vehicle accidents would prove to be a thorn in the side of traveler and engineer alike.

Many stretches have been widened and straightened, or else rerouted in ongoing efforts to improve traffic safety and preserve animals at the same time. Some of the old sections are still in use today, including the original gravel routing from Lost Trail Pass to Sula vía Gibbons Pass and Bitterroot-Bighorn Roads, and old paved sections from Darby to Hamilton, through Missoula via Brooks, Stephens, Orange and West Broadway Streets, through St. Ignatius, north of Ronan to north of Pablo, northeast of Elmo through Dayton, Political Hill Road south of Lakeside, Lakeside Boulevard north of Lakeside, Old US 93 S in Somers, Forest Hill Road north of Somers, and two sections between Whitefish and Eureka.

US 93 is now four-lanes from Hamilton to Evaro, through Arlee, north of Ronan to the south edge of Polson, and north of Somers to the south edge of Whitefish (except a six-block section near the county courthouse in Kalispell).

Significant animal conservation efforts have also been accomplished in several areas of the corridor from Hamilton to Missoula, and from Missoula to Polson. In 1997, the Confederated Salish and Kootenai Tribes of the Flathead Nation entered negotiations with the Montana Department of Transportation over improvements to the 56-mile section (90 km) through the reservation as the tribes were concerned that project would destroy wetlands, further fragment wildlife habitat, and kill more animals crossing the highway. With concern for the nearby designated wilderness and grizzly bear habitat in the Mission Mountains, an agreement with the state and the Federal Highway Administration was reached in December 2000. While the passing lanes, turning lanes, climbing lanes, and wider shoulders were intended to cut down on accidents, the project also included 41 fish and wildlife crossings with the most visible being “Animals’ Trail”, a 197-foot wide vegetated bridge (60 m).

== Kalispell Bypass ==
A new US 93 Alternate (US 93 Alt.) was built to bypass through traffic around downtown Kalispell, Montana, between 2010-2016. Currently, US 93 through Kalispell is Main Street and Sunset Boulevard, a 25 to 45 mph (40 to 70 km/h) arterial. Three segments of the bypass comprising a total of 4.5 miles (7.2 km) were completed and opened to traffic between 2010 and 2013. The remaining three miles (4.8 km) opened on October 28, 2016. The southwest 3.2-mile (5.1 km) segment of the bypass is currently only two lanes and is slated for expansion to four lanes with two additional grade-separated interchanges when funding permits.

== Major intersections ==
County	Location	mi	km	Exit	Destinations	Notes
Ravalli	Lost Trail Pass	0.000	0.000		US 93 south – Salmon	Continuation into Idaho
Ravalli	Lost Trail Pass	0.009	0.014		MT 43 east – Wisdom	Access to Chief Joseph Pass and Gibbons Pass
Ravalli	Conner	26.265	42.269		S-473 south (West Fork Road)	Access to Painted Rocks State Park, Horse Creek Pass and Nez Perce Pass
Ravalli	Grantsdale	42.967	69.149		S-531 north (Roaring Lion Road)	
Ravalli	Grantsdale	44.292	71.281		MT 38 east (Skalkaho Highway) – Phillipsburg	
Ravalli	Hamilton	47.092	75.787		S-269 north (Marcus Street) / S-531 south (Main Street)	
Ravalli	Woodside	51.709	83.218		S-373 east (Woodside Cutoff) – Corvallis	
Ravalli		60.849	97.927		S-370 east (Bell Crossing)	
Ravalli	Stevensville	66.486	106.999		S-269 south (Stevensville Road)	
Ravalli	Florence	74.436	119.793		S-203 east (Eastside Road)	
Missoula	Lolo	83.239	133.960		US 12 west / Lewis and Clark Trail – Lewiston ID	Southern end of US 12 concurrency
Missoula	Missoula	90.763	146.069		US 12 east / US 93 Bus. north / Lewis and Clark Trail (Brooks Street)	Northern end of US 12 concurrency
Missoula	Missoula	95.119	153.079		I-90 BL east / US 93 Bus. south (W. Broadway)	Interchange; former US 93 south / US 10 / MT 200; southern end of I-90 BL concurrency
Missoula	Missoula	96.132	154.709	101	I-90 east / MT 200 east / I-90 BL ends – Butte	Western terminus of I-90 BL; southern end of I-90 / MT 200 concurrency; exit numbers follow I-90
Missoula		97.908	157.568	99	Airway Boulevard	
Missoula	Wye	101.516	163.374	96	I-90 west – Coeur d'Alene	Northern end of I-90 concurrency
Lake		117.844	189.652		S-559 east (Jocko Road)	Connects to Seeley Lake via Jocko Canyon, Placid Creek, and Placid Lake Roads
Lake	Ravalli	128.731	207.172		MT 200 west – National Bison Range, Thompson Falls	Northern end of MT 200 concurrency
Lake		143.254	230.545		S-212 south – Charlo, Moiese, Dixon	National Bison Range visitor center and HQ in Moiese
Lake	Ronan	148.277	238.629		S-211 west (Round Butte Road)	Connects to Hot Springs via Sloan Road and Little Bitterroot Road
Lake	Polson	160.033	257.548		MT 35 north – Bigfork	Flathead Lake east lakeshore route
Lake	Polson	161.966	260.659		S-354 south (Main Street)	Access to SKQ Dam
Lake	Elmo	178.484	287.242		MT 28 west – Hot Springs, Plains	
Lake	Dayton	183.787	295.777		S-352 west – Proctor, Lake Mary Ronan	
Flathead	Somers	205.222	330.273		MT 82 east – Bigfork	
Flathead		210.057	338.054		US 93 Alt. north (Kalispell Bypass)	Southern terminus of US 93 Alt.
Flathead	Kalispell	210.706	339.098		S-317 north (Willow Glen Drive)	De facto southeast bypass
Flathead	Kalispell	212.471	341.939		S-503 south (Airport Road)	Serves Kalispell City Airport
Flathead	Kalispell	213.632	343.807		US 2 (Idaho Road) – Libby, Glacier Park	
Flathead	Kalispell	216.545	348.495		US 93 Alt. south (Kalispell Bypass) / West Reserve Drive	Northern terminus of US 93 Alt.
Flathead		226.125	363.913		MT 40 east – Columbia Falls, Glacier Nat'l Park	
Flathead	Whitefish	228.493	367.724		S-487 north (Baker Street)	Access to Whitefish Mountain Resort ski area and Whitefish Lake
Flathead		233.093	375.127		S-424 south (Twin Bridges Road)	
Lincoln	Eureka	281.366	452.815		MT 37 south – Libby, Rexford	Access to Lake Koocanusa
Lincoln	Roosville	287.919	463.361		Roosville Border Crossing at the Canada–United States border	
Lincoln	Roosville	287.919	463.361		Highway 93 north – Cranbrook	Continuation into British Columbia
1.000 mi = 1.609 km; 1.000 km = 0.621 mi: Concurrency terminus

U.S. Route 93
Previous state: Idaho	Montana	Next state: Terminus
