= U.S. Route 93 Alternate (Kalispell, Montana) =

Alternate highway route in Montana, United States

U.S. Highway 93 Alternate
- Kalispell Bypass
- US 93 Alternate highlighted in red

Route information
- Auxiliary route of US 93
- Maintained by MDT
- Length: 7.6098 mi (12.2468 km) (segments open as of 2013; final est. 7.6 miles)
- Existed: 2010–present

Major junctions
- South end: US 93 south of Kalispell
- US 2
- North end: US 93 north of Kalispell

Location
- Country: United States
- State: Montana
- Counties: Flathead

Highway system
- United States Numbered Highway System; List; Special; Divided; Montana Highway System; Interstate; US; State; Secondary
← US 93	→ I-94

U.S. Highway 93 Alternate (US 93 Alt. or Alt 93) in the U.S. state of Montana is an alternate route of US 93 that bypasses the central business district of the city of Kalispell.

== Route description ==
US 93 Alt. begins at US 93 south of Kalispell approximately 0.7 miles (1.1 km) south of the "Four Corners" junction with Secondary Highway 317 (S-317), and currently runs as a temporary two-lane highway for nearly 4 miles (6.4 km) to US 2 west of Kalispell, and as a four-lane highway from there for nearly 3.6 miles (5.8 km) to its northern terminus at US 93 north of Kalispell.

The completed circuit opened to traffic on October 28, 2016. Future construction includes completing the permanent four-lane highway from US 2 south to US 93 with grade-separated interchanges at both S-503 intersections (Airport Road and Foys Lake Road/Meridian Road) when funding permits.

The next phase of construction is planned to begin in summer 2019, following receipt of a $12.75 million federal BUILD grant for the segment from the Ashley Creek bridge to just north of Airport Road, for expanding the highway to four lanes and building the first of the two planned interchanges (Foys Lake/Meridian), with design work and right-of-way acquisition for the remaining segment beginning in January 2019.

== History ==
The idea for a bypass to relieve congestion in downtown Kalispell had been discussed since the 1940s, with the first formal request submitted to the then-Montana Highway Department in 1953. Most proposals centered on a western route on or near the former Great Northern (Now BNSF) railroad route between Somers and Kalispell, especially when relocation and environmental concerns eliminated expansion of S-317 southeast of Kalispell for that purpose. The idea finally came to fruition in 1994 with the approval of the region's federal environmental impact statement for upcoming highway construction projects. The statement formally established the route of the proposed Kalispell bypass slightly west of the original railroad route, with a bridge over that route to link it to US 93. Corridor design began in 1995, with Montana Department of Transportation (MDT) and Federal Highway Administration (FHWA) right-of-way corridor approval in 1997.

In 2004, MDT reevaluated the Kalispell bypass portion of the study, began the bypass design and conducted the first community meeting to give an overview of the project. Design work and right-of-way acquisition continued, and in 2008 the project design was changed to staged construction, to construct as funding allowed. The segments from US 2 south to US 93 and Reserve Loop (since renamed Old Reserve Drive) to US 93 were chosen as the first to be constructed.

The first segment from US 2 south to the Foys Lake Road/Meridian Road roundabout was completed and opened in fall 2010, and the segment from there to the Airport Road roundabout and US 93 was completed and opened in November 2012. The segment from Old Reserve Drive to US 93 was completed and opened in November 2013, and culvert and overpass work for the future S-424 interchange were completed in 2014.

2015-2016 construction of the northwest segment from US 2 north to Old Reserve (S-548) included grade-separated interchanges at US 2, Three Mile Drive (S-424), Four Mile Drive and S-548, and an overpass for Two Mile Drive. This round of construction also expanded the first 2010 segment (Foys Lake Road/Meridian Road to US 2) to four lanes.

== Major intersections ==
The entire route is in Kalispell, Flathead County.

mi	km	Exit	Destinations	Notes
0.0000	0.0000		US 93 – Kalispell, Missoula	US 93 Alt. southern terminus
1.2812	2.0619		Airport Road (S-503)	Roundabout
2.9000	4.6671	—	Sunnyside Drive	Northbound exit only
3.2481	5.2273	3	Foys Lake Road (S-503)	Dogbone Interchange; south end of expressway
4.0091	6.4520	4	US 2	
5.1096	8.2231	5	Three Mile Drive (S-424)	
6.1586	9.9113	6	Four Mile Drive	
7.0000	11.2654	7	Old Reserve Drive (S-548 west)	Southern end of S-548 concurrency; north end of expressway; approximate milepoint
7.6098	12.2468		US 93 – Whitefish, Kalispell Reserve Drive (S-548 east)	US 93 Alt. northern terminus; northern end of S-548 concurrency; continues as S-548 (Reserve Drive)
1.000 mi = 1.609 km; 1.000 km = 0.621 mi: Concurrency terminus; Incomplete access
