= Fairview, Montana =

- Town
- Location of Fairview, Montana
- Coordinates: 47°51′07″N 104°03′03″W
- Country: United States
- State: Montana
- County: Richland
- Established: 1906

Area
  - Total: 0.80 sq mi (2.07 km^{2})
  - Land: 0.80 sq mi (2.07 km^{2})
  - Water: 0 sq mi (0.00 km^{2})
- Elevation: 1,926 ft (587 m)

Population (2020)
  - Total: 896
  - Density: 1,118.4/sq mi (431.82/km^{2})
- Time zone: UTC-7 (Mountain (MST))
  - Summer (DST): UTC-6 (MDT)
- ZIP code: 59221
- Area code: 406
- FIPS code: 30-25300
- GNIS feature ID: 2412618
- Website: https://fairviewmt.com/

Fairview is a town in Richland County, Montana, United States. The population was 896 at the 2020 census. Incorporated in 1913, the town lies on the North Dakota border.

== Geography ==
According to the United States Census Bureau, the town has a total area of 0.97 square miles (2.51 km^{2}), all land.

== Demographics ==
Historical population
Census	Pop.	Note	%±
1920	513		—
1930	576		12.3%
1940	901		56.4%
1950	942		4.6%
1960	1,006		6.8%
1970	956		−5.0%
1980	1,366		42.9%
1990	869		−36.4%
2000	709		−18.4%
2010	840		18.5%
2020	896		6.7%
U.S. Decennial Census

=== 2010 census ===
As of the census of 2010, there were 840 people, 354 households, and 217 families living in the town. The population density was 866.0 inhabitants per square mile (334.4/km^{2}). There were 383 housing units at an average density of 394.8 per square mile (152.4/km^{2}). The racial makeup of the town was 95.5% White, 0.2% African American, 1.7% Native American, 1.4% from other races, and 1.2% from two or more races. Hispanic or Latino of any race were 3.3% of the population.

There were 354 households, of which 32.8% had children under the age of 18 living with them, 42.9% were married couples living together, 11.3% had a female householder with no husband present, 7.1% had a male householder with no wife present, and 38.7% were non-families. 33.3% of all households were made up of individuals, and 13.6% had someone living alone who was 65 years of age or older. The average household size was 2.37 and the average family size was 3.02.

The median age in the town was 37.8 years. 26.7% of residents were under the age of 18; 7.5% were between the ages of 18 and 24; 26.1% were from 25 to 44; 24.7% were from 45 to 64; and 15.1% were 65 years of age or older. The gender makeup of the town was 51.4% male and 48.6% female.

=== 2000 census ===
As of the census of 2000, there were 709 people, 310 households, and 184 families living in the town. The population density was 736.4 inhabitants per square mile (284.3/km^{2}). There were 390 housing units at an average density of 405.1 per square mile (156.4/km^{2}). The racial makeup of the town was 96.47% White, 0.85% Native American, 0.99% from other races, and 1.69% from two or more races. Hispanic or Latino of any race were 2.40% of the population.

There were 310 households, out of which 29.0% had children under the age of 18 living with them, 47.4% were married couples living together, 7.7% had a female householder with no husband present, and 40.6% were non-families. 38.7% of all households were made up of individuals, and 18.7% had someone living alone who was 65 years of age or older. The average household size was 2.29 and the average family size was 3.09.

In the town, the population was spread out, with 27.5% under the age of 18, 6.1% from 18 to 24, 26.7% from 25 to 44, 22.6% from 45 to 64, and 17.2% who were 65 years of age or older. The median age was 39 years. For every 100 females there were 102.0 males. For every 100 females age 18 and over, there were 94.0 males.

The median income for a household in the town was $26,023, and the median income for a family was $33,125. Males had a median income of $24,000 versus (?) females. The per capita income for the town was $13,235. About 11.1% of families and 15.7% of the population were below the poverty line, including 16.6% of those under age 18 and 13.5% of those age 65 or over.

== Government ==
Fairview has a mayor and town council. There are six members on the town council. In September 2025 Betty Cherrey was appointed mayor to finish the term of Brian Bieber who retired. She ran unopposed in November 2025.

Brian Bieber became mayor in 2018. He replaced Bryan Cummins who held the position for 32 years.

== Education ==
Fairview provides education from kindergarten through 12th grade. Fairview High School's team name is the Warriors.
