= Montana Highway 200 =

State highway in Montana, United States

Montana Highway 200
- MT 200 highlighted in red

Route information
- Maintained by MDT
- Length: 706.584 mi (1,137.137 km)
- Existed: October 1967–present
- Tourist routes: Lewis and Clark Trail

Major junctions
- West end: SH-200 at the Idaho state line in Clark Fork, ID
- US 93 from Ravalli to Missoula; I-90 from Wye to Bonner; US 12 from Missoula to Bonner; US 287 near Milford Colony; US 89 from Sun River to Armington; I-15 from Vaughn to Great Falls; US 87 from Great Falls to Grass Range; US 191 from near Hobson to Lewistown
- East end: ND 200 at the North Dakota state line at Fairview

Location
- Country: United States
- State: Montana
- Counties: Sanders, Lake, Missoula, Powell, Lewis and Clark, Cascade, Judith Basin, Fergus, Petroleum, Garfield, McCone, Dawson, Richland

Highway system
- Montana Highway System; Interstate; US; State; Secondary
← US 191	→ US 212

Montana Highway 200 (MT 200) in the U.S. state of Montana is a route running east–west, across the entire state of Montana. From the starting point at ID 200, near Heron, the highway runs east to ND 200 near Fairview. It is part of a chain of state highways numbered 200 that extend from Idaho across Montana, North Dakota, and Minnesota, totaling approximately 1,356 miles (2,182 km) long. At 706.272 mi (1,136.635 km), Montana Highway 200 is also the longest route signed as a state highway in the United States. Highway 200 helps to connect many small towns located in central Montana and the vast plains area of eastern Montana, to larger western Montana cities such as Great Falls and Missoula.

== Route description ==
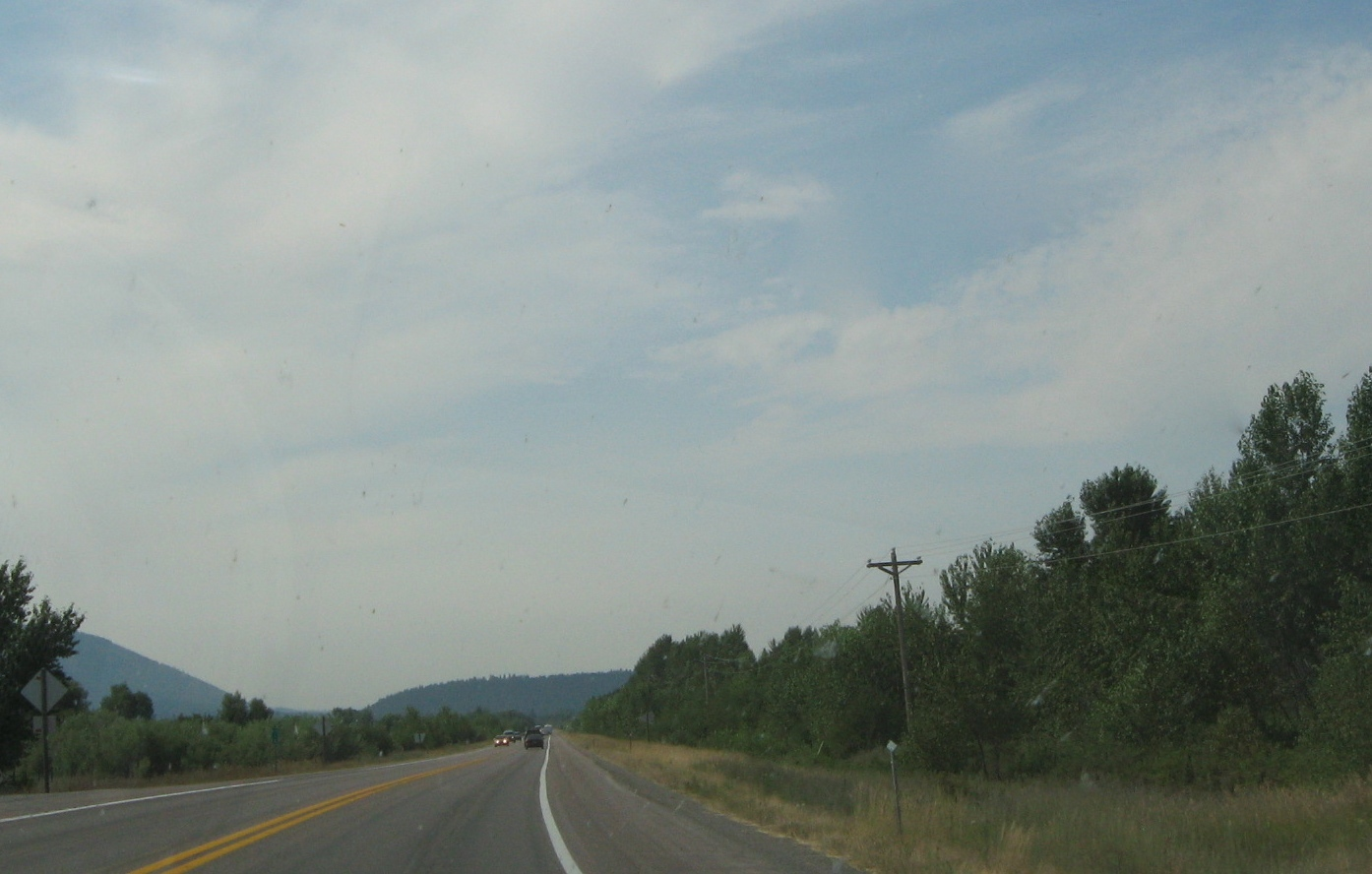
Highway 200 and US 93 southbound

At its western end at the Idaho state line, MT 200 follows the Clark Fork River at the feet of the Cabinet Mountains eastward for 85 miles (137 km) until it meets the Flathead River at MT 135. It then follows the Flathead River east for 25 miles (40 km) to Sčilíp (formerly Dixon) where the Flathead River turns north. MT 200 continues east following the Jocko River for 6 miles (10 km) and borders the CSKT Bison Range until it intersects with US 93 at Ravalli. The two highways share a 27-mile (43 km) concurrency and travel south I-90, where they head east into Missoula. MT 200 follows I-90 through Missoula for 14 miles (23 km), with US 93 departing and US 12 joining the route along the way, leaving the interstate near Milltown. The highway runs parallel to the Blackfoot River and is subject to hazardous driving conditions in the winter, particularly due to black ice. From I-90, the road travels 74 miles (119 km) east to Lincoln, and another 39 miles (63 km) where it crosses Rogers Pass on the Continental Divide. It continues east for 21 miles (34 km) to Bowman's Corner where it intersects US 287, and then another 30 miles (48 km) to Sun River where it merges with US 89. The two highways travel for 8 miles (13 km) east to I-15 near Vaughn, where they join the interstate and travel south for 12 miles (19 km) to Great Falls.

In Great Falls, MT 200 and US 89 leave I-15, where they become concurrent with MT 3, share a brief concurrency with I-315 (I-15 Business), and merge with US 87, following 10th Avenue South eastward through the city. The four routes of US 87, US 89, MT 3, and MT 200 share a 23-mile (37 km) concurrency from Great Falls to Armington Junction (near Belt), where US 89 heads south and the three remaining routes continue east for 65 miles (105 km). At Eddie's Corner (near Moore), the routes meet US 191 where MT 3 and US 191 share a common alignment to Harlowton. US 87, US 191, and MT 200 share a 14-mile (23 km) concurrency to Lewistown, where US 191 heads north, and US 87/MT 200 continue another 34 miles (55 km) to Grass Range. At Grass Range, MT 200 and US 87 end their 135-mile-long (217 km) concurrency and MT 200 continues east for 98 miles (158 km) to MT 59 in Jordan. MT 200 continues 68 miles (109 km) east to Circle where it intersects MT 13 and MT 200S (an auxiliary route that connects MT 200 with Glendive and Interstate 94). It continues 71 miles (114 km) east until it intersects MT 16 and MT 23, where MT 16 and MT 200 head north into Sidney and share a 2.5-mile-long (4.0 km) concurrency. MT 200 leaves Sydney and travels northeast for 11 miles (18 km) to Fairview, where it turns east and crosses into North Dakota.

MT 200 follows the following MDT corridors:

Corridor	Length (mi)	Length (km)	West end	East end	Notes
P-6 (C000006)	115.787	186.341	Idaho state line	Ravalli	
N-5 (C000005)	27.215	43.798	Ravalli	Wye	US 93 concurrency
I-90 (C000090)	13.881	22.339	Wye	Bonner	I-90 concurrency
N-24 (C000024)	140.184	225.604	Bonner	Sun River	
N-3 (C000003)	7.763	12.493	Sun River	Vaughn	US 89 concurrency
I-15 (C000015)	11.604	18.675	Vaughn	Great Falls	I-15 concurrency
I-315 (C000315)	0.828	1.333	Great Falls		I-315 concurrency
N-60 (C000060)	24.726	39.793	Great Falls	Armington	US 87 / US 89 / MT 3 concurrency
N-57(C000057)	279.109	449.182	Armington	Circle	Includes US 87 / US 191 / MT 3 concurrencies
P-51 (C000051)	71.047	114.339	Circle	Jct. MT 16 / MT 23 south of Sidney	
N-20 (C000020)	14.128	22.737	Jct. MT 16 / MT 23 south of Sidney	North Dakota state line	Includes MT 16 concurrency

== History ==
Today's Highway 200 is part of a four-state chain of such routes, but it did not begin that way. It was assembled from other state and federal routes over the years.

The status of the routes and route segments that became Highway 200 in 1937.

- The section from the Idaho line to Ravalli was the original MT 3.
- No concurrency from Ravalli to Missoula on US 93 or US 10.
- The section from Bonner to Sun River was then MT 20, and much was yet to be constructed. The route even followed segments of today's MT 21 to Augusta and future US 287 (then MT 33).
- No concurrency from Sun River to Grass Range along US 87.
- The section from Grass Range to Circle was part of the original MT 18.
- The remainder of MT 18 ran from Circle to Glendive, today's MT 200S.
- The section from Circle to Sidney was Montana 23, ending at then MT 14.
- MT 14 ran the rest of the way to Fairview.

By 1941, US 10 Alternate (US 10A) had replaced MT 3 as part of an alternate route from Wye to Spokane via Sandpoint and was now concurrent with US 93 to US 10.

Between 1948 and 1959, many construction projects and route redesignations with concurrencies made MT 20 from Bonner to Sidney the baseline for today's MT 200. MT 23N replaced MT 14 from Sidney to Fairview and MT 20S replaced MT 18 from Circle to Glendive.

In 1960, MT 20 picked up the Sidney to Fairview segment.

By 1969, the entire MT 20 had become MT 200 and included the former US 10A from Idaho to Wye, and following US 10/93 through Missoula. MT 20S became 200S.

== Major junctions ==
County	Location	mi	km	Exit	Destinations	Notes
Sanders		0.000	0.000		SH-200 west – Sandpoint	Continuation into Idaho
Sanders		10.418	16.766		MT 56 north to US 2 – Troy	Southern terminus of MT 56
Sanders		27.959	44.996		S-472 south (Blue Slide Road)	
Sanders		49.102	79.022		S-471 west (Prospect Creek Road)	Forest Highway 7, seasonal access to Thompson Pass (S-471) and Cooper Pass (FR-7623, Prospect Creek Road)
Sanders	Thompson Falls	49.544	79.733		S-472 north (Blue Slide Road)	
Sanders		56.013	90.144		S-556 north (Thompson River Road)	
Sanders	Plains	76.706	123.446		MT 28 east – Hot Springs, Kalispell, Glacier Park	Western terminus of MT 28
Sanders		85.030	136.843		MT 135 south to I-90 – St. Regis	Northern terminus of MT 135
Sanders	Perma	95.617	153.881		S-382 north – Hot Springs	
Sanders	Dixon	109.750	176.626		S-212 north – CSKT Bison Range, Moiese, Charlo	
Lake	Ravalli	115.787	186.341		US 93 north – Kalispell	Western end of US 93 concurrency
Lake		126.674	203.862		S-559 east (Jocko Road)	
Missoula	Wye	142.057	228.619		S-574 west (Frenchtown Frontage Road)	
Missoula	Wye	143.002	230.139	96	I-90 west – Coeur d'Alene	Western end of I-90 concurrency; exit numbers follow I-90
Missoula		146.610	235.946	99	Airway Boulevard	
Missoula	Missoula	148.386	238.804	101	I-90 BL east / US 93 south (Reserve Street) – Hamilton	Eastern end of US 93 concurrency
Missoula	Missoula	151.449	243.734	104	Orange Street	
Missoula	Missoula	152.313	245.124	105	I-90 BL west / US 12 west (Van Buren Street) / Lewis and Clark Trail	Western end of US 12 concurrency
Missoula	East Missoula	153.938	247.739	107	East Missoula	
Missoula	West Riverside	156.883	252.479	109	I-90 east / US 12 east – Butte	Eastern end of I-90/US 12 concurrency
Missoula	Bonner	157.962	254.215		S-210 east	
Missoula	Clearwater Junction	189.463	304.911		MT 83 north – Seeley Lake, Kalispell, Glacier National Park	
Powell		210.306	338.455		MT 141 south – Avon, Helmville	
Lewis and Clark		240.582	387.179		S-279 south – Helena	
Lewis and Clark	Rogers Pass	245.283	394.745		Continental Divide (elevation 5,610 ft or 1,710 m)	
Lewis and Clark		258.021	415.245		S-434 south – Wolf Creek, Bean Lake	
Lewis and Clark	Bowman's Corner	266.653	429.136		US 287 – Augusta, Wolf Creek	
Cascade	Simms	284.907	458.513		MT 21 west – Augusta	
Cascade	Simms	285.105	458.832		S-565 north	
Cascade	Sun River	297.067	478.083		US 89 north – Fairfield, Choteau, Glacier National Park	Western end of US 89 concurrency
Cascade	Vaughn	305.042	490.918	290	I-15 north / Lewis and Clark Trail – Shelby	Western end of I-15 concurrency; exit numbers follow I-15
Cascade		309.140	497.513	286	Manchester	
Cascade		313.018	503.754	282	To US 87 north / Northwest Bypass	Eastbound exit and westbound entrance
Cascade	Great Falls	314.997	506.939	280	I-15 BL south (Central Avenue West) to US 87 north	I-15 BL northern terminus
Cascade	Great Falls	316.586	509.496	278 —	I-15 south / Lewis and Clark Trail – Helena I-15 BL begins / I-315 begins / MT 3 begins (10th Avenue South)	Eastern end of I-15 concurrency; western end of I-15 BL / I-315 / MT 3 concurrency; I-315 is unsigned; I-15 BL southern terminus; I-315 / MT 3 western terminus
Cascade	Great Falls	316.921	510.035	0	14th Street Southwest	Exit number follows I-15 Bus. (I-315)
Cascade	Great Falls	317.414	510.828		I-315 ends / Fox Farm Road, 6th Street Southwest	Eastern terminus of I-315 and concurrency
Cascade	Great Falls	318.842– 318.927	513.126– 513.263		I-15 BL north (5th Street South / 6th Street South)	Eastern end of I-15 Bus. concurrency; one-way pair
Cascade	Great Falls	319.580– 319.660	514.314– 514.443		US 87 north (14th Street South / 15th Street South) / Lewis and Clark Trail – Black Eagle, Havre	Western end of US 87 concurrency; one-way pair
Cascade	Great Falls	322.760	519.432		US 87 Byp. north (57th Street South) – Malmstrom AFB	
Cascade		315.779	508.197		S-228 north / S-227 south – Highwood, Sand Coulee	
Cascade		338.597	544.919		S-331 north – Belt	
Cascade	Armington Junction	342.200	550.718		US 89 south – Monarch, White Sulphur Springs	Eastern end of US 89 concurrency
Judith Basin		352.727	567.659		S-427 south – White Sulphur Springs	
Judith Basin	Geyser	363.607	585.169		S-551 north – Geyser	
Judith Basin		378.899	609.779		MT 80 north – Stanford, Fort Benton	
Judith Basin		385.004	619.604		S-541 south	
Judith Basin		391.951	630.784		S-207 north – Benchland	
Judith Basin	Moccasin	396.968	638.858		S-426 north	
Judith Basin		400.744	644.935		S-239 west – Hobson, Utica	
Fergus	Eddies Corner	406.897	654.837		US 191 south / MT 3 south / Nez Perce Trail – Harlowton	Eastern end of MT 3 concurrency; western end of US 191 concurrency
Fergus		421.232	677.907		US 191 north / US 87 Byp. south (Truck Bypass) / Nez Perce Trail	Eastern end of US 191 concurrency
Fergus	Lewistown	421.232	677.907		US 87 Byp. (1st Avenue North; Truck Bypass) to US 191 / S-238 south – Great Falls	
Fergus		454.758	731.862		US 87 south / MT 19 north – Malta, Billings	Eastern end of US 87 concurrency; southern terminus of MT 19
Petroleum	Winnett	477.375	768.261		S-244 south – Winnett	
Petroleum		499.215	803.409		S-500 south	
Garfield		552.485	889.138		MT 59 south – Miles City	
Garfield	Jordan	553.355	890.539		S-245 west – Hell Creek State Park, Airport	Access to Hell Creek State Park via S-543 (jct 280 ft from MT 200)
Garfield		558.383	898.630		S-341 north	
Garfield		579.279	932.259		S-462 south	
Garfield–McCone county line	Flowing Well	588.930	947.791		MT 24 north – Fort Peck	
McCone		607.933	978.373		S-253 south – Brockway	
McCone		618.423	995.255		S-467 east	
McCone	Circle	619.496	996.982		S-252 west	
McCone	Circle	620.265	998.220		MT 13 north – Wolf Point	
McCone		621.309	999.900		MT 200S east – Glendive	
Dawson	Richey	649.106	1,044.635		S-254 – Richey, Glendive	
Richland		692.356	1,114.239		MT 16 south / MT 23 east / Lewis and Clark Trail – Watford City, Glendive	Western end of MT 16 concurrency
Richland	Sidney	694.924	1,118.372		MT 16 north – Regina, Culbertson, Airport	Eastern end of MT 16 concurrency
Richland	Fairview	706.223	1,136.556		S-201 west	
Richland		706.584	1,137.137		ND 200 east / Lewis and Clark Trail – Williston	Continuation into North Dakota
1.000 mi = 1.609 km; 1.000 km = 0.621 mi: Concurrency terminus; Incomplete access

== Related route ==
Montana Highway 200S
- Location: Circle–Glendive
- Length: 45.280 mi (72.871 km)
- Existed: 1967–present

Montana Highway 200S (MT 200S) is a spur route of MT 200 that branches off the main route near Circle and has an interchange with Interstate 94 shortly before terminating at the I-94 business loop in Glendive. MT 200S was originally part of MT 18, redesignated as MT 20S when MT 23 from Circle to Sidney was redesignated as MT 20 and received its current designation when MT 20 was redesignated as MT 200. In the state road log, MT 200S picks up the mileposts from route N-57 (C000057) from mileposts 279.109 to 323.472, for a total of 45.280 miles (72.871 km).

Major intersections

County	Location	mi	km	Destinations	Notes
McCone		0.000	0.000	MT 200 – Circle, Wolf Point, Sidney	Western terminus; highway continues as MT 200 west
Dawson	Lindsay	23.178	37.301	S-467 west	
Dawson	Lindsay	23.965	38.568	S-470 north	
Dawson	West Glendive	44.363	71.395	I-94 east – Bismarck	I-94 exit 211; no direct access to I-94 west
Dawson	West Glendive	45.280	72.871	I-94 BL to I-94 west – Glendive, Miles City, Billings	Eastern terminus
1.000 mi = 1.609 km; 1.000 km = 0.621 mi: Incomplete access
