= List of U.S. Highways in Montana =

U.S. Highways of the Montana Highway System
- Highway markers for U.S. Highway 2, 12, and 191

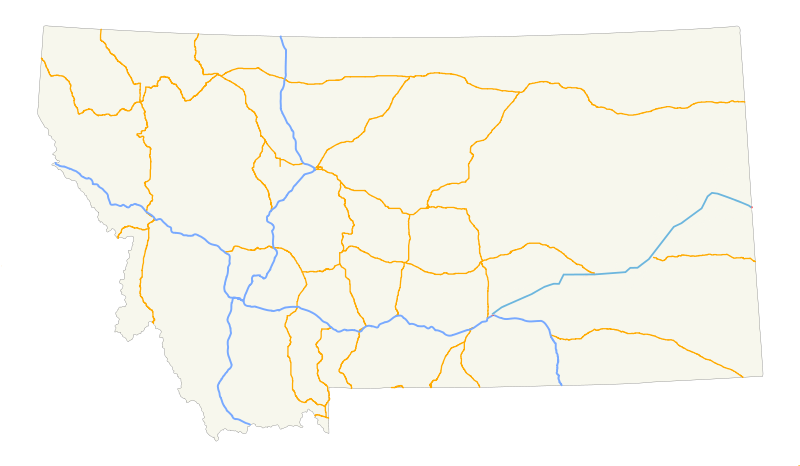
- Map of main highways (Interstate and U.S.)

System information
- Maintained by MDT

Highway names
- Interstates: Interstate n (I-n)
- US Highways: U.S. Highway n (US n)
- State: Montana Highway n (MT n)
- Secondary: Secondary Highway n (S-n)

System links
- Montana Highway System; Interstate; US; State; Secondary

The U.S. Highways in Montana are the segments of the United States Numbered Highway System owned and maintained by the Montana Department of Transportation (MDT) in the U.S. state of Montana.

== Mainline highways ==
Number	Length (mi)	Length (km)	Southern or western terminus	Northern or eastern terminus	Formed	Removed	Notes
US 2	667	1,073	US 2 west of Troy	US 2 east of Bainville	1926	current	
US 10	700	1,100	US 10 near Mullan, ID	US 10 near Beach, ND	1926	1986	Mostly replaced by I-90 and I-94
US 10N	112	180	Three Forks	Garrison	1930	1959	Replaced by MT 287 and US 12
US 10S	115	185	Three Forks	Garrison	1930	1959	Became mainline US 10
US 12	597	961	US 12 near Lolo Hot Springs	US 12 near Marmarth, ND	1926	current	
US 20	10	16	US 20 near West Yellowstone	Yellowstone National Park entrance at West Yellowstone	1940	current	
US 87	440	710	I-90/US 87 near Ranchester, WY	US 2 at Havre	1926	current	
US 87E	311	501	Armington	US 87E near Ranchester	1926	1934	Became mainline US 87
US 87W	209	336	Armington	Yellowstone National Park near Gardiner	1926	1934	Replaced by US 89
US 89	404	650	Yellowstone National Park near Gardiner	AB 2 near Port of Piegan	1934	current	
US 91	396	637	US 91 near Monida	AB 4 at Sweetgrass	1926	1980	Replaced by I-15
US 93	286	460	US 93 at Lost Trail Pass	BC 93 at Roosville, BC	1926	current	
US 191	438	705	Yellowstone National Park at West Yellowstone	SK 4 north of Loring	1926	current	
US 212	322	518	Yellowstone National Park at northeast entrance US 212 south of Red Lodge	US 212 near Cooke City US 212 near Alzada	1939	current	
US 287	282	454	Yellowstone National Park entrance at West Yellowstone	US 89 at Choteau	1965	current	
US 310	55	89	US 310/WYO 789 near Frannie, WY	I-90 Bus. at Laurel	1926	current	
US 312	225	362	US 12 in Billings	US 212 at Broadus	1959	1981	Replaced by MT 59 and US 10
US 789	—	—	Wyoming state line near Frannie	Canadian Border near Sweetgrass	—	—	Proposed, but never commissioned; would have followed (south to north) US 310, US 10/US 212, US 87, US 91
Former

== Special routes ==
Number	Length (mi)	Length (km)	Southern or western terminus	Northern or eastern terminus	Formed	Removed	Notes
US 10A	142	229	De Smet	US 10A near Heron	1941	1967	Replaced by MT 200
US 10A	62	100	Opportunity	Drummond	1936	1986	Replaced by MT 1
US 10 Byp.	—	—	—	—	—	—	Served Butte
US 10S Byp.	—	—	—	—	—	—	Served Butte
US 10 Byp.	—	—	—	—	—	—	Served Billings
US 12 Bus.	—	—	—	—	—	—	Serves Missoula
US 10 Bus.	—	—	—	—	—	—	Serves Helena
US 10 Byp.	—	—	—	—	—	—	Served Helena
Temp. US 10	—	—	—	—	—	—	Served Fallon and Ismay
US 87 Bus.	—	—	—	—	—	—	Serves Great Falls
US 89 Byp.	—	—	—	—	—	—	Served Great Falls
US 91 Byp.	—	—	—	—	—	—	Served Butte
US 91 Byp.	—	—	—	—	—	—	Served Helena
US 93 Alt.	4.5	7.2	US 93 south of Kalispell	US 93 north of Kalispell	2010	current	Included all segments open as of November 2013; expected completion in 2016
US 191 Bus.	—	—	—	—	—	2026	Served Lewistown
US 212 Byp.	—	—	—	—	—	—	Served Billings
Former
