= Ravalli, Montana =

- Census-designated place Unincorporated community
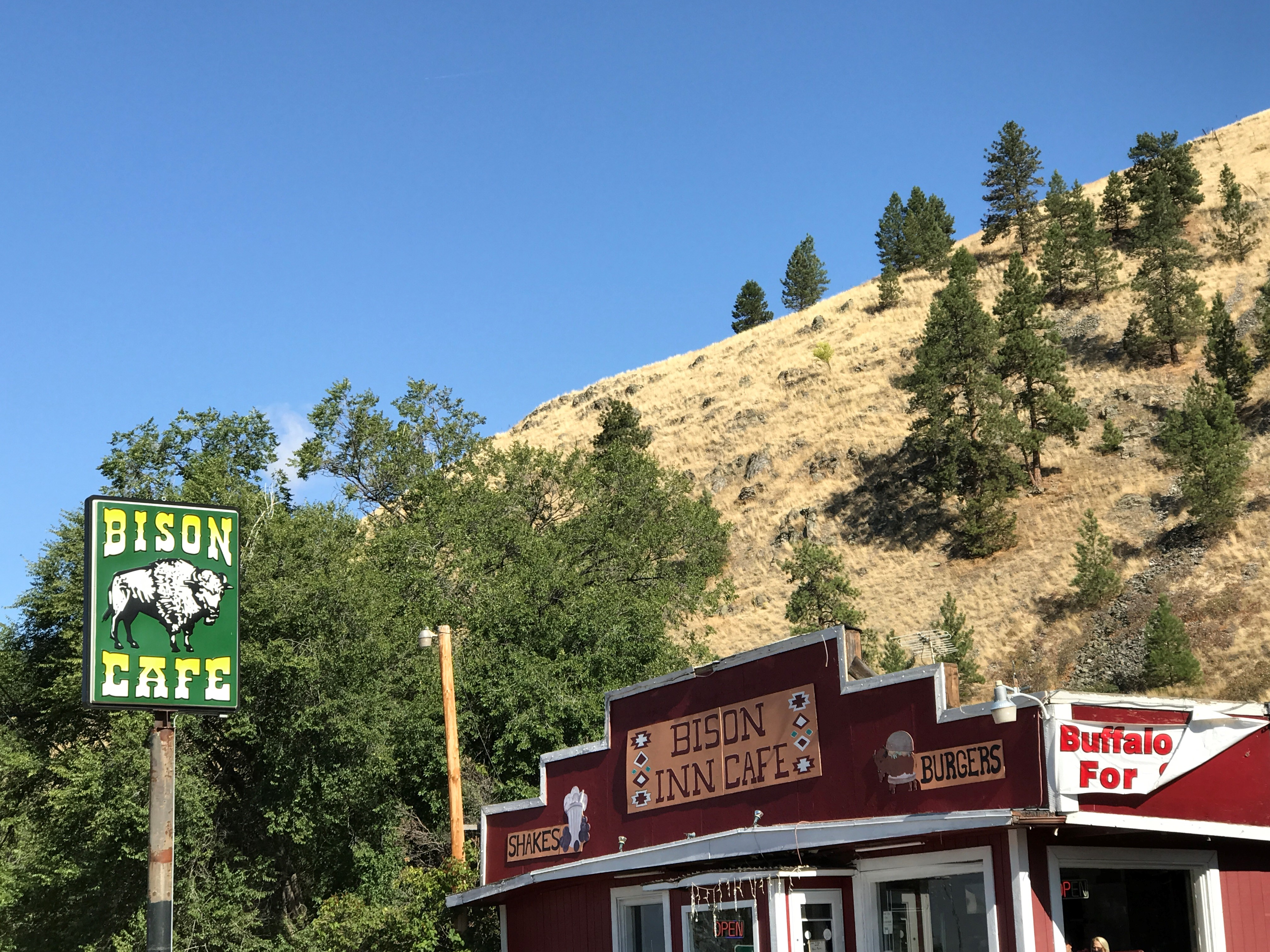

- Location of Ravalli, Montana
- Coordinates: 47°16′47″N 114°09′57″W
- Country: United States
- State: Montana
- County: Lake

Area
  - Total: 2.64 sq mi (6.84 km^{2})
  - Land: 2.63 sq mi (6.81 km^{2})
  - Water: 0.012 sq mi (0.03 km^{2})
- Elevation: 3,632 ft (1,107 m)

Population (2020)
  - Total: 85
  - Density: 32.3/sq mi (12.49/km^{2})
- Time zone: UTC-7 (Mountain (MST))
  - Summer (DST): UTC-6 (MDT)
- ZIP code: 59863
- Area code: 406
- FIPS code: 30-61075
- GNIS feature ID: 2409145

Ravalli (Salish: sk̓ʷɫólqʷe, sk̓ʷɫʔó) is an unincorporated community on the Flathead Indian Reservation in Lake County, Montana, United States. As of the 2020 census, Ravalli had a population of 85. For statistical purposes, the United States Census Bureau has defined Ravalli as a census-designated place (CDP). In the early 1900s, the Pablo-Allard herd in Ravalli was said to be the largest collection of the bison remaining in the U.S. and played a critical role in the conservation of bison.

== History ==
A post office called Ravalli was established in 1887 and remained in operation until 1983. The community was named for Antonio Ravalli, a Jesuit missionary to the Indians.

== Geography ==
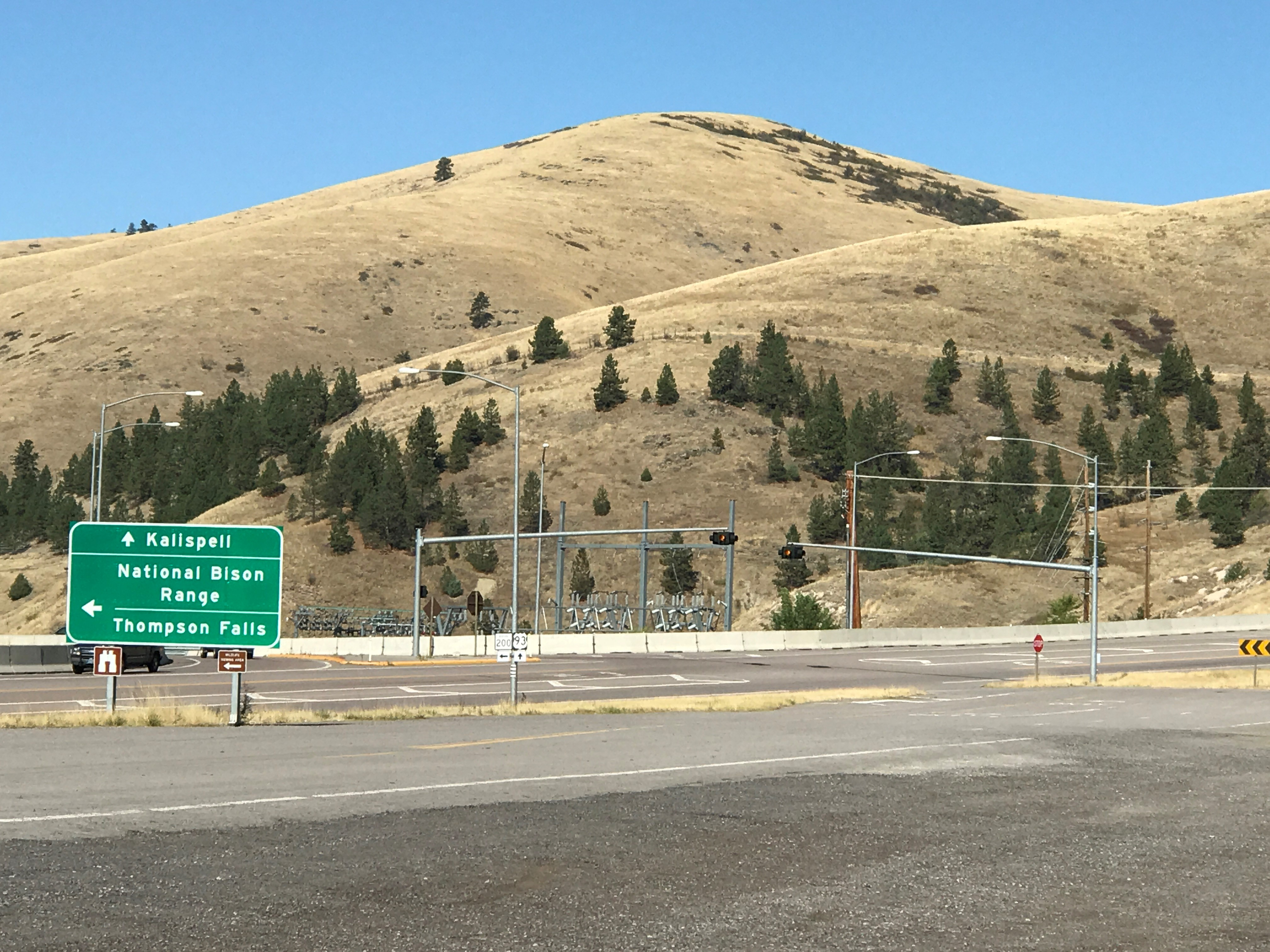
Junction of U.S. Route 93 and Montana Highway 200 at Ravalli, near the CSKT Bison Range

Ravalli is located in southern Lake County at the junction of U.S. Route 93 and Montana Highway 200, at the bottom of a big hill near the CSKT Bison Range. US 93 leads north 33 miles (53 km) to Polson, the Lake county seat, and south 36 miles (58 km) to Missoula. MT 200 leads west 7 miles (11 km) to Sčilíp.

According to the United States Census Bureau, the CDP has a total area of 2.6 square miles (6.8 km^{2}), of which 0.01 square miles (0.03 km^{2}), or 0.42%, are water. The community is in the valley of the Jocko River, which flows northwest to the Flathead River at Sčilíp.

=== Climate ===
This climatic region is typified by large seasonal temperature differences, with warm to hot (and often humid) summers and cold (sometimes severely cold) winters. According to the Köppen Climate Classification system, Ravalli has a humid continental climate, abbreviated "Dfb" on climate maps.

== Demographics ==
Historical population
Census	Pop.	Note	%±
2020	85		—
U.S. Decennial Census

As of the census of 2000, there were 119 people, 48 households, and 30 families residing in the CDP. The population density was 44.8 inhabitants per square mile (17.3/km^{2}). There were 52 housing units at an average density of 19.6 per square mile (7.6/km^{2}). The racial makeup of the CDP was 71.43% White, 27.73% Native American, and 0.84% from two or more races. Hispanic or Latino of any race were 6.72% of the population.

There were 48 households, out of which 33.3% had children under the age of 18 living with them, 41.7% were married couples living together, 6.3% had a female householder with no husband present, and 37.5% were non-families. 25.0% of all households were made up of individuals, and 10.4% had someone living alone who was 65 years of age or older. The average household size was 2.48 and the average family size was 3.03.

In the CDP, the population was spread out, with 27.7% under the age of 18, 7.6% from 18 to 24, 33.6% from 25 to 44, 20.2% from 45 to 64, and 10.9% who were 65 years of age or older. The median age was 34 years. For every 100 females, there were 98.3 males. For every 100 females age 18 and over, there were 100.0 males.

The median income for a household in the CDP was $26,750, and the median income for a family was $29,688. Males had a median income of $4,750 versus $32,708 for females. The per capita income for the CDP was $14,094. There were 16.0% of families and 24.0% of the population living below the poverty line, including no under eighteens and none of those over 64.
