= Paradise, Montana =

- CDP
- Location of Paradise, Montana
- Coordinates: 47°23′17″N 114°48′3″W
- Country: United States
- State: Montana
- County: Sanders
- Founded: 1883

Area
  - Total: 0.27 sq mi (0.69 km^{2})
  - Land: 0.25 sq mi (0.64 km^{2})
  - Water: 0.019 sq mi (0.05 km^{2})
- Elevation: 2,487 ft (758 m)

Population (2020)
  - Total: 166
  - Density: 672.5/sq mi (259.67/km^{2})
- Time zone: UTC-7 (Mountain (MST))
  - Summer (DST): UTC-6 (MDT)
- ZIP code: 59856
- Area code: 406
- FIPS code: 30-56425
- GNIS feature ID: 0788621

Paradise (Salish: čɫl̓q̓ʷe) is a census-designated place (CDP) in Sanders County, Montana, United States. The population was 166 at the 2020 census.

The community began in 1883, when the Northern Pacific Railroad chose the site as a division point. It was also the place where railroaders would change their watches from Mountain to Pacific time.

Paradise was part of Missoula County until 1906, when it became part of Sanders County.

== Geography ==
Paradise has an elevation of 2,250 feet (690 m). It is at the confluence of the Flathead River and Clark Fork River. Nearby Patrick's Knob reaches 6,775 feet (2,065 m).

According to the United States Census Bureau, the CDP has a total area of 0.2 square miles (0.52 km^{2}), all land.

== Demographics ==
Historical population
Census	Pop.	Note	%±
2020	166		—
U.S. Decennial Census

As of the census of 2000, there were 184 people, 83 households, and 52 families residing in the CDP. The population density was 766.7 inhabitants per square mile (296.0/km^{2}). There were 103 housing units at an average density of 429.2 per square mile (165.7/km^{2}). The racial makeup of the CDP was 95.65% White, 0.54% Native American, 1.09% from other races, and 2.72% from two or more races. Hispanic or Latino of any race were 1.09% of the population.

There were 83 households, out of which 26.5% had children under the age of 18 living with them, 45.8% were married couples living together, 13.3% had a female householder with no husband present, and 37.3% were non-families. 34.9% of all households were made up of individuals, and 19.3% had someone living alone who was 65 years of age or older. The average household size was 2.22 and the average family size was 2.85.

In the CDP, the population was spread out, with 25.0% under the age of 18, 5.4% from 18 to 24, 21.7% from 25 to 44, 27.7% from 45 to 64, and 20.1% who were 65 years of age or older. The median age was 42 years. For every 100 females, there were 85.9 males. For every 100 females age 18 and over, there were 84.0 males.

The median income for a household in the CDP was $18,750, and the median income for a family was $21,250. Males had a median income of $22,500 versus $13,750 for females. The per capita income for the CDP was $9,405. About 12.5% of families and 15.7% of the population were below the poverty line, including 22.0% of those under the age of eighteen and 12.9% of those 65 or over.

== Education ==
On Sunday, April 14, 2013, it was announced that the elementary school would close at the end of the school term due to lack of enrollment. There are only five students attending now. Previous student populations numbered in the sixties and seventies.

== Media ==
The Sanders County Ledger is a local newspaper. It is printed weekly and also available online.

== See also ==
- List of census-designated places in Montana
