= Sčilíp, Montana =

- Unincorporated community Census-designated place
- Sčilíp, Montana
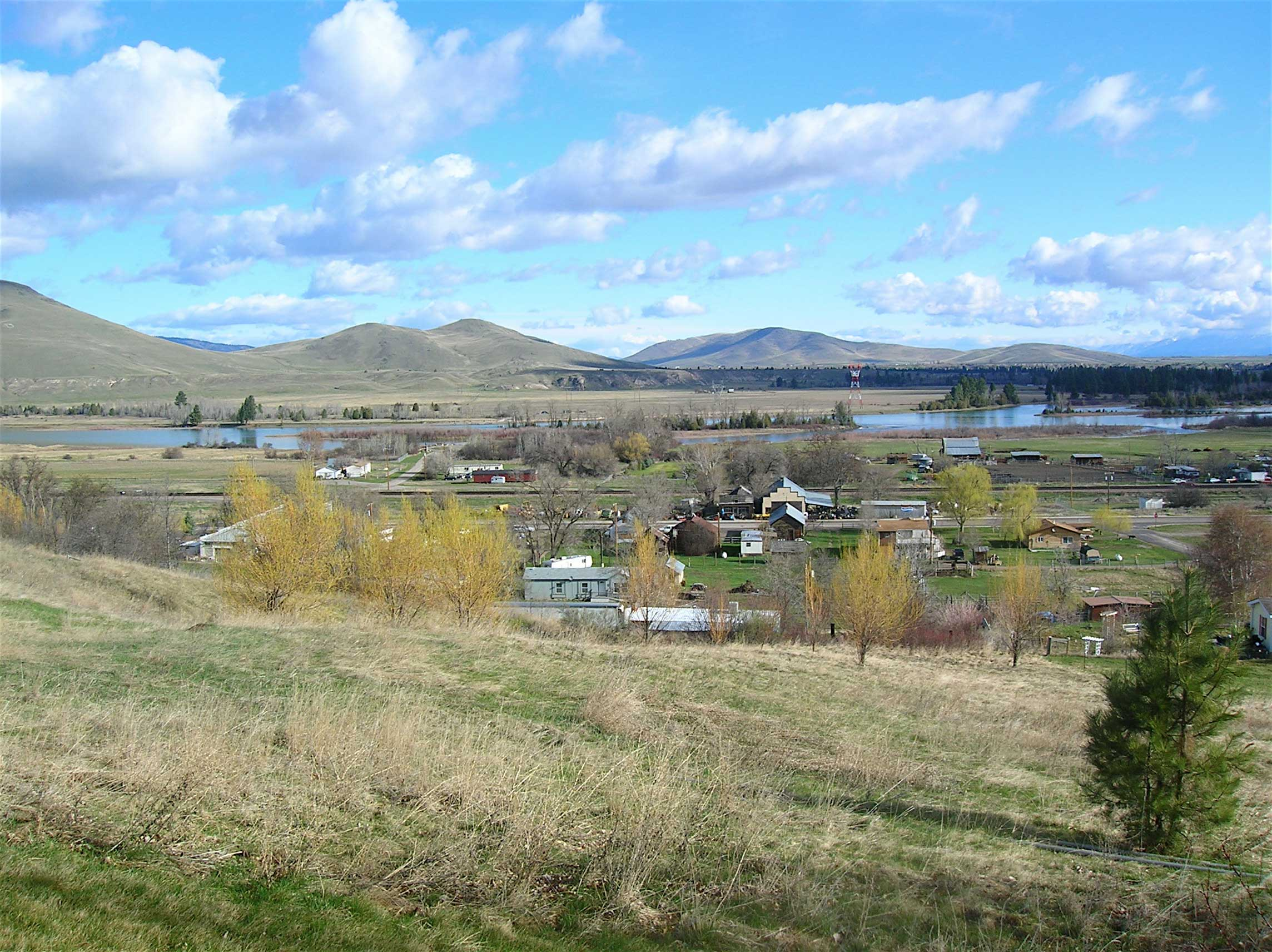
- View of Sčilíp from nearby hillside

- Location of Sčilíp, Montana
- Coordinates: 47°18′42″N 114°20′28″W
- Country: United States
- State: Montana
- County: Sanders
- Established: 1910

Area
  - Total: 6.90 sq mi (17.88 km^{2})
  - Land: 6.63 sq mi (17.16 km^{2})
  - Water: 0.28 sq mi (0.72 km^{2})
- Elevation: 2,523 ft (769 m)

Population (2020)
  - Total: 221
  - Density: 33.4/sq mi (12.88/km^{2})
- Time zone: UTC-7 (Mountain (MST))
  - Summer (DST): UTC-6 (MDT)
- ZIP code: 59831
- Area code: 406
- FIPS code: 30-20950
- GNIS feature ID: 0770675

Sčilíp is an unincorporated community in Sanders County, Montana, United States. It is a part of the Flathead Indian Reservation. The town sits adjacent to the lower Flathead River near the CSKT Bison Range. The town was originally named Dixon after Joseph M. Dixon, a Montana politician who championed and secured passage of the Flathead Allotment Act in 1904. For statistical purposes, the United States Census Bureau defined Dixon as a census-designated place (CDP). The population was 221 at the 2020 census.

== Geography ==
According to the United States Census Bureau, the CDP has a total area of 6.9 square miles (18 km^{2}), of which 6.6 square miles (17 km^{2}) is land and 0.3 square miles (0.78 km^{2}) (4.35%) is water.

== Demographics ==
Historical population
Census	Pop.	Note	%±
2020	221		—
U.S. Decennial Census

At the 2000 census, there were 216 people, 89 households and 54 families residing in the CDP. The population density was 32.5 inhabitants per square mile (12.5/km^{2}). There were 93 housing units at an average density of 14.0 per square mile (5.4/km^{2}). The racial makeup of the CDP was 75.46% White, 20.37% Native American, and 4.17% from two or more races. Hispanic or Latino of any race were 1.39% of the population.

There were 89 households, of which 29.2% had children under the age of 18 living with them, 46.1% were married couples living together, 7.9% had a female householder with no husband present, and 39.3% were non-families. 31.5% of all households were made up of individuals, and 15.7% had someone living alone who was 65 years of age or older. The average household size was 2.43 and the average family size was 3.07.

25.9% of the population were under the age of 18, 7.4% from 18 to 24, 20.4% from 25 to 44, 27.8% from 45 to 64, and 18.5% who were 65 years of age or older. The median age was 42 years. For every 100 females, there were 94.6 males. For every 100 females age 18 and over, there were 102.5 males.

The median household income was $15,455 and the family median income was $23,750. Males had a median income of $28,750 and females $16,250. The per capita income was $11,379. About 19.6% of families and 35.9% of the population were below the poverty line, including 45.5% of those under the age of eighteen and 22.2% of those 65 or over.

According to the most recent demographics data available from the Census Bureau released in December 2018, Figure 1 Dixon illustrates it has 203 population.

Of the 203 people living in Sčilíp, Montana, 95 are male and 108 are female, with the median age being 44. The total number of occupied homes in Sčilíp is 83, with 53 of them being Family led homes.

== Name change ==
On November 26, 2024, the United States Board on Geographic Names accepted a resolution by the Confederated Salish and Kootenai Tribes to rename the town Sčilíp. As part of the resolution, the tribes noted the negative effects of the Flathead Allotment Act and a belief that "a tribal community within the Reservation should not be named after an individual whose actions resulted in profound harm to the Tribes". The tribe has also requested that the United States Census Bureau and the United States Postal Service use the new name.

== In popular culture ==
The town is home to Dixon Melons, a local farm that grows melons that are popular throughout Montana.

The town is featured in the music video for the hip-hop-country artist Shaboozey's song "Highway", where he carjacks a local man after hitchhiking with him.
