= Wye, Montana =

- Census-designated place
- Location in Missoula County and the state of Montana
- Coordinates: 46°57′09″N 114°07′35″W
- Country: United States
- State: Montana
- County: Missoula

Area
  - Total: 2.92 sq mi (7.57 km^{2})
  - Land: 2.92 sq mi (7.57 km^{2})
  - Water: 0 sq mi (0.00 km^{2})
- Elevation: 3,288 ft (1,002 m)

Population (2020)
  - Total: 714
  - Density: 244.3/sq mi (94.34/km^{2})
- Time zone: UTC-7 (Mountain (MST))
  - Summer (DST): UTC-6 (MDT)
- ZIP Code: 59808 (Missoula)
- Area code: 406
- FIPS code: 30-81980
- GNIS feature ID: 2409631

Wye, known locally as the Wye, is an unincorporated community and census-designated place in Missoula County, Montana, United States. It is part of the Missoula metropolitan area. The population was 714 at the 2020 census, up from 511 in 2010. The community is named for the "y"-shaped DeSmet Junction where US 93 and MT 200 met former US 10 (immediately south of US 10's replacement, I-90).

== Geography ==
Wye is in central Missoula County, 2 miles (3 km) northwest of the Missoula city limits and 8 miles (13 km) northwest of downtown Missoula. Missoula Montana Airport is 3 miles (5 km) southeast of Wye.

According to the U.S. Census Bureau, the Wye CDP has a total area of 2.9 square miles (7.5 km^{2}), all land.

== Demographics ==
Historical population
Census	Pop.	Note	%±
2000	381		—
2010	511		34.1%
2020	714		39.7%
U.S. Decennial Census

As of the census of 2010, there were 511 people, 123 households, and 101 families residing in the CDP. The population density was 121.8 inhabitants per square mile (47.0/km^{2}). There were 126 housing units at an average density of 40.3 per square mile (15.6/km^{2}). The racial makeup of the CDP was 92.65% White, 1.84% Native American, and 5.51% from two or more races. Hispanic or Latino of any race were 1.57% of the population.

There were 123 households, out of which 50.4% had children under the age of 18 living with them, 67.5% were married couples living together, 8.9% had a female householder with no husband present, and 17.1% were non-families. 15.4% of all households were made up of individuals, and 3.3% had someone living alone who was 65 years of age or older. The average household size was 3.10 and the average family size was 3.36.

In the CDP, the population was spread out, with 36.2% under the age of 18, 4.2% from 18 to 24, 37.8% from 25 to 44, 17.3% from 45 to 64, and 4.5% who were 65 years of age or older. The median age was 31 years. For every 100 females, there were 107.1 males. For every 100 females age 18 and over, there were 105.9 males.

The median income for a household in the CDP was $53,500, and the median income for a family was $53,000. Males had a median income of $32,292 versus $27,857 for females. The per capita income for the CDP was $21,553. About 7.5% of families and 11.0% of the population were below the poverty line, including 15.5% of those under age 18 and none of those age 65 or over.

== Education ==
Northern portions of Wye are in a unified K-12 school district, Frenchtown K-12 Schools. Southern and eastern parts are in DeSmet Elementary School District and Missoula High School District.
