= Belt Jail =

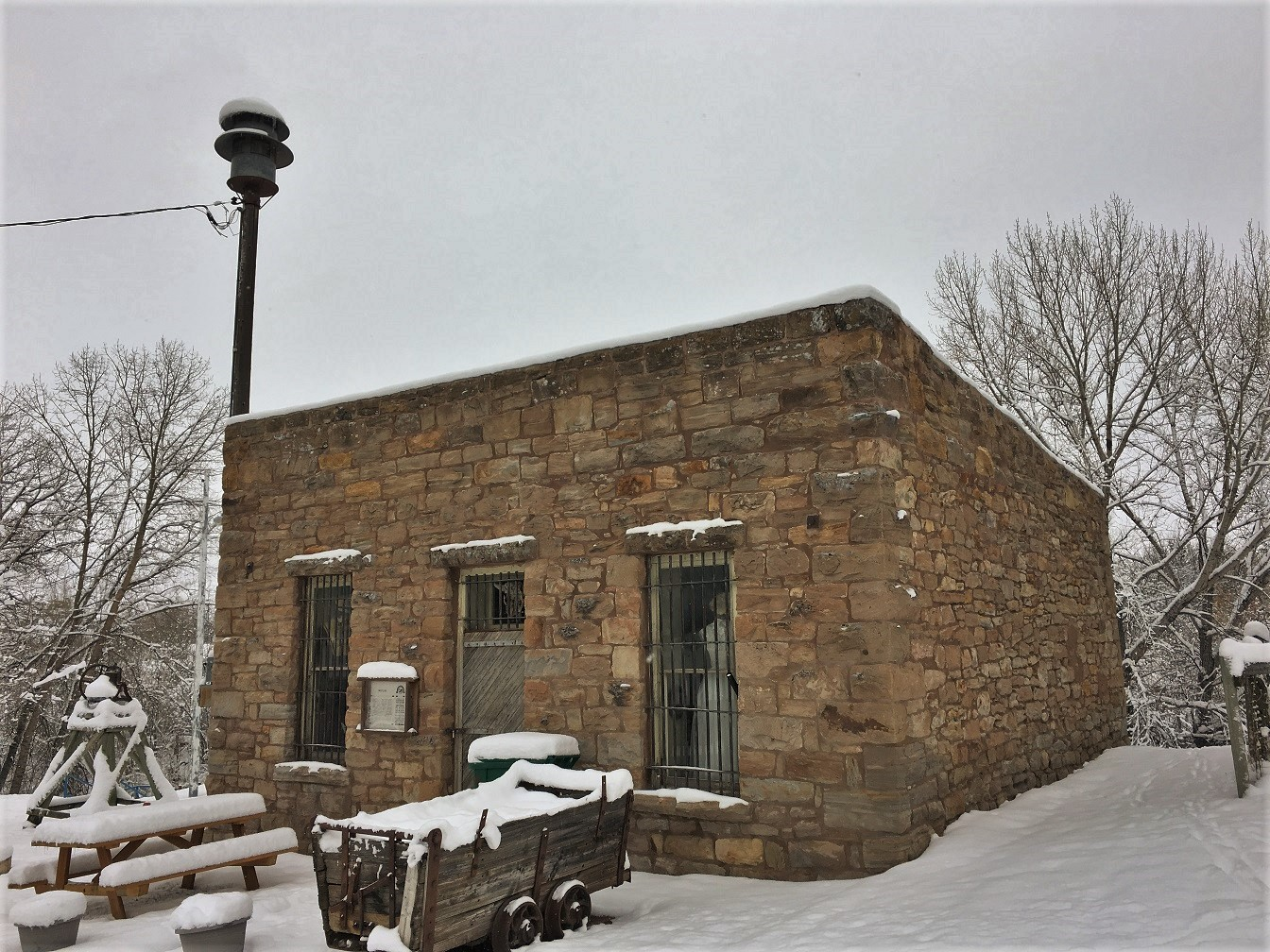
Belt Jail in November 2017

The Belt Jail is a historic jail under the National Registry of Historic Places. It is located in Belt, Montana.

== History ==
The Belt Jail was built during a boom occurring in Belt as a result of coalmining. Although the jail is confirmed to have been created in the 1890s, the exact year is unknown. Many estimate it was created in either 1887, 1895, or 1896. Some evidence says that in its early days, a humorist left a sign saying, "Holiday Inn, Belt, Montana. Free Room- Board, 1887"; although the verity of the sign is also unknown. Later after its creation, it survived an almost disastrous fire caused by a train wreck. Although the fire destroyed two nearby buildings, the Belt Jail survived due to a thick blanket of snow on its roof. Additionally, it survived a close flood on November 26, 1976. Later, the jail was restored and turned into the Belt Museum.

== Architecture and fittings ==
The jail measures 28' 4" by 30' 4". The exterior walls are made of buff colored sandstone placed in random patterns, and the ones on the west side are larger than those on the side and rear ones. Each sandstone brick measures over a foot thick. The window sills and lintels are rough faced dressed stones. The roof contains rough sawn 2 by 8's which is slightly pitched and contains a built-up covering. The walls contain a total of 5 windows, two being in the front facade, one on each side of the door, and 3 on the rear wall which are horizontal barred units set high. The interior of the jail contains a 15' 6" office and 3 whitewashed cells made of sawn 2 by 8's laid next to 8" walls. The jail's floor consists of T and G fir boards over floor joists. It is said that in the past due to the construction style of the floor, it would rot. The cell doors offered much of the protection to the jail with straps of 2-1/2" made of steel, designed to be too small for a person to put their hand through.

== See also ==
- Belt Creek
- Highwood, Montana
- Little Belt Mountains
- Highwood Mountains
- Kings Hill Pass
- Showdown Ski Area
- Monarch, Montana
- Neihart, Montana
- Armington, Montana
