= Montana Highway 3 =

State highway in Montana, United States

Montana Highway 3
- MT 3 highlighted in red

Route information
- Maintained by MDT
- Length: 221.770 mi (356.904 km)

Major junctions
- South end: I-90 / US 212 in Billings
- US 12 from Lavina to Harlowton; US 191 from Harlowton to Moore; US 87 in Moore; US 89 in Armington; US 87 in Great Falls
- North end: I-15 / US 89 in Great Falls

Location
- Country: United States
- State: Montana

Highway system
- Montana Highway System; Interstate; US; State; Secondary
← MT 2	→ MT 5

Montana Highway 3 (MT 3) is a highway in central Montana extending north from Billings to Great Falls.

== Route description ==
At its southern end, MT 3 begins at I-90 in Billings and travels northwest 47 miles (76 km) to US 12 near Lavina – this is the only section of MT 3 that is not concurrent with a US highway. MT 3 joins US 12 and travels 45 miles (72 km) west to Harlowton, where it leaves US 12 and joins US 191, and travels north for 39 miles (63 km) to Eddie's Corner (near Moore). At Eddie's Corner, MT 3 turns west, leaving US 191 and joining the US 87 / MT 200 concurrency, and travels west 65 miles (105 km) to Armington where US 89 joins the highway. The four highways continue 23 miles (37 km) to Great Falls, where it follows a 0.8-mile (1.3 km) concurrency with I-315 and ends at I-15.

MT 3 is part of the Camino Real Corridor (Corridor 27), a High Priority Corridor that connects El Paso, Texas to the Canada–United States border at Sweet Grass, Montana. The corridor is anchored by Interstate 25 and is part of the larger Ports-to-Plains Alliance. MT 3 is connected to the Canadian border via I-15, and is connected to I-25 in Buffalo, Wyoming via I-90.

== Major intersections ==
County	Location	mi	km	Destinations	Notes
Yellowstone	Billings	0.000	0.000	I-90 / US 212 to I-94 – Butte, Sheridan	I-90 exit 450; US 212 is unsigned
Yellowstone	Billings	1.298– 1.369	2.089– 2.203	I-90 BL (Montana Avenue / 1st Avenue North)	One-way couplet
Yellowstone	Billings	3.499	5.631	Main Street to US 87 – Billings Logan International Airport	Roundabout
Golden Valley		47.010	75.655	US 12 east – Roundup, Forsyth	Southern end of US 12 concurrency
Golden Valley	Ryegate	63.285	101.847	S-238 north / S-300 south – Ryegate Airport	
Wheatland	Shawmut	76.929	123.805	S-297 north	
Wheatland	Harlowton	92.188	148.362	US 12 west / US 191 south – Harlowton, Big Timber	Northern end of US 12 concurrency; southern end of US 191 concurrency
Wheatland	Judith Gap	109.990	177.012	S-297 south	
Fergus	Eddies Corner	131.421	211.502	US 87 south / US 191 north / MT 200 east – Lewistown	Northern end of US 191 concurrency; southern end of US 87/MT 200 concurrency
Judith Basin		137.574	221.404	S-239 west – Hobson, Utica	
Judith Basin	Moccasin	141.350	227.481	S-426 north	
Judith Basin		146.367	235.555	S-207 north – Benchland	
Judith Basin		153.314	246.735	S-541 south	
Judith Basin		159.419	256.560	MT 80 north – Stanford, Fort Benton	
Judith Basin	Geyser	174.711	281.170	S-551 north – Geyser	
Judith Basin		185.591	298.680	S-427 south – White Sulphur Springs	
Cascade	Armington Junction	196.118	315.621	US 89 south – Monarch, White Sulphur Springs	Southern end of US 89 concurrency
Cascade		199.721	321.420	S-331 north – Belt	
Cascade		212.577	342.110	S-227 north / S-228 south – Sand Coulee, Highwood	
Cascade	Great Falls	215.596	346.968	US 87 Byp. north (57th Street) – Malmstrom AFB	
Cascade	Great Falls	218.696– 218.776	351.957– 352.086	US 87 north (14th Street S / 15th Street S) – Black Eagle, Havre	Northern end of US 87 concurrency; one-way couplet
Cascade	Great Falls	219.429– 219.514	353.137– 353.274	I-15 BL north (5th Street S / 6th Street S)	Southern end of I-15 Bus. concurrency; one-way couplet
Cascade	Great Falls	220.942	355.572	I-315 begins / Fox Farm Road, 6th Street SW	Eastern terminus of unsigned I-315; southern end of I-315 concurrency; southern end of freeway
Cascade	Great Falls	221.435	356.365	14th Street Southwest	I-315 exit 0
Cascade	Great Falls	221.770	356.904	I-15 / US 89 north / MT 200 west – Helena, Shelby I-315 ends / I-15 BL ends	MT 3 / I-315 / I-15 BL northern terminus; I-15 exit 278
1.000 mi = 1.609 km; 1.000 km = 0.621 mi: Concurrency terminus
