= U.S. Route 89 in Montana =

U.S. Highway in Montana

U.S. Highway 89
- US 89 highlighted in red

Route information
- Maintained by MDT
- Length: 400.511 mi (644.560 km)
- Existed: 1934–present

Major junctions
- South end: Yellowstone National Park at Gardiner
- I-90 / US 191 in Livingston; US 12 near White Sulphur Springs; US 87 from Armington to Great Falls; MT 200 from Armington to Sun River; I-315 in Great Falls; I-15 from Great Falls to Vaughn; US 287 in Choteau; US 2 in Browning
- North end: Highway 2 at the Canadian border at Port of Piegan

Location
- Country: United States
- State: Montana
- Counties: Park, Meagher, Cascade, Teton, Pondera, Glacier

Highway system
- United States Numbered Highway System; List; Special; Divided; Montana Highway System; Interstate; US; State; Secondary
← MT 87	→ I-90

U.S. Highway 89 (US 89) is a north-south United States Numbered Highway in the state of Montana. It extends approximately 400.5 miles (644.5 km) from Yellowstone National Park north to the Canadian border. US 89 is an important tourist route within Montana as it connects Yellowstone National Park and Glacier National Park. The section of US 89 located between US 12 and US 87 is known as the Kings Hill Scenic Byway, which passes through the Little Belt Mountains in the Lewis and Clark National Forest, and is home to a wide variety of wildlife and provides many recreational opportunities for travelers along the route.

== Route description ==
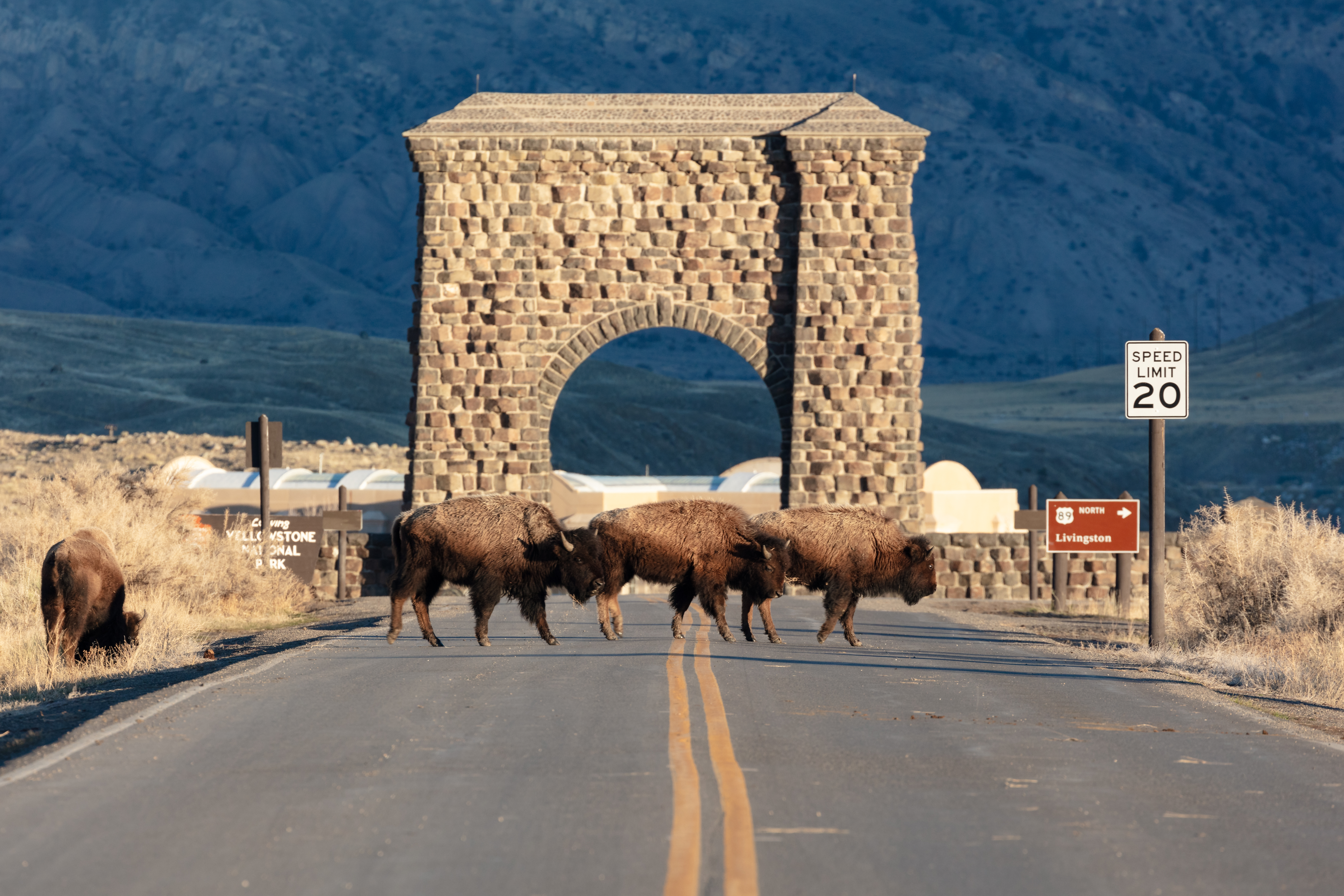
Roosevelt Arch looking towards the southern terminus of US 89 in Montana

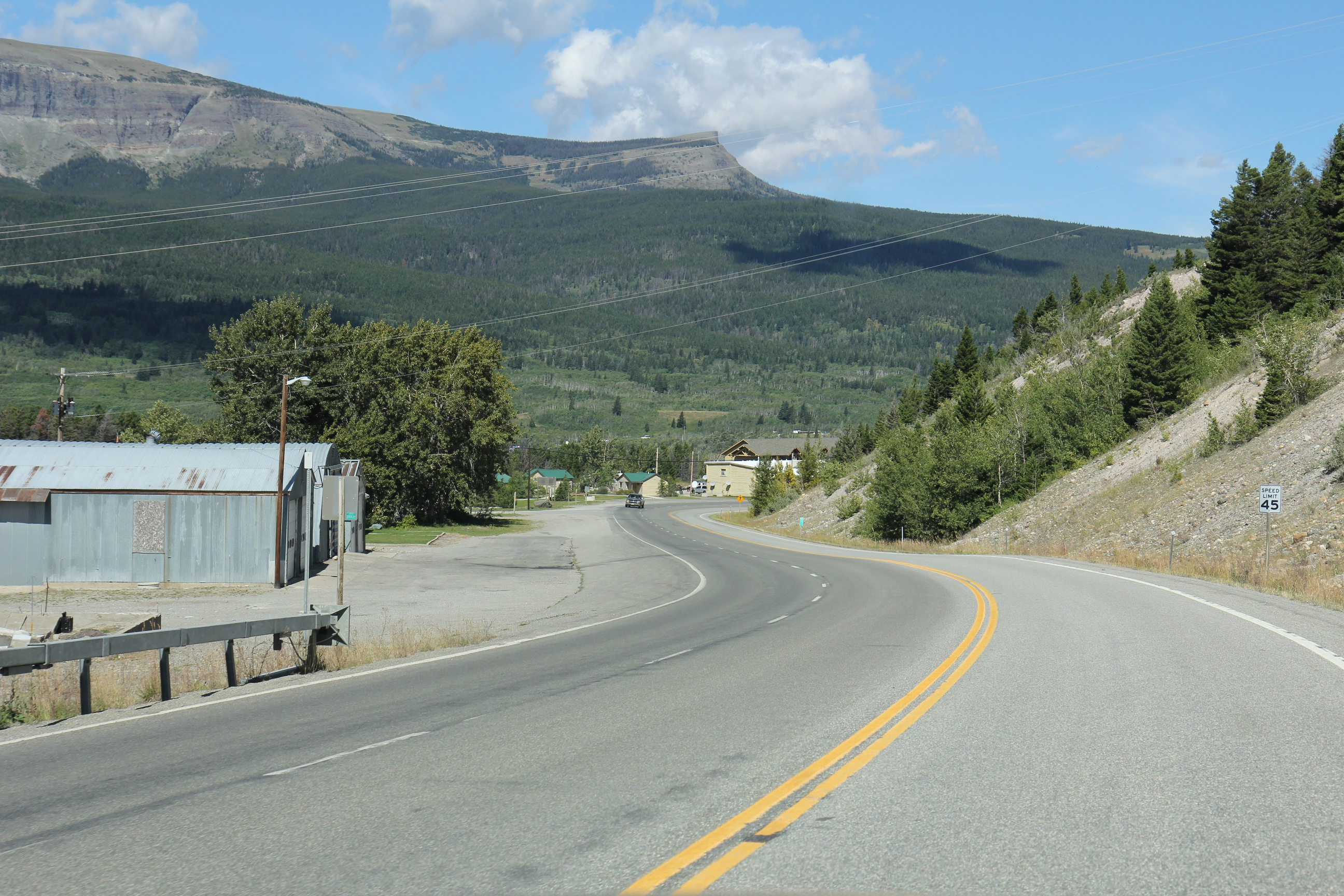
US 89 in St. Mary

US 89 enters Montana at the North Entrance of Yellowstone National Park, on the southern edge of Gardiner at the Roosevelt Arch; it is one of two entrances opened year-round (the other being the Northeast entrance on US 212). Some commercially produced maps show US 89 going through Yellowstone National Park; however, it officially has a gap inside the park and resumes in Wyoming at the South Entrance. US 89 travels north along the Yellowstone River for 52.9 miles (85.1 km) to Livingston, where it heads east along a 7.5-mile (12.1 km) concurrency with I-90/US 191. US 89 heads north for 56.7 miles (91.2 km); the route joins US 12 (which heads east towards Helena) for 8.4 miles (13.5 km) before entering White Sulphur Springs, and for another 3.0 miles (4.8 km) east of town, where it turns north and becomes the Kings Hill Scenic Byway. From US 12 the byway travels for 71.4 miles (114.9 km) through the Lewis and Clark National Forest, through the communities of Neihart and Monarch, and on to its junction with US 87. The route offers access to the Showdown Ski Area and Sluice Boxes State Park. The route travels over the Kings Hill Pass which snow removal crews work to keep open throughout the winter season.

At the northern end of the byway near Armington, US 89 joints US 87, Montana Highway 3 (MT 3), and MT 200; the four-route concurrency travels northwest for 22.7 miles (36.5 km) to Great Falls. As it travels through Great Falls along 10th Avenue South, US 87 branches north at 14th Street South, I-15 Business joins the route at 6th Street South, and it follows a short, unsigned concurrency with I-315 before reaching I-15. US 89 and MT 200 follow I-15 for 11.5 miles (18.5 km) to Vaughn, where they exit the Interstate and travels 7.9 miles (12.7 km) west to Sun River, at which point US 89 turns northwest and MT 200 heads southwest to Missoula. US 89 travels 32.4 miles (52.1 km) to US 287 in Choteau and another 68.8 miles (110.7 km) to US 2.

US 2 and US 89 share a 3.8-mile (6.1 km) concurrency through Browning and at a roundabout on the western end of town, US 2 heads southwest towards East Glacier and provides an all-weather link to the western end of Glacier National Park. US 89 heads west for 12.2 miles (19.6 km) and then turns north at Kiowa and travels north for 18.9 miles (30.4 km) to St. Mary where it intersects the Going-to-the-Sun Road, a seasonal scenic mountain road that traverses Glacier National Park. US 89 travels 12.9 miles (20.8 km) to the Chief Mountain Highway (MT 17), a road that travels through the northeastern corner of Glacier National Park and provides seasonal access to Canada's Waterton Lakes National Park by way of the Chief Mountain Border Station and Quarters (the only road that connects Waterton-Glacier International Peace Park). US 89 travels 6.2 miles (10.0 km) to its northern terminus at the Canadian border at Port of Piegan where the road continues into Alberta as Highway 2 towards Cardston.

== History ==
When US 89 was first created, it ran as far north as Spanish Fork, Utah. This was the case until 1934, when it was extended to more or less of its current alignment up to the Port of Piegan. North of Great Falls, US 89's route was originally part of the US 87 corridor until 1934. US 87 ended in Great Falls until 1945, when it was extended to its current northern terminus near Havre.

== Major intersections ==
County	Location	mi	km	Exit	Destinations	Notes
Park	Yellowstone National Park	0.000	0.000		North Entrance Road – Mammoth	Continuation into Wyoming; US 89 resumes at Yellowstone National Park's South Entrance
Park	Gardiner	0.000	0.000	Yellowstone National Park boundary (North Entrance); fees required		
Park		19.683	31.677		S-540 north (East River Road)	
Park	Emigrant	30.919	49.759		S-571 east	
Park		49.680	79.952		S-540 south (East River Road)	
Park	Livingston	52.917	85.162	333	I-90 west / US 191 south – Butte	Southern end of I-90 / US 191 concurrency; exit numbers follow I-90
Park	Livingston	57.865	93.125	337	I-90 BL west – Livingston	
Park		60.395	97.196	340	I-90 east / US 191 north – Billings	Northern end of I-90 / US 191 concurrency
Park	Wilsall	84.515	136.014		MT 86 south (Flathead Creek Road)	
Meagher		109.217	175.768		S-294 east – Lennep, Martinsdale	
Meagher		117.100	188.454		US 12 west – Townsend, Helena	Southern end of US 12 concurrency
Meagher	White Sulphur Springs	125.956	202.707		S-360 west – Fort Logan	
Meagher		128.899	207.443		US 12 east – Harlowton	Northern end of US 12 concurrency; southern end of Kings Hill Scenic Byway
Meagher		136.650	219.917		S-259 south	
Meagher–Cascade county line		157.478	253.436	Kings Hill Pass		
Cascade		182.257	293.314		S-427 north – Raynesford	
Cascade	Armington Junction	200.258	322.284		US 87 south / MT 3 south / MT 200 east – Lewistown	Southern end of US 87 / MT 3 / MT 200 concurrency; northern end of Kings Hill Scenic Byway
Cascade		203.861	328.082		S-331 north – Belt	
Cascade		216.717	348.772		S-227 north / S-228 south – Sand Coulee, Highwood	
Cascade	Great Falls	219.736	353.631		US 87 Byp. north (57th Street S) – Malmstrom AFB	
Cascade	Great Falls	222.836– 222.916	358.620– 358.749		US 87 north (14th Street S / 15th Street S) – Black Eagle, Havre	One-way pair; northern end of US 87 concurrency
Cascade	Great Falls	223.569– 223.654	359.799– 359.936		I-15 BL north (5th Street S / 6th Street S)	One-way pair; southern end of I-15 Bus. concurrency
Cascade	Great Falls	225.082	362.234		I-315 begins / Fox Farm Road, 6th Street SW	Eastern terminus of unsigned I-315; southern end of I-315 concurrency
Cascade	Great Falls	221.435	356.365	0	14th Street SW	Exit number follows I-315
Cascade	Great Falls	225.910	363.567	— 278	I-15 south – Helena I-315 ends / I-15 BL ends / MT 3 ends	Northern end of I-15 Bus. / MT 3 concurrency; southern end of I-15 concurrency; western termini of unsigned I-315 / I-15 BL / MT 3; exit numbers follow I-15
Cascade	Great Falls	227.499	366.124	280	I-15 BL south (Central Avenue W) to US 87 north	
Cascade		229.478	369.309	282	To US 87 north / Northwest Bypass	Southbound exit, northbound entrance
Cascade		233.356	375.550	286	Manchester	
Cascade	Vaughn	237.454	382.145	290	I-15 north – Shelby	Northern end of I-15 concurrency
Cascade	Sun River	245.429	394.980		MT 200 west – Missoula	Northern end of MT 200 concurrency
Teton		256.757	413.210		S-431 north / S-565 south – Simms	
Teton	Fairfield	260.096	418.584		S-408 west	
Teton	Choteau	277.723	446.952		US 287 south (W Division Street) – Helena	Northern terminus of US 287
Teton	Choteau	277.794	447.066		S-221 east (1st Street NE) – Dutton	
Teton		299.011	481.212		S-219 east – Pendroy, Conrad	
Pondera	Dupuyer	311.608	501.484		S-534 east – Conrad	
Pondera		320.566	515.901		MT 44 east – Valier, Lake Frances	
Glacier		346.489	557.620		US 2 east – Shelby	Southern end of US 2 concurrency
Glacier	Browning	349.755	562.876		S-464 north (East Boundary Street)	
Glacier	Browning	350.330	563.801		US 2 west – East Glacier	Northern end of US 2 concurrency; access to Glacier National Park
Glacier	Kiowa	362.524	583.426		MT 49 south (Looking Glass Hill Road) – East Glacier	MT 49 closed in winter
Glacier	St. Mary	381.469	613.915		Going-to-the-Sun Road – Glacier National Park	Going-to-the-Sun Road closed in winter
Glacier	Babb	388.754	625.639		S-464 south – Duck Lake	
Glacier		394.341	634.630		MT 17 north (Chief Mountain Highway) – Waterton Lakes	Chief Mountain Border Crossing open seasonally
Glacier	Port of Piegan	400.511	644.560	Piegan Border Crossing at Canada–United States border		
Glacier	Port of Piegan	400.511	644.560		Highway 2 north – Cardston	Continuation into Alberta
1.000 mi = 1.609 km; 1.000 km = 0.621 mi: Concurrency terminus; Incomplete access; Tolled; Route transition

== See also ==
U.S. Route 89
Previous state: Wyoming	Montana	Next state: Terminus
