= Kings Hill Pass =

Road in Montana, United States

- Interactive map of Kings Hill Pass
- Elevation: 7,385 ft (2,251 m)
- Traversed by: US 89

Third Approach
- Location: Meagher / Cascade counties, Montana, US
- Range: Little Belt Mountains
- Coordinates: 46°50′28″N 110°41′43″W

Kings Hill Pass is part of the Kings Hill Scenic Byway which passes through the Little Belt Mountains in the Lewis and Clark National Forest in Montana, United States. The route is home to a wide variety of wildlife and provides many recreational opportunities for travelers on the route. The Byway is a 71-mile route that begins on U.S. Highway 89 at its junction with U.S. Highway 12. From the junction the Byway travels north through the Lewis and Clark National Forest through the communities of Neihart and Monarch Montana and on to its junction with U.S. Highway 87. The route offers access to the ski area at Showdown, Montana and Sluice Boxes State Park. The route travels over the Kings Hill Pass near Monarch Montana which snow removal crews work to keep open throughout the winter season. Kings Hill Pass is at an elevation of 7,393 feet. There is an observation tower that offers views of the Lewis and Clark National Forest that is popular with visitors.

== Climate ==
Deadman Creek is a SNOTEL weather station situated near the southern base of Kings Hill Pass at an altitude of 6450 feet (1966 m).

Climate data for Deadman Creek, Montana, 1992–2020 normals, extremes 1991−present: 6450ft (1966m)
Month	Jan	Feb	Mar	Apr	May	Jun	Jul	Aug	Sep	Oct	Nov	Dec	Year
Record high °F (°C)	58 (14)	58 (14)	63 (17)	73 (23)	79 (26)	88 (31)	90 (32)	91 (33)	89 (32)	80 (27)	64 (18)	54 (12)	91 (33)
Mean maximum °F (°C)	47.9 (8.8)	48.8 (9.3)	56.6 (13.7)	64.4 (18.0)	71.9 (22.2)	78.1 (25.6)	83.4 (28.6)	83.4 (28.6)	78.7 (25.9)	68.0 (20.0)	54.6 (12.6)	44.6 (7.0)	85.1 (29.5)
Mean daily maximum °F (°C)	31.5 (−0.3)	32.8 (0.4)	40.8 (4.9)	46.7 (8.2)	55.0 (12.8)	62.5 (16.9)	72.6 (22.6)	71.6 (22.0)	61.9 (16.6)	48.1 (8.9)	37.1 (2.8)	29.6 (−1.3)	49.2 (9.5)
Daily mean °F (°C)	19.5 (−6.9)	19.2 (−7.1)	27.1 (−2.7)	33.8 (1.0)	42.1 (5.6)	49.1 (9.5)	56.1 (13.4)	54.7 (12.6)	47.2 (8.4)	36.3 (2.4)	26.0 (−3.3)	18.3 (−7.6)	35.8 (2.1)
Mean daily minimum °F (°C)	7.6 (−13.6)	5.6 (−14.7)	13.2 (−10.4)	20.9 (−6.2)	29.2 (−1.6)	35.6 (2.0)	39.5 (4.2)	37.9 (3.3)	32.4 (0.2)	24.6 (−4.1)	14.9 (−9.5)	6.8 (−14.0)	22.3 (−5.4)
Mean minimum °F (°C)	−19.6 (−28.7)	−21.6 (−29.8)	−11.6 (−24.2)	2.7 (−16.3)	16.3 (−8.7)	27.5 (−2.5)	31.3 (−0.4)	29.2 (−1.6)	22.3 (−5.4)	5.8 (−14.6)	−7.5 (−21.9)	−19.8 (−28.8)	−31.2 (−35.1)
Record low °F (°C)	−48 (−44)	−45 (−43)	−34 (−37)	−18 (−28)	1 (−17)	19 (−7)	26 (−3)	17 (−8)	8 (−13)	−25 (−32)	−29 (−34)	−43 (−42)	−48 (−44)
Average precipitation inches (mm)	2.13 (54)	1.83 (46)	1.99 (51)	2.69 (68)	3.67 (93)	3.60 (91)	1.84 (47)	1.82 (46)	1.51 (38)	1.87 (47)	1.96 (50)	1.95 (50)	26.86 (681)
Source 1: XMACIS2
Source 2: NOAA (Precipitation)

== See also ==
- Mountain passes in Montana
