= Transportation in Montana =

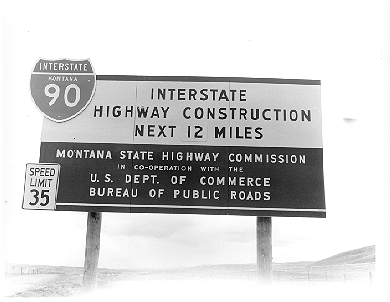
- Construction sign for I-90 in Montana during the mid-20th century

Overview
- Transit type: Rapid transit, commuter rail, buses, private automobile, taxicab, bicycle, pedestrian, highways
- Website: http://www.mdt.mt.gov/

Operation
- Operator: Montana Department of Transportation
Main highways map
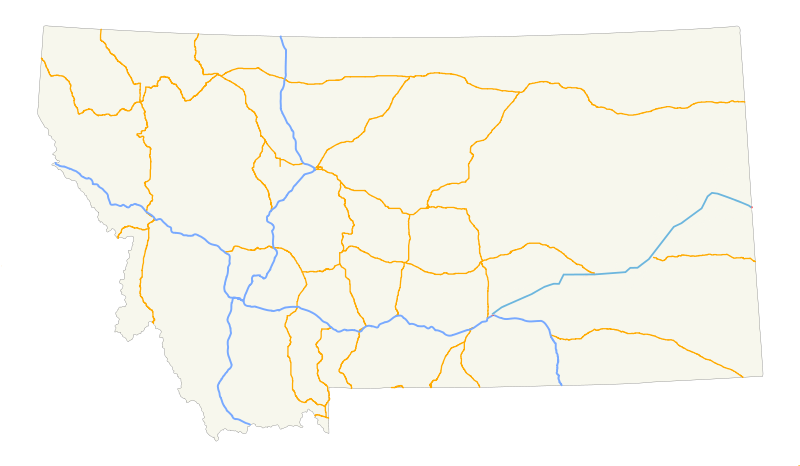

Transportation in Montana comprises many different forms of travel. Montana shares a long border with Canada, hence international crossings are prevalent in the northern section of the state; there are 13 road crossings and one rail crossing.

As the fourth-largest state in the United States, journeying from one side to the other takes a long time. The state has an extensive network of roads, including state highways, Interstate highways and U.S. routes. Rail connections are also well-established and were an important method of transportation in Montana since the 1880s. Within individual cities, public transportation includes high-frequency bus services.

For travel further afield, 16 airports are operational within Montana. Bozeman Yellowstone International Airport in Gallatin County is the busiest airport and there are another seven major airports and eight minor ones providing commercial services.

== Roads ==
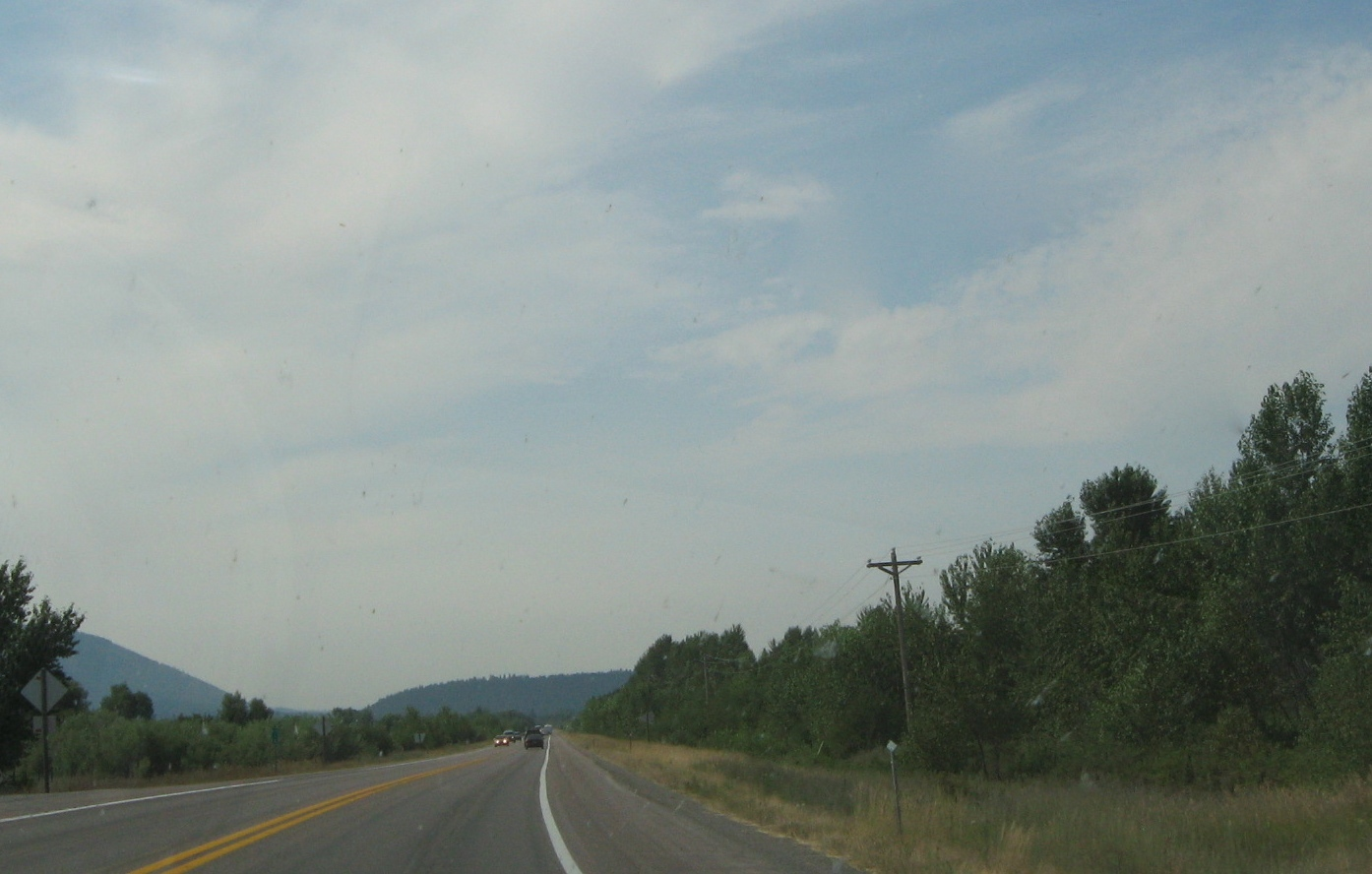
U.S. Route 93 in Montana

Montana has approximately 70,000 miles (110,000 km) of highways which start in, pass through or are entirely inside the state.

Prior to the creation of the state highway system and national numbered routes, a series of named auto trails traversed Montana and provided connections to other states. These included the Yellowstone Trail, Buffalo Trail, Vigilante Trail, and Green Trail.

=== Interstate highways ===
1,198.8 miles (1,929.3 km) of the Interstate Highway System, which serve as a thoroughfare for long-distance road journeys, is contained within Montana, and all of these are maintained by the Montana Department of Transportation (MDT). Speed limits are generally 80 mph (130 km/h) in rural areas and 65 mph (105 km/h) in urban areas.

Montana's Interstate highways are as follows:

- I-15 – Monida, Sweetgrass
  - I-115 – Butte, Downtown Butte
  - I-315 – Great Falls, Downtown Great Falls
- I-90 – Mullan, Ranchester
- I-94 – Billings, Beach

=== U.S. highways ===
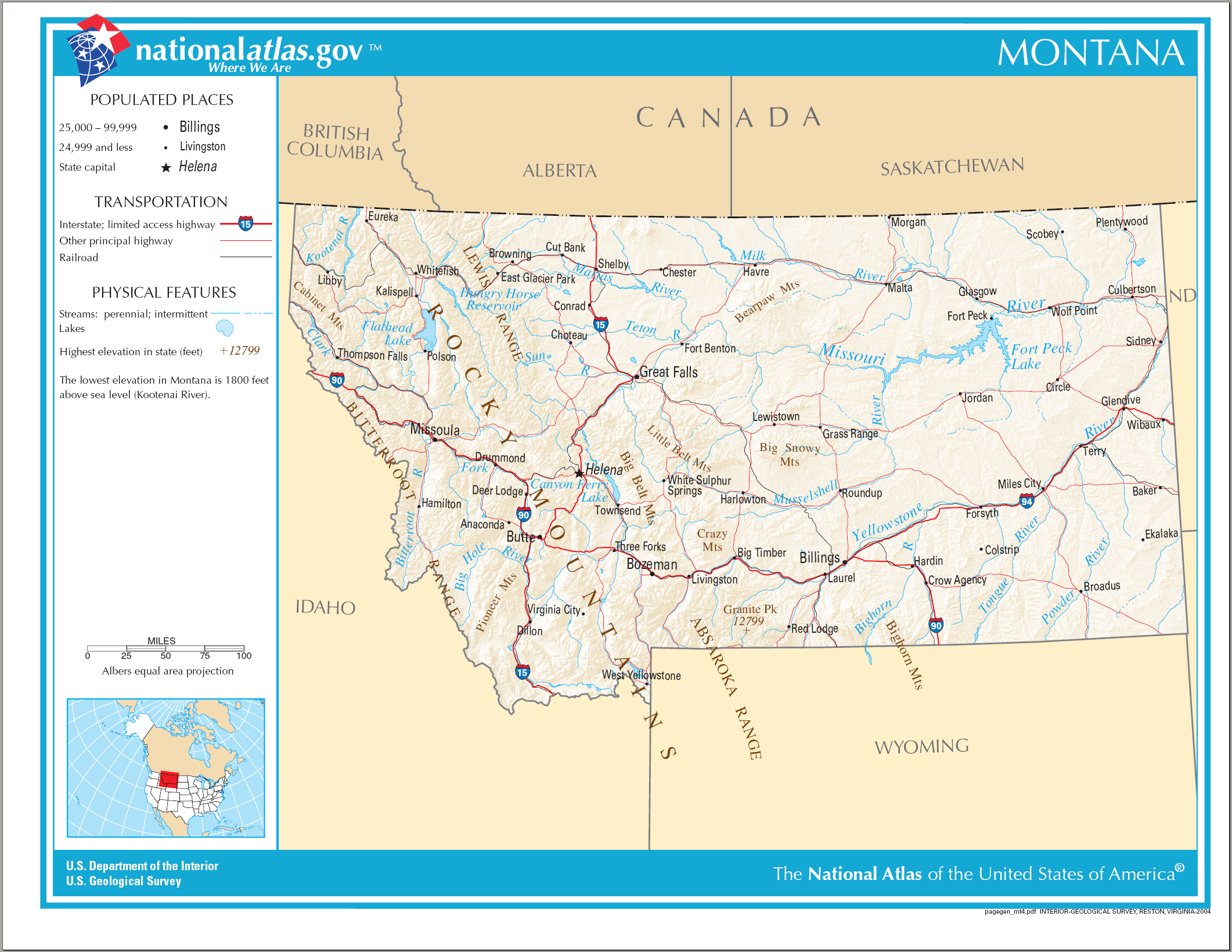
Click to enlarge detailed map

Eleven national U.S. routes are within the state, as seen in the list below:

- US 2 – Troy, Bainville
- US 12 – Lolo Hot Springs, Marmarth
- US 20 – Henrys Lake, Yellowstone National Park
- US 87 – Ranchester, Havre
- US 89 – Yellowstone National Park, Carway
- US 93 – Lost Trail Pass, Roosville
- US 93 Alt. – Kalispell Bypass
- US 191 – Yellowstone National Park, Loring
- US 212 – Red Lodge, Cooke City
- US 287 – Yellowstone National Park, Choteau
- US 310 – Frannie, Laurel

Two former national routes also ran through Montana before they were replaced by Interstates: US 10 and US 91.

=== State highways ===
In addition to these primary routes, Montana has a large number of state highways and smaller secondary routes. Speed limits on these roads are generally posted up to 70 mph (110 km/h) along rural areas.

=== Vehicles ===
Vehicles themselves in Montana are required to display a Montana license plate on the back and front by the Department of Motor Vehicles. Eight different primary plate designs have been issued since drivers were required to register their cars in 1913.

== Bus service ==
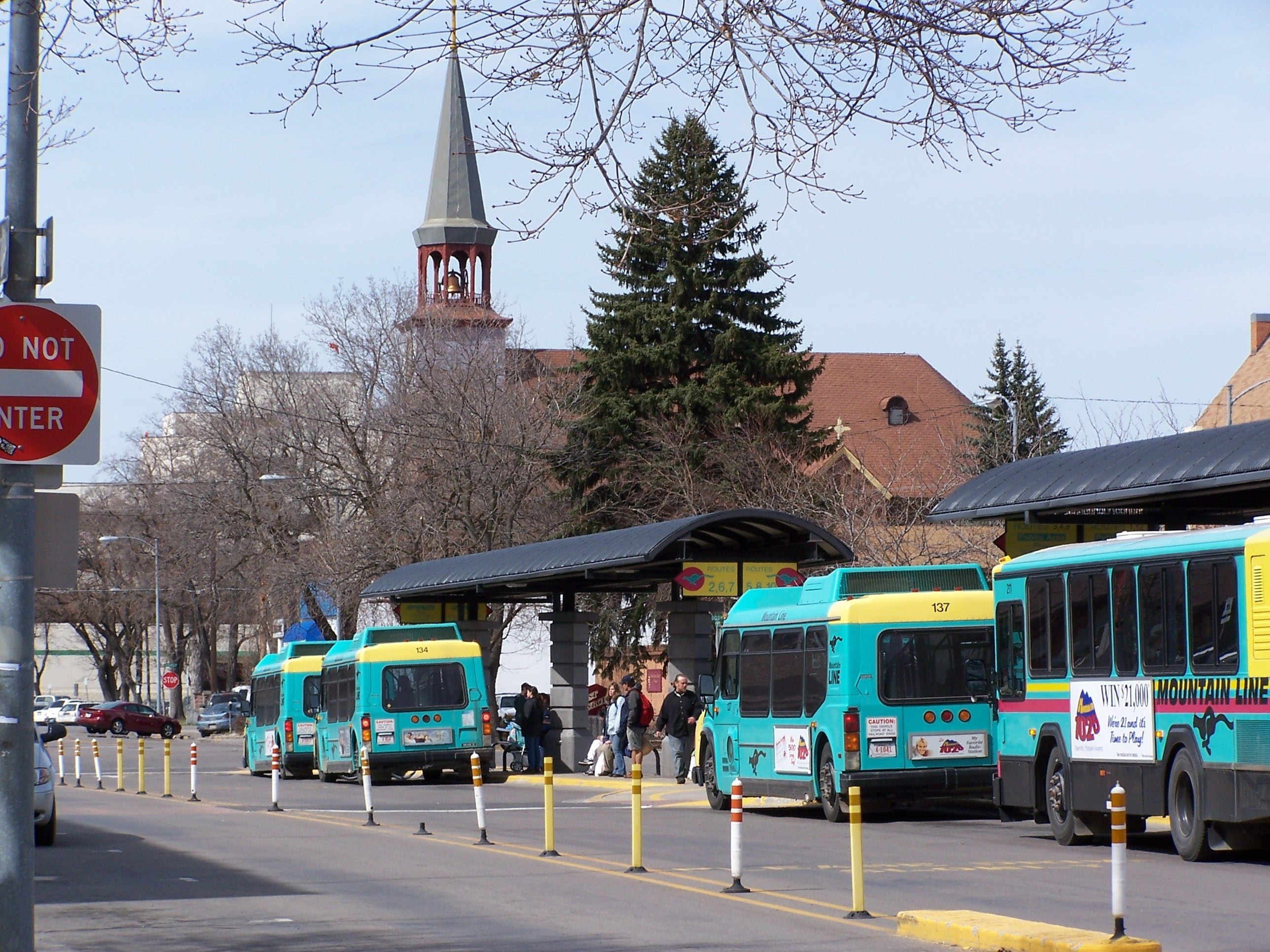
Mountain Line buses queue to pick up passengers in Missoula.

The public transportation system in Montana is sparse as a whole, but several individual cities have local bus networks.

=== Intercity bus service ===
Across Montana, the bus network does not have a large amount of intercity routes but Jefferson Lines goes to cities including Billings and Bozeman. Other carriers include Express Arrow.

=== Local bus service ===
Some individual cities have their own bus network provided by a transit corporation.

Missoula is served by ASUM Transportation and Mountain Line; The Mountain Line public transit system runs twelve services around the city and the University of Montana. It is indirectly controlled by the local government which have appointed members onto the board of the transportation district.

Billings is served by MET Transit and Great Falls by Great Falls Transit.

All four agencies run routes with fairly frequent schedules allowing commuters quick movement around different areas of the cities.

== Rail transport ==
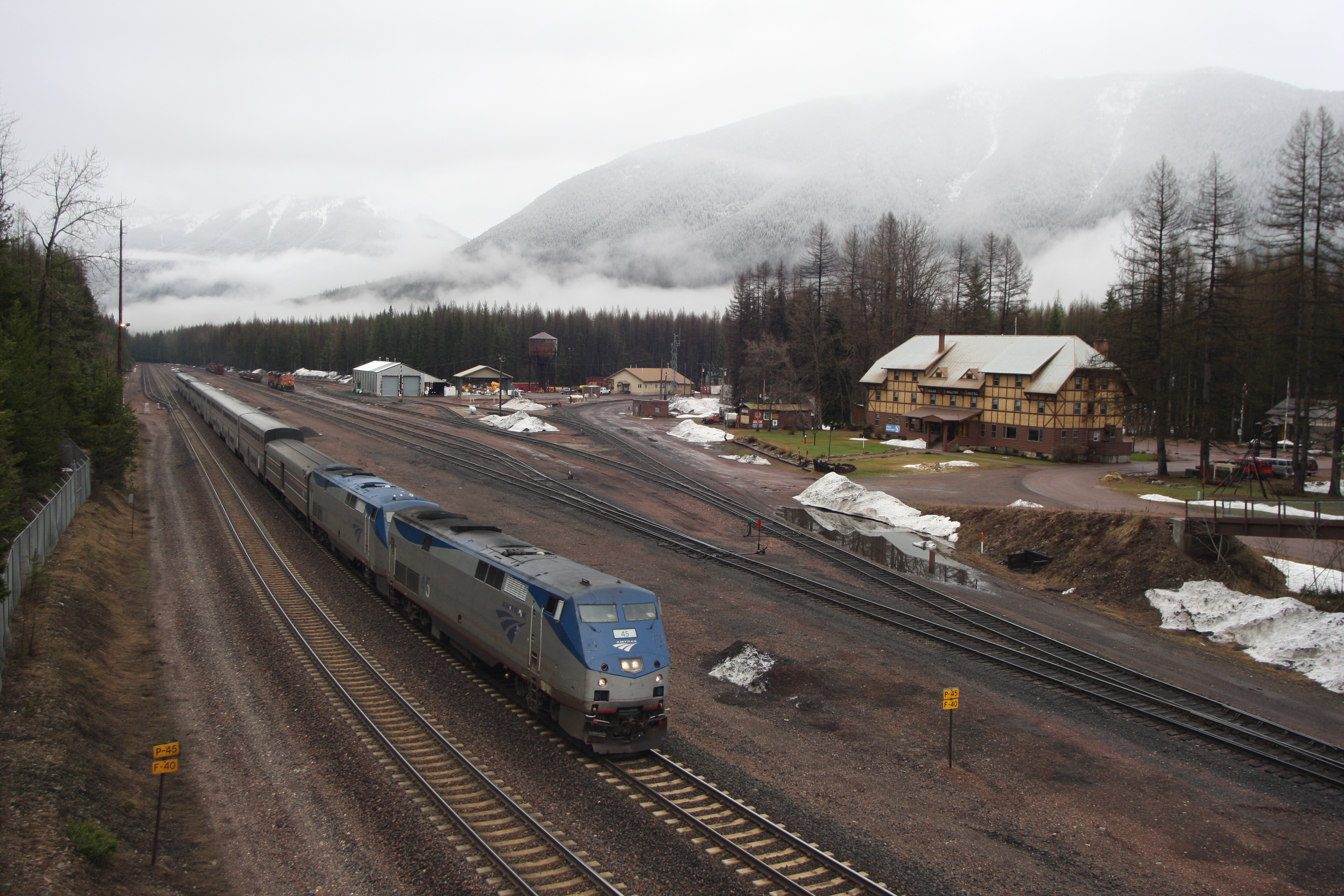
The Empire Builder in Essex

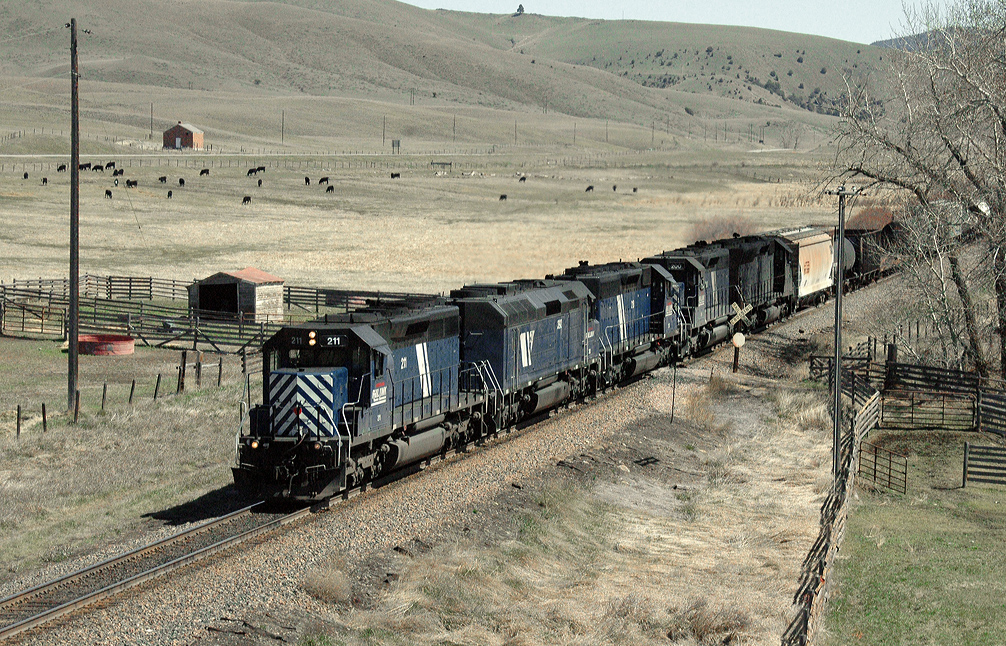
Montana Rail Link freight haulage in 2005

Historically, the state was traversed east-to-west by the main lines of three transcontinental routes: the Milwaukee Road, the Great Northern and the Northern Pacific.

All passenger rail in Montana is provided by Amtrak. The Empire Builder serves twelve stations along the northern tier of the state between North Dakota and Idaho. This daily long-distance train provides direct rail service westbound to Spokane, Seattle, and Portland, and eastbound to Fargo, St. Paul, Milwaukee, and Chicago. Southern Montana last saw passenger rail in 1979 when the North Coast Hiawatha was discontinued.

In terms of freight transportation, the BNSF Railway is the largest freight railroad with 1,983 miles (3,191 km) of track in Montana. The Class II Montana Rail Link operates 817 miles (1,315 km) of track leased from BNSF within the state. A number of other small railroad companies also exist.

=== Defunct railroads ===
Many now-defunct historical railroads existed in the industrial period of the 19th and early 20th century:

- Heron Lumber Company, Arlee, 1925 – 1933
- Donlan Company, Arlee, 1920 – 1928
- W. H. Best, Bigfork, 1937 – 1947
- Billings Traction Company, Billings, 1910 – 1917
- Billings & Central MT Railway, Billings, 1931 – 1921
- Rocky Fork & Cooke Railway, Billings, 1890 – 1898
- Western Lumber Company, Bonner, 1912 – 1928
- Big Blackfoot Midland Railroad, Bonner, 1903 – 1915
- Big Blackfoot Milling Company, Bonner, 1900 – 1915
- Anaconda Copper Mining Company, Bonner, 1904 – 1949
- The Camp Creek Railway, Bozeman, 1912 – 1914
- Gallatin Valley Railway, Bozeman, 1910 – 1918
- Butte Electric Railway/Butte City Street Railroad, Butte, 1886 – 1937
- Montana Railway, Butte, 1884 – 1908
- Montana Union Railway, Butte, 1886 – 1898
- Montana Southwestern Railway, Butte, 1931 – 1933
- Gaylord & Ruby Valley Railway, Butte, 1898 – 1899
- Butte, Anaconda & Pacific Railway, Butte, 1894 – 1985
- The Montana Central Railway, Central Montana, 1887 – 1907
- White Sulpher Springs & Yellowstone Park Railway, Central Montana, 1911 – 1980
- Montana Railroad Company, Central Montana, 1897 – 1910
- The Milwaukee Road, 1928 – 1980
- Burlington Northern Railroad, 1970 – 1996
- F. H. Stoltze Land & Lumber Company, Columbia Falls, 1933 – 1946
- State Lumber Company, Columbia Falls, 1913 – 1933
- A. O. Westburg Lumber Company, Columbia Falls, 1915 – 1932
- Columbia Lumber Company, Columbia Falls, 1917
- American Timber Company, Dayton, 1938 – 1940
- Hans Larson, Dayton, 1934 – ?
- Mann Lumber Company, De Borgia, 1908 – 1925
- Eureka Lumber Company, Eureka, 1915 – 1922
- P. L. Howe Lumber Mills, Eureka, 1919 – 1922
- Brooks-Scanlon Lumber Company, Eureka, 1922 – 1926
- Lincoln Logging & Lumber Company, Fortine, 1911 – 1918
- Rocky Mountain Railroad Company of Montana, Gardener, 1883 – 1898
- Missouri River Railway, Glendive, 1912 – 1914
- Helena Street Railway, Helena, 1886 – 1927
- Jessup Milling Company, Jessup, 1911 – 1917
- Dawson Lumber Company, Libby, 1910 – 1911
- The Shields River Valley Railway, Livingston, 1901 – 1914
- Montana Eastern Railway, North East Montana, 1913 – 1928
- Great Northern Railway, 1889 – 1970
- Polleys Lumber Company, Ronan, 1911 – 1934
- Harper Logging Company, Victor, 1940 – 1947
- Northern Pacific Railway, 1896 – 1970
- Gilmore and Pittsburgh Railroad, Armstead — Salmon, Idaho, 1910 — 1939

== Aviation ==
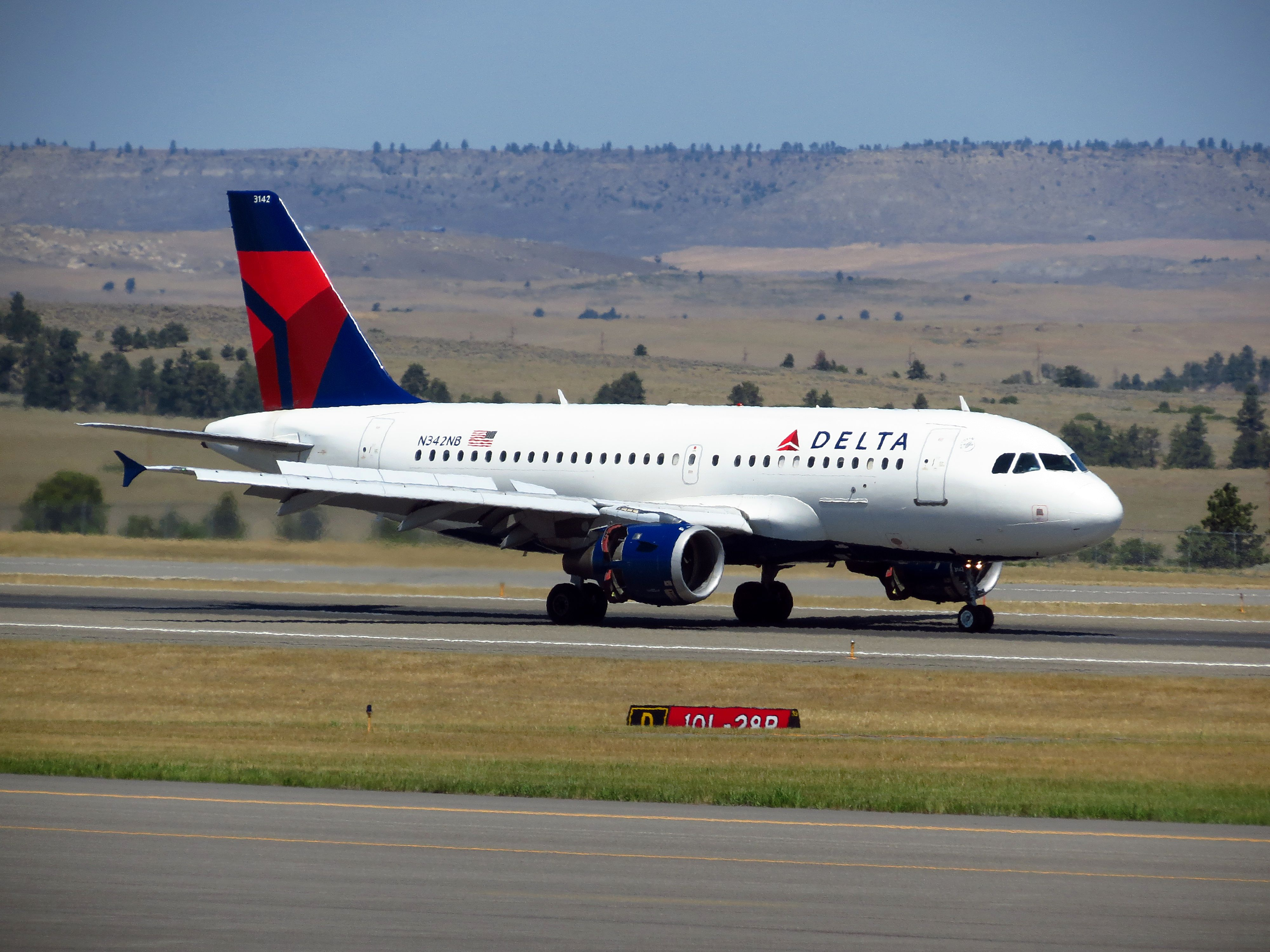
An Airbus A319 waits at Billings Logan International Airport.

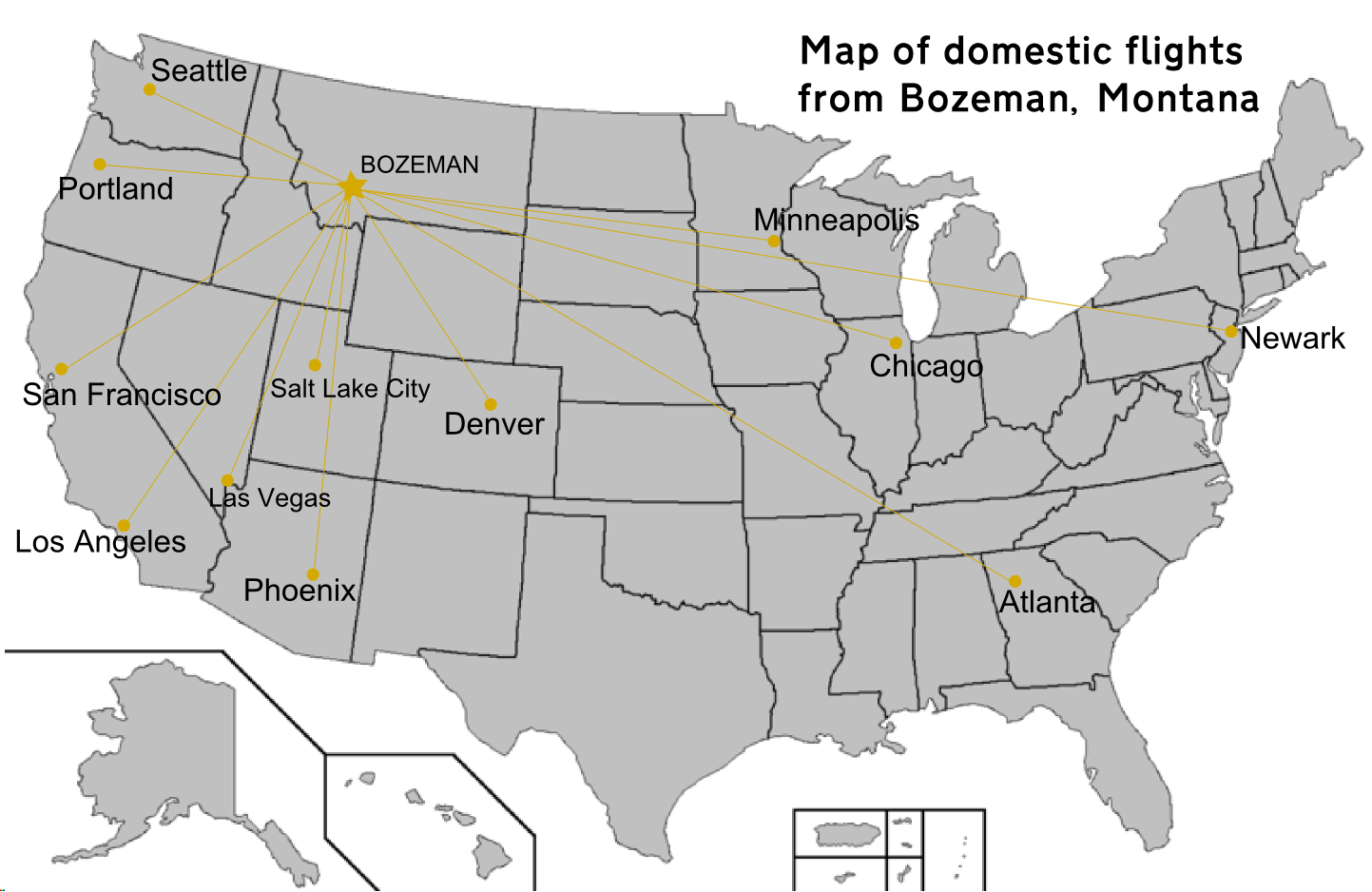
Map of domestic flights available from the largest airport in Montana (Click to enlarge)

Commercial air travel is common in Montana and there are up to 71 public and private airports in the state. The largest is Bozeman Yellowstone International Airport, located eight miles northwest of Bozeman, an hour and forty minutes away by road from Helena. The next largest is Billings Logan International Airport, near Billings, which has three runways and had over 388,000 enplanements in 2010.

The busiest domestic destinations from Montana are Denver, Colorado, Minneapolis, Minnesota and Salt Lake City, Utah, and the main airlines are Delta Air Lines and United Express.

== See also ==
- Plug-in electric vehicles in Montana
- Transportation in Idaho
- Transportation in North Dakota
- Transportation in South Dakota
- Transportation in Wyoming
