= Interstate 15 Business (Great Falls, Montana) =

Business route in Montana

Interstate 15 Business
- I-15 Bus. highlighted in red and unsigned I-315 highlighted in blue

Route information
- Business route of I-15
- Maintained by MDT
- Length: 5.834 mi (9.389 km)
- Existed: 1967–present

Major junctions
- South end: I-15 / US 89 / MT 3 / MT 200 south of Great Falls
- US 89 / MT 3 / MT 200 in Great Falls
- North end: I-15 / US 89 / MT 200 in Great Falls

Location
- Country: United States
- State: Montana
- Counties: Cascade

Highway system
- Interstate Highway System; Main; Auxiliary; Suffixed; Business; Future; Montana Highway System; Interstate; US; State; Secondary
← US 312	I-315	→ S-315

Interstate 15 Business (I-15 Bus.) is a business loop of Interstate 15 (I-15) in Cascade County, Montana, United States, almost entirely within Great Falls. The route links I-15 (which bypasses downtown Great Falls to the west) with the center of Great Falls. As its business loop designation implies, I-15 Bus. terminates at I-15 (running concurrently with US Highway 89, or US 89, and Montana Highway 200, or MT 200, through western Great Falls) at each end. The southernmost 0.83 miles (1.34 km) of the route from the interchange with I-15 to Fox Farm Road is designated, but not signed, as Interstate 315 (I-315). I-315 is the second shortest Interstate in the country; only the unsigned I-878 in New York is shorter; it is also the northernmost auxiliary Interstate of I-15.

== Route description ==
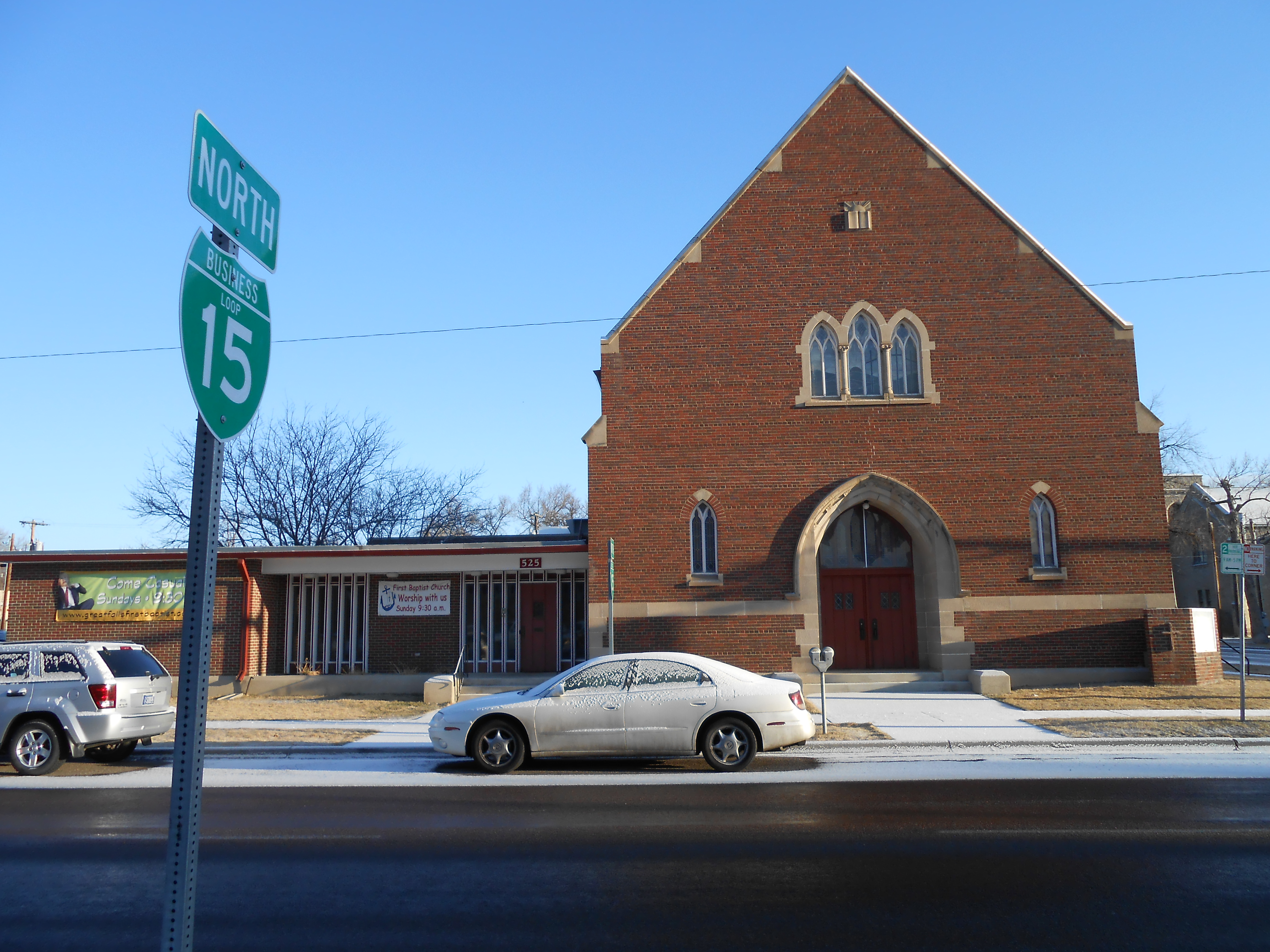
First Baptist Church, in the city center on 2nd Avenue, March 2013

I-15 Bus. begins at I-15 exit 278 in an unincorporated area of Cascade County, a short distance southwest of Great Falls. At the trumpet interchange, US 89 and MT 200 separate from I-15 and merge with I-15 Bus. Additionally, MT 3 begins at the interchange and follows the three routes to the east. Just east of the interchange with I-15, I-15 Bus. intersects 14th Street. The Interstate Highway standard conditions come to an end a short distance to the east at an intersection with Fox Farm Road. Here, the 0.83-mile (1.34 km) I-315 (designated along I-15 Bus. from I-15 to Fox Farm Road) comes to an end while I-15 Bus., US 89, MT 3, and MT 200 continue across the Missouri River into downtown Great Falls.

Within downtown, the four routes remain concurrent along 10th Avenue South to the parallel one-way couplet of 5th and 6th streets. I-15 Bus. northbound separates from US 89/MT 3/MT 200 at 6th Street, following the street northward through the city to the one-way 2nd Avenue North near the city center. I-15 Bus. turns to the west, following 2nd Avenue North to Park Street, then Park Street south to Central Avenue, where I-15 Bus. northbound rejoins the routing of I-15 Bus. southbound. Between Central Avenue and 10th Avenue South, I-15 Bus. southbound is routed along 1st Avenue North east to 5th Street South, then 5th Street South to 10th Avenue.

I-15 Bus. follows Central Avenue to the west, crossing the Missouri River once more as it exits downtown. After several intersections with local streets, I-15 Bus. terminates at I-15 exit 280. Central Avenue, however, continues westward from the exit.

== Major intersections ==
The entire route is in Cascade County.

Location	mi	km	Exit	Destinations	Notes
	0.000	0.000	—	I-15 / US 89 north / MT 200 west / MT 3 begins – Helena, Shelby	Western end of I-315/US 89/MT 3/MT 200 concurrency; I-15 exit 278
Great Falls	0.335	0.539	0	14th Street Southwest	Interchange
Great Falls	0.828	1.333	—	Fox Farm Road, 6th Street Southwest	Eastern end of I-315 concurrency
Great Falls	2.341	3.767		US 89 south / MT 3 south / MT 200 east (10th Avenue South) to US 87	Eastern end of US 89/MT 3/MT 200 concurrency; I-15 Bus. becomes 6th Street South (one-way street)
Great Falls	5.834	9.389		I-15 / US 89 / MT 200 – Helena, Shelby	Northern terminus; I-15 exit 280
1.000 mi = 1.609 km; 1.000 km = 0.621 mi: Concurrency terminus

== See also ==
- Business routes of Interstate 15 in Montana
