= Ryegate =

Ryegate may refer to:

- Ryegate, Montana, a town
- Ryegate, Vermont, a town

== See also ==
- Reigate
