= U.S. Route 87 in Montana =

U.S. Highway in Montana

U.S. Highway 87
- US 87 highlighted in red

Route information
- Maintained by MDT
- Length: 444.376 mi (715.154 km)
- Existed: 1926–present

Major junctions
- South end: I-90 / US 87 at the Wyoming state line near Ranchester, WY
- US 212 from Crow Agency to Billings; I-90 / I-94 in Billings; US 12 in Roundup.; US 191 from Lewistown to Moore; US 89 from Armington to Great Falls
- North end: US 2 near Havre

Location
- Country: United States
- State: Montana
- Counties: Big Horn, Yellowstone, Musselshell, Petroleum, Fergus, Judith Basin, Cascade, Chouteau, Hill

Highway system
- United States Numbered Highway System; List; Special; Divided; Montana Highway System; Interstate; US; State; Secondary
← MT 86	→ MT 87

U.S. Route 87 (US 87) is a part of the U.S. Highway System that travels Port Lavaca, Texas, north to Havre, Montana. In the state of Montana, It extends approximately 444 miles (715 km) from the Wyoming state line near Wyola north to its terminus at US 2 near Havre.

== Route description ==
US 87 enters Montana running concurrently with Interstate 90 (I-90) and travels westward for 45.3 miles (72.9 km) to Crow Agency, where US 212 merges with the route. The three routes continue westward for another 54.6 miles (87.9 km) to Billings, where it intersects with the western terminus of I-94 in suburban Lockwood. US 87 follows the I-90/US 212 concurrency for another 3.3 miles (5.3 km) before it heads north, following Main Street through Billings Heights. US 87 continues north for 51 miles (82 km) and intersects US 12, sharing a 2.1-mile (3.4 km) concurrency through Roundup. US 87 continues north with a slight bend to the northwest for 44.7 miles (71.9 km) until it intersects Montana State Highway 200 (MT 200) near Grass Range and takes a sharp turn west; US 87 remains concurrent with MT 200 until Great Falls. US 87 and MT 200 travel west for 30.6 miles (49.2 km) to Lewistown, where they merge with US 191 and continue heading generally westward. About 14.3 miles (23.0 km) west of Lewistown near Moore, it breaks with US 191 and merges with MT 3, where they head northwest for 64.7 miles (104.1 km) and merge with US 89 near Armington. The four-route concurrency of US 87/US 89/MT 3/MT 200 continues northwest for 22.7 miles (36.5 km) to Great Falls, where US 87 leaves all three and travels north through the city. North of Great Falls, US 87 travels northeast for 37.4 miles (60.2 km) to Fort Benton and a final 70 miles (110 km) to its terminus with US 2, about two miles (3.2 km) west of Havre.

== History ==
US 87 originally ran northwest out of Great Falls towards the eastern border of Glacier National Park to the Canadian Border at the Piegan Border Crossing. This was changed in 1934, when US 89 was diverted to US 87's routing north of Great Falls. US 87 terminated in Great Falls until c. 1945 when it was extended to its current northern terminus near Havre.

== Major intersections ==
County	Location	mi	km	Destinations	Notes
Big Horn		0.000	0.000	I-90 east / US 87 south – Sheridan	Continuation into Wyoming
See I-90 (exits 452-549)
Yellowstone	Lockwood	103.288	166.226	I-90 west / US 212 west / I-90 BL begins – Butte	I-90 exit 452; north end of I-90 / US 212 concurrency; south end of I-90 BL concurrency
Yellowstone	Billings	104.552	168.260	I-90 BL west (1st Avenue N) – Billings City Center	North end of I-90 BL concurrency
Musselshell	Camp Three	152.198	244.939	US 12 west – Harlowton	South end of US 12 concurrency
Musselshell	Roundup	154.266	248.267	US 12 east – Forsyth	North end of US 12 concurrency
Musselshell		174.686	281.130	S-244 north – Winnett	
Petroleum	No major junctions				
Fergus		198.930	320.147	MT 19 east / MT 200 north – Malta, Jordan	South end of MT 200 concurrency; southern terminus of MT 19
Fergus	Lewistown	229.517	369.372	US 87 Byp. north (Truck Bypass) to US 191 / S-238 south (1st Avenue) – Great Falls	Former US 191 Bus.
Fergus	Lewistown	232.456	374.102	US 191 north / US 87 Byp. south (Truck Bypass)	South end of US 191 concurrency
Fergus	Eddies Corner	246.791	397.172	US 191 south / MT 3 south – Harlowton	North end of US 191 concurrency; south end of MT 3 concurrency
Judith Basin		252.944	407.074	S-239 west – Hobson, Utica	
Judith Basin	Moccasin	256.720	413.151	S-426 north	
Judith Basin		261.737	421.225	S-207 north – Benchland	
Judith Basin		268.684	432.405	S-541 south	
Judith Basin		274.789	442.230	MT 80 north – Stanford, Fort Benton	MT 80 southern terminus
Judith Basin	Geyser	290.081	466.840	S-551 north – Geyser	
Judith Basin		300.961	484.350	S-427 south – White Sulphur Springs	
Cascade	Armington Junction	311.488	501.291	US 89 south – Monarch, White Sulphur Springs	South end of US 89 concurrency
Cascade		315.091	507.090	S-331 north – Belt	
Cascade		327.947	527.780	S-227 north / S-228 south – Sand Coulee, Highwood	
Cascade	Great Falls	330.966	532.638	US 87 Byp. north (57th Street) – Malmstrom AFB	
Cascade	Great Falls	334.146	537.756	US 89 north / MT 3 west / MT 200 west (10th Avenue S) to I-15	North end of US 89 / MT 3 / MT 200 concurrency
Cascade	Great Falls	335.893	540.567	River Drive (US 87 Byp. south)	
Cascade	Great Falls	337.008	542.362	Northwest Bypass to I-15 / US 89 north / MT 200 west	
Cascade	Great Falls	337.130	542.558	S-225 north (Bootlegger Trail)	
Chouteau	Carter	360.532	580.220	S-564 north	
Chouteau		372.817	599.991	S-386 east	
Chouteau		374.400	602.538	S-223 north / MT 80 south – Tiber Dam, Chester, Fort Benton	MT 80 northern terminus
Chouteau		376.909	606.576	S-387 south – Fort Benton	
Chouteau	Big Sandy	412.379	663.660	S-432 north (Kenilworth Road) / S-236 south (Judith Landing Road)	
Hill	Box Elder	423.354	681.322	S-448 east	
Hill		434.741	699.648	S-334 south – Rocky Boy's Agency	
Hill	West Havre	444.376	715.154	US 2 – Shelby, Havre	US 87 northern terminus
1.000 mi = 1.609 km; 1.000 km = 0.621 mi: Concurrency terminus

== Related routes ==
- U.S. Route 87 Bypass (Great Falls, Montana)
- U.S. Route 87 Bypass (Lewistown, Montana)
- Montana Secondary Highway 451

== See also ==
U.S. Route 87
Previous state: Wyoming	Montana	Next state: Terminus
