= Duck Lake (Montana) =

- Location within Montana
- Location: Glacier County, Montana, United States
- Coordinates: 48°52′08″N 113°20′02″W
- Type: Lake
- Max. length: 2.9 miles (4.7 km)
- Max. width: 1 mile (1.6 km)
- Surface area: 1,446.5 acres (585.4 ha)
- Surface elevation: 5,026 feet (1,532 m)

Duck Lake is a lake in Glacier County, Montana located four miles (6.4 km) east of the community of Babb, Montana. The lake covers 1,446 acres (585 ha) and is fished for brown, bull and rainbow trout.

== See also ==
- List of lakes in Flathead County, Montana (A-L)
