= Plug-in electric vehicles in Montana =

As of January 2022, there were about 2,900 electric vehicles (including plug-in hybrid vehicles) in Montana, equivalent to 0.18% of all light-duty vehicles in the state.

== Government ==
As of March 2022, the state government charges the same annual registration fees for gasoline-powered and electric vehicles.

== Charging stations ==
As of April 2022, there were 80 public charging stations in Montana.

The Infrastructure Investment and Jobs Act, signed into law in November 2021, allocates US$42.9 million to charging stations in Montana.

As of 2022, the state government plans to build "alternative fuel corridors", with charging stations located at least every 50 miles (80 km), along I-15, I-90, I-94, US-2, and US-93.

== By region ==
=== Missoula ===
The Missoula and Missoula County governments have requested that the state government designate US-12, MT-83, and MT-200 as alternative fuel corridors, in addition to the existing designated highways.
