= Billings Metropolitan Transit =

Bus system of Billings, Montana

MET Transit System
- Founded: 1973
- Headquarters: 1705 Monad Road
- Locale: Billings, MT
- Service type: bus service, paratransit
- Routes: 14
- Hubs: Downtown Transfer Center & Stewart Park Transfer Center
- Fleet: Weekday Fleet: 15 Saturday Fleet: 7
- Daily ridership: 2,000
- Website: MET Transit

Billings Metropolitan Transit (MET) is the public transit system in Billings, Montana. MET Transit provides fixed-route and paratransit bus service to the City of Billings Monday-Saturday. The MET is the primary mode of transportation for many citizens of the city. Met serves about 2,000 passengers a day. It currently employs around 60 people. All of MET's buses are accessible by citizens who use wheelchairs and other mobility devices; the buses are wheelchair lift-equipped and accessible to all citizens that are unable to use the stairs. All MET buses are equipped with bike racks for its bike riding passengers. Google has MET routes attached to its trip planner, and 3rd party mobile applications are now available for the iPhone and other platforms.

== History ==
MET Transit began operation in 1973 with only five fixed routes; these included Crosstown, Grand, Broadwater, Central, and Southside. In 1993, MET opened up its first transfer center at Stewart Park for passengers to utilize in transferring to connection buses. In July 1996, the MET started the "Bike and Ride" program in an attempt to attract new riders; by 2004, the program had 1,411 bike-and-ride users. In 2002, the MET added its S.S. Loop to the fleet list adding extra service to the Billings south side and Route 11M Northwest was dropped off the MET route fleet. In 2003, the MET remodeled its Stewart Park Transfer Center. In the summer of 2008, construction began on the new Downtown transfer center at 220 N. 25th Street; this was completed in early 2009 and it was open for business. This resulted in various changes to the routes and schedules for the buses that transfer in Downtown. Further, the MET raised its fare prices from $0.75 to $1.25 and from $0.25 to $0.50. In 2011 the MET once again faced a schedule change; Route 12P Overland Avenue was taken off the fleet.

In 2013, MET faced another schedule change but added more service to the West-End and the South Side. The new "West-End" bus (originally called "Southwest" and running every half-hour) was changed into a one-hour route that extended to cover the V.A. Clinic on Spring Creek Drive and Zoo Montana on Shiloh Road and Pierce Parkway. The route was directed down Shiloh to Shiloh Crossing, a shopping center on Shiloh Road and King Avenue West. Routes 1M, 5D, 9D, 10D, S5, and S9 also faced changes. Route 1M changed by adding an hour and a half of service each weekday and further service down 6th Ave N. Route 5D is now known as Route 5D1 Grand 1 and Route 5D2 Grand 2. The new Grand routes run to 32nd St W off of Grand Ave instead of to 28th St W. Route 9D Central has been changed to travel down 1st Ave S during its Outbound times. Route 10D Southside serves 4th Ave S on its outbound times.

In 2014, the MET began a new program for disabled veterans. Disabled veterans can ride free on all the MET bus routes as long as the individuals show the MET driver their Department of Veterans Affairs identification card indicating "Service Connected"; the vet is not required to have a bus pass.

Also in 2014, the MET will provide its first shuttle service to the Magic Blues Fest at South Park. Service will run from 14:00-23:00 and the bus will run 4 times an hour.

In May 2016, the City Council approved a four-year phased-in approach to increase bus fares. The monthly bus passes will increase by $4 beginning July 1, 2016 for the first year. Each year thereafter on July 1; the monthly passes will increase by $2 until July 1, 2019. The overall increase for adult, youth, senior, and disabled monthly passes will have an accumulative increase of $10 by fiscal year 2020.

Cash fares also increased on July 1, 2016. Adult cash fares went up from $1.25 to $1.75, Youth from $1.25 to $1.50, and the Senior/Disabled cash fare from $0.50 to $0.85. Day Passes are $4.00. Under 6 ride for free with fare-paying rider, limit 3. And, transfers are free per use upon paying a cash fare; good for 90 minutes of being issued.

Additionally at the May 23, 2016 City Council meeting, the Council approved the elimination of four unproductive routes. The eliminated routes are the 2 Rimrock, 4 Parkhill, 6 Lewis, and 8 Miles and will end service on July 30.

In July 2018, the MET made changes to Route 1-MET Link having it travel to Billings Logan International Airport for the first time and Route 13-Westend travel to St. Josephine Crossing allowing transfers between routes 13-Westend and 19-The Loop at Midland and Mullowney. In October, 2018 bus tracking technology was made available to the public through the Double Map bus tracking app.

In February 2020 MET added free public WiFi to all its buses.

In November 2020, MET added the ability to pay using a digital fare system, Umo, and added bus pass smart cards and the Umo app. Cash is still accepted on all buses.

On October 2, 2023, MET had a complete fixed-route overhaul, and changed all existing routes and eliminating tripper routes. The system transitioned from a flag-stop system to a designated bus stop system and added 30-minute service across most of the City of Billings, and a 15-minute Downtown Circulator route. A new real-time bus tracking app, Passio Go!, allows passengers to track the bus in real time.

== Services ==
The MET serves all five wards in the city of Billings with easily blue identifiable buses. The route name is displayed over the windshield and side window while the route number is also displayed in the windshield's lower left corner. The MET stops at most corners or at blue and green MET bus signs. However, over the next 12-18 months, MET Transit will only stop at designated bus stops.

=== Weekday routes ===
- 1 - Downtown Circulator
- 3 - Crosstown
- 5 - Grand
- 7 - Broadwater
- 9 - Central South
- 10 - Southside
- 13 - King Ave West
- 16 - Heights to Downtown
- 18 - Heights East and West
- 19 - Midtown
- 21 - North Westend
- 23 - South Westend

=== Saturday Routes ===
- S3 - Crosstown
- S5 - Grand
- S9 - Central
- S13 - King Ave West
- S16 - Heights to Downtown
- S18 - Heights East and West

== Met Plus ==
MET Plus provides paratransit service to citizens who are unable to use MET Transit's fixed route bus service due to a disability. Paratransit is an Origin to Destination service for persons certified as eligible. All MET Transit vehicles are lift-equipped.

== Facilities & Vehicles ==
=== Head Office ===
The head office known as The Metroplex houses the administration offices, maintenance, buses, and bus wash.

Address: 1705 Monad Road
Coordinates: 45°45′47″N 108°33′31″W

=== Downtown Transfer Center ===
Most MET routes, except Route 13, come together in downtown Billings at the transfer center at 220 N. 25th Street.

Address: 220 North 25th Street
Coordinates: 45°47′06″N 108°30′12.8″W

=== Stewart Park Transfer Center ===
All routes come together at the Stewart Park Transfer Center just west of Rimrock Mall except the #1 - Downtown Circulator.

Address: Stewart Park Road at Rimrock Mall
Coordinates: 45°46′04.4″N 108°34′55.8″W

=== Transit Fleet ===
MET Transit has a fleet of 40 vehicles - 25 for fixed-route and 15 used for Paratransit.

- 17 Eldorado EZ-Rider II 32 ft. Standard Diesel High-FloorBuses 1826-1842
- 2 Gillig 35 ft. Standard Diesel Low-Floor Buses 1818 and 1819
- 6 Ford-LF Trans Heavy Duty buses 1820-1825

In August 2022, Billings MET Transit announced plans to buy four electric buses with funds awarded by a grant program, which totaled $3,880,316.

== See also ==
- Transportation in Montana
