= Mountain Line (Montana) =

Public transit service in Missoula, Montana, United States

- Founded: 1976
- Headquarters: Missoula, Montana
- Service area: Missoula, Montana
- Service type: Bus service, paratransit
- Routes: 13
- Daily ridership: 4,500 (weekdays, Q2 2025)
- Annual ridership: 1,337,400 (2024)
- Fuel type: Biodiesel
- Operator: Missoula Urban Transportation District
- Website: mountainline.com

Mountain Line is a public transit system providing service to the community of Missoula, Montana and the University of Montana. The legal name of Mountain Line is the Missoula Urban Transportation District, which is governed by a board whose members are appointed by the City of Missoula and Missoula County. In 2024, the system had a ridership of 1,337,400, or about 4,500 per weekday as of the second quarter of 2025.

== History ==
The Missoula Urban Transportation District (MUTD) was established via a ballot measure in June 1976. The MUTD formed the Mountain Line and began operating buses in December 1977.

On January 5, 2015, the Mountain Line began a three-year demonstration project that provided free bus service to all passengers. The project costs $460,000 annually and is funded by the city of Missoula, the University of Montana, and 12 other community partners. By the end of the year, the service saw a 38 percent increase in ridership, with 300,000 additional passengers.

In 2021, Mountain Line was named the top public transit agency in the United States and Canada, winning the Outstanding Public Transportation System Achievement Award by the American Public Transportation Association (APTA).

== Services ==
Mountain Line operates 12 fixed routes on weekdays, 11 of which also operate on Saturdays and 10 on Sundays. There is no service on 4 major holidays: New Years Day (Jan 1st), Fourth of July, Thanksgiving, and Christmas. Mountain Line operates on a Sunday schedule during other federal holidays. 15-minute frequent transit service is available on the Bolt! Route while most other routes operate on 30- or 60-minute schedules. During the Saturdays in the summer, Mountain Line also operates a trolley to two farmers' markets and a craft market in downtown Missoula. Additionally, Mountain Line operates a trolley to "Out to Lunch," an outdoor concert series on Wednesdays during the summer. Paratransit service is provided for people with disabilities who are unable to ride fixed-route buses.

=== Route list ===
- Bolt! 1 Downtown / University / Community Hospital
- Bolt! 2 Target Plaza / Southgate Mall
- Route 3 Northside
- Route 4 East Broadway Park and Ride / East Missoula / Bonner
- Route 5 Rattlesnake
- Route 6 Higgins / Dornblaser / Opportunity Resources / Southgate Mall
- Route 7 Downtown / Southgate Mall
- Route 8 Adams Center / 5th / 6th / Southgate Mall
- Route 9 Good Food Store / Target Range / Community Hospital
- Route 11 N Reserve St / Expressway / Airport
- Route 12 Downtown / University / Dornblaser / South Hills
- Route 14 Broadway / Russell

== Facilities ==
=== Head office ===
Address: 1221 Shakespeare Street, Missoula
Coordinates: 46°53′02″N 114°00′36″W
Facilities: Head office, administration, bus storage and maintenance
Opened: 1980

=== Transfer center ===
Address: 200 West Pine Street, Missoula
Coordinates: 46°52′25.8″N 113°59′42.2″W
Facilities: Transfer point, waiting area, restrooms
Opened: 2000

=== Park-and-ride lots ===
Lewis and Clark (Route 12)
Coordinates: 46°50′43.12″N 113°59′50.00″W
Dornblaser (Routes 1, 6, 12)
Coordinates: 46°50′54.05″N 113°59′50.13″W
