= Piegan–Carway Border Crossing =

Border crossing between Canada and the United States

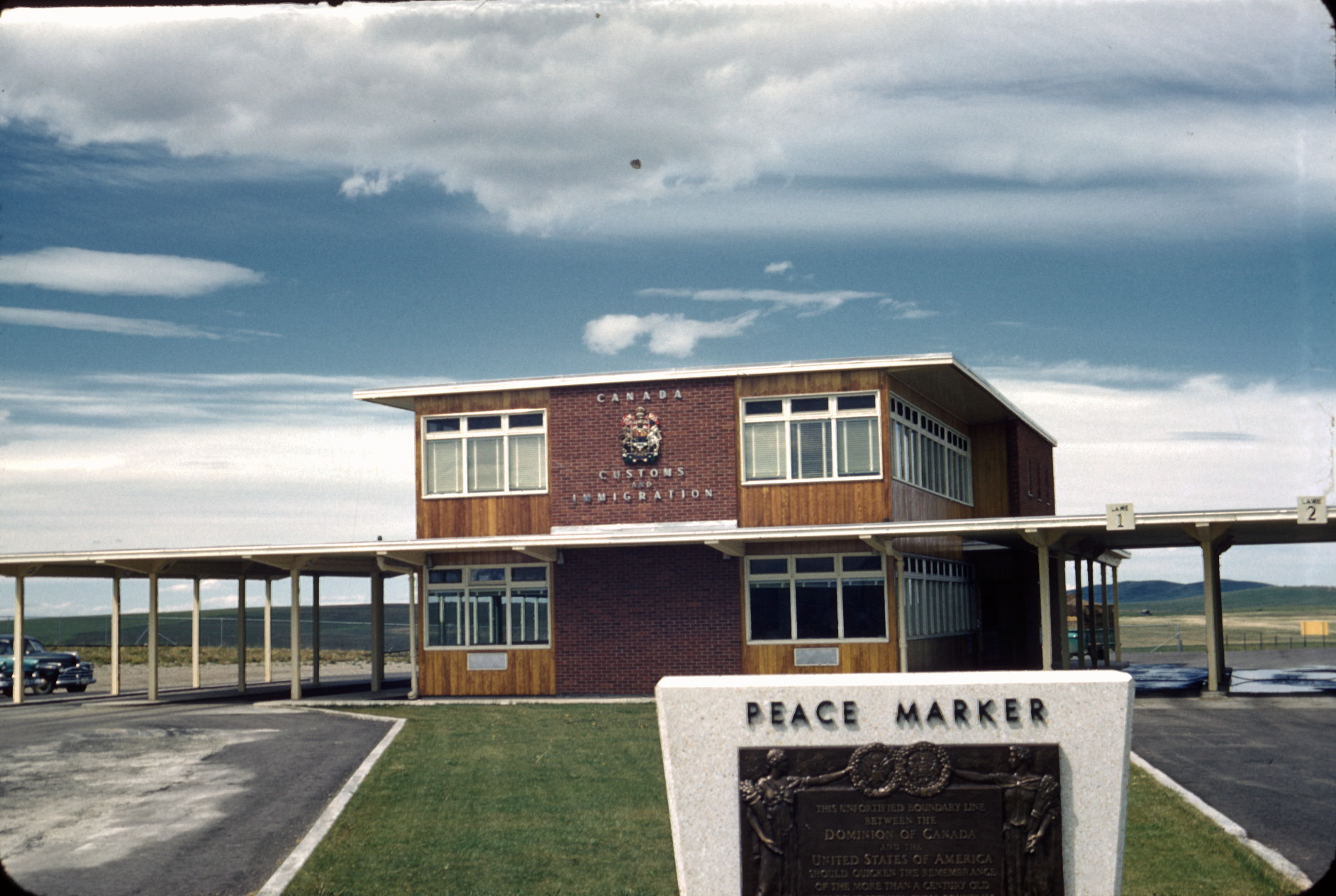
- Canada Border Inspection Station at Carway, AB, 1959

Locaiton
- Country: United States; Canada
- Location: US 89 / Highway 2; US Port: 5023 Highway 89 North, Babb, Montana 59411; Canadian Port: Highway #2 South, Cardston, Alberta T0K 0K0
- Coordinates: 48°59′53″N 113°22′44″W

Details
- Opened: 1926

Website
- US Canadian

The Piegan–Carway Border Crossing connects the towns of Babb, Montana, and Cardston, Alberta, on the Canada–United States border. U.S. Route 89 on the American side joins Alberta Highway 2 on the Canadian side.

== Canadian side ==
The earliest customs service in the region began around 5 kilometres (3 mi) eastward at St. Mary's Crossing on the Saint Mary River in 1883, where the North-West Mounted Police (NWMP) collected duties and patrolled the border. St. Mary's closed in 1901. At that time, the Cardston customs postal collecting station upgraded to a customs office, operating from 1901 until 1943. In 1904, the St. Mary's NWMP moved to Twin Lakes (present day Police Outpost Provincial Park, about 6 kilometres (4 mi) westward). Based about one mile north of border, the NWMP collected duties until a regular customs office opened, which operated from 1912 until 1932.

The Carway crossing was established in 1926 with the completion of the Cardston Highway. Canada Customs officer Herbert Legg created the name by combining the words Cardston and Highway. Prior to the erection of the building, a tent was used for four months. William Roberts was the inaugural customs officer from 1926 until 1938. The Port of Lethbridge provided administrative oversight.

The customs building was replaced in 1954.

In 1994, the border station hours were extended to match the 7am–11pm on the US side.

== US side ==
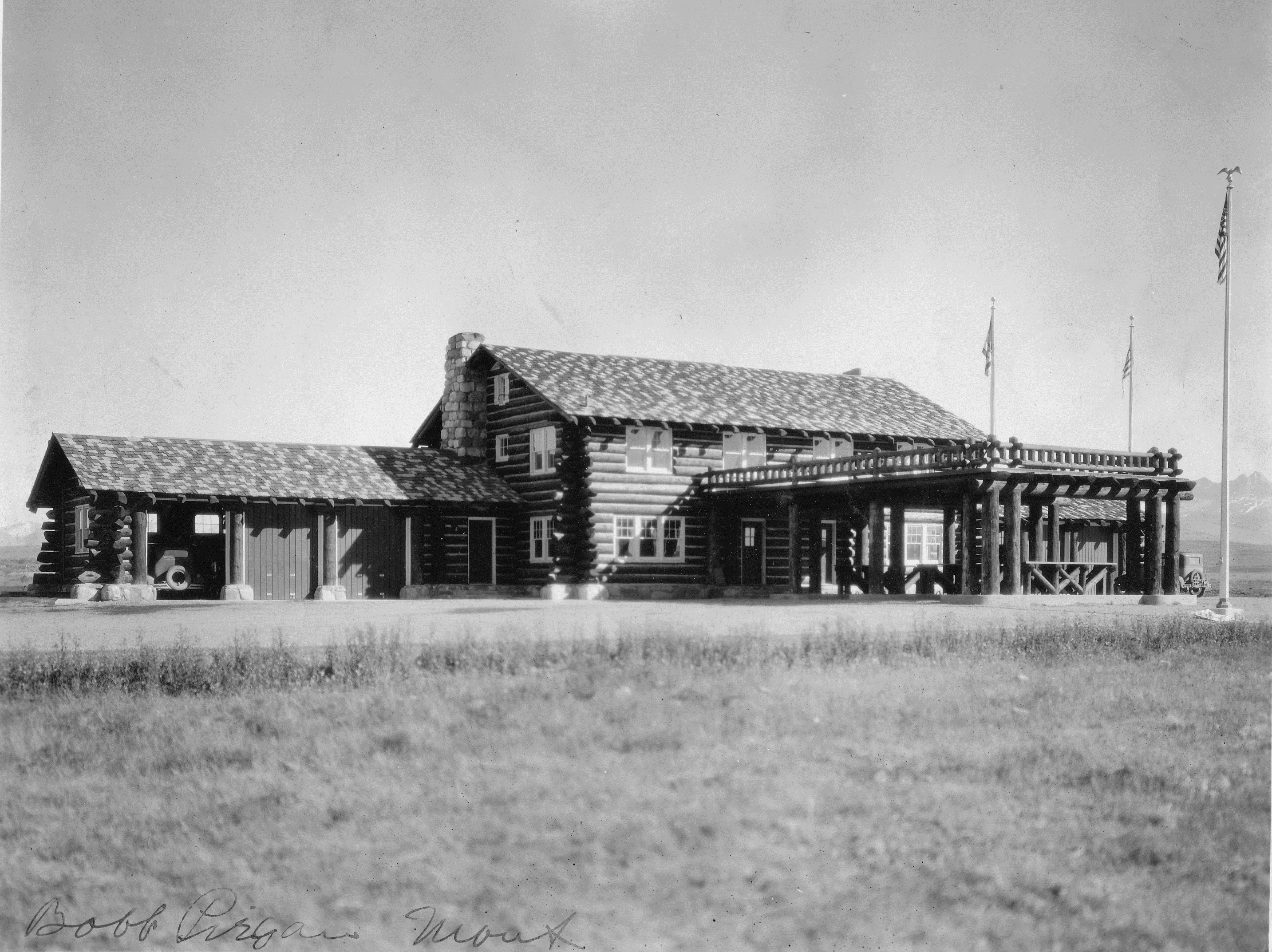
US Border Station at Piegan MT, 1933

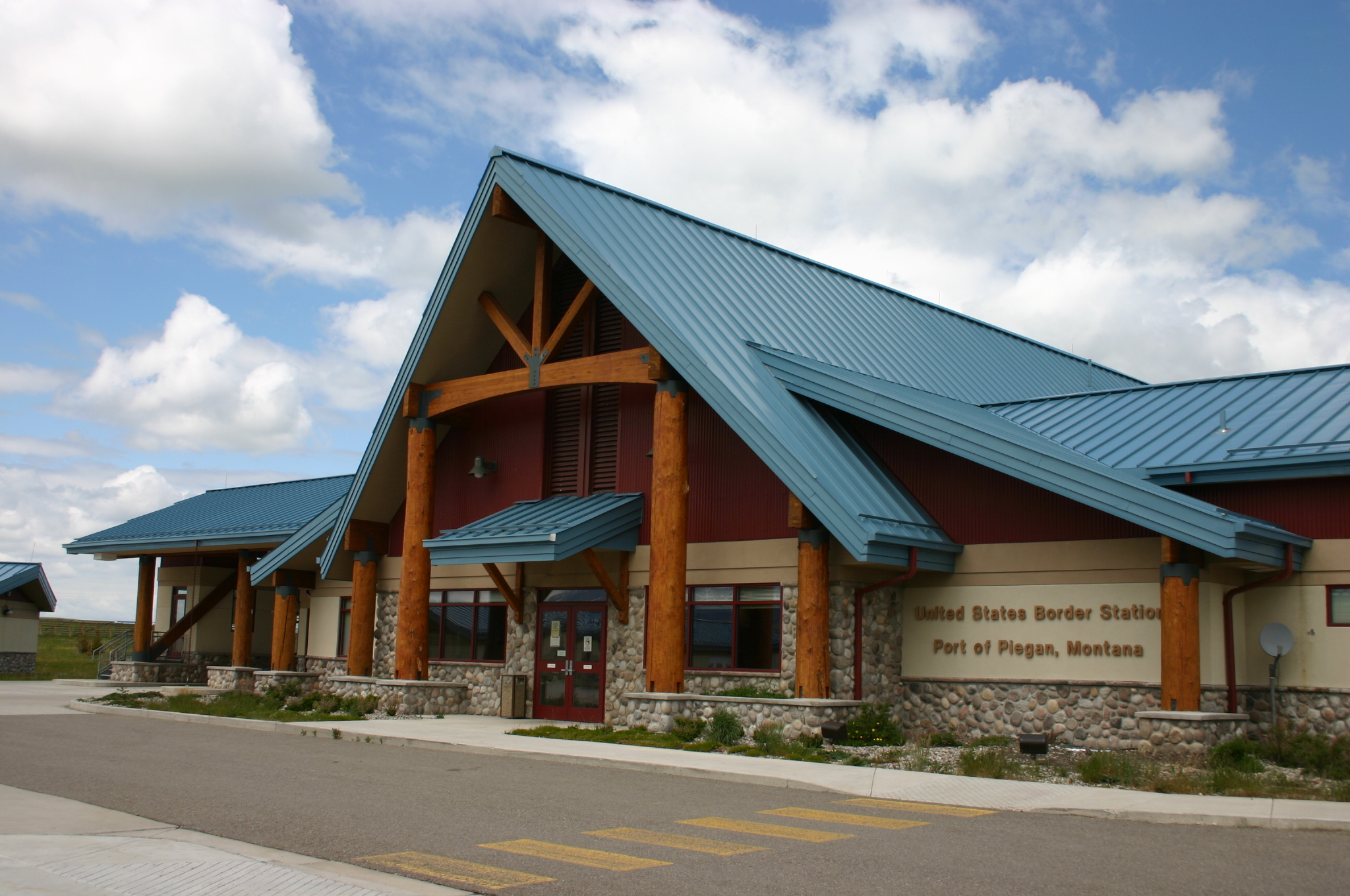
US Border Inspection Station at Piegan, MT, 2004

The customs station opened in 1926.

A station operated in Browning from 1934 until 1946.

The highway connects Calgary with Waterton-Glacier International Peace Park. This crossing is the third-busiest in Montana. Twenty homes for US border officials are near the station. In 1933, the US built a log cabin-style border station, which is on the National Register of Historic Places. The US built a new facility in 2003, but the historic border station still stands a short distance to the south.

== See also ==
- List of Canada–United States border crossings
