= Neihart, Montana =

- Town
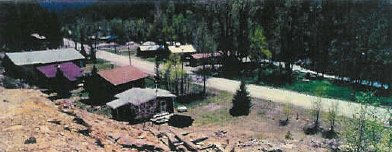
- Neihart

- Location of Neihart, Montana
- Coordinates: 46°56′30″N 110°45′05″W
- Country: United States
- State: Montana
- County: Cascade

Area
  - Total: 1.99 sq mi (5.15 km^{2})
  - Land: 1.99 sq mi (5.15 km^{2})
  - Water: 0 sq mi (0.00 km^{2})
- Elevation: 5,709 ft (1,740 m)

Population (2020)
  - Total: 43
  - Density: 21.6/sq mi (8.35/km^{2})
- Time zone: UTC-7 (Mountain (MST))
  - Summer (DST): UTC-6 (MDT)
- ZIP code: 59465
- Area code: 406
- FIPS code: 30-53200
- GNIS feature ID: 2413038

Neihart is a town in Cascade County, Montana, United States. It is located in the center of Little Belt Mountains. The population was 43 at the 2020 census. It is part of the Great Falls, Montana, Metropolitan Statistical Area.

== Geography ==
The town has a total area of 1.99 square miles (5.15 km^{2}), all land. Its elevation is 5,661 feet (1,725 m). Neihart is on U.S. Route 89, also known as the Kings Hill Scenic Byway. Snow removal crews work throughout the winter to keep the road open. It is the only town between Monarch to the north and White Sulphur Springs to the south. The Lewis and Clark National Forest surrounds the town. The ski area at Showdown, Montana is nearby and takes advantage of the mountainous terrain. Just south of Neihart, Route 89 begins to follow Sawmill Creek. The highway then climbs toward King's Hill, a major pass through the Little Belt Mountains.

=== Geology ===
The Neihart area is rich in mineral deposits. Gold, lead, sapphires, silver, and zinc have all been discovered and mined in the area. Much of the exposed rock in the area is dated to the Precambrian era, or around or before 542 million BC. Rocks in the area belong to what is known as the Belt Supergroup and rest against granitic gneiss. Amethyst and marine fossils are common in the area. Pinto diorite, a red-and-green spotted diorite, is found in large quantities in the area.

The area is one of only three places in the world where Neihart quartzite (a reddish, coarse-grained sandstone with interbedded dark-green sandstone and shale) may be found. The rock unit was named for the locality.

=== Climate ===
According to the Köppen Climate Classification system, Neihart has a semi-arid climate, abbreviated "BSk" on climate maps.

Climate data for Neihart, Montana, 1991–2020 normals, extremes 1967–2008
Month	Jan	Feb	Mar	Apr	May	Jun	Jul	Aug	Sep	Oct	Nov	Dec	Year
Record high °F (°C)	67 (19)	64 (18)	71 (22)	82 (28)	86 (30)	96 (36)	97 (36)	97 (36)	93 (34)	89 (32)	73 (23)	60 (16)	97 (36)
Mean daily maximum °F (°C)	37.1 (2.8)	39.6 (4.2)	46.5 (8.1)	54.4 (12.4)	63.2 (17.3)	71.4 (21.9)	81.2 (27.3)	81.3 (27.4)	72.0 (22.2)	57.7 (14.3)	44.0 (6.7)	36.8 (2.7)	57.1 (13.9)
Daily mean °F (°C)	26.6 (−3.0)	27.7 (−2.4)	34.1 (1.2)	40.9 (4.9)	49.0 (9.4)	56.6 (13.7)	64.1 (17.8)	64.1 (17.8)	55.9 (13.3)	44.8 (7.1)	33.8 (1.0)	26.4 (−3.1)	43.7 (6.5)
Mean daily minimum °F (°C)	16.2 (−8.8)	15.9 (−8.9)	21.7 (−5.7)	27.3 (−2.6)	34.8 (1.6)	41.8 (5.4)	46.9 (8.3)	46.9 (8.3)	39.8 (4.3)	31.9 (−0.1)	23.6 (−4.7)	16.1 (−8.8)	30.2 (−1.0)
Record low °F (°C)	−39 (−39)	−46 (−43)	−30 (−34)	−19 (−28)	11 (−12)	19 (−7)	28 (−2)	27 (−3)	4 (−16)	−13 (−25)	−26 (−32)	−44 (−42)	−46 (−43)
Average precipitation inches (mm)	0.93 (24)	0.63 (16)	1.56 (40)	2.05 (52)	3.56 (90)	3.68 (93)	2.30 (58)	2.07 (53)	2.00 (51)	1.54 (39)	0.83 (21)	1.02 (26)	22.17 (563)
Average snowfall inches (cm)	14.3 (36)	12.6 (32)	19.0 (48)	14.9 (38)	6.7 (17)	0.4 (1.0)	0.0 (0.0)	trace	3.2 (8.1)	9.6 (24)	10.4 (26)	13.8 (35)	104.9 (265.1)
Average precipitation days (≥ 0.01 in)	6.2	5.2	7.9	8.6	12.1	12.5	9.2	8.9	7.7	6.8	6.1	6.0	97.2
Average snowy days (≥ 0.1 in)	6.0	5.3	6.9	3.7	1.3	0.1	0.0	0.0	0.7	2.9	5.0	6.1	38.0
Source 1: NOAA (precip/precip days, snow/snow days 1981–2010)
Source 2: XMACIS2

== History ==
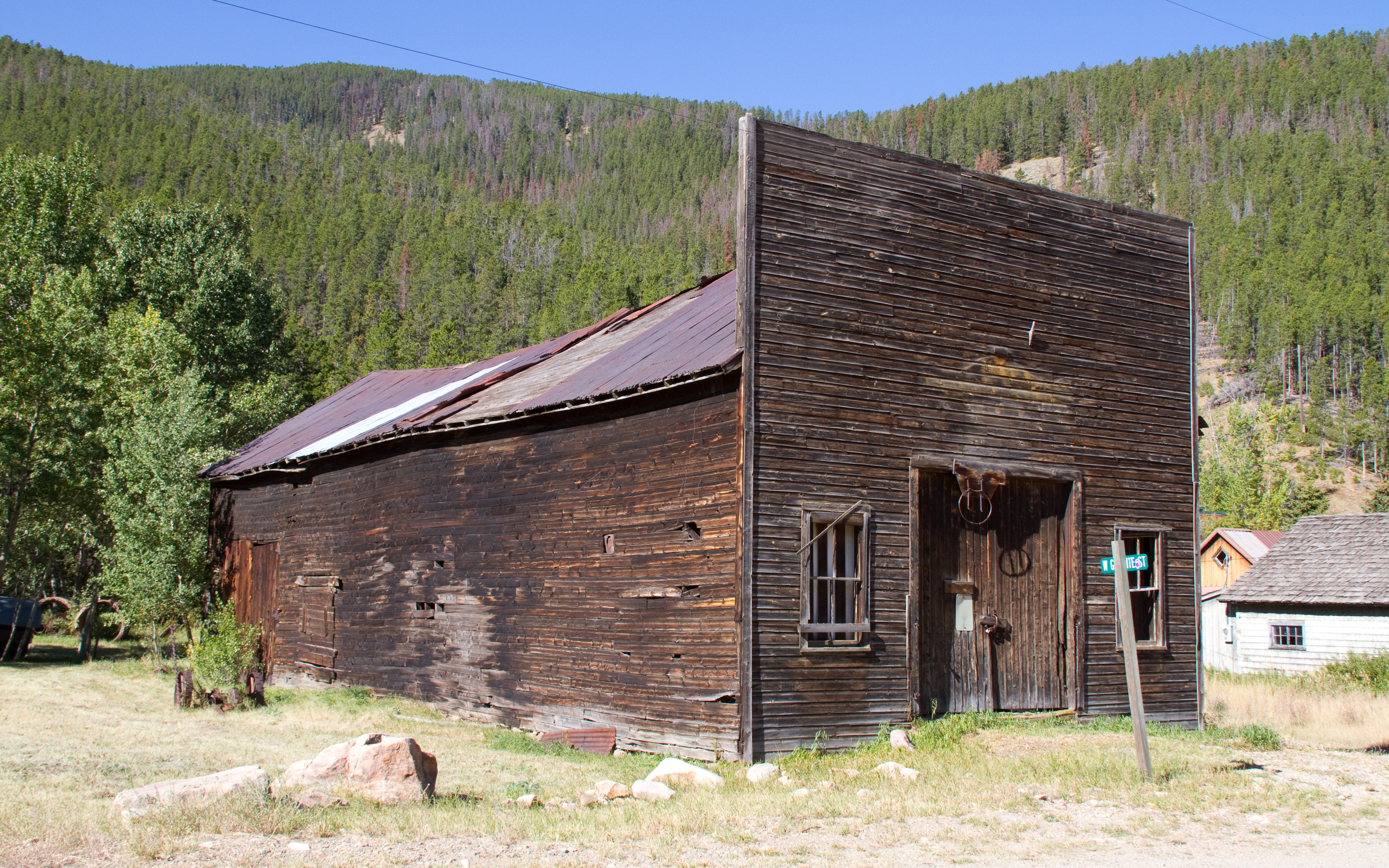
Old building in Neihart

On October 20, 1879, E.A. "Buck" Barker and Patrick Hughes, two prospectors, discovered silver ore on Galena Creek in the Little Belt Mountains. The mining towns of Barker, Galena Creek, and Hughesville soon sprang up in the area. Among the many small mining camps which were erected was Jericho, which soon went bust. In July 1881, three prospectors from Barker—James LeRoy Neihart, John O'Brien, and Richard Harley—discovered silver near the present-day town of Neihart and established the Queen of the Mountains Mine. When the news reached Barker, several parties of prospectors headed for the area and established a new mining camp on Belt Creek named Canyon City. Canyon City was later renamed Neihart after the aforementioned James LeRoy Neihart, who was also an uncle of poet John Neihardt. The mining district was never formally organized, but for many years was called the "Montana District". More than 40 mines operated in the area over the next 75 years.

In 1882, the town was large enough for the United States Post Office Department to establish a post office there. A road to White Sulphur Springs was constructed shortly thereafter, although ore was packed out by mule to Barker and smelted there. When the Barker smelter closed in 1883, a new smelter was built close to Neihart at the Mountain Chief Mine in 1885. By this time, the town featured a blacksmith's shop, a boarding house, restaurants, two saloons, and stables. About 50 houses had been built in Neihart, although many residents still lived in tents. From 1882 to 1929, about $16 million in silver was taken out of the area around Neihart. The Galt and Broadwater mines were dug in 1883, and a year later the Ball and Mountain Chief mines were in operation. The M and I, Rochester, and Silver Dyke mines also opened near Neihart. Despite the area's rich ore deposits, investment in mining in the Neihart region remained low due to the expense of ore extraction. In 1887, these early mines largely shut down, as most of the richest and easily accessible veins of ore had been exhausted. By 1890, Neihart was almost deserted.

On November 15, 1891, a spur of the Montana Central Railway reached Neihart, and a strong mining boom began. Now even low-grade ore could be easily and cheaply shipped to the huge smelter in Great Falls. The Panic of 1893 wiped out the area's mining economy, but the town continued to exist. This was largely because some mines, such as the Benton, Big Seven, and Florence, continued in operation.

Neihart went through a series of booms and busts over the next half-century. Mining booms occurred during and after World War I, in 1929, and in 1935. The 1935 boom was built primarily around zinc mining, and Neihart continued to be a major source for zinc during World War II. In 1939, the town's population was 168. After World War II, the rail spur was abandoned and the track removed.

Portions of Neihart have been abandoned, and ghost town ruins can be seen in the city's outer limits, among them being Wu Tang's former laundry and drug store. The remains of Jericho can also still be found in Neihart.

== Demographics ==
Historical population
Census	Pop.	Note	%±
1900	833		—
1910	268		−67.8%
1920	749		179.5%
1930	169		−77.4%
1940	466		175.7%
1950	289		−38.0%
1960	150		−48.1%
1970	109		−27.3%
1980	91		−16.5%
1990	53		−41.8%
2000	91		71.7%
2010	51		−44.0%
2020	43		−15.7%
U.S. Decennial Census

=== 2010 census ===
As of the census of 2010, there were 51 people, 32 households, and 17 families residing in the town. The population density was 25.6 inhabitants per square mile (9.9/km^{2}). There were 170 housing units at an average density of 85.4 per square mile (33.0/km^{2}). The racial makeup of the town was 92.2% White, 3.9% Native American, and 3.9% from two or more races.

There were 32 households, of which 3.1% had children under the age of 18 living with them, 53.1% were married couples living together, and 46.9% were non-families. 43.8% of all households were made up of individuals, and 31.3% had someone living alone who was 65 years of age or older. The average household size was 1.59 and the average family size was 2.06.

The median age in the town was 68.2 years. 2% of residents were under the age of 18; 3.9% were between the ages of 18 and 24; 5.9% were from 25 to 44; 31.4% were from 45 to 64; and 56.9% were 65 years of age or older. The gender makeup of the town was 54.9% male and 45.1% female.

=== 2000 census ===
As of the census of 2000, there were 91 people, 44 households, and 27 families residing in the town. The population density was 45.8 inhabitants per square mile (17.7/km^{2}). There were 164 housing units at an average density of 82.5 per square mile (31.9/km^{2}). The racial makeup of the town was 93.41% White, 1.10% Native American, 1.10% from other races, and 4.40% from two or more races. Hispanic or Latino of any race were 1.10% of the population.

There were 44 households, out of which 15.9% had children under the age of 18 living with them, 54.5% were married couples living together, 2.3% had a female householder with no husband present, and 36.4% were non-families. 29.5% of all households were made up of individuals, and 15.9% had someone living alone who was 65 years of age or older. The average household size was 2.07 and the average family size was 2.36.

In the town, the population was spread out, with 17.6% under the age of 18, 19.8% from 25 to 44, 30.8% from 45 to 64, and 31.9% who were 65 years of age or older. The median age was 54 years. For every 100 females there were 152.8 males. For every 100 females age 18 and over, there were 167.9 males.

The median income for a household in the town was $21,458, and the median income for a family was $25,625. Males had a median income of $11,250 versus $18,750 for females. The per capita income for the town was $20,266. There were 20.7% of families and 21.7% of the population living below the poverty line, including 20.0% of under eighteens and none of those over 64.

== Government ==
Royal Westervelt, the incumbent mayor, was unopposed in 2025.

== Bibliography ==
- Aarstad, Rich; Arguimbau, Ellen; Baumler, Ellen; Porsild, Charlene L.; and Shovers, Brian. Montana Place Names From Alzada to Zortman. Helena, Mont.: Montana Historical Society Press, 2009.
- Federal Writers' Project. Montana: A State Guide Book. New York: Hastings House, 1939.
- Miller, Donald C. Ghost Towns of Montana: A Classic Tour Through the Treasure State's Historic Sites. Guilford, Conn.: Two Dot, 2008.
- Enzel, Robert G. The White Book of Ski Areas. Washington, D.C.: Inter-Ski Services, 1998.
- Fifer, Barbara. Montana Mining Ghost Towns. Helena, Mont.: Farcountry Press, 2002.
- Rankama, Kalervo. The Geologic Systems: The Precambrian. New York: Interscience Publishers, 1963.
- Soderberg, Vicky and Soderberg, Ken. The Best in Tent Camping: Montana. Birmingham, Ala.: Menasha Ridge Press, 2005.
- Weed, Walter Harvey. Geology of the Little Belt Mountains, Montana, With Notes on the Mineral Deposits of the Neihart, Barker, Yogo, and Other Districts. Washington, D.C.: Government Printing Office, 1900.
