= U.S. Route 12 in Montana =

U.S. Highway in Montana

U.S. Highway 12
- Lewis and Clark Highway
- US 12 highlighted in red

Route information
- Maintained by MDT
- Length: 597.576 mi (961.705 km)
- Existed: 1926–present
- Tourist routes: Lewis and Clark Trail

Major junctions
- West end: US 12 at the Idaho state line at Lolo Pass
- US 93 from Lolo to Missoula; I-90 from Missoula to Garrison; MT 200 from Missoula to West Riverside; I-15 in Helena; US 287 from Helena to Townsend; US 89 near White Sulphur Springs; US 191 in Harlowton; US 87 in Roundup; I-94 from Forsyth to Miles City
- East end: US 12 at the North Dakota state line east of Baker

Location
- Country: United States
- State: Montana
- Counties: Missoula, Granite, Powell, Lewis and Clark, Jefferson, Broadwater, Meagher, Wheatland, Golden Valley, Musselshell, Rosebud, Custer, Fallon

Highway system
- United States Numbered Highway System; List; Special; Divided; Montana Highway System; Interstate; US; State; Secondary
← MT 7	→ MT 13

U.S. Highway 12 (US 12) is an east–west United States Numbered Highway in the state of Montana. It extends approximately 597.576 miles (961.705 km) from the Idaho state line east to the North Dakota state line, the greatest distance that US 12 traverses through any state.

US 12 in Montana has been defined as the Lewis and Clark Highway despite not being the route followed by Lewis and Clark across the state.

== Route description ==
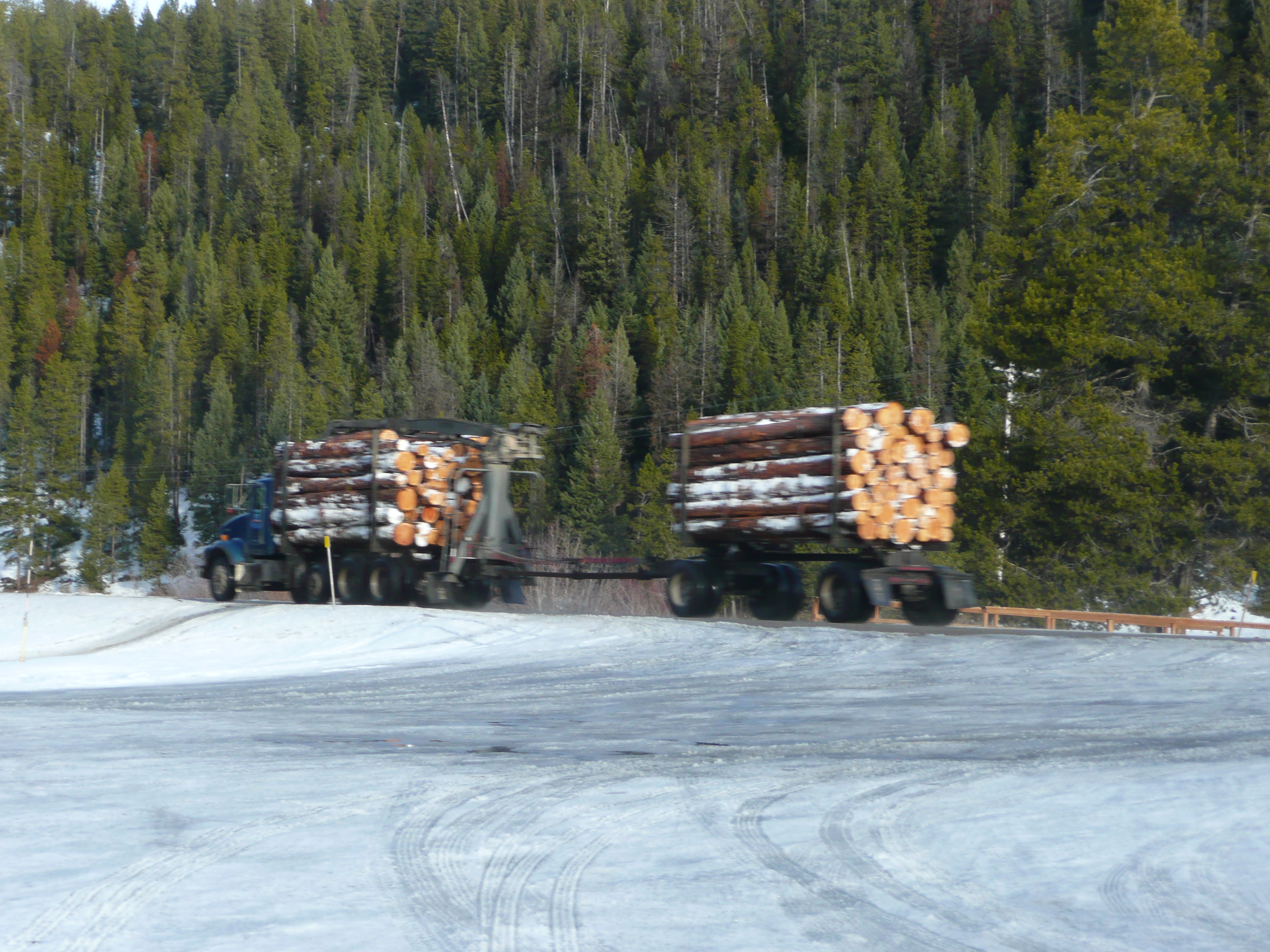
Logging truck at Lolo Hot Springs

US 12 enters Montana at Lolo Pass, seven miles (11 km) southwest of Lolo Hot Springs in Lolo National Forest. After passing Lolo Peak to the south and traveling east for 33 miles (53 km), it meets with US 93 at Lolo and continues running concurrently northeast for 7.5 miles (12.1 km), where US 93 heads due north on Reserve Street, toward Kalispell and Glacier National Park. US 12 continues northeasterly through Missoula's downtown, eventually meeting Interstate 90 (I-90). It then overlaps I-90 for 69 miles (111 km), until Garrison, where it heads eastward toward Helena for 48.8 miles (78.5 km). This two-lane section of the trip passes through Avon and Elliston winding through Helena National Forest, over the Continental Divide at MacDonald Pass, and then through Montana's capital city, Helena.

On the east end of Helena, US 12 passes over I-15 at which point it joins US 287 south. US 12 overlaps US 287 and heads southeasterly, toward Townsend for 33.4 miles (53.8 km), where it splits from US 287, which heads south toward the intersection of I-90 near the town of Three Forks. US 12 heads eastward toward White Sulphur Springs for 42.2 miles (67.9 km); the route joins US 89 (which heads south toward Livingston and Yellowstone National Park) for 8.4 miles (13.5 km) before entering White Sulphur Springs and for another three miles (4.8 km) east of town. US 12 continues east for 54.4 miles (87.5 km) to Harlowton where it joins US 191 and share a 1.4-mile (2.3 km) concurrency through town. On the east end of Harlowton, the routes meet with Montana Highway 3 (MT 3), where US 191 and MT 3 share a common alignment and continue north to Lewistown and MT 3 joins US 12. US 12 and MT 3 continue east for 45.2 miles (72.7 km) before MT 3 heads south near Lavina and continues to Billings. US 12 continues east 21.4 miles (34.4 km) until the junction of US 87 and the two routes continue as a 2.1-mile (3.4 km) concurrency through Roundup. US 87 splits north and US 12 continues east on its own for 101 miles (163 km), until the junction with I-94 at Forsyth as a concurrency northeast for 45.8 miles (73.7 km) to Miles City. At the east exit for Miles City, US 12 splits again from I-94 and heads almost directly east to the North Dakota border at a distance of 92.4 miles (148.7 km).

== History ==
US 12 had a proposal to be routed southwestward from Miles City through Forsyth, Hysham, Billings, Laurel, Rockvale, Red Lodge, and Cooke City, partially on the path of US 212. This path would have also taken the highway into Wyoming, with a second piece in Montana.

== Major intersections ==
County	Location	mi	km	Exit	Destinations	Notes
Lolo Pass		0.000	0.000		US 12 west / Lewis and Clark Trail / Nez Perce Trail / Northwest Passage Scenic Byway – Lewiston	Continuation into Idaho
Missoula	Lolo	32.556	52.394		US 93 south / Lewis and Clark Trail / Nez Perce Trail – Hamilton	Western end of US 93 concurrency
Missoula	Missoula	40.080	64.503		US 93 north (South Reserve Street) to I-90 – Kalispell US 93 Bus. begins	Eastern end of US 93 concurrency; western terminus of US 93 Bus.; western end of US 93 Bus. concurrency
Missoula	Missoula	41.745	67.182		US 93 Bus. north (Stephens Avenue)	Eastern end of US 93 Bus. concurrency
Missoula	Missoula	42.871	68.994		US 12 Bus. east (Higgens Avenue)	
Missoula	Missoula	43.806	70.499		I-90 BL west / US 12 Bus. west (Broadway Street)	Western end of I-90 BL concurrency
Missoula	Missoula	44.159	71.067	105	I-90 west / MT 200 west / I-90 BL ends – Coeur d'Alene	Eastern end of I-90 BL concurrency; I-90 BL eastern terminus; western end of I-90 / MT 200 concurrency; exit numbers follow I-90
Missoula	Missoula	45.784	73.682	107	East Missoula	
Missoula	Bonner	48.999	78.856	109	MT 200 east / Lewis and Clark Trail – Bonner, Great Falls	Eastern end of MT 200 concurrency
Missoula	Turah	52.884	85.109	113	Turah	
Missoula	Clinton	59.788	96.219	120	Clinton	
Missoula		64.840	104.350	126	Rock Creek Road	Rock Creek Road Scenic Byway
Missoula		69.228	111.412	130	Beavertail Road	
Granite		76.889	123.741	138	Bearmouth Area	
Granite	Drummond	92.167	148.328	153	MT 1 – Drummond, Philipsburg	Eastbound exit and westbound entrance
Granite	Drummond	93.092	149.817	154	To MT 1 – Drummond, Philipsburg	Westbound exit and eastbound entrance
Powell	Jens	101.002	162.547	162	Jens	
Powell	Gold Creek	104.725	168.539	166	Gold Creek	
Powell	Phosphate	108.692	174.923	170	Phosphate	
Powell	Garrison	112.836	181.592	174	I-90 east – Butte	Eastern end of I-90 concurrency; eastbound exit and westbound entrance; westbound exit and eastbound entrance via exit 175
Powell		125.743	202.364		MT 141 north – Helmville	
Powell–Lewis and Clark county line		140.337	225.851		MacDonald Pass (Continental Divide)	
Lewis and Clark	Helena	156.631	252.073		I-15 BL north (North Montana Avenue)	Western end of I-15 BL concurrency
Lewis and Clark	Helena	158.241	254.664		I-15 / US 287 north / I-15 BL ends / Lewis and Clark Trail – Great Falls, Butte	I-15 exit 192; I-15 BL southern terminus; eastern end of I-15 BL concurrency; eastern end of I-15 BL; western end of US 287 concurrency
Lewis and Clark	East Helena	162.562	261.618		S-518 south – Montana City	
Jefferson	Louisville	169.468	272.732		S-284 north	
Broadwater	Townsend	190.311	306.276		US 287 south / Lewis and Clark Trail – Three Forks, Bozeman	Eastern end of US 287 concurrency
Broadwater		192.713	310.142		S-284 north	
Meagher		223.562	359.788		US 89 south – Livingston	Western end of US 89 concurrency
Meagher	White Sulphur Springs	232.418	374.041		S-360 west – Fort Logan	
Meagher		235.361	378.777		US 89 north – Great Falls	Eastern end of US 89 concurrency
Meagher		266.380	428.697		S-294 west – Martinsdale	
Wheatland	Harlowton	289.790	466.372		US 191 south – Big Timber	Western end of US 191 concurrency
Wheatland	Harlowton	291.176	468.602		US 191 north / MT 3 north / Nez Perce Trail – Lewistown	Eastern end of US 191 concurrency; western end of MT 3 concurrency
Wheatland	Shawmut	306.435	493.159		S-297 north	
Golden Valley	Ryegate	320.079	515.117		S-238 north / S-300 south	
Golden Valley		336.354	541.309		MT 3 south / Nez Perce Trail – Lavina, Billings	Eastern end of MT 3 concurrency
Golden Valley		352.938	567.999		S-381	
Musselshell		357.720	575.695		US 87 south – Billings	Western end of US 87 concurrency
Musselshell	Roundup	359.788	579.023		US 87 north – Lewistown	Eastern end of US 87 concurrency
Musselshell		382.425	615.453		S-310 south – Musselshell	
Musselshell		396.097	637.456		S-500 north	
Rosebud	Forsyth	461.175	742.189	93	I-94 west – Billings	Western end of I-94 concurrency; exit numbers follow I-94
Rosebud	Forsyth	462.803	744.809	95	Forsyth	
Rosebud		471.584	758.941	103	S-446 (Rosebud Creek Road) / S-447 – Rosebud	
Rosebud		474.700	763.956	106	Butte Creek Road – Rosebud	
Rosebud		485.470	781.288	117	Hathaway	
Custer		493.976	794.977	126	Moon Creek Road	
Custer		496.490	799.023	128	Local Access	
Custer	Miles City	503.235	809.878	135	I-94 BL east – Jordan, Miles City	
Custer	Miles City	506.013	814.349	138	MT 59 – Miles City, Broadus	
Custer		508.880	818.963	141	I-94 east – Bismarck I-94 BL west – Miles City	Eastern end of I-94 concurrency
Fallon		559.863	901.012		S-320 north – Ismay	
Fallon	Plevna	572.578	921.475		S-494 south	
Fallon	Baker	585.139	941.690		MT 7 – Wibaux, Ekalaka	
Fallon		597.576	961.705		US 12 east – Bowman	Continuation into North Dakota
1.000 mi = 1.609 km; 1.000 km = 0.621 mi: Concurrency terminus; Incomplete access

== See also ==
U.S. Route 12
Previous state: Idaho	Montana	Next state: North Dakota
