= Babb, Montana =

Babb
- Unincorporated community Census-designated place
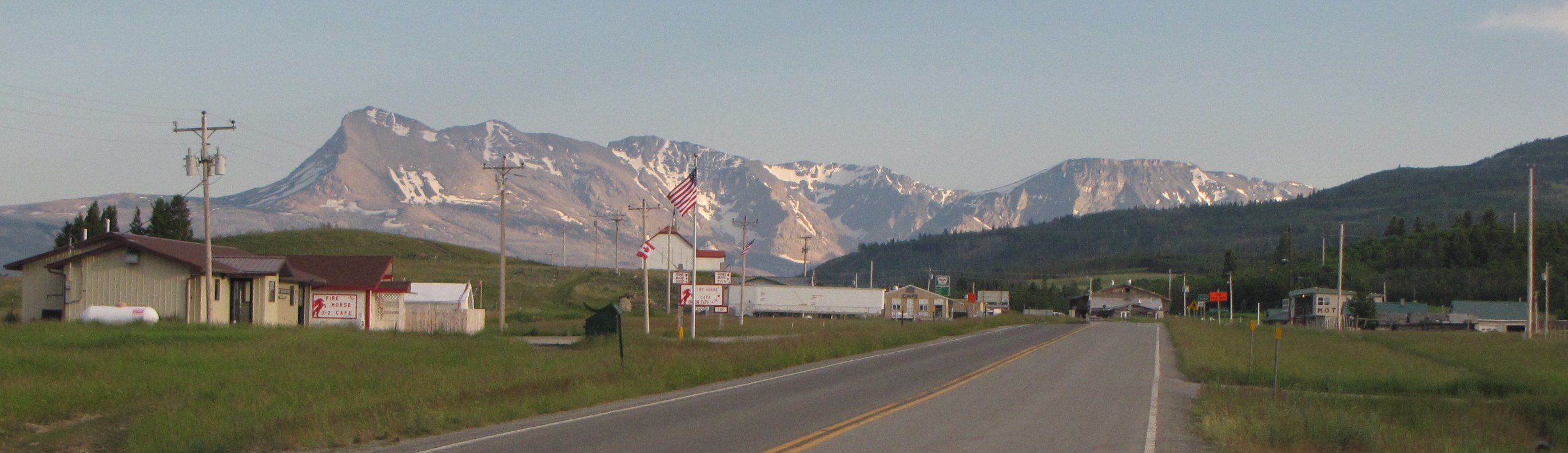
- The mountains of Glacier National Park rising to the west over Babb

- Location within Montana Location within the United States
- Coordinates: 48°52′20″N 113°26′27″W
- Country: United States
- State: Montana
- County: Glacier
- Established: 1905

Area
  - Total: 9.56 sq mi (24.76 km^{2})
  - Land: 9.49 sq mi (24.57 km^{2})
  - Water: 0.073 sq mi (0.19 km^{2})
- Elevation: 4,580 ft (1,400 m)

Population (2020)
  - Total: 130
  - Density: 13.7/sq mi (5.29/km^{2})
- Time zone: UTC-7 (MST)
  - Summer (DST): UTC-6 (MDT)
- ZIP code: 59411
- FIPS code: 30-03250
- GNIS feature ID: 2583786

Babb is an unincorporated farming and ranching community in Glacier County, Montana, United States, on the Blackfeet Indian Reservation. The community experiences a large influx of tourists in the summer months as it is the gateway to the Many Glacier area of Glacier National Park. For statistical purposes, the United States Census Bureau has defined Babb as a census-designated place (CDP). As of the 2020 census, Babb had a population of 130.

Community infrastructure includes one school (Babb Elementary School), a U.S. Post Office, a fire station that houses the Babb/St. Mary Volunteer Fire Department, Thronson's General Store and Motel, several restaurants, two churches, and a gas station. Alcohol is not sold in Babb.

== History ==
Established in 1905 as a post office, the town of Babb was named for Cyrus C. Babb, the engineer in charge of surveying the U.S. Reclamation Service's St. Mary Irrigation Canal. The canal siphoned water from the St. Mary River into the Milk River and was one of the first Bureau of Reclamation projects in the nation.

== Geography ==
Babb is located in northwestern Glacier County in the valley of the St. Mary River. U.S. Route 89 passes through the community, leading north 10 miles (16 km) to the Canadian border at Piegan and south 9 miles (14 km) to St. Mary. Many Glacier Road leads west from Babb 5 miles (8 km) to the border of Glacier National Park at the east end of Lake Sherburne and continues west 7 miles (11 km) to the Many Glacier Hotel.

According to the U.S. Census Bureau, the Babb CDP has a total area of 9.6 square miles (24.8 km^{2}), of which 9.5 square miles (24.6 km^{2}) is land and 0.1 square miles (0.2 km^{2}), or 0.78%, is water.

=== Climate ===
Climate data for Babb, Montana (Elevation: 4,524ft/1,379m)
Month	Jan	Feb	Mar	Apr	May	Jun	Jul	Aug	Sep	Oct	Nov	Dec	Year
Record high °F (°C)	62 (17)	70 (21)	69 (21)	85 (29)	88 (31)	92 (33)	96 (36)	99 (37)	94 (34)	84 (29)	77 (25)	70 (21)	99 (37)
Mean daily maximum °F (°C)	29.8 (−1.2)	34.4 (1.3)	40.1 (4.5)	50.8 (10.4)	60.6 (15.9)	67.7 (19.8)	76.2 (24.6)	75.4 (24.1)	65.3 (18.5)	55.8 (13.2)	41.9 (5.5)	33.5 (0.8)	52.6 (11.4)
Mean daily minimum °F (°C)	6.7 (−14.1)	10.6 (−11.9)	16.7 (−8.5)	26.3 (−3.2)	34.4 (1.3)	40.7 (4.8)	44.2 (6.8)	42.9 (6.1)	36.3 (2.4)	30.1 (−1.1)	20.0 (−6.7)	11.2 (−11.6)	26.7 (−2.9)
Record low °F (°C)	−54 (−48)	−53 (−47)	−39 (−39)	−18 (−28)	2 (−17)	20 (−7)	27 (−3)	21 (−6)	−3 (−19)	−20 (−29)	−31 (−35)	−48 (−44)	−54 (−48)
Average precipitation inches (mm)	0.83 (21)	0.74 (19)	0.99 (25)	1.50 (38)	2.65 (67)	3.52 (89)	1.79 (45)	1.87 (47)	1.93 (49)	1.05 (27)	0.83 (21)	0.82 (21)	18.53 (471)
Average snowfall inches (cm)	10.3 (26)	9.0 (23)	10.5 (27)	7.5 (19)	2.4 (6.1)	0.1 (0.25)	0 (0)	0 (0)	2.9 (7.4)	4.9 (12)	7.7 (20)	9.0 (23)	64.5 (164)
Source: The Western Regional Climate Center

== Demographics ==
Historical population
Census	Pop.	Note	%±
2020	130		—
U.S. Decennial Census

== Education ==
The area school district is Browning Public Schools, with its components being Browning Elementary School District and Browning High School District.
