= Ryegate, Montana =

- Town
- Location of Ryegate, Montana
- Coordinates: 46°17′56″N 109°15′02″W
- Country: United States
- State: Montana
- County: Golden Valley

Area
  - Total: 0.75 sq mi (1.95 km^{2})
  - Land: 0.75 sq mi (1.95 km^{2})
  - Water: 0 sq mi (0.00 km^{2})
- Elevation: 3,648 ft (1,112 m)

Population (2020)
  - Total: 223
  - Density: 295.9/sq mi (114.23/km^{2})
- Time zone: UTC-7 (Mountain (MST))
  - Summer (DST): UTC-6 (MDT)
- ZIP code: 59074
- Area code: 406
- FIPS code: 30-64975
- GNIS feature ID: 2412589

Ryegate is a town in, and the county seat of, Golden Valley County, Montana, United States. The population was 223 at the 2020 census. Ryegate is situated on the north bank of the Musselshell River.

The Milwaukee Road established Ryegate in 1908 as a depot and station stop.

== Geography ==
U.S. Route 12 passes through town.

According to the United States Census Bureau, the town has a total area of 0.69 square miles (1.79 km^{2}), all land.

=== Climate ===
According to the Köppen Climate Classification system, Ryegate has a semi-arid climate, abbreviated "BSk" on climate maps.

Climate data for Ryegate, Montana, 1991–2020 normals, extremes 1962–present
Month	Jan	Feb	Mar	Apr	May	Jun	Jul	Aug	Sep	Oct	Nov	Dec	Year
Record high °F (°C)	67 (19)	73 (23)	80 (27)	86 (30)	93 (34)	100 (38)	106 (41)	100 (38)	99 (37)	95 (35)	79 (26)	66 (19)	106 (41)
Mean maximum °F (°C)	56.2 (13.4)	58.7 (14.8)	68.6 (20.3)	77.6 (25.3)	82.5 (28.1)	87.7 (30.9)	94.2 (34.6)	94.3 (34.6)	90.6 (32.6)	81.6 (27.6)	67.9 (19.9)	56.5 (13.6)	96.0 (35.6)
Mean daily maximum °F (°C)	35.8 (2.1)	38.3 (3.5)	47.1 (8.4)	55.0 (12.8)	63.6 (17.6)	71.8 (22.1)	81.9 (27.7)	81.7 (27.6)	71.7 (22.1)	58.2 (14.6)	45.1 (7.3)	35.9 (2.2)	57.2 (14.0)
Daily mean °F (°C)	23.8 (−4.6)	25.4 (−3.7)	33.5 (0.8)	41.3 (5.2)	50.3 (10.2)	58.6 (14.8)	66.8 (19.3)	65.9 (18.8)	56.2 (13.4)	43.6 (6.4)	32.2 (0.1)	24.2 (−4.3)	43.5 (6.4)
Mean daily minimum °F (°C)	11.8 (−11.2)	12.4 (−10.9)	19.8 (−6.8)	27.5 (−2.5)	37.1 (2.8)	45.5 (7.5)	51.7 (10.9)	50.1 (10.1)	40.7 (4.8)	29.1 (−1.6)	19.3 (−7.1)	12.4 (−10.9)	29.8 (−1.2)
Mean minimum °F (°C)	−15.7 (−26.5)	−10.8 (−23.8)	−2.4 (−19.1)	12.7 (−10.7)	23.9 (−4.5)	33.3 (0.7)	40.4 (4.7)	37.5 (3.1)	26.4 (−3.1)	9.9 (−12.3)	−4.6 (−20.3)	−11.8 (−24.3)	−25.0 (−31.7)
Record low °F (°C)	−44 (−42)	−41 (−41)	−32 (−36)	−10 (−23)	13 (−11)	21 (−6)	32 (0)	28 (−2)	10 (−12)	−15 (−26)	−26 (−32)	−42 (−41)	−44 (−42)
Average precipitation inches (mm)	0.45 (11)	0.38 (9.7)	0.69 (18)	1.45 (37)	2.27 (58)	2.99 (76)	1.61 (41)	1.19 (30)	1.07 (27)	1.03 (26)	0.62 (16)	0.53 (13)	14.28 (362.7)
Average snowfall inches (cm)	8.3 (21)	8.3 (21)	10.1 (26)	6.0 (15)	0.7 (1.8)	0.0 (0.0)	0.0 (0.0)	0.0 (0.0)	0.3 (0.76)	3.6 (9.1)	7.2 (18)	8.4 (21)	52.9 (133.66)
Average precipitation days (≥ 0.01 in)	4.4	4.8	5.8	7.6	9.4	10.6	7.3	5.4	5.1	5.4	4.1	4.6	74.5
Average snowy days (≥ 0.1 in)	4.4	4.6	4.5	3.1	0.5	0.0	0.0	0.0	0.2	1.6	3.4	4.5	26.8
Source 1: NOAA
Source 2: National Weather Service

== Demographics ==
Historical population
Census	Pop.	Note	%±
1920	405		—
1930	292		−27.9%
1940	348		19.2%
1950	339		−2.6%
1960	314		−7.4%
1970	261		−16.9%
1980	273		4.6%
1990	260		−4.8%
2000	268		3.1%
2010	245		−8.6%
2020	223		−9.0%
U.S. Decennial Census

=== 2010 census ===
As of the census of 2010, there were 245 people, 122 households, and 73 families residing in the town. The population density was 355.1 inhabitants per square mile (137.1/km^{2}). There were 145 housing units at an average density of 210.1 per square mile (81.1/km^{2}). The racial makeup of the town was 97.1% White, 0.4% Native American, 0.8% from other races, and 1.6% from two or more races. Hispanic or Latino of any race were 4.1% of the population.

There were 122 households, of which 13.9% had children under the age of 18 living with them, 47.5% were married couples living together, 5.7% had a female householder with no husband present, 6.6% had a male householder with no wife present, and 40.2% were non-families. 31.1% of all households were made up of individuals, and 13.9% had someone living alone who was 65 years of age or older. The average household size was 2.01 and the average family size was 2.48.

The median age in the town was 53.5 years. 11.4% of residents were under the age of 18; 6.6% were between the ages of 18 and 24; 13.4% were from 25 to 44; 39.6% were from 45 to 64; and 29% were 65 years of age or older. The gender makeup of the town was 53.9% male and 46.1% female.

=== 2000 census ===
As of the census of 2000, there were 268 people, 113 households, and 81 families residing in the town. The population density was 391.6 inhabitants per square mile (151.2/km^{2}). There were 131 housing units at an average density of 191.4 per square mile (73.9/km^{2}). The racial makeup of the town was 98.51% White and 1.49% Native American. Hispanic or Latino of any race were 1.49% of the population.

There were 113 households, out of which 26.5% had children under the age of 18 living with them, 66.4% were married couples living together, 4.4% had a female householder with no husband present, and 28.3% were non-families. 25.7% of all households were made up of individuals, and 15.9% had someone living alone who was 65 years of age or older. The average household size was 2.37 and the average family size was 2.84.

In the town, the population was spread out, with 22.0% under the age of 18, 4.5% from 18 to 24, 21.6% from 25 to 44, 24.6% from 45 to 64, and 27.2% who were 65 years of age or older. The median age was 46 years. For every 100 females there were 109.4 males. For every 100 females age 18 and over, there were 99.0 males.

The median income for a household in the town was $26,250, and the median income for a family was $34,167. Males had a median income of $19,688 versus $18,750 for females. The per capita income for the town was $12,016. About 20.0% of families and 20.2% of the population were below the poverty line, including 15.9% of those under the age of eighteen and 32.5% of those 65 or over.

== Education ==
Ryegate Public School educates students from kindergarten through 12th grade. They are known as the Blue Demons. Ryegate High School is a Class C school (less than 108 students) which determines athletic competitions.

In 2023, Ryegate joined with Harlowton and Judith Gap to co-op for high school sports.
