= Armington, Montana =

Village in Cascade County, Montana, United States

Coordinates: 47°21′59″N 110°54′13″W

Armington is a village in Cascade County, Montana near the town of Belt and the Belt Creek. The village's zip code is 59412. It is close to the Armington Junction, where U.S. Highway 89 meets U.S. Highway 87. Armington Junction provides access to many of the communities in Meagher and Park County.
