= Monarch, Montana =

Unincorporated community in Montana, United States

- Unincorporated community
- Location within Montana Location within the United States
- Coordinates: 47°06′01″N 110°50′41″W
- Country: United States
- State: Montana
- County: Cascade

Area
  - Total: 0.80 sq mi (2.08 km^{2})
  - Land: 0.80 sq mi (2.08 km^{2})
  - Water: 0 sq mi (0.00 km^{2})
- Elevation: 4,616 ft (1,407 m)

Population (2020)
  - Total: 26
  - Density: 32/sq mi (12.5/km^{2})
- Time zone: UTC-7 (Mountain (MST))
  - Summer (DST): UTC-6 (MDT)
- ZIP code: 59463
- Area code: 406
- GNIS feature ID: 2804695

Monarch is an unincorporated community in Cascade County, Montana, United States. As of the 2020 census, Monarch had a population of 26.

== History ==
Monarch has existed since the early days of mining in the Little Belt Mountains of Cascade County. Other mining claims were called King, Czar, Emperor, Rex, and Sultan. The Montana Central Railway connected Monarch to Great Falls in 1889. The line continued operation until November 3, 1945.

== Geography ==
Monarch is located in the Little Belt Mountains of central Montana, southeast of Great Falls, on US Highway 89 in the Lewis and Clark National Forest.

=== Climate ===
According to the Köppen Climate Classification system, Monarch has a semi-arid climate, abbreviated "BSk" on climate maps.

== Demographics ==
Historical population
Census	Pop.	Note	%±
2020	26		—
U.S. Decennial Census
