= Duncan Ranch Colony, Montana =

- Census-designated place
- Location within Montana Location within the United States
- Coordinates: 46°26′31″N 110°01′35″W
- Country: United States
- State: Montana
- County: Wheatland

Area
  - Total: 0.61 sq mi (1.57 km^{2})
  - Land: 0.61 sq mi (1.57 km^{2})
  - Water: 0 sq mi (0.00 km^{2})
- Elevation: 4,354 ft (1,327 m)

Population (2020)
  - Total: 7
  - Density: 11.6/sq mi (4.47/km^{2})
- Time zone: UTC-7 (Mountain (MST))
  - Summer (DST): UTC-6 (MDT)
- ZIP Codes: 59036 (Harlowton); 59085 (Two Dot)
- Area code: 406
- FIPS code: 30-22130
- GNIS feature ID: 2804317

Duncan Ranch Colony is a Hutterite community and census-designated place (CDP) in Wheatland County, Montana, United States. It is in the west-central part of the county, on the south side of U.S. Route 12, 9 miles (14 km) west of Harlowton, the county seat, and 3 miles (5 km) east of Twodot. The Musselshell River flows eastward through the colony. As of the 2020 census, Duncan Ranch Colony had a population of 7.

The community was first listed as a CDP prior to the 2020 census.

== Demographics ==
Historical population
Census	Pop.	Note	%±
2020	7		—
U.S. Decennial Census

== Education ==
It is zoned to Harlowton Public Schools.
