= Martinsdale Colony, Montana =

- Census-designated place
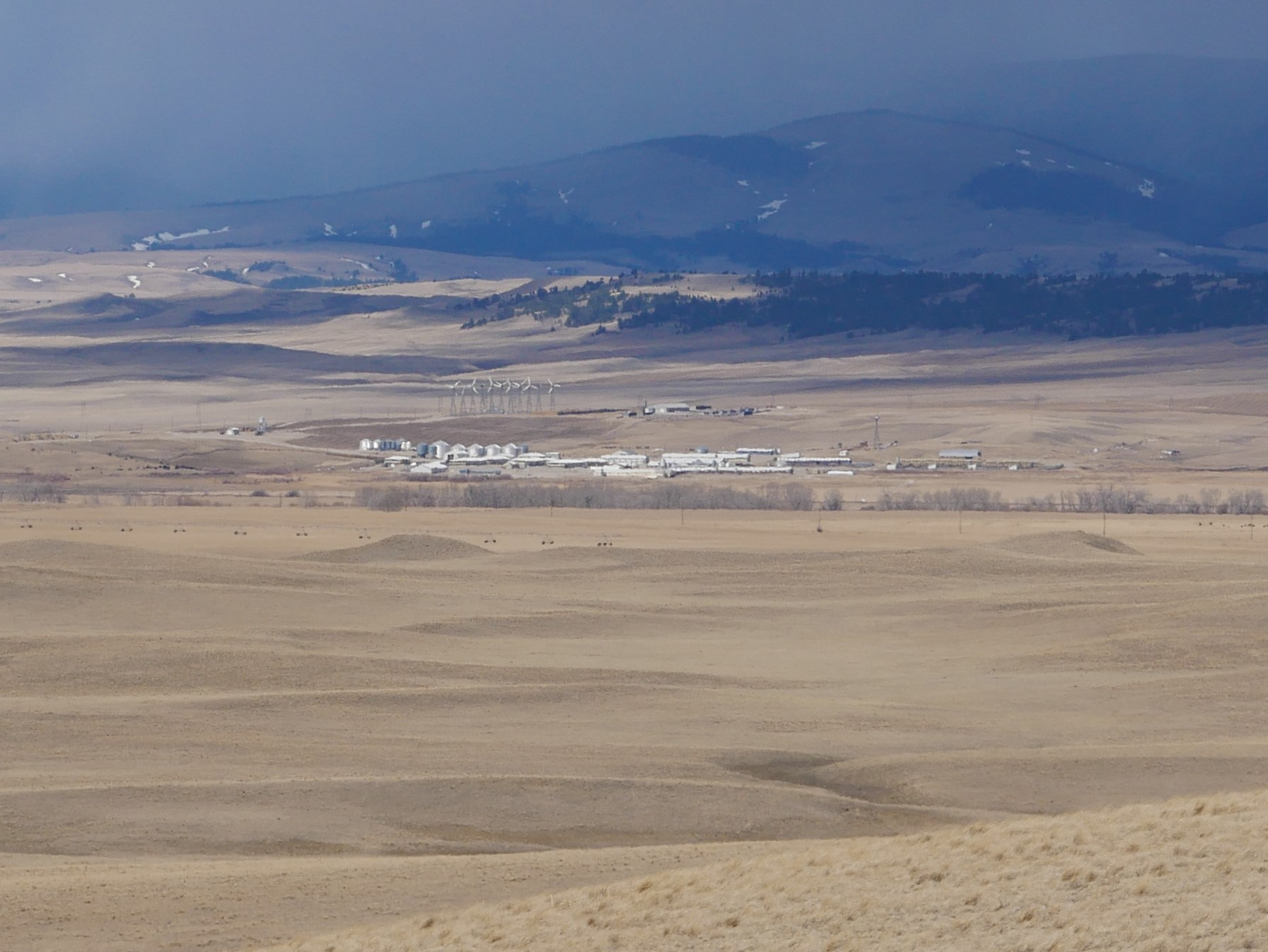
- Martinsdale Colony

- Location within Montana Location within the United States
- Coordinates: 46°29′23″N 110°15′38″W
- Country: United States
- State: Montana
- County: Wheatland

Area
  - Total: 2.22 sq mi (5.76 km^{2})
  - Land: 2.22 sq mi (5.76 km^{2})
  - Water: 0 sq mi (0.00 km^{2})
- Elevation: 4,689 ft (1,429 m)

Population (2020)
  - Total: 97
  - Density: 43.6/sq mi (16.84/km^{2})
- Time zone: UTC-7 (Mountain (MST))
  - Summer (DST): UTC-6 (MDT)
- ZIP Code: 59053 (Martinsdale)
- Area code: 406
- FIPS code: 30-48190
- GNIS feature ID: 2804318

Martinsdale Colony is a Hutterite community and census-designated place (CDP) in Wheatland County, Montana, United States. As of the 2020 census, Martinsdale Colony had a population of 97. It is on the western edge of the county, bordered to the west by Meagher County and 4 miles (6 km) northeast of the unincorporated community of Martinsdale. The Musselshell River forms the southern edge of the CDP.

U.S. Route 12 runs through the southern part of the CDP, leading east 22 miles (35 km) to Harlowton, the Wheatland county seat, and west 36 miles (58 km) to White Sulphur Springs.

The community was first listed as a CDP prior to the 2020 census.

== Demographics ==
Historical population
Census	Pop.	Note	%±
2020	97		—
U.S. Decennial Census

== Education ==
The community is zoned to Harlowton Public Schools.
