= South Fork Musselshell River =

River in Montana, US

Coordinates: 46°28′46″N 110°16′21″W

The South Fork Musselshell River is a tributary of the Musselshell River in south central Montana in the United States. It is approximately 32 miles long.

It rises in the Lewis and Clark National Forest in the Crazy Mountains in southern Meagher County. It flows northeast, joining the North Fork to form the Musselshell near Martinsdale just west of county line with Wheatland County.

There are five native fish found in the river: Longnose dace, Longnose Sucker, Mottled sculpin, Mountain Whitefish, and White Sucker. Three varieties of trout are introduced species.

== See also ==
- List of rivers of Montana
- Montana Stream Access Law
