= H. G. Merriam =

American literary critic (1883–1980)

- Born: Harold Guy Merriam; September 6, 1883; Westminster, Massachusetts
- Died: March 26, 1980 (aged 96); Missoula, Montana
- Other name: Harold G. Merriam
- Spouses: Doris W. Foote (m. 1915; died 1970) Frances Dummer Logan (m. 1974)
- Children: 2

Academic background
- Education: Lincoln College, Oxford (BA, MA); Columbia University (PhD)

Academic work
- Discipline: Literature
- Institutions: Whitman College; Beloit College; Reed College; University of Montana; University of Oregon

Harold Guy Merriam (September 6, 1883 – March 26, 1980) was an American literary critic and professor of literature. A Rhodes Scholar, he was a founder and editor of literary magazines and an anthropologist of regional writing.

== Early education ==
Merriam was born in Westminster, Massachusetts. He graduated from Denver (Colorado) High School in June 1902, and entered the University of Wyoming where he majored in science and the classics. He received his BA from Wyoming in 1905. In 1904 he was chosen to be a member of the first group of Rhodes Scholars. He attended Lincoln College, Oxford University, where he was enrolled in the honors school in English language and literature. He was awarded a BA from Oxford in 1907 and an MA in 1912.

== Career ==
Merriam taught at Whitman College in Walla Walla, Washington, from 1908 to 1910. In the fall of 1910, he enrolled at Harvard University as an Austin Fellow. Merriam left Harvard, where he studied drama, after the fall term to teach at Beloit College in Wisconsin, where he remained until 1913. He then taught at Reed College in Portland, Oregon, until 1919. During World War I, Merriam took a leave of absence from his teaching career and went with YMCA to France, where he taught English to French officers. After the Armistice he was transferred to London, where he assisted American officers and enlisted men in entering British universities.

The University of Montana hired him in 1919 to teach English and to chair the English department. Merriam introduced creative writing into the curriculum. To encourage his students to write, he began editing their works and publishing them in a new magazine, The Frontier. This later merged with the Midland, published in Iowa City, Iowa, to form Frontier and Midland. This well-respected regional literary magazine encouraged students and writers not only from Montana, but from throughout the Pacific Northwest. The publication featured the early efforts of regional writers A.B. Guthrie, Dorothy M. Johnson, Helen Addison Howard, Grace Stone Coates, and others. Publication of the journal continued until 1939.

Merriam began a series of writer's conferences in Montana in the summer of 1930. These short conferences offered creative writers the opportunity to work with such nationally known writers as Struthers Burt, Mary Austin, Frank Ernest Hill, and others. The conferences continued through the summer of 1934, were suspended until 1948 and continued through the summer of 1960. Following the formation of the Montana Academy of Sciences in 1940, Merriam formulated the idea for the Montana Institute of the Arts, which was founded in 1948. He served as its first president and in 1957 became the editor of the Montana Institute of the Arts Quarterly, a position he filled until 1964.

From 1907 to 1919, the University of Montana had no Rhodes Scholars. Merriam became very active in the program; with his encouragement, sixteen University of Montana students went to Oxford between 1919 and 1970. He was an enthusiastic supporter of the program and served many years on its regional and local committees.

In 1933, in addition to his duties as chairman of the English department, Merriam was appointed chairman of the Division of Humanities, a new concept in University administration. He continued carrying the two assignments until his retirement in 1954. In December 1935, Merriam was appointed state supervisor of the Federal Writers' Project. His efforts culminated in the publication of Montana, A State Guide Book in 1939. He also took leave from the University of Montana in 1939 to teach at the University of Oregon in Eugene, and earned his Ph.D. in English from Columbia University.

== Legacy ==
Merriam was instrumental in the recognition of the importance and accomplishments of American and Northwest writers. Prior to his work and that of others, literary studies in the United States were largely confined to British authors; an individual with a college degree in English would usually have studied no American authors. In recognition of his accomplishments, the University of Wyoming awarded him an LL.D. in 1962, citing his record as "Rhodes Scholar, professor of literature, founder and editor of magazines for new writers in the Northwest, anthropologist of regional writing, pioneer in the discovery of the cultural potentialities of his region."

In 1963, an honorary LL.D. followed from the University of Montana Missoula. In 1978, he was honored at the 75th dinner celebration of the Rhodes Scholars in New York. The University of Montana Creative Writing Program gives out the annual Merriam-Frontier Award to the best submitted piece of writing in the fields of poetry, fiction, or creative nonfiction in his honor.

== Personal life ==
Merriam married Doris W. Foote in 1915 and they had two children: Alan and Alison. After Doris's death in 1970, he married Frances Dummer Logan in 1974. Merriam died in Missoula, Montana, on March 26, 1980, at the age of 96.
