= Great Falls station =

Great Falls
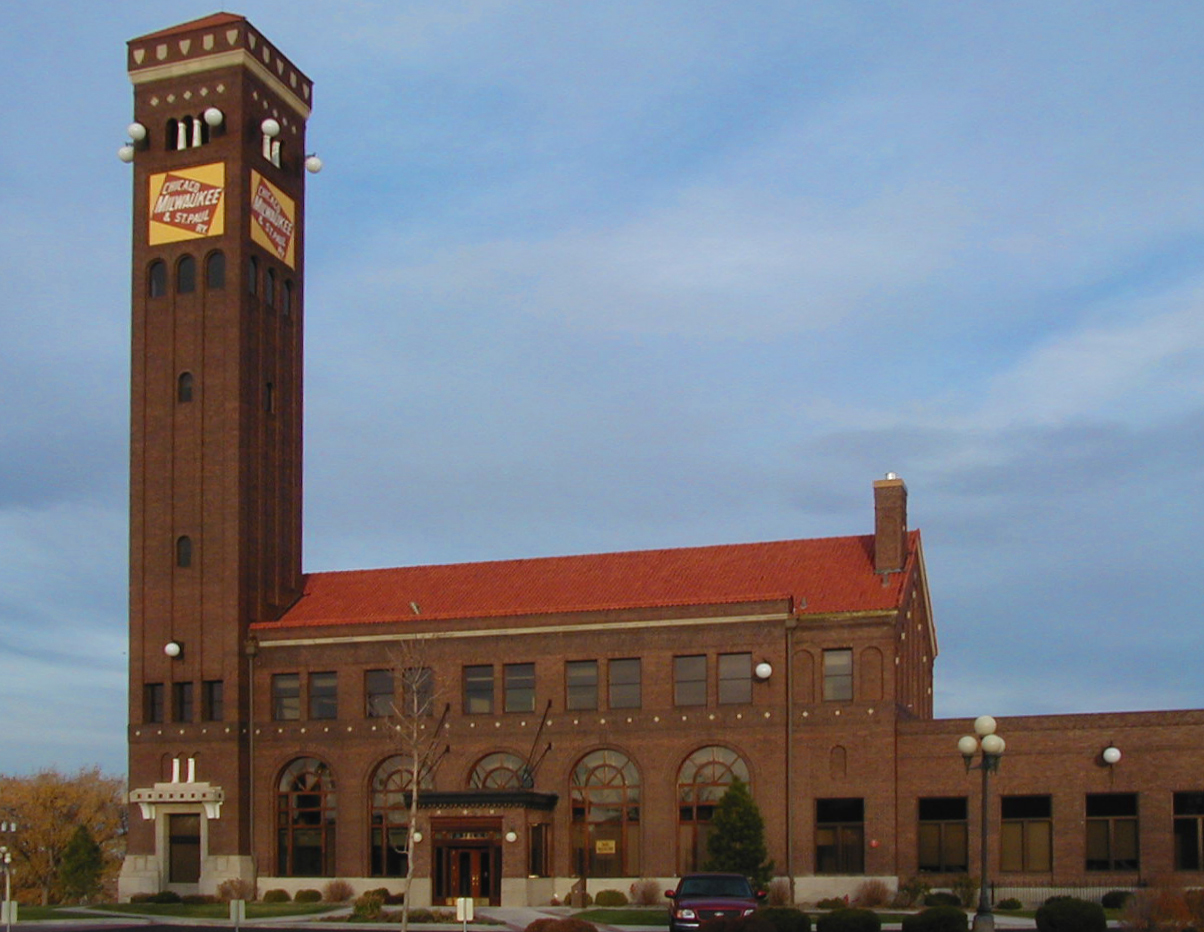
- Great Falls Milwaukee Road Depot, May 2002.

General information
- Location: 101 River Drive, Great Falls, Montana 59401
- System: Former Milwaukee Road passenger rail station

History
- Opened: 1908
- Closed: 1954
- Rebuilt: 1915

Services
Preceding station	Milwaukee Road	Following station
Manchester toward Agawam	Northern Montana Division	Falls Yard toward Harlowton
- Chicago, Milwaukee and St. Paul Passenger Depot
- U.S. National Register of Historic Places
- Location within Montana
- Location: Central Avenue and River Drive North; Great Falls, Montana
- Coordinates: 47°30′26″N 111°18′31″W
- Built: 1915
- Architect: J.A. Lindstrand
- Architectural style: Mission Revival
- NRHP reference No.: 88001119
- Added to NRHP: October 13, 1988
Location

The Chicago, Milwaukee and St. Paul Passenger Depot, located in Great Falls, Montana, was built in 1915 by the Chicago, Milwaukee, St. Paul and Pacific Railroad (also known as The Milwaukee Road). The Milwaukee Road was the last transcontinental railroad that entered Montana in 1907–1908 as a part of its "Pacific Extension".

The depot is a two-story brick building that includes a 135-foot tower. The building is rectangular in shape. The first floor held the waiting rooms, station agent's office and baggage rooms. Railroad offices were located on the second floor. It was designed by architect J. A. Lindstrand, who also designed the Milwaukee Depot in Missoula, Montana.

The depot continued to serve passengers until December 1, 1954, when the Milwaukee Road began ticketing and boarding at the nearby Great Northern station. By August 1955 the Milwaukee Road had ceased passenger service to Great Falls. The building sat vacant until it was converted into a retail mall in the 1970s. The mall closed in the early 1980s. In 1988, the building was converted into an office building.
