= List of mountains in Wheatland County, Montana =

There are at least 10 named mountains in Wheatland County, Montana.

- Bartleson Peak, 46°40′22″N 110°09′15″W, el. 7,506 feet (2,288 m)
- Bluff Mountain, 46°40′54″N 110°15′16″W, el. 8,238 feet (2,511 m)
- Cinnamon Peak (Montana), 46°16′27″N 110°16′19″W, el. 8,645 feet (2,635 m)
- Coffin Butte, 46°20′42″N 110°13′25″W, el. 6,243 feet (1,903 m)
- Elephant Rock, 46°40′09″N 110°07′36″W, el. 6,653 feet (2,028 m)
- Haystack Butte, 46°26′41″N 109°32′47″W, el. 4,426 feet (1,349 m)
- Indian Butte, 46°16′58″N 109°25′15″W, el. 4,308 feet (1,313 m)
- Oka Butte, 46°42′31″N 109°51′33″W, el. 6,073 feet (1,851 m)
- Suicide Hill, 46°26′07″N 110°04′35″W, el. 4,511 feet (1,375 m)
- Wild Horse Butte, 46°20′41″N 109°44′33″W, el. 4,833 feet (1,473 m)

== See also ==
- List of mountains in Montana
