= Musselshell River =

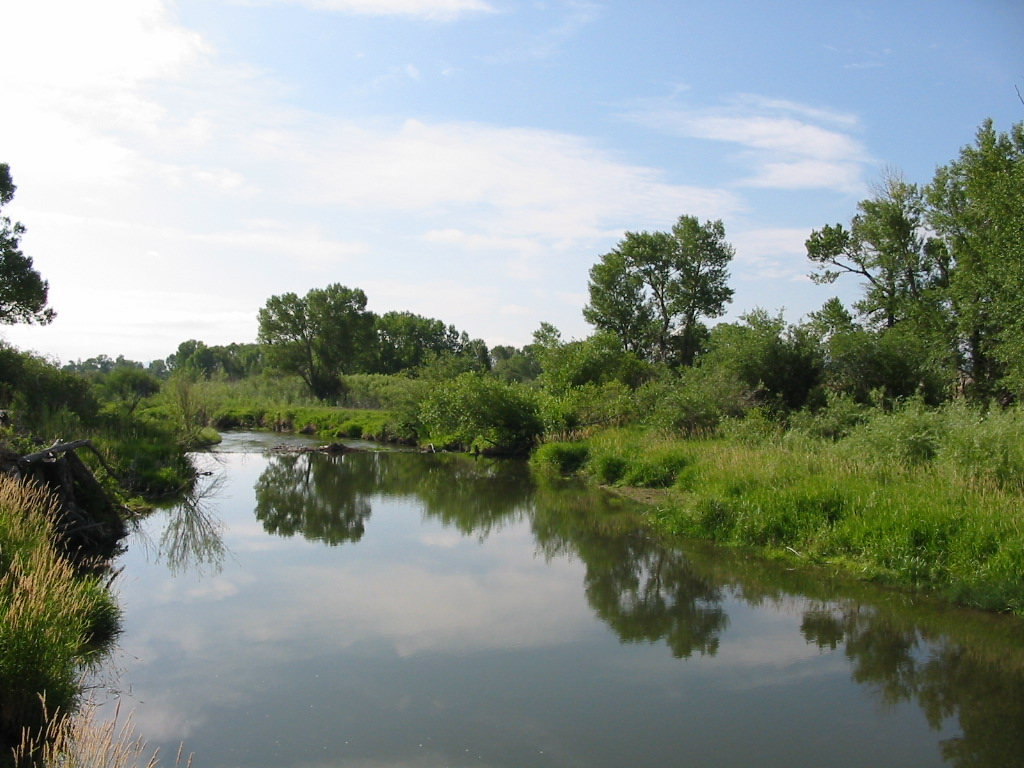

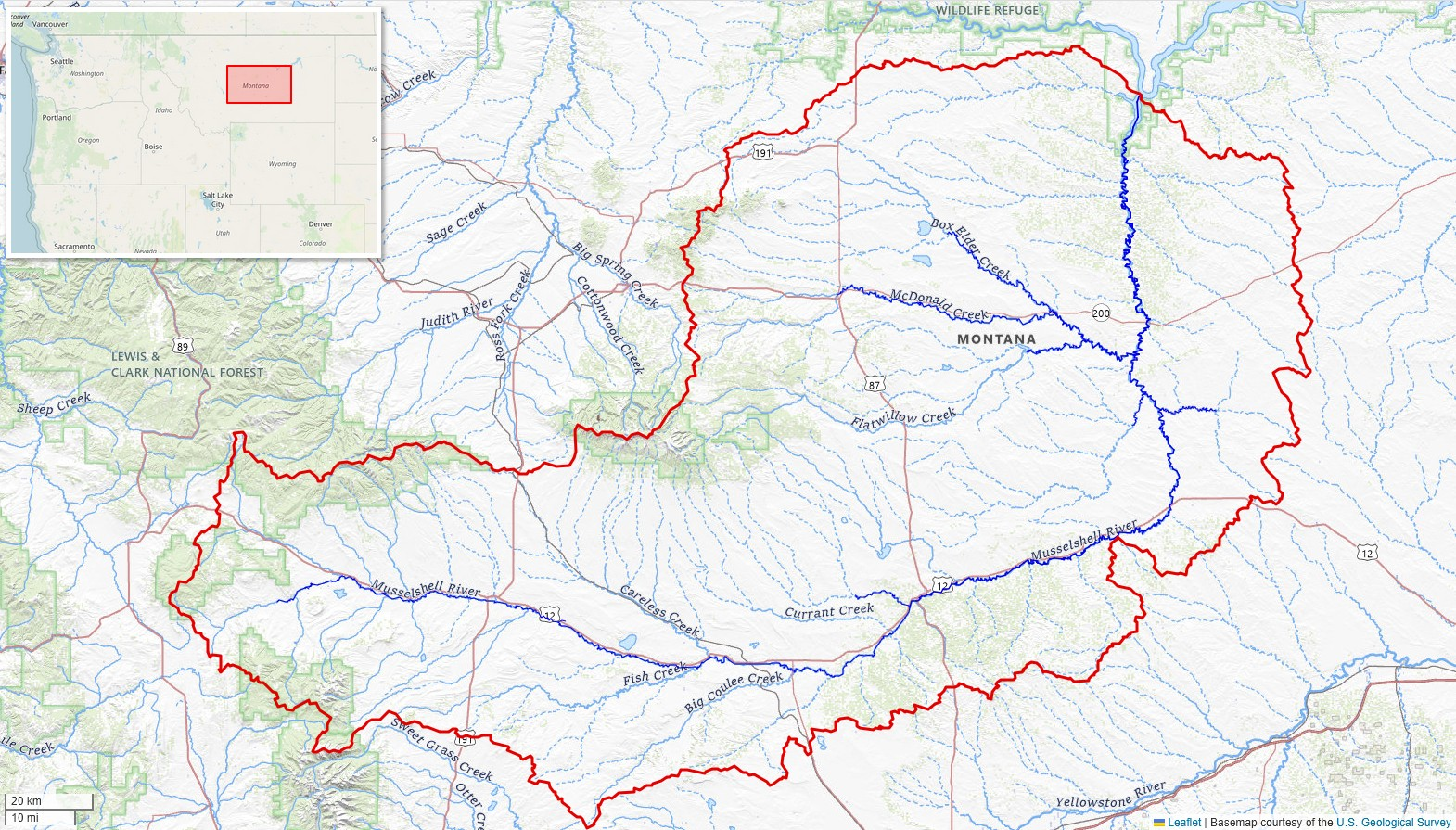
- Musselshell River watershed (Interactive map)

Location
- Counties: Petroleum, Phillips, Rosebud, Musselshell, Golden Valley and Wheatland County, Montana

Physical characteristics
- Source
  - coordinates: 46°18′56.1″N 110°39′53.7″W
- Mouth
  - coordinates: 47°22′29″N 107°56′35″W
  - elevation: 2,247 ft (685 m)
- Length: 342 mi (550 km)
- Basin size: 9,570 mi^{2} (24,800 km^{2})
- Discharge
  - average: 253 cu ft/s (7.2 m^{3}/s)

Basin features
- River system: Missouri River

The Musselshell River is a tributary of the Missouri River, 341.9 miles (550.2 km) long from its origins at the confluence of its North and South Forks near Martinsdale, Montana to its mouth on the Missouri River. It is located east of the Continental divide entirely within Montana in the United States. Counting its pre-confluence tributaries, it measures 425–500 miles (684–805 km) in length.

It rises in several forks in the Crazy, Little Belt, and Castle mountains in central Montana. The main branch is formed by the confluence of the North Fork and South Fork in Meagher County, about 25 miles (40 km) east of White Sulphur Springs, Montana, just east of Martinsdale, north of Martinsdale Reservoir, and just west of Meagher County's border with Wheatland County. The North Fork flows south from the Little Belt Mountains through Bair Reservoir, then southeast. The South Fork flows northeast from the Crazy Mountains. From the confluence of these two waterways, the main branch flows roughly due east past Two Dot, Harlowton, and Roundup, then turns north just past Melstone, and continues to the UL Bend on the Missouri River at the beginning of Fort Peck Reservoir.

The Musselshell River has also been known as: Cockkleshell River, Mahtush-ahzhah, Muscleshell River, Mustleshell River, Shell River. The Musselshell was entered by the Lewis and Clark Expedition on May 20, 1805 and named by them for the freshwater mussels lining the bank, noting in their journals that the Minnetare people had given the waterway a similar name. The Blackfeet, who hunted buffalo and prepared the meat for winter in the Musselshell area, called it the Dried Meat River.

== Geography ==
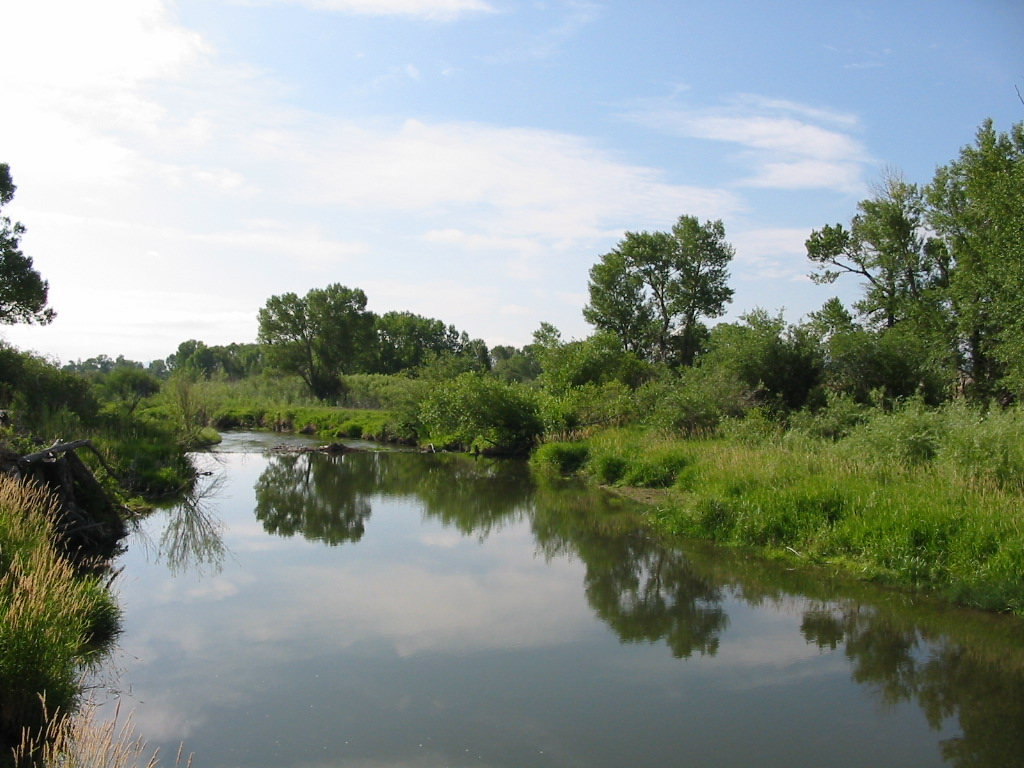
Banks of the Musselshell River near Selkirk.

The terrain varies from the mountainous island ranges where it originates to prairie. It is fed largely by snowmelt and has its highest flow rates in the spring and early summer. The Musselshell River Basin, including tributaries, drains 108,268 acres (438.1 km^{2}). The South Fork has much brush, gravel bars, and clear water. The North Fork has willow trees and undercut banks. The Musselshell is about 60 feet (20 m) wide at its confluence of the two forks. Three reservoirs built in the 1930s help control the river's flow: Bair Reservoir on the North Fork, Martinsdale Reservoir near the confluence, and Deadman's Basin on the main river between Shawmut and Ryegate. The river becomes wider in the 50 miles (80 km) before Roundup. Honeysuckle, wild rose, willow, and cottonwood are common in this section. The river is about 100 feet (30 m) wide in its last 90 miles (140 km), with increased choppiness and flow rate. The relatively more arid climate in this section results in less vegetation, more livestock grazing, and poorer soil. Additional tributaries of the Musselshell include: Middle Fork, Bozeman Fork, Dry Fork, American Creek Fork, Big Elk Creek, Careless Creek, Cottonwood Creek, Flat Willow Creek, Hopley Creek, Spring Creek, Swimming Woman Creek, and Willow Creek.

== Usage ==
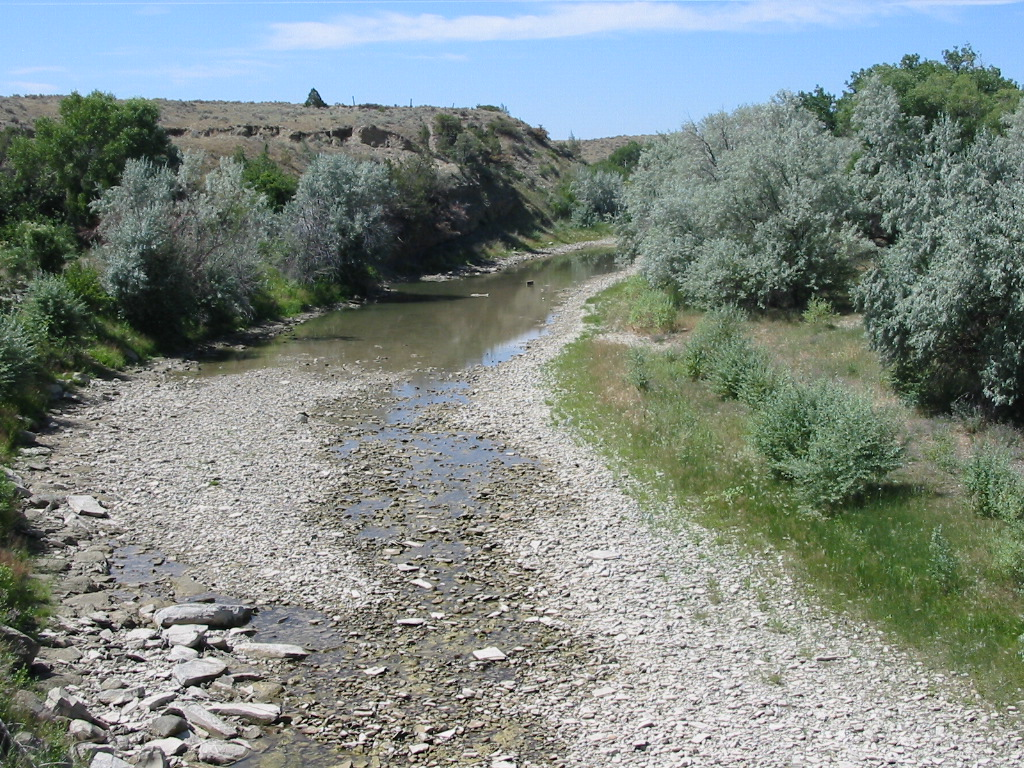
Musselshell River during dry season near Ryegate.

Recreational use of the Musselshell averages 63,000 visitor-days per year. Much of the water on the Musselshell is decreed water and managed by the Musselshell River Distribution Project. The Musselshell is used extensively for irrigation for farming and ranching and due to that may run dry or nearly dry in many sections during much of the summer and fall. Water supply is less in the lower basin due to the more arid climate and the fact that users in the upper basin have senior rights to the water. Fishing is popular along most parts of the Musselshell. Species of fish found on the North and/or South Forks down to Harlowton include: mountain whitefish, and brown, cutthroat, rainbow, and brook trout. The eastern part of the river has channel catfish, sauger, smallmouth bass, and walleye due to the warmer water caused by dewatering from irrigation and the arid climate shift from mountain to prairie ecosystems in the Musselshell's last 90 miles (140 km). There are three different species of freshwater mussels as well as crawdads.

The Gordon Butte Pumped Storage Project is a planned pumped hydroelectric power plant that will use water from the Cottonwood Creek, a Musselshell tributary.

== Spring 2011 flood ==
There was major flooding on the Musselshell River in May 2011. On May 26 the flooding inundated portions of Roundup. Cresting and flow rate records were set along several sections of the river, such as Mosby and Shawmut, near Harlowton. The crest of the flood at 14.16 feet (4.32 m), more than 4 feet (1.2 m) over flood state, exceeded the record previously set in 1975.

== Legacy ==
The Musselshell region is where the last surviving herds of wild American buffalo lived. Zoologist William Temple Hornaday of the Smithsonian Institution harvested specimens from the region in 1886 so that future generations would know what the buffalo looked like. The Musselshell was mentioned by both Del Gue and Jeremiah Johnson in the film Jeremiah Johnson. The Musselshell is also mentioned in Larry McMurtry's classic 1985 novel Lonesome Dove. Roundup is home to the Musselshell Valley Historical Museum, which documents the region's history.

== See also ==
- 2011 Mississippi River floods
- 2011 Missouri River floods
- 2011 Souris River flood
- List of rivers of Montana
- Montana Stream Access Law
