= Wheatland County Airport =

Airport in Montana, United States

- IATA: none; ICAO: KHWQ; FAA LID: HWQ

Summary
- Airport type: Public
- Owner: Wheatland County
- Serves: Harlowton, Montana
- Elevation AMSL: 4,311 ft (1,314 m)
- Coordinates: 46°26′55″N 109°51′10″W
- Interactive map of Wheatland County Airport

Runways
Direction	Length		Surface
Direction	ft	m	Surface
8/26	4,200	1,280	Asphalt

Statistics (2011)
- Aircraft operations: 2,275
- Based aircraft: 7
- Source: Federal Aviation Administration

Wheatland County Airport (ICAO: KHWQ, FAA LID: HWQ) is a county-owned, public-use airport located two nautical miles (4 km) northwest of the central business district of Harlowton, a city in Wheatland County, Montana, United States. It is included in the National Plan of Integrated Airport Systems for 2011–2015, which categorized it as a general aviation airport.

Although many U.S. airports use the same three-letter location identifier for the FAA and IATA, this facility is assigned HWQ by the FAA but has no designation from the IATA.

== Facilities and aircraft ==
The airport covers an area of 160 acres (65 ha) at an elevation of 4,311 feet (1,314 m) above mean sea level. It has one runway designated 8/26 with an asphalt surface measuring 4,200 by 60 feet (1,280 x 18 m).

For the 12-month period ending July 19, 2011, the airport had 2,275 aircraft operations, an average of 189 per month: 92% general aviation, 6% air taxi, and 2% military. At that time there were 7 aircraft based at this airport: 86% single-engine, and 14% multi-engine.

== See also ==
- List of airports in Montana
