= Maudlow, Montana =

- Unincorporated community
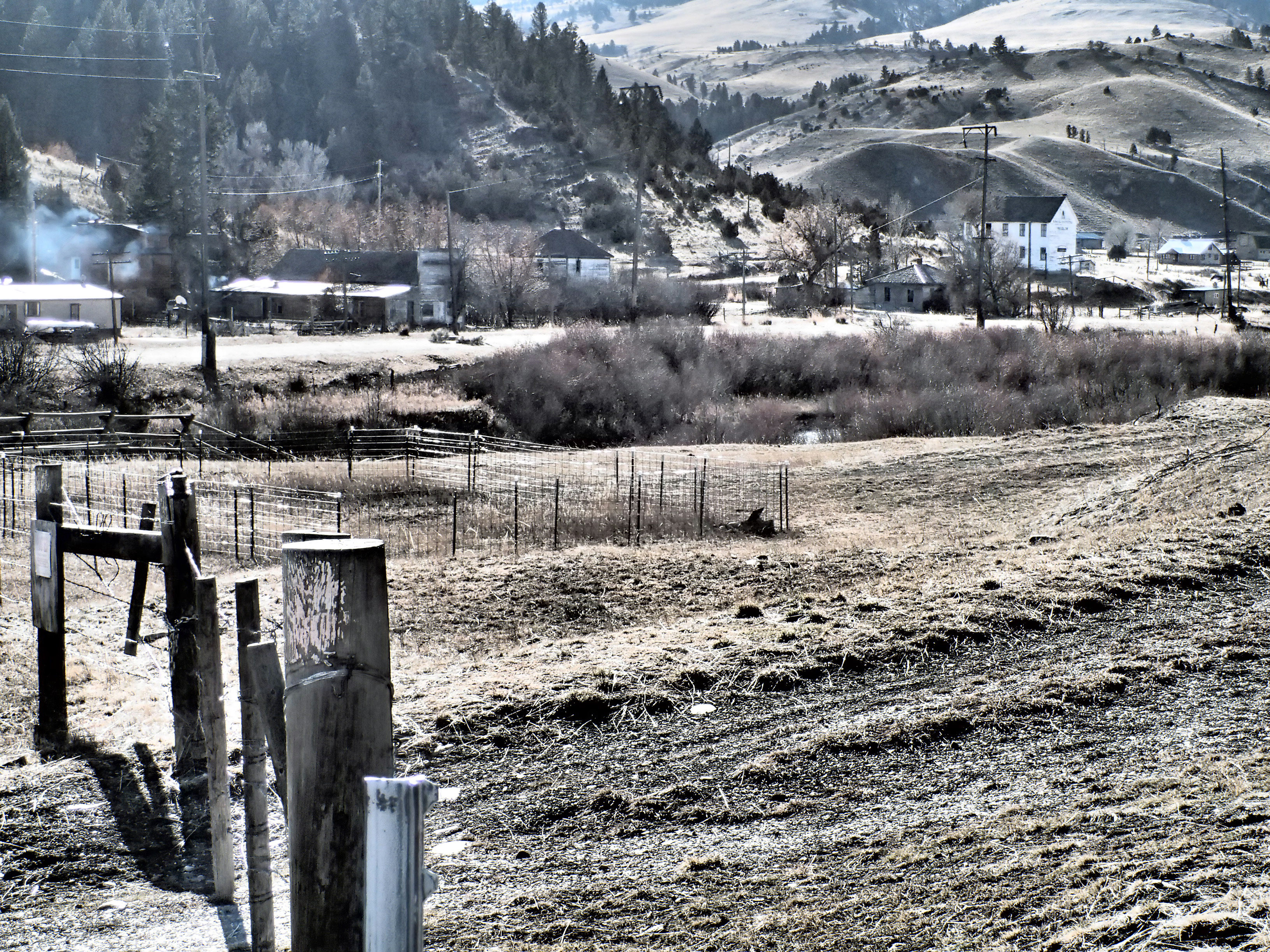
- Maudlow, 2015

- Location within Montana Location within the United States
- Coordinates: 46°06′28″N 111°10′23″W
- Country: United States
- State: Montana
- County: Gallatin
- Elevation: 4,410 ft (1,340 m)
- GNIS feature ID: 0786930

Maudlow is a small unincorporated community in northern Gallatin County, Montana, United States. The town was a station stop on the transcontinental main line of the Chicago, Milwaukee, St. Paul and Pacific Railroad ("the Milwaukee Road"), and was a community center for a small number of area ranchers and homesteaders. Maudlow was named after a family member of Montana Railroad President R. A. Harlow, Maud Harlow. The first postmaster of the town, George Dodge, shortened the name to Maudlow.

The town is in a narrow valley alongside Sixteen Mile Creek, and near the midpoint of Sixteen Mile Canyon. The canyon, also historically known as "Montana Canyon," was considered a scenic highlight of the Milwaukee Road line.

The population of Maudlow was never large, and by the late 20th century only a handful of residents remained in the area. The railroad through Maudlow was abandoned in 1980, and Maudlow is now nearly a ghost town. It is part of the Bozeman, MT Micropolitan Statistical Area.
