= Springwater Colony, Montana =

- Census-designated place
- Location within Montana Location within the United States
- Coordinates: 46°27′25″N 109°45′06″W
- Country: United States
- State: Montana
- County: Wheatland

Area
  - Total: 0.24 sq mi (0.61 km^{2})
  - Land: 0.24 sq mi (0.61 km^{2})
  - Water: 0 sq mi (0.00 km^{2})
- Elevation: 4,439 ft (1,353 m)

Population (2020)
  - Total: 119
  - Density: 507.8/sq mi (196.06/km^{2})
- Time zone: UTC-7 (Mountain (MST))
  - Summer (DST): UTC-6 (MDT)
- ZIP Code: 59036 (Harlowton)
- Area code: 406
- FIPS code: 30-70434
- GNIS feature ID: 2804319

Springwater Colony is a Hutterite community and census-designated place (CDP) in Wheatland County, Montana, United States. It is in the east-central part of the county, 4 miles (6 km) northeast of Harlowton, the county seat. As of the 2020 census, Springwater Colony had a population of 119.

The community was first listed as a CDP prior to the 2020 census.

== Demographics ==
Historical population
Census	Pop.	Note	%±
2020	119		—
U.S. Decennial Census

== Education ==
It is zoned to Harlowton Public Schools.
