= NEEA =

NEEA may refer to:

- National Education Examinations Authority, an independent non-profit institution under the Ministry of Education of China
- National Environmental Education Act, an act of the United States Congress to promote environmental education
- Northwest Energy Efficiency Alliance, a non-profit organization working to accelerate energy efficiency in the Pacific Northwest
