= North Fork Musselshell River =

Coordinates: 46°28′47″N 110°16′21″W

The North Fork Musselshell River is a tributary of the Musselshell River, approximately 35 miles (56 km) long, in Montana in the United States.

It rises in the Lewis and Clark National Forest in the Little Belt Mountains in northeastern Meagher County, and flows south through Bair Reservoir, then southeast. It joins the South Fork to form the main branch of the Musselshell just west of county line with Wheatland County.

There are five native fish found in the river: Longnose dace, Longnose Sucker, Mottled sculpin, Mountain Whitefish, and White Sucker. Three varieties of trout are introduced species.

== See also ==
- List of rivers of Montana
- Montana Stream Access Law
