= Grace Stone Coates =

American author (1881–1976)

- A photo of Coates provided to Falcon Publishing for the biography, Honey Wine & Hunger Root, written in 1985 by Lee Rostad
- Born: May 20, 1881; Kansas, US
- Died: 1976; Montana, US
- Occupation: Author

Grace Stone Coates (1881–1976) wrote short stories, poetry, and news articles. She did most of her writing out of her home in Martinsdale, Montana. Coates published her first poem, "The Intruder", in 1921 and her first series of linked stories, Black Cherries, in 1931. She co-edited and wrote for Frontier, a literary magazine edited by Harold G. Merriam, a creative writing professor at the University of Montana.

== History ==
=== Early life ===
On May 20, 1881, Grace Genevieve Stone was born on a wheat farm in Kansas to Heinrich and Olive Stone. She was the youngest of four children. Grace and her older sister, Helen, were born to Heinrich and Olive. The two older children were born to Heinrich and his first wife. Heinrich had a rich classical background; he taught Greek in Berlin before coming to the United States. He channeled his love of the classics into his interactions with Grace, recited poetry to her, took her on long walks to learn the names of plants and trees, and read her mythology until she could recite it from memory. Her poetry was greatly influenced by her childhood and by her father.

Her family moved to Wisconsin when she was in high school, where she attended Oshkosh State Normal School. Coates also attended the University of Chicago, the University of Southern California and the University of Hawaiʻi. She never finished a degree, but received her teaching certificate in 1900.

=== Montana ===
Grace moved to Stevensville, Montana, to be closer to her sister Helen, and started teaching. She later moved to Butte, where she met her future husband, Henderson Coates. The two married in 1910 and moved to Martinsdale, where her husband opened a general store with his brother. Grace taught in Martinsdale from 1914 to 1919 and was the Meagher County Superintendent from 1918 to 1921. This is where she started writing. Her first poem, "The Intruder", was published in Poetry, a Magazine of Verse.

In 1927 H.G. Merriam asked Coates to help him with a literary magazine, The Frontier: A Magazine of the West. She started writing articles and poems for the magazine and before long became the assistant editor. Merriam encouraged her to get her work published, helped her find publishers, and in 1931 she published her first short story collection, Black Cherries, and her first book of poems, Mead & Mangel-Wurzel. Coates worked for the magazine based in northwest Montana until it stopped circulating in 1939. During the Great Depression, Coates helped write the WPA Federal Writers' Project Montana state guidebook. Coates stopped writing seriously in the 1930s, but she continued to participate in her favorite form of writing through letters. After her death, her letters were collected and used to illustrate her life in a biography written by Lee Rostad.

Grace started losing some of her mental capacity when her husband died. She began to see things that were not there, such as intruders in her house, and was found wandering around outside in the middle of the night. She had a hard time remembering when and what she ate, and suffered from malnutrition. Her neighbors in Martinsdale got together in 1963 to move her to a retirement home in Bozeman. There, with a healthy diet and adequate rest, she was able to write a column for the Bozeman Daily Chronicle. The column was named Hillcrest Highlights, for the Hillcrest Retirement Home in which she lived. Coates died in 1976 at the age of 95. According to her wishes, her body was cremated and the ashes were scattered west of Martinsdale in one of the places she loved to walk.

== Work ==
In the 1920s and early 1930s, Coates published well over a hundred poems and short stories. She edited for Caxton Press, Frontier, and wrote stories for local and Montana state papers. She published a short story collection and two books of poetry in the early 1930s. She also wrote many letters. Her writing drew inspiration from her childhood, her love of nature, her love for her husband Henderson, and bouts with depression. Coates stopped writing in the late 1930s. She began to write letters again when she moved to a Bozeman retirement home.

Historian Lee Rostad knew Coates when she lived in Martinsdale and wanted to make sure her legacy was not forgotten. After Coates's death, she took it upon herself to collect as many letters and unpublished work as she could find and publish them. Grace Stone Coates: Honey Wine and Hunger Root, was her biography, published in 1985. Rostad published two other books about Coates, one a collection of poetry, Food of Gods and Starvelings, and a collection of letters and unpublished poems, Grace Stone Coates, Her Life in Letters.

=== Books, stories ===
- Black Cherries, Alfred Knopf 1931
- Mead & Mangel-Wurzel, Caxton Printers Ltd. Caldwell, Idaho, 1931
- Portulacas in the Wheat, her second book of poems, 1932
- Riding the High Country, (Co-authored with Pat Tucker), 1933
- Wild Plums, in Best American Short Stories of the Century, eds. John Updike, Katrina Kenison (Boston: Houghton Mifflin, 1999), pages 100–104

=== Biography, related works ===
- Grace Stone Coates: Honey Wine and Hunger Root, Lee Rostad, Falcon Press, Helena/Billings, Montana, 1985.
- Food of Gods and Starvelings, the Selected Poems of Grace Stone Coates, ed. Lee Rostad, Rick Newby, Drumlummon Institute, Helena, Montana, 2007.
- Grace Stone Coates, Her Life in Letters, Lee Rostad, Riverbend Publishing, Helena, Montana, 2004.
