= Harlowton Public Schools =

School district in Montana, United States

Harlowton Public Schools is a school district headquartered in Harlowton, Montana. It operates two schools: Hillcrest Elementary School and Harlowton High School.

In addition to Harlowton, the district includes these census-designated places: Duncan Ranch Colony, Martinsdale Colony, Shawmut, Springwater Colony, and Twodot.

Harlowton High School's team name is the Engineers.

== History ==
In 1945 there were 414 students.

In 1959 Thomas J. Corbett, previously the superintendent of the school district of Townsend, Montana, became the superintendent of Harlowton.

Previously the district required families of students who did not live in the school district to pay tuition money to the district, but by 1975 the district no longer charged tuition.
