= Lombard, Montana =

- Ghost town
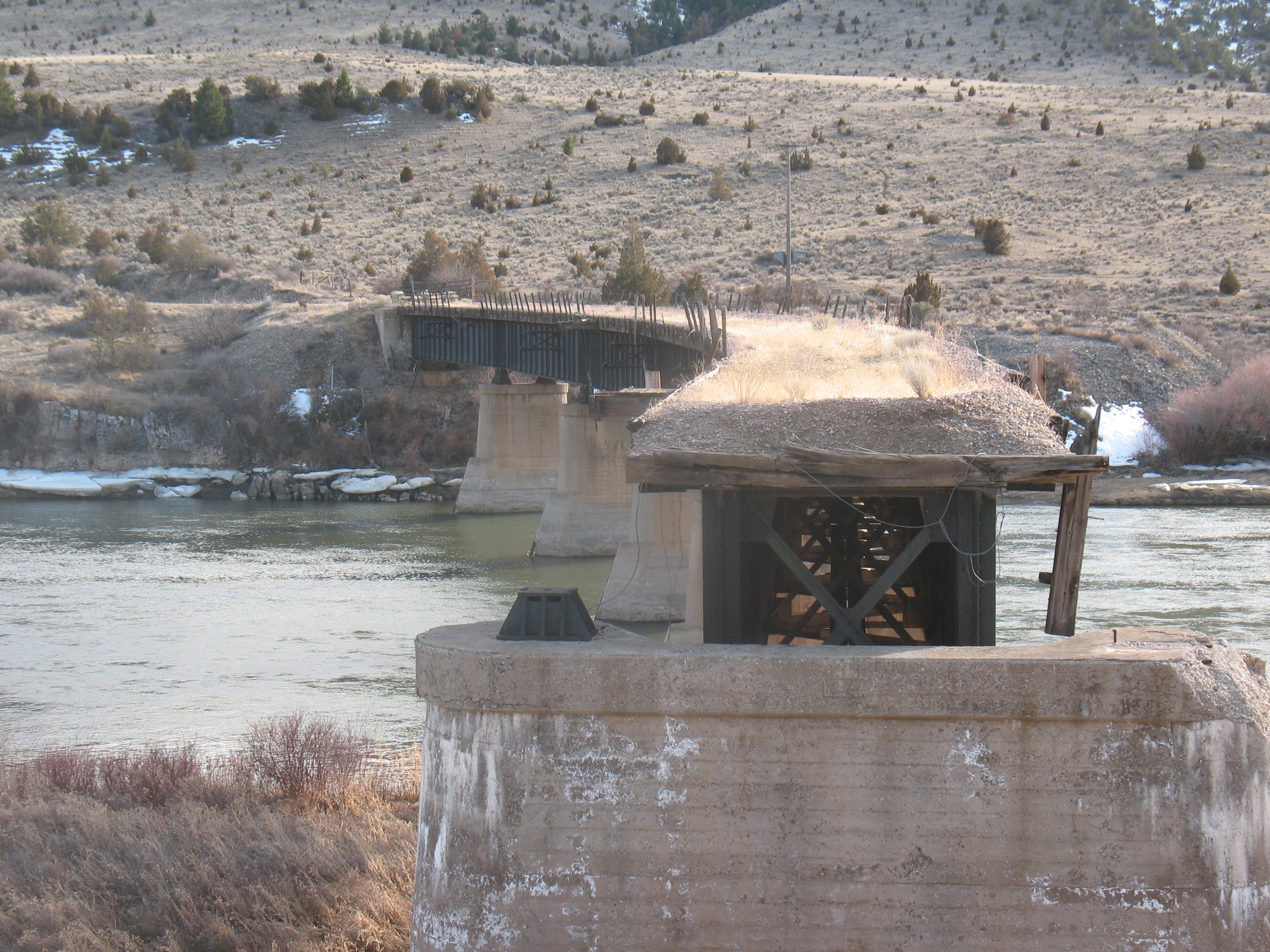
- Abandoned Milwaukee Road bridge over the Missouri River at Lombard, Montana

- Location within Montana Location within the United States
- Coordinates: 46°06′27″N 111°23′56″W
- Country: United States
- State: Montana
- County: Broadwater
- Established: 1895
- Abandoned: 1980
- Named for: A.G. Lombard
- Elevation: 3,996 ft (1,218 m)
- GNIS feature ID: 773568

Lombard is a ghost town in southeastern Broadwater County, Montana, United States. The town was located on the east bank of the Missouri River, just north of the mouth of Sixteen Mile Creek.

Lombard was established in 1895 as the western terminus of the Montana Railroad, and the location of its interchange with the Northern Pacific Railway. In 1908, the Montana Railroad was incorporated into the new transcontinental main line of the Chicago, Milwaukee, St. Paul and Pacific Railroad ("the Milwaukee Road"). This lessened Lombard's importance as a railroad operational base, but the town survived as an interchange point between the Milwaukee and the Northern Pacific.

Lombard was named for A.G. Lombard, the chief engineer of the Montana Railroad. The town's post office was first opened in 1896, and closed in 1957.

The population of Lombard declined throughout the first half of the twentieth century, corresponding with its lessening importance as a railroad town. Lombard was deserted by the time the Milwaukee Road line through the area was abandoned in 1980, and it remains a ghost town today.

Lombard represents a specific stage of technology development in the coking coal industry. The relationship of the structures and features at the site reflect the technology and methods used at an early 20th century coking establishment. Due to the short period of operation, the existing ovens were not exposed to the repeated heating and cooling to which most coke ovens were subjected, and today are still standing.

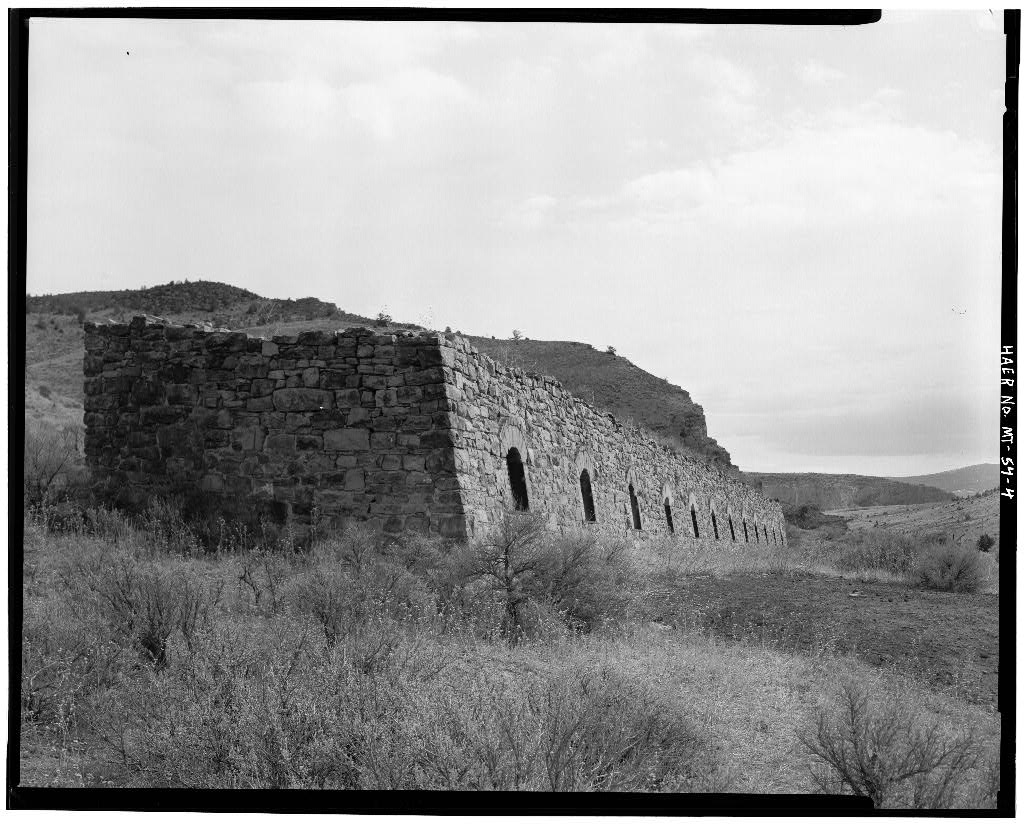
Side view of coke ovens

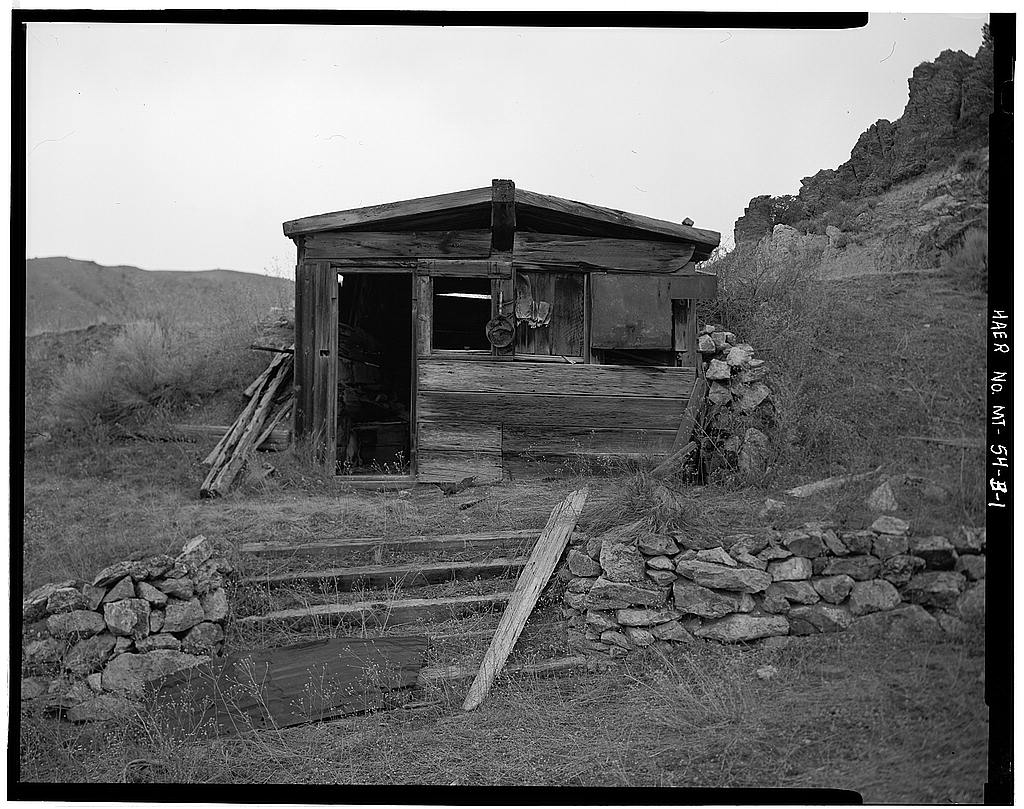
Frontal view of abandoned hut
