= Suicide Hill (Montana) =

Mountain in the U.S. state of Montana

- Location within Montana

Highest point
- Coordinates: 46°26′07″N 110°04′35″W

Geography
- Location: Wheatland County, Montana

Suicide Hill is a summit in Wheatland County, Montana, in the United States. With an elevation of 4,511 feet (1,375 m), Suicide Hill is the 2502nd highest summit in the state of Montana.
