= Gordon Butte Pumped Storage Project =

Planned energy facility in Montana, United States

Coordinates: 46.430°N 110.360°W

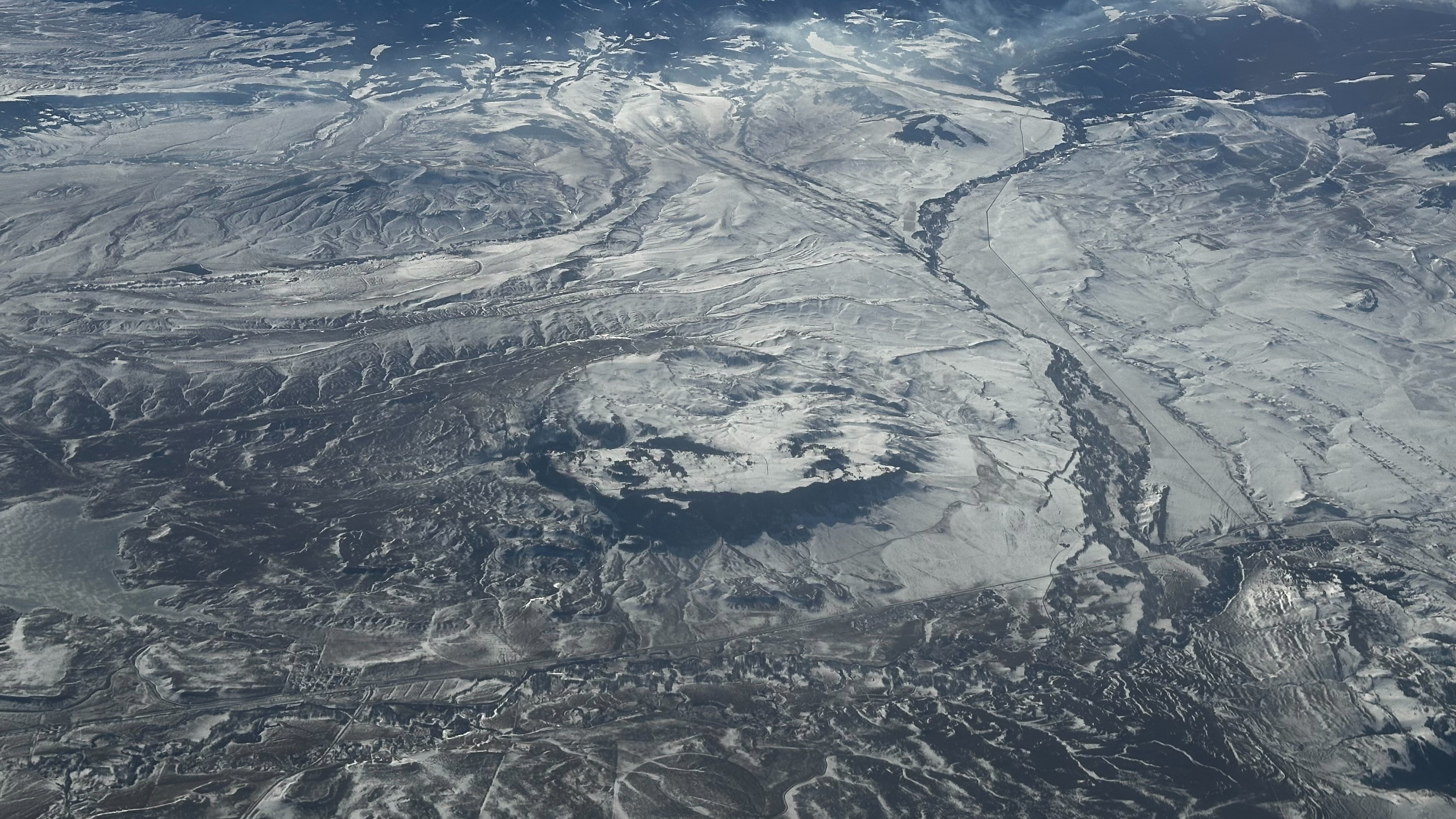
Aerial view of Gordon Butte before construction began.

The Gordon Butte Pumped Storage Project is a planned pumped hydroelectric storage facility that will be located in Martinsdale, Montana.

The facility will be owned and operated by Absaroka Energy, which submitted a license application for the project to the Federal Energy Regulatory Commission in 2015. The agency approved the request in December 2016, following a September decision of no environmental impact, granting Absaroka a 50-year license to operate Gordon Butte.

Gordon Butte will be located on a 177 acres (0.72 km^{2}) site, and will have access to water from Cottonwood Creek, a tributary of the Musselshell River. The facility will operate as a closed-loop system, without actively drawing or discharging water into the watershed. It will have a 4,000 acre-foot capacity reservoir, located 1,000 feet (300 m) above the base, with a power generation capacity of about 400 MW.

According to Absaroka, construction was planned to begin in 2018 or later, after design and engineering work is completed and financing is obtained. The construction cost is projected to be $986 million, and once in operation the annual operating cost will be $173 million to generate power with an estimated value of $220 million.

In 2019 Danish investment group Copenhagen Infrastructure Partners made a significant equity investment in the project which was thought to allow construction to begin in 2020. As of 2020, construction was estimated to begin in 2025 and be completed by 2029.
