= Sixteen Mile Creek (Montana) =

River in Montana, United States

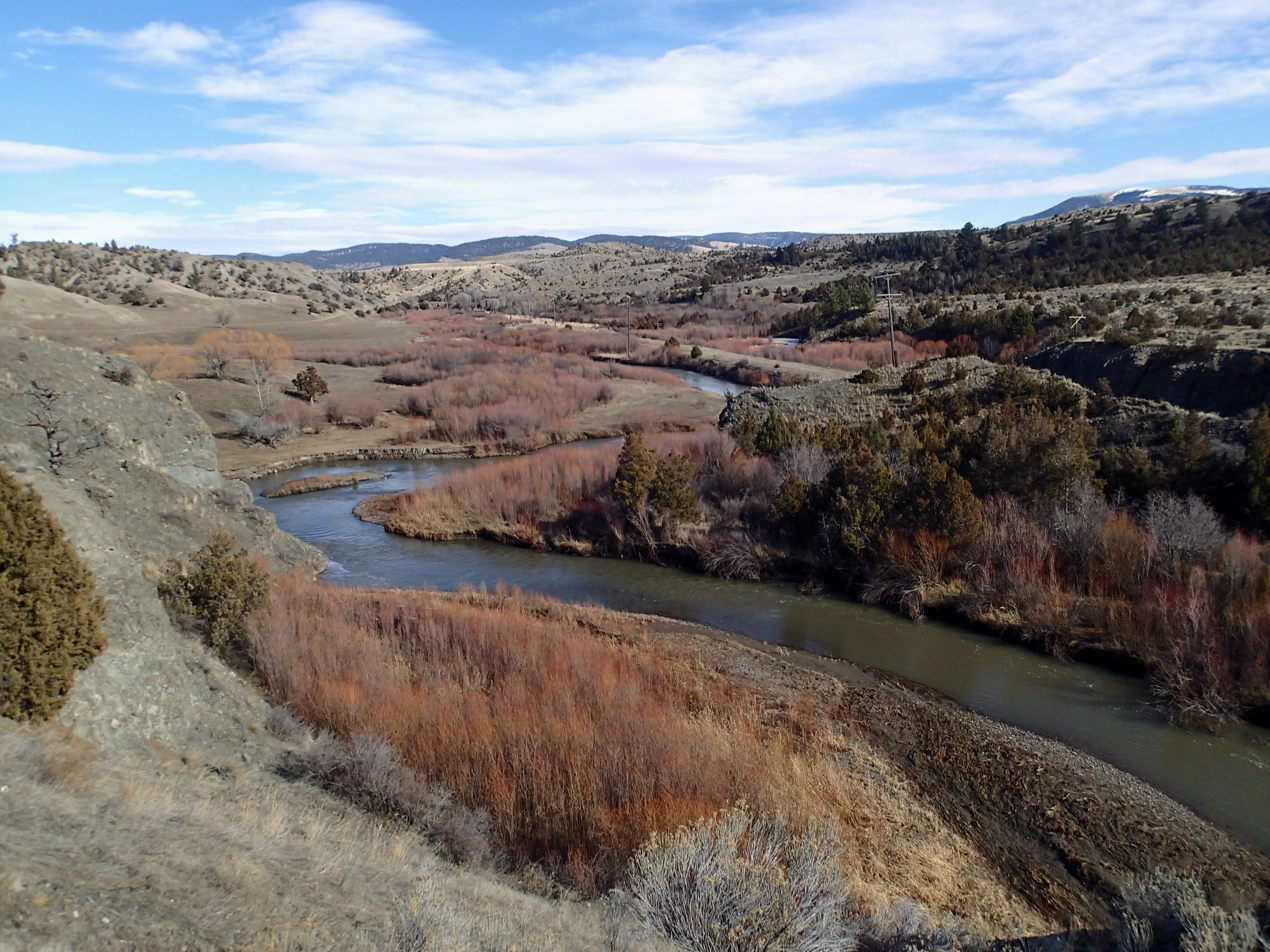
- Near Maudlow, Montana

Location
- Country: Broadwater, Gallatin and Meagher County, Montana

Physical characteristics
- Source
  - coordinates: 46°15′56″N 110°32′29″W
- Mouth
  - coordinates: 46°06′20″N 111°23′52″W
  - elevation: 3,963 feet (1,208 m)
- Length: 69 mi (111 km)

Basin features
- River system: Missouri River

Sixteen Mile Creek (also known as Sixteenmile Creek) is a 69-mile (111 km) long tributary of the Missouri River in western Montana in the United States. It forms at the confluence of the Middle and South forks of Sixteen Mile Creek, approximately 6 miles (9.7 km) east of Maudlow. The canyon through which it travels is known as "Sixteen Mile Canyon". The abandoned grade of the Chicago, Milwaukee, St. Paul and Pacific Railroad ("the Milwaukee Road") parallels the creek through the canyon; the canyon is referred to as "Montana Canyon" in Milwaukee Road promotional material.

Sixteen Mile Creek rises in the Lewis and Clark National Forest in the Crazy Mountains in southeastern Meagher County. It flows generally west, south of the Big Belt Mountains, and southwest, past Maudlow and joins the Missouri 6 miles (9.7 km) southeast of Toston, at the site of the ghost town of Lombard.

Sixteen Mile Creek is one of the more historically important areas in Montana. Its name derives from the fact that it enters the Missouri River 16 miles (26 km) downstream from Three Forks, Montana. The rail bed of the original Montana Railroad runs through this creek canyon, which includes some really outstanding scenery. The Milwaukee Road abandoned this line in 1980.

Currently there are very few areas to access Sixteen Mile Creek. Access can be achieved through Lombard, or east maudlow at a very short stretch of Gallatin National Forest land.

== See also ==
- List of rivers of Montana
- Montana Stream Access Law
