= Shawmut, Montana =

- Census-designated place
- Location within Montana
- Coordinates: 46°20′27″N 109°30′05″W
- Country: United States
- State: Montana
- County: Wheatland

Area
  - Total: 2.15 sq mi (5.56 km^{2})
  - Land: 2.15 sq mi (5.56 km^{2})
  - Water: 0 sq mi (0.00 km^{2})
- Elevation: 3,858 ft (1,176 m)

Population (2020)
  - Total: 42
  - Density: 19.6/sq mi (7.56/km^{2})
- Time zone: UTC-7 (Mountain (MST))
  - Summer (DST): UTC-6 (MDT)
- ZIP code: 59078
- Area code: 406
- GNIS feature ID: 2583845

Shawmut is a census-designated place and unincorporated community in Wheatland County, Montana, United States. As of the 2020 census, Shawmut had a population of 42. Shawmut has a post office with ZIP code 59078, which opened on October 27, 1885. The community is located along U.S. Route 12 and Montana Highway 3.

== Demographics ==
Historical population
Census	Pop.	Note	%±
2020	42		—
U.S. Decennial Census

== Education ==
It is zoned to Harlowton Public Schools.

== In Media ==
Season 1, Episode 1 of the documentary television show Neighbors aired in February 2026, featuring a dispute between neighbors Seth and Josh that takes place in Shawmut, Montana.
