= Twodot, Montana =

- Census-designated place
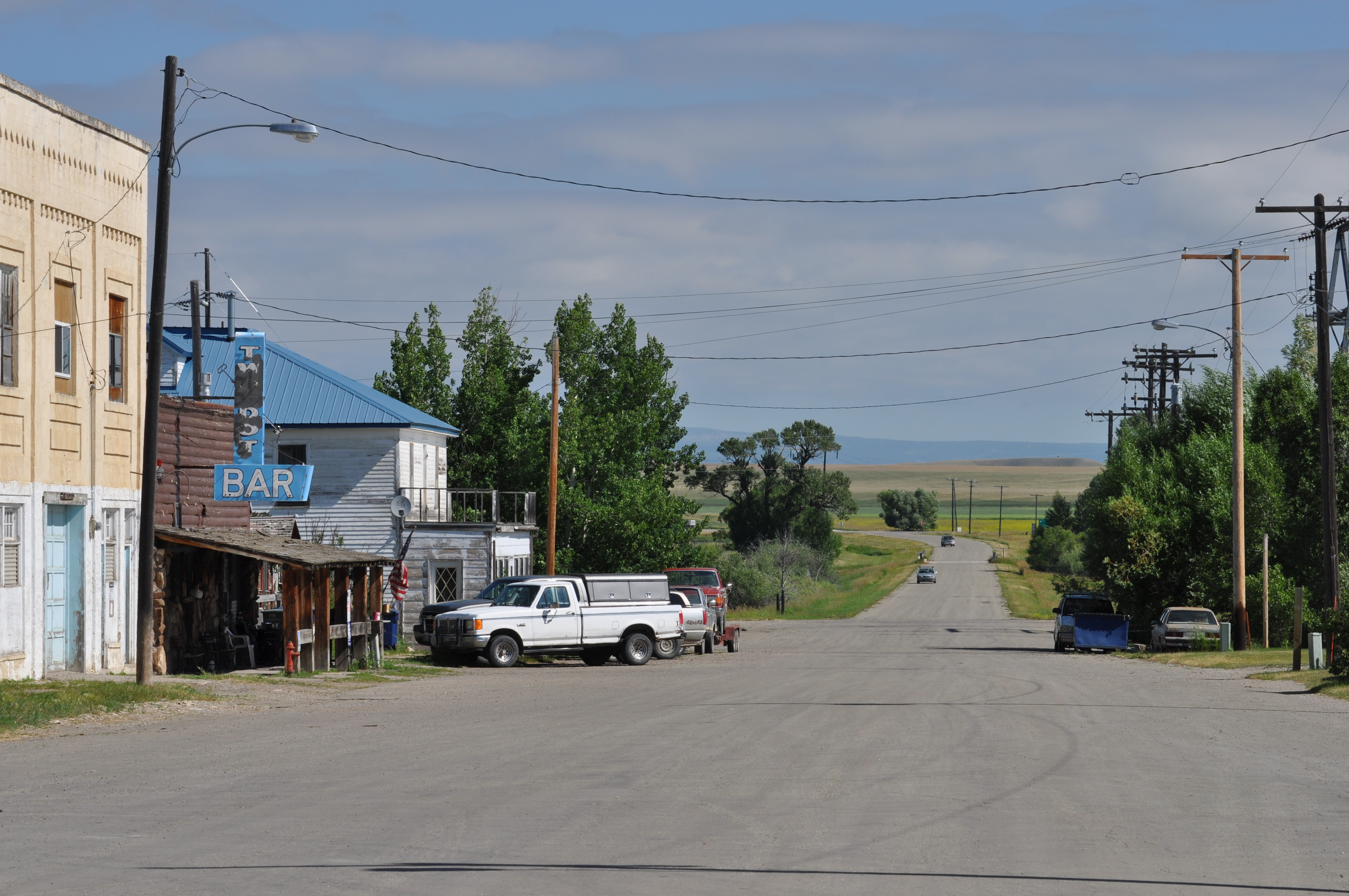
- Wilson Street in Twodot
- Nickname: Two Dot
- Interactive map of Twodot, Montana
- Coordinates: 46°25′28″N 110°04′23″W
- Country: United States
- State: Montana
- County: Wheatland
- Twodot: 1900
- Founder: George R. Wilson

Area
  - Total: 0.82 sq mi (2.12 km^{2})
  - Land: 0.82 sq mi (2.12 km^{2})
  - Water: 0 sq mi (0.00 km^{2})
- Elevation: 4,442 ft (1,354 m)

Population (2020)
  - Total: 26
  - Density: 31.7/sq mi (12.24/km^{2})
- ZIP code: 59085 (as "Two Dot")
- GNIS feature ID: 2804320

Twodot or Two Dot is a census-designated place (CDP) in west-central Wheatland County, Montana, United States, along the route of U.S. Route 12. As of the 2020 census, Twodot had a population of 26.

The town derived its name from the cattle brand of George R. Wilson (1830-1907), who donated the land for the town. "Two Dot Wilson" had a cattle brand that was simply two dots, placed side by side on the hip of his cattle. The name stuck and the town's name has become somewhat of a Western legend.

The town was a station stop on the now-abandoned transcontinental main line of the Chicago, Milwaukee, St. Paul and Pacific Railroad ("the Milwaukee Road"), and was the site of one of the substations of the railroad's electrification project. Two Dot was founded in 1900 as a station on the Montana Railroad, local predecessor to the Milwaukee Road.

For much of the town's history, two variant spellings of the town's name were in use: "Two Dot," and "Twodot". The name of the town's post office was officially changed from Twodot to Two Dot in 1999. However, when the community was listed as a census-designated place prior to the 2020 census, the U.S. Census Bureau used the name "Twodot".

== Demographics ==
Historical population
Census	Pop.	Note	%±
2020	26		—
U.S. Decennial Census

== Education ==
The community is zoned to Harlowton Public Schools.

== Popular culture ==
In 1983 Hank Williams Jr. immortalized Two Dot in his Strong Stuff album with the song "Twodot, Montana".

Images of Two Dot, Montana

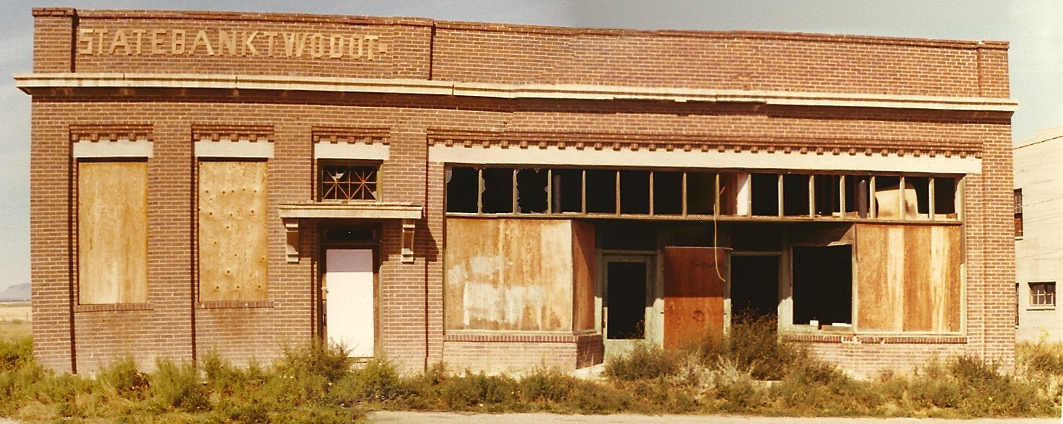
Two Dot State Bank, Aug 1977

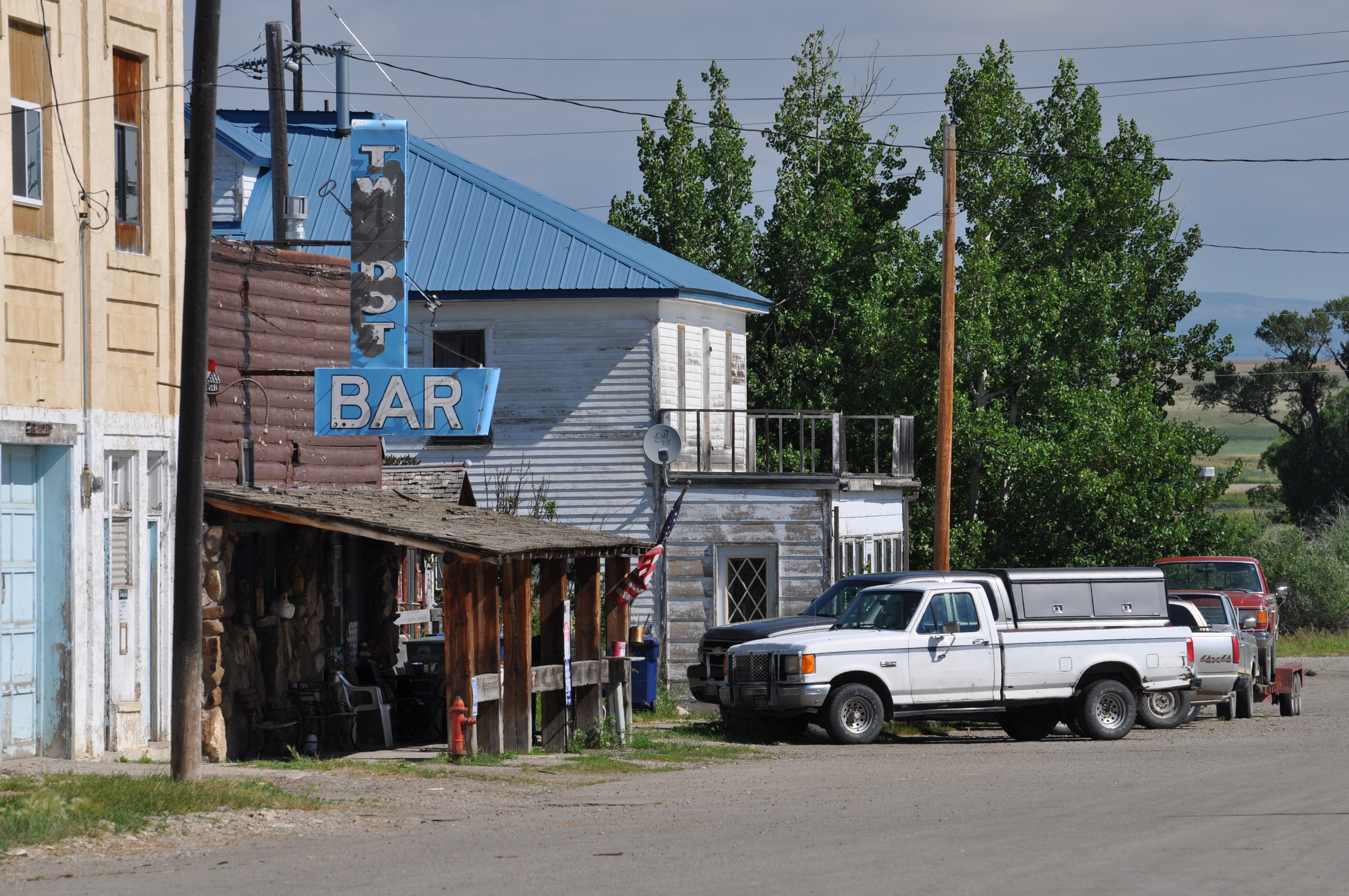
TwoDot Bar, 2011

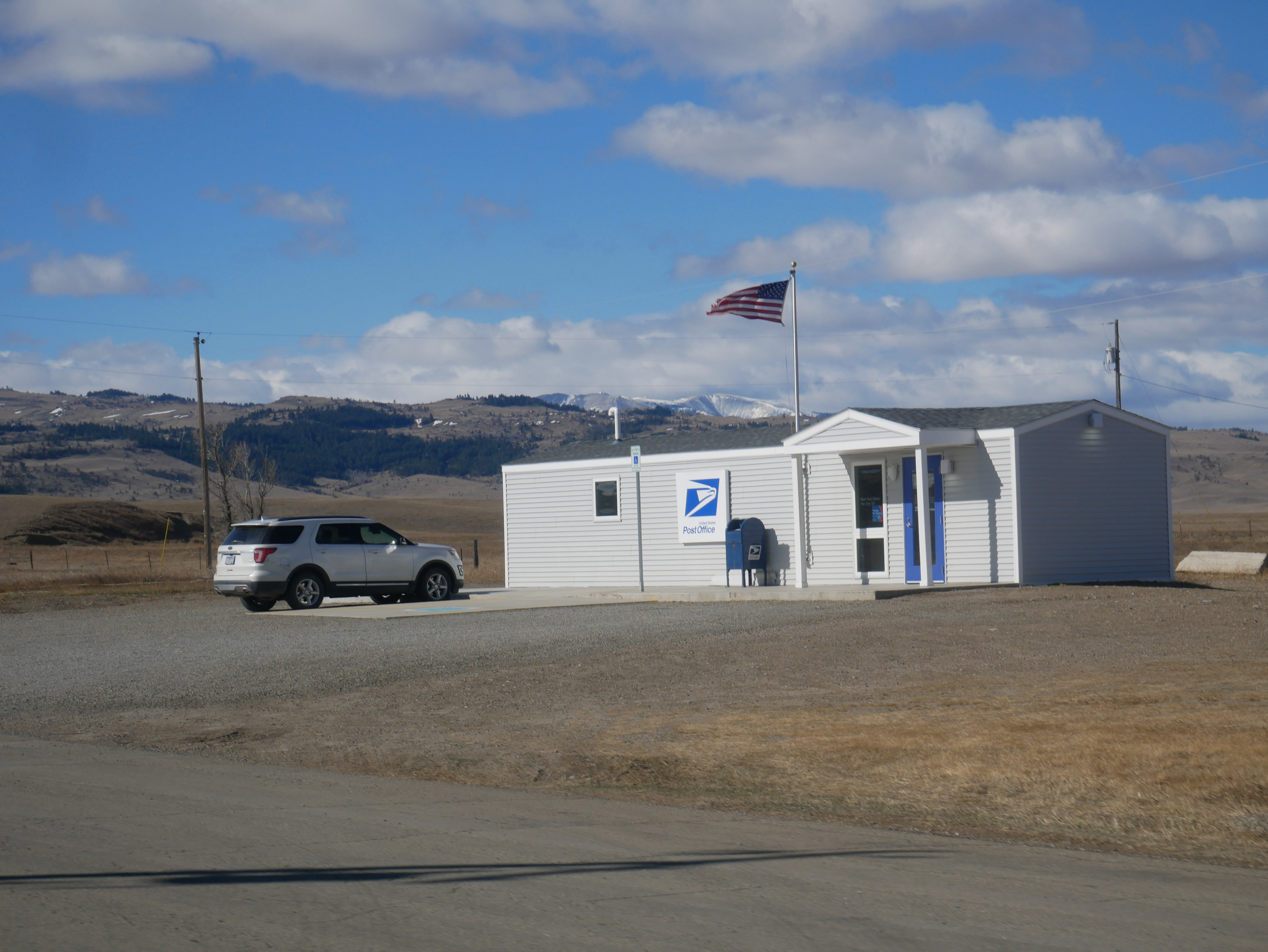
Two Dot post office, 2022

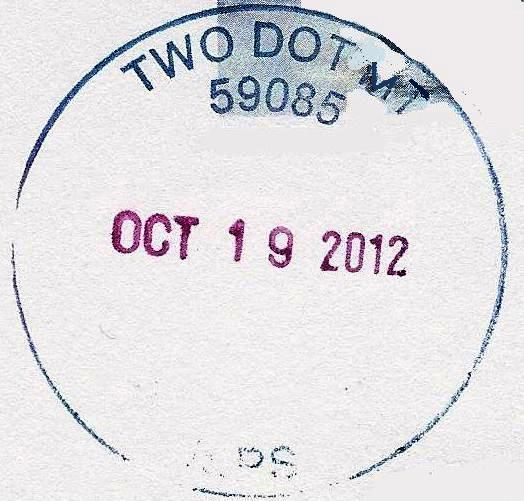
Two Dot postal cancellation

== See also ==
- List of census-designated places in Montana
