= Helen Addison Howard =

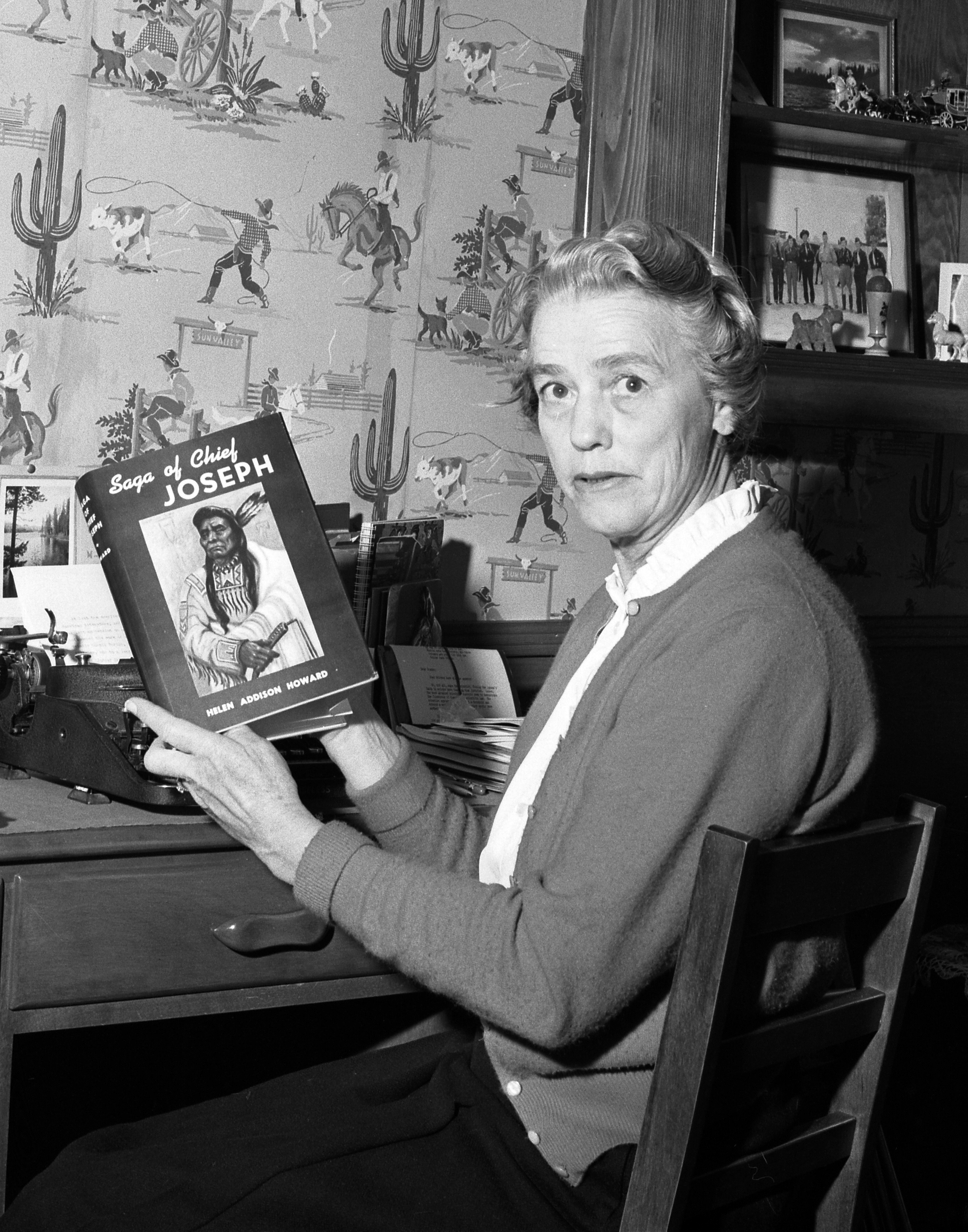
Howard holding her book Saga of Chief Joseph

Helen Addison Howard (1904–1989), also known by her married name Helen Overland, was an American writer born in Missoula, Montana\. She worked as a reporter and feature writer for the Daily Missoulian from 1923 until 1929. She earned her bachelor's degree in English from Montana State University—now the University of Montana—in 1927, and later a master's degree in English from the University of Southern California in 1933. She remained in California after graduation, and met and married Ben Overland, a Los Angeles restaurant owner, in 1946. She was a member of the Women's Ambulance and Defense Corps of America (1942-1945), did survey work for the U.S. Department of Agriculture in 1943, and clerked for the Los Angeles Police Department in 1950-1951.

While mostly recognized for her writings on Native Americans, particularly the Nez Percé, she also wrote extensively on other aspects of the frontier west. The biographical War Chief Joseph (1941) earned her much acclaim. Other notable works include Northwest Trail Blazers (1963), Saga of Chief Joseph (1965), American Indian Poetry (1979), and American Frontier Tales (1980). She also contributed to several journals, including Washington Historical Quarterly, Writer, Frontier and Midland, Historical Bulletin, Journal of the West, Pacific Northwest Quarterly, Catholic Digest, and Real West. Howard was also a book reviewer for Journal of the West beginning in 1969, and a member of its editorial advisory board in 1978.

Howard liked horses and wrote about the topic in many journals. Her articles were published in Equestrian Trails, Arabian Horse News, Horseman, Western Horseman, and Saddle Action. In recognition of her literary contributions, Howard was included in the 1989 edition of The World Who's Who of Women. She died in Burbank, California on August 2, 1989 at the age of 84.
