= Montana Railroad =

Former American railway

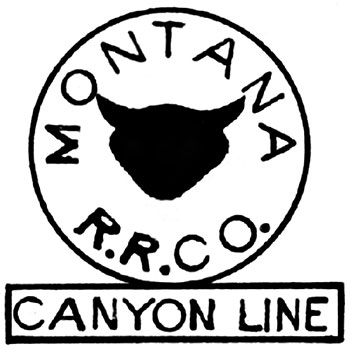
Corporate "cowshead" logo of the Montana Railroad, from an 1899 system map.

The Montana Railroad was an American railroad built and operated between the towns of Lombard and Lewistown, Montana, a distance of approximately 157 miles. The railroad connected with the national railway network via a connection with the Northern Pacific Railway at Lombard. The Montana Railroad line was constructed between 1895 and 1903, and operated independently until 1908, when it was acquired by the Chicago, Milwaukee, St. Paul and Pacific Railroad ("the Milwaukee Road"). The railroad was colloquially known as "the Jawbone", because of the contrast between the promising statements of the line's promoters and the company's perennially-weak financial position.

== History ==
The Montana Railroad was the brainchild of Richard A. Harlow, a Helena, Montana attorney and entrepreneur, who envisioned the construction of a railway eastward from Helena to serve the mining and agricultural regions of central Montana. His first attempt at such a project, the Montana Midland, began construction in 1893, but almost immediately failed due to the onset of the Panic of 1893.

Undeterred, in 1894 Harlow organized the Montana Railroad, a project with similar goals. Construction work on the Montana Railroad began in 1895 at Lombard, a station on the Northern Pacific Railway 53 miles east of Helena. The Montana Railroad route proceeded eastward from Lombard up Sixteen Mile Canyon towards the mining districts of the Castle Mountains, in southeastern Meagher County. The railroad reached Leadborough, at the southern end of the mining district, in November 1896; unfortunately for the railroad, however, the region's mines were already past their peak by then.

In the face of the declining mineral production in the Castle area, Harlow realized that his railroad needed a larger and more diversified traffic base. He therefore announced plans to extend his railroad still farther, and in 1899 railway construction crews began working eastward down the Musselshell River valley. The Montana Railroad was completed to the new town of Harlowton (named after Harlow) in 1900. The line's tracklayers then turned northward, finally reaching Lewistown in 1903.

In 1908, the Montana Railroad was purchased by the Chicago, Milwaukee, St. Paul and Pacific Railroad, which was then in the process of constructing a new transcontinental line through the state of Montana. The Lombard-Harlowton segment of the Montana Railroad became a part of this new Milwaukee line, although nearly all of the original route was heavily rebuilt, to reduce curvature and raise the Sixteen Mile Canyon trackage above the flood-prone canyon floor. Work to electrify the line began in 1914. The Montana's Harlowton-Lewistown route became a secondary main line for the Milwaukee; it was later extended to Great Falls and several branch lines were built.

Nearly all of the Milwaukee Road's trackage in the area was abandoned in 1980 due to bankruptcy, and today only a short segment of the former Montana Railroad (near Moore) remains in service. The Milwaukee Road was absorbed by the Soo Line Railroad in 1986, which was later merged into the Canadian Pacific Railway in 1990. Most of the former grade can still be seen, however.

Scenes from the line, including steam trains, are captured in the 1930 film Danger Lights. The landslide scene is said to have been recorded in 16 Mile Canyon east of Lombard. This section required heavy engineering with many bridges and tunnels but the exact location of the scene remains a mystery.
