= Milwaukee Road Historic District =

Historic district in Montana, United States

Harlowton
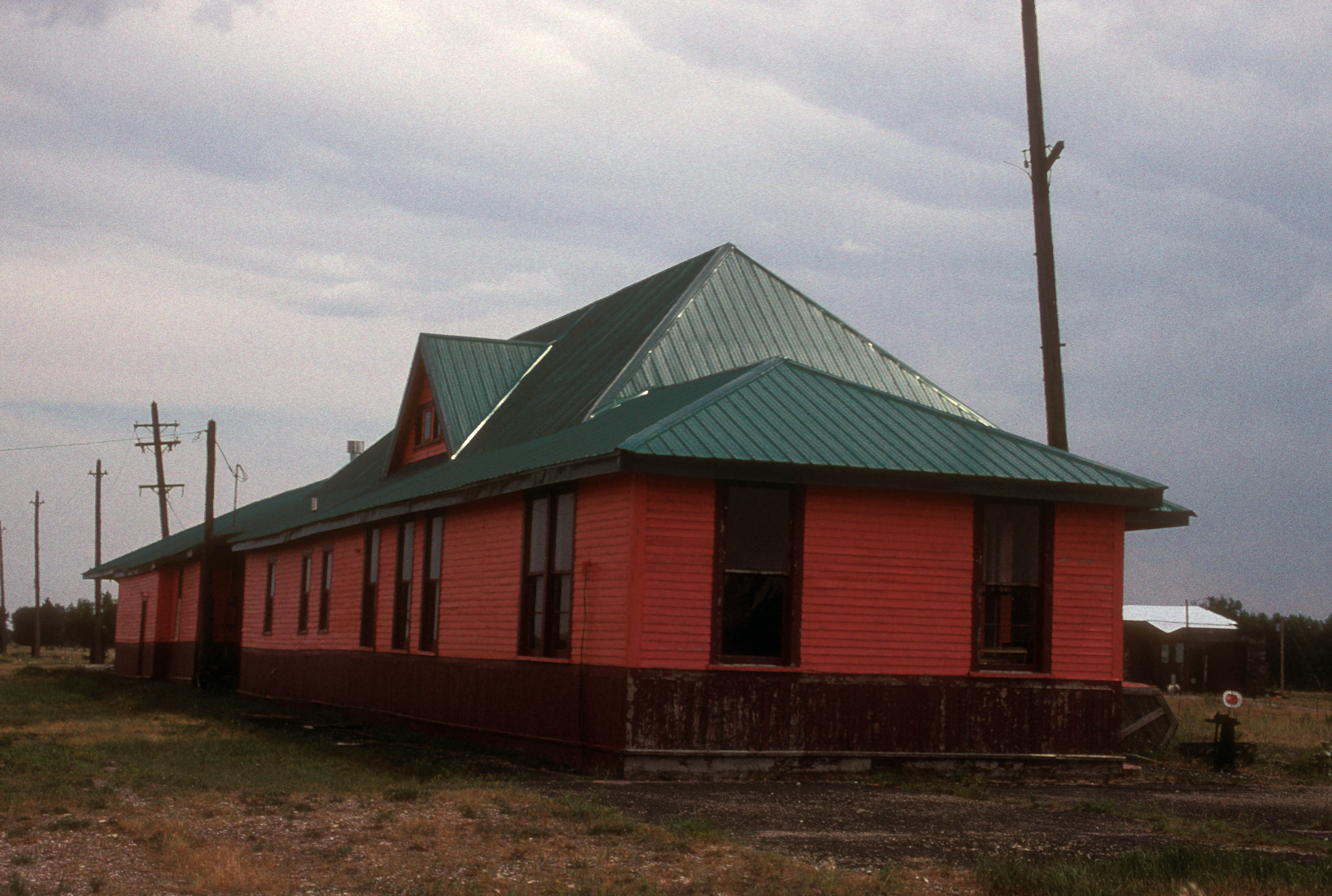
- Harlowton station in August 2007.

General information
- Location: 319 Central Avenue, Harlowton, Montana 59036
- System: Former Milwaukee Road passenger rail station

History
- Rebuilt: 1908

Services
Preceding station	Milwaukee Road	Following station
Two Dot toward Seattle or Tacoma	Main Line	Shawmut toward Chicago
Wright toward Agawam	Northern Montana Division	Terminus
- Milwaukee Road Historic District
- U.S. National Register of Historic Places
- U.S. Historic district
- Location within Montana Location within the United States
- Location: Southern end of Central Ave., Harlowton, Montana
- Coordinates: 46°25′49″N 109°49′38″W
- NRHP reference No.: 88001024
- Added to NRHP: July 8, 1988
Location

The Milwaukee Road Historic District is a historic district encompassing the Milwaukee Road railway depot and facilities in Harlowton, Montana. The depot was built in 1908, and rail service to Harlowton began the same year. In 1916, the facilities at Harlowton gained international renown when the Milwaukee Road made the depot the eastern endpoint of an electrified section of rail which extended to Avery, Idaho. The electrified section was the longest stretch of electric railroad in the United States; Thomas Edison described the railroad as an "unmatched technical marvel". Harlowton was also an important division point for the railroad, and its facilities include the railroad's standardized Class A passenger station and a rare example of an intact roundhouse. In addition to its importance to the railroad, the Harlowton rail facilities were also important to the local economy, as the railroad was the city's largest employer.

The district was added to the National Register of Historic Places on July 8, 1988.
