= Harlowton, Montana =

City in and county seat of Wheatland County, Montana, United States

Harlowton
- City
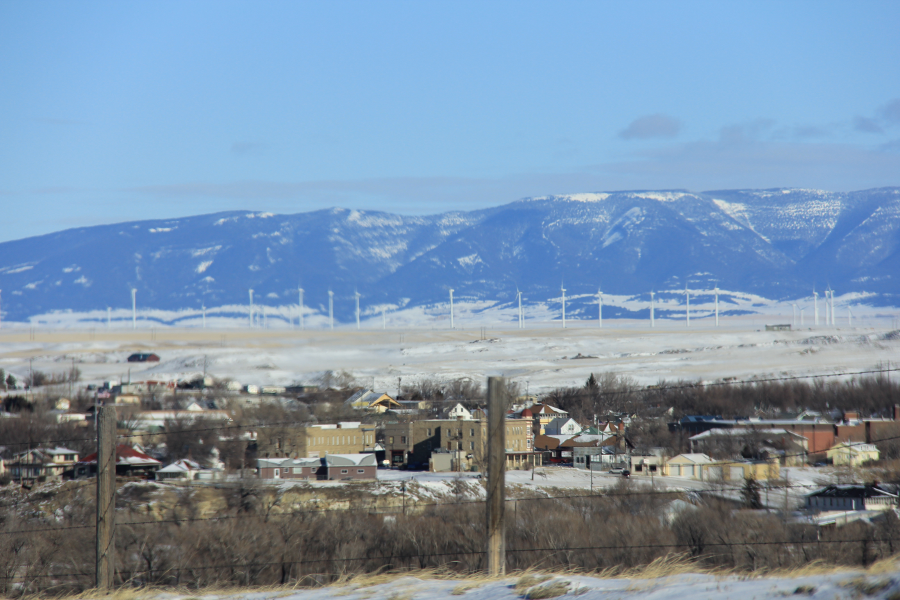
- Skyline, Harlowton, MT
- Nickname: Harlo
- Location of Harlowton, Montana
- Coordinates: 46°26′12″N 109°50′06″W
- Country: United States
- State: Montana
- County: Wheatland

Area
  - Total: 0.63 sq mi (1.62 km^{2})
  - Land: 0.63 sq mi (1.62 km^{2})
  - Water: 0 sq mi (0.00 km^{2})
- Elevation: 4,219 ft (1,286 m)

Population (2020)
  - Total: 955
  - Density: 1,526/sq mi (589.3/km^{2})
- Time zone: UTC−7 (Mountain (MST))
  - Summer (DST): UTC−6 (MDT)
- ZIP code: 59036
- Area code: 406
- FIPS code: 30-34450
- GNIS feature ID: 2410704
- Website: harlowton.municipalimpact.com

Harlowton is a city in and the county seat of Wheatland County, Montana, United States. The population was 955 at the 2020 census.

The city was once the eastern terminus of electric operations (1914–74) for the "Pacific Extension" of the Chicago, Milwaukee, St. Paul and Pacific Railroad ("Milwaukee Road"). Here, steam or diesel locomotives were changed or hooked up to electric locomotives for 438-mile (705 km) trip through the Rocky Mountains to Avery, Idaho. Harlowton was founded in 1900 as a station stop on the Montana Railroad, a predecessor to the Milwaukee, and was named for Richard A. Harlow, the Montana Railroad's president.

== History ==
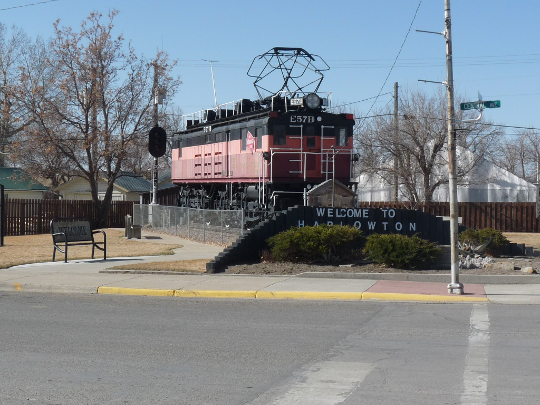
Welcome Monument -- Electric Switch Engine E57B

The Upper Musselshell River Valley is named for the Musselshell River, which got its name from the large number of freshwater mussels found in its river bed. In the fall and winter weather, the bison would migrate to the lower altitudes along the Musselshell River. Early plains hunters, taking advantage of the large bison population, frequented this area. Some of the tribes that traveled through the area were the Crow, Blackfeet, Flathead, Gros Ventre, Northern Cheyenne, Nez Perce, Shoshones, Sioux, and Assiniboine.

Harlowton lies within the Montana High Plains that form a part of the Northwestern Plains. The area is most known archeologically for the line of demarcation which was mutually established between the Crow and Blackfeet tribes that passed through the area. This fifty-mile rock line fence crossed east to west from the Big Snowy Mountains to the Crazy Mountains. The rock line hunting boundary was the cause of several battles in the area.

Within Wheatland County, site surveys have recorded and assigned archaeological site numbers to Sentinel Rock, the Fish Creek Pictograph, Owl Canyon Pictograph, Winnecook Petroglyph, Fortification site, and to several buffalo jumps in the area. The Big Snowy, Little Belt, Castle and Crazy Mountains have produced five wickiup (conical timbered lodges) sites and several pictograph sites.

On May 7, 1868, a treaty with the Crow Nation and the United States Government opened the Musselshell River Valley to settlement.

The first sheep operation on the Upper Musselshell was started by P.J. Moore in 1878. The first large cattle operation in the area was the Chicago Montana Livestock Company in 1882, with S.S. Hobson as part owner and manager.

On June 17, 1907, a fire destroyed 24 buildings on the north side of Harlowton's Main Street. The town was rebuilt, though most of the construction took place on Central Avenue to correspond with the Milwaukee Railroad plot.

The first town election was held on June 6, 1908. Mr. A. T. Anderson was elected mayor.

The grand opening of the Graves Hotel was on June 19, 1909, with a banquet and dance. Andrew Chris Graves was the principal owner. The Graves Hotel was added to the National register of historic places on August 6, 1980.

On February 22, the 1917 legislature passed an act which created Wheatland County from Meagher and Sweet Grass Counties. The act took effect on April 1, 1917. W

Wheatland was the first county in the US to go over its goal in the World War I Liberty Bond drive of 1918. County became the 41st county in Montana, and Harlowton became the county seat. For this effort, a ship, the USS Wheatland (AKA-85), was named after the county.

The 163rd Infantry Regiment is a regiment of the Montana National Guard based in Harlowton. It went overseas with the 41st Infantry Division in World War II.

The Jawbone Creek Country Club is listed in the Guinness Book of World Records for being the only golf course with a cemetery in it.

=== Merino ===
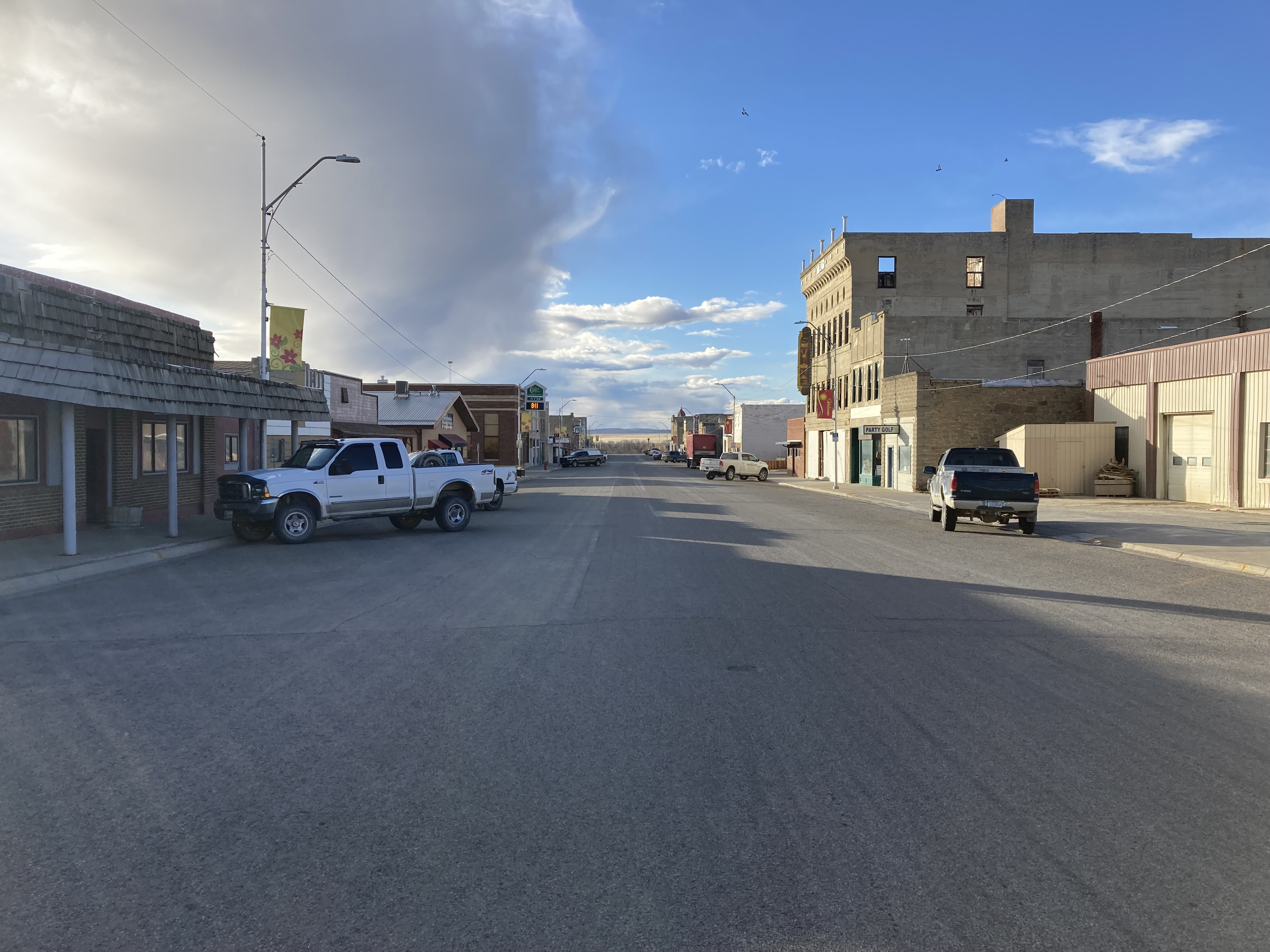
Looking down Central Ave

The town of Merino was officially established in 1881. The name Merino came from the breed of sheep that Charles Severance ran in the area at the time. The trading post owned by John and Archie McEachnie housed the post office, store and saloon. The first railroad into the area was the Montana Railroad (nicknamed the “Jawbone Railroad”) in 1899. The Montana Railroad terminal was located one mile northwest of Merino, so it was decided to relocate the town site. On June 10, 1900 Richard Harlow, father of the Montana Railroad, and Arthur Lombard, surveyor and promoter of the Montana Railroad, auctioned off lots of the new town site.

The name Merino was changed to Harlowton on November 9, 1900. The first building to be erected in the new town site was a barber shop, owned by Thomas Hanzlik.

=== Big Nose George robbery ===
In 1878, JV Salazar (Mexican John) was robbed of his horses, grub, and guns near the present site of Harlowton by the noted horse thief George Parrott (Big Nose George). At the time of the Salazar robbery, George Parrott was known to be camping on the Musselshell River with Andrew Garcia, where he was holding a bunch of stolen horses on his way to Canada. Big Nose George was later lynched at Rawlins, Wyoming.

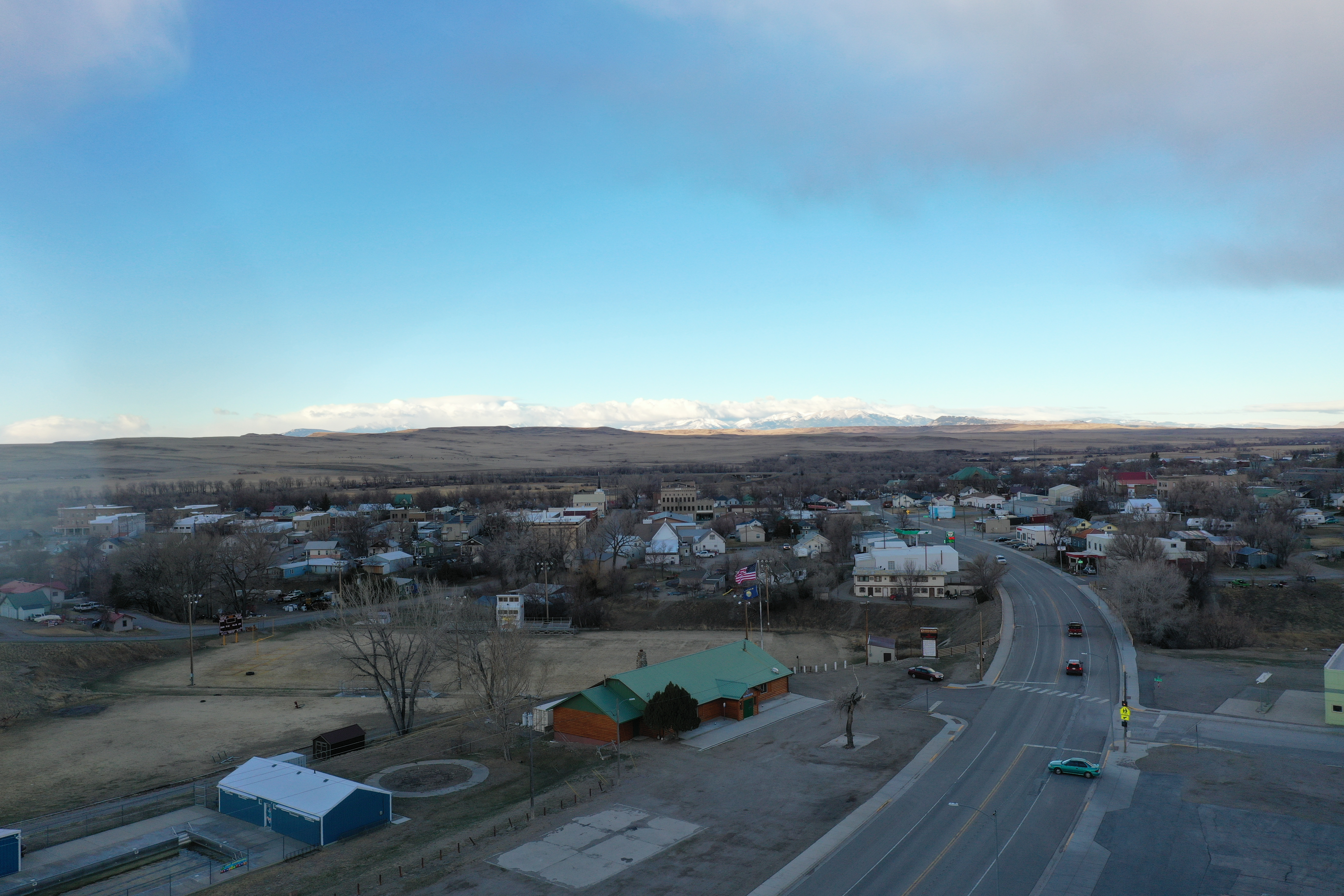
Looking west in Harlowton, Montana

=== Milwaukee Road ===
In 1906, the Chicago, Milwaukee, St. Paul and Pacific Railroad ("Milwaukee Road") started building west with its route coming though Harlowton. On December 5, 1907, work was started on the Milwaukee Railroad Roundhouse in Harlowton. The first passenger train from the east rolled into Harlowton on March 9, 1908, with freight trains to follow. In 1915 the Milwaukee Railroad was electrified from Harlowton to Avery, Idaho — over 450 mountainous miles. Harlowton became the eastern terminus of electric operations and was known as “the place where electricity replaces steam.” The Milwaukee Railroad dropped its electrified system in 1974, just months before the OPEC oil embargo of the United States. The Milwaukee Railroad was abandoned following a bankruptcy settlement and the last train that went through Harlowton was in March 1980. Milwaukee Road Historic District was listed in the National Register of Historic Places on July 8, 1988. The depot has been converted into the Harlowton Milwaukee Depot Museum.

== Paleontology ==
The town of Harlowton is located in the Fort Union Geological formation and is famous for its Paleocene fossils. In 1902 Albert Silberling, a local homesteader and self-taught paleontologist, discovered the Douglass Quarry southwest of Harlowton. Albert Silberling and Earl Douglass, a Princeton University paleontologist, discovered fossil remains of primitive mammals including the Ptilodus, Phenacodus, and Plesiadapis in the quarries southwest of Harlowton. Albert Silberling's discoveries from fossils excavated in the Harlowton area have subsidized the information about life in the Paleozoic era.

The Rugocaudia cooneyi and Tatankacephalus cooneyorum are two new dinosaur species that were found southwest of Harlowton. The Rugocaudia cooneyi is a new sauropod dinosaur that was described and named by the paleontologist Cary Woodruff in 2012. The genus name Rugocaudia means “wrinkle tail” and the species name honors the landowner J. P. Cooney. The Tatankacephalus is a new ankylosaur dinosaur species found in 1997 by Bill and Kris Parsons, research associates of the Buffalo Museum of Science.

The Avaceratops lammersi dinosaur was found on the Lammers family Careless Creek Ranch northeast of Harlowton and is the first of its kind. The Aveceratops is a small horned dinosaur that belongs to the Ceratopsidaie family. Eddie and Ava Cole discovered the fossil remains in 1981. Dr. Peter Dodson, Professor of Paleontology and Veterinary Anatomy at the University of Pennsylvania, participated in further excavation and transported the specimen to the Academy of Natural Sciences of Philadelphia. A cast of the Avaceratops lammersi is on display at the Upper Musselshell Museum in Harlowton.

== Geography ==
The town is located on the slopes of the Crazy Mountains. Other surrounding mountain ranges include the Big Snowy Mountains, Little Belt Mountains, Bull Mountains, and the Castle Mountains. It is near the Lewis and Clark National Forest.

According to the United States Census Bureau, the city has a total area of 0.58 square miles (1.50 km^{2}), all land.

=== Climate ===
According to the Köppen Climate Classification system, Harlowton has a cold semi-arid climate, abbreviated "BSk" on climate maps.

Climate data for Harlowton, Montana, 1991–2020 normals, extremes 1948–present
Month	Jan	Feb	Mar	Apr	May	Jun	Jul	Aug	Sep	Oct	Nov	Dec	Year
Record high °F (°C)	69 (21)	74 (23)	77 (25)	87 (31)	91 (33)	99 (37)	103 (39)	101 (38)	98 (37)	90 (32)	78 (26)	66 (19)	103 (39)
Mean maximum °F (°C)	55.8 (13.2)	57.4 (14.1)	65.9 (18.8)	76.4 (24.7)	82.1 (27.8)	89.8 (32.1)	95.4 (35.2)	95.0 (35.0)	90.0 (32.2)	79.9 (26.6)	65.0 (18.3)	53.8 (12.1)	97.0 (36.1)
Mean daily maximum °F (°C)	35.7 (2.1)	38.2 (3.4)	47.5 (8.6)	54.3 (12.4)	64.3 (17.9)	73.6 (23.1)	83.9 (28.8)	83.2 (28.4)	72.5 (22.5)	57.4 (14.1)	44.6 (7.0)	35.4 (1.9)	57.6 (14.2)
Daily mean °F (°C)	24.5 (−4.2)	26.2 (−3.2)	33.7 (0.9)	41.0 (5.0)	50.7 (10.4)	59.6 (15.3)	66.9 (19.4)	65.8 (18.8)	56.1 (13.4)	43.5 (6.4)	32.6 (0.3)	25.0 (−3.9)	43.8 (6.6)
Mean daily minimum °F (°C)	13.3 (−10.4)	14.1 (−9.9)	19.8 (−6.8)	27.8 (−2.3)	37.1 (2.8)	45.5 (7.5)	49.9 (9.9)	48.4 (9.1)	39.6 (4.2)	29.5 (−1.4)	20.6 (−6.3)	14.7 (−9.6)	30.0 (−1.1)
Mean minimum °F (°C)	−16.3 (−26.8)	−9.2 (−22.9)	0.6 (−17.4)	14.0 (−10.0)	22.6 (−5.2)	34.1 (1.2)	40.6 (4.8)	37.7 (3.2)	26.9 (−2.8)	11.5 (−11.4)	−3.5 (−19.7)	−11.5 (−24.2)	−23.3 (−30.7)
Record low °F (°C)	−38 (−39)	−39 (−39)	−29 (−34)	−6 (−21)	4 (−16)	24 (−4)	33 (1)	24 (−4)	10 (−12)	−8 (−22)	−29 (−34)	−39 (−39)	−39 (−39)
Average precipitation inches (mm)	0.31 (7.9)	0.30 (7.6)	0.55 (14)	1.34 (34)	2.53 (64)	2.81 (71)	1.42 (36)	1.25 (32)	1.07 (27)	0.68 (17)	0.51 (13)	0.41 (10)	13.18 (333.5)
Average snowfall inches (cm)	3.7 (9.4)	1.9 (4.8)	2.6 (6.6)	3.1 (7.9)	0.3 (0.76)	0.0 (0.0)	0.0 (0.0)	0.0 (0.0)	0.1 (0.25)	0.6 (1.5)	3.6 (9.1)	3.7 (9.4)	19.6 (49.71)
Average precipitation days (≥ 0.01 in)	3.8	3.3	4.8	8.0	9.1	10.7	8.3	6.1	4.9	4.9	3.9	3.0	70.8
Average snowy days (≥ 0.1 in)	2.9	2.3	2.3	1.5	0.1	0.0	0.0	0.0	0.1	0.4	1.9	2.5	14.0
Source 1: NOAA
Source 2: National Weather Service

== Demographics ==
Historical population
Census	Pop.	Note	%±
1910	770		—
1920	1,856		141.0%
1930	1,473		−20.6%
1940	1,547		5.0%
1950	1,733		12.0%
1960	1,734		0.1%
1970	1,375		−20.7%
1980	1,181		−14.1%
1990	1,049		−11.2%
2000	1,062		1.2%
2010	997		−6.1%
2020	955		−4.2%
U.S. Decennial Census

=== 2010 census ===
At the 2010 census, there were 997 people, 478 households and 267 families residing in the city. The population density was 1,719.0 inhabitants per square mile (663.7/km^{2}). There were 585 housing units at an average density of 1,008.6 per square mile (389.4/km^{2}). The racial makeup of the city was 95.4% White, 0.7% Native American, 0.2% Asian, 0.5% from other races, and 3.2% from two or more races. Hispanic or Latino of any race were 1.9% of the population.

There were 478 households, of which 21.3% had children under the age of 18 living with them, 43.7% were married couples living together, 8.2% had a female householder with no husband present, 4.0% had a male householder with no wife present, and 44.1% were non-families. 40.2% of all households were made up of individuals, and 19.9% had someone living alone who was 65 years of age or older. The average household size was 2.03 and the average family size was 2.71.

The median age in the city was 49.8 years. 19.3% of residents were under the age of 18; 5.9% were between the ages of 18 and 24; 19.3% were from 25 to 44; 29.2% were from 45 to 64; and 26.1% were 65 years of age or older. The gender makeup of the city was 48.5% male and 51.5% female.

=== 2000 census ===
At the 2000 census, there were 1,062 people, 496 households and 281 families residing in the city. The population density was 1,842.9 inhabitants per square mile (711.5/km^{2}). There were 599 housing units at an average density of 1,039.5 per square mile (401.4/km^{2}). The racial makeup of the city was 97.08% White, 0.75% Native American, 0.19% Asian, 0.19% from other races, and 1.79% from two or more races. Hispanic or Latino of any race were 1.98% of the population.

There were 496 households, of which 21.0% had children under the age of 18 living with them, 46.6% were married couples living together, 6.7% had a female householder with no husband present, and 43.3% were non-families. 41.3% of all households were made up of individuals, and 21.8% had someone living alone who was 65 years of age or older. The average household size was 2.07 and the average family size was 2.79.

20.9% of the population were under the age of 18, 5.3% from 18 to 24, 20.0% from 25 to 44, 26.4% from 45 to 64, and 27.5% who were 65 years of age or older. The median age was 47 years. For every 100 females there were 91.7 males. For every 100 females age 18 and over, there were 91.8 males.

The median household income was $23,636 and the median family income was $34,205. Males had a median income of $22,750 compared with $19,265 for females. The per capita income was $13,717. About 4.7% of families and 10.3% of the population were below the poverty line, including 8.0% of those under age 18 and 14.1% of those age 65 or over.

== Economy ==
Agriculture has remained a staple for the local economy. The main products are wheat, barley, oats, hay, cattle, sheep, and honey. There are many businesses supporting the agriculture industry in Harlowton; the Wheatland County Farm Service Agency, veterinary clinics, a feed store, ranch supply store, auto and mechanical shops, hardware stores, and a saddle repair shop.

Major employers are Wheatland Memorial Healthcare, Harlowton High School, Hillcrest Elementary School, Musselshell Ranger District, Midtown Market 2 Grocery Store, Rays Sport and Western Wear, Cream of the West, Rocky Mountain Cookware, TicketPrinting.com, and the Judith Gap Wind Farm.

Harlowton and Wheatland County boast an industrial business segment, with products ranging from stone to steel griddles, honey for your local pancakes to event tickets. E S Stone & Structure Incorporated and Montana Rock and Stone LLP have multiple stone quarries around the area from which an extensive line of rock and stone products are produced. Rocky Mountain Cookware manufactures die stamped steel griddles and broilers, it was established in 1992. Steve Park Apiaries provides pollination and offers a variety of beeswax and honey products. Cream of the West whole grain hot cereal was established in 1914 and its production facility was moved to Harlowton in 2002. Eventgroove is an SaaS company offering event ticketing and fundraising platforms, and online printing services for tickets and event products. The main printing facility was opened on September 11, 2001 in Harlowton. Eventgroove is the largest private employer in Wheatland County.

== Arts and culture ==
Harlowton has two museums, the Upper Musselshell Museum and Harlowton Milwaukee Depot Museum. The Upper Musselshell Museum was founded in 1984 by the Victor Fischer family. It occupies two historic buildings and is filled with rotating displays of the Upper Musselshell's history and paleontology. The Museum centerpiece is a full-size replica of the Avaceratops lammersi dinosaur, the first dinosaur found of its kind. The Upper Musselshell Museum is located along Montana's 'Dinosaur Trail' and is open from May until September.

The Milwaukee Depot Museum train depot was built in 1908, it was a "Standard Class A Passenger Station", one of several standardized depot plans used by the Milwaukee Road. The passenger Service was discontinued in 1961, and the depot and yards were abandoned by the Milwaukee in 1980. The depot was restored as a Milwaukee Railroad museum. Displays focus on the history of the town which includes a rich train history.

Harlowton Public Library serves the area.

The Rodeo, Wheatland County Youth Fair, and Harlowton Kiwanis Show are annual events that take place in Harlowton. Within 100 miles are the Nez Perce National Historic Trail, Charles M. Bair Museum, and Showdown Ski Area.

== Parks and recreation ==
The Lewis and Clark National Forest offers plenty of acreage for recreational activities; camping, sightseeing, hunting, OHV riding, snowmobiling, etc. Fishing access sites are located along the Musselshell River or at nearby Deadman's Basin or Martinsdale Reservoir.

There are three parks located within Harlowton: Chief Joseph Park, Deer Park, and Fischer Park. The old Milwaukee Railroad trackbed has been converted into the “Smoking Boomer” trail. Of special interest are the pioneer bronze sculpture (entitled And They Called the Land Montana) and the Veteran's Honor Wall located in front of the Wheatland County Court House.

== Government ==
Harlowton has a mayor and town council. The council has three wards, each with two council members. Jack Runner won the November 2025 election for mayor.

== Education ==
Harlowton Public Schools educates students from kindergarten through 12th grade. School District 16 includes the Hillcrest Elementary (K-6) and Harlowton High School (7-12). Harlowton High School's team name is the Engineers.

In 2023, Harlowton joined with Judith Gap and Ryegate to co-op for high school sports.

== Media ==
Harlowton's local newspaper is The Times Clarion. It is published weekly.

== Infrastructure ==
U.S. Route 12 passes through town from east to west. U.S. Route 191 enters town from the northeast and exits from the southwest.

Wheatland County Airport is a county-owned, public-use airport located two miles (4 km) northwest of town.

The Judith Gap Wind Farm is located north of Harlowton along US Highway 191. There are 90 wind turbines situated on 8000 acres of land that produce 135 Megawatts of power. The Judith Gap Wind farm was established in 2011 and is owned by Invenergy LLC. The power produced by this facility enters the Northwest Energy grid and is distributed where needed. Other wind farms located near Harlowton are the Musselshell Wind Project by Shawmut, the Two Dot Wind Farm by Two Dot, and Gordon Butte Wind LLC by Martinsdale.

Health facilities include Wheatland Memorial Healthcare, Deer Creek Dental, Remedies Pharmacy, Harlowton Mental Health Center, Public Health & Human Service Department, Massage Therapy, Wheatland County Senior Citizens Center, and Wheatland Memorial Nursing Home. The Wheatland Memorial Healthcare Center has a Clinic, Emergency Room, Laboratory, X-ray, and Physical Therapy Department.

== Notable people ==
- S. Stillman Berry, zoologist, died at Winnecook Ranch, near Harlowton
- Thomas Patrick Gerrity, former United States general and commander of the Air Force Logistics Command, was born here.

== See also ==
- List of municipalities in Montana
