= Northwest Energy Efficiency Alliance =

The Northwest Energy Efficiency Alliance (NEEA) is a non-profit organization working to accelerate energy efficiency in the Pacific Northwest through the acceleration and adoption of energy-efficient products, services and practices. NEEA is supported by and works in partnership with more than 140 Northwest utilities, the Bonneville Power Administration and Energy Trust of Oregon. NEEA's efforts serve Idaho, Montana, Oregon and Washington.

== History ==
In the mid-1990s, with energy efficiency programs at risk of being stranded by deregulation, the Northwest Power and Conservation Council called for the creation of a regional organization to encourage energy efficiency practices. NEEA was incorporated as a non-profit corporation in the fall of 1996 with funding from all investor-owned utilities in the region and the Bonneville Power Administration, which represented publicly owned utilities. In order to ensure the necessary collaboration would take place, the first Board represented all of the primary stakeholders including regulators from the four states, public and privately owned utilities, energy efficiency businesses, and representatives for the four state governments.

Since 1997, the region, in collaboration with NEEA, has saved enough energy to power more than 900,000 homes each year from their energy efficiency efforts.

== Funders ==
- Avista Utilities
- Bonneville Power Administration
- Cascade Natural Gas
- Clark Public Utilities
- Chelan PUD
- Cowlitz County PUD
- Energy Trust of Oregon
- Idaho Power
- NorthWestern Energy
- NW Natural
- Pacific Power
- Portland General Electric
- Puget Sound Energy
- Seattle City Light
- Snohomish County PUD
- Tacoma Power
