= Martinsdale, Montana =

- Census-designated place
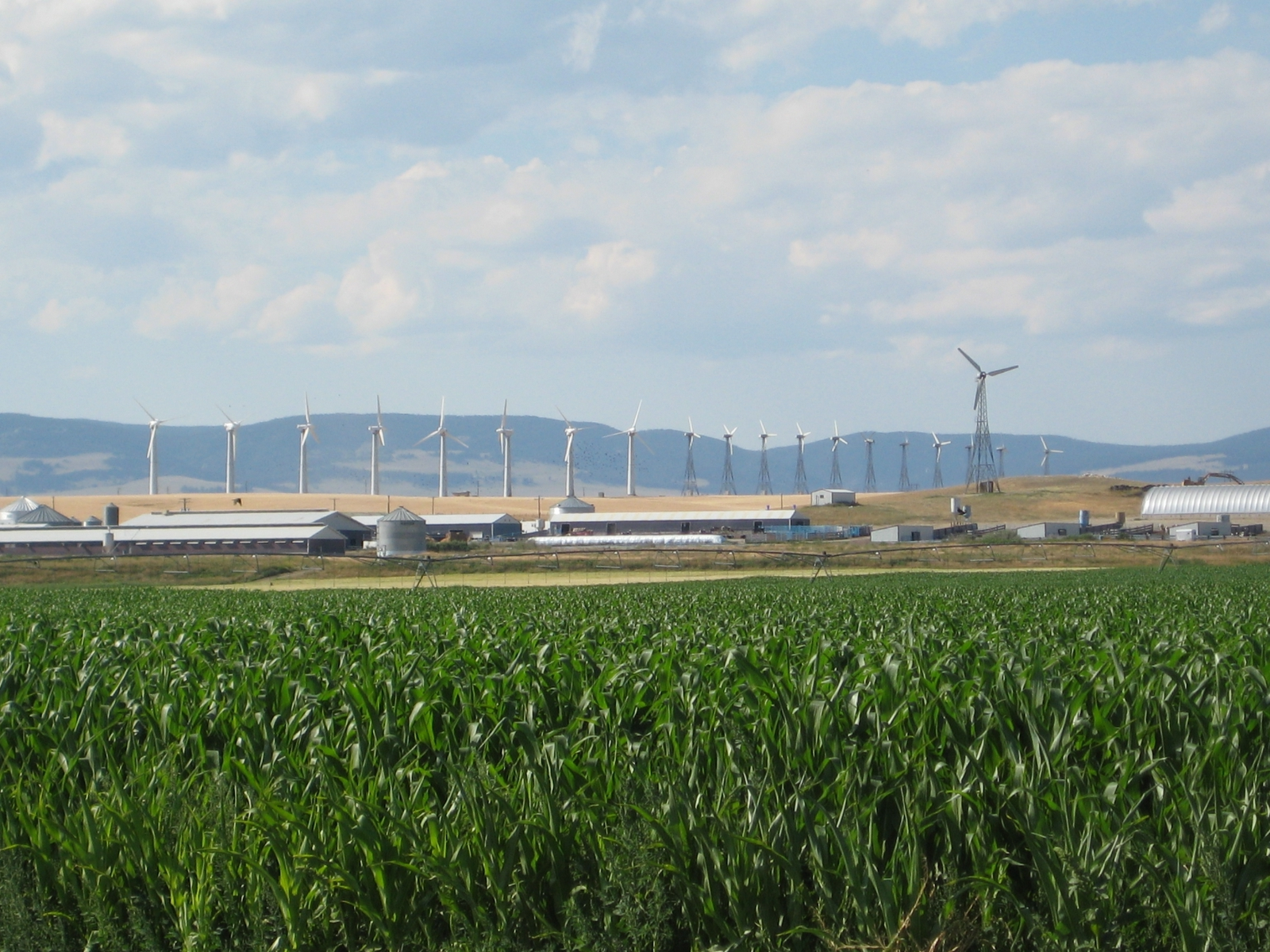
- Hutterite colony outside of Martinsdale with an array of reconditioned Nordtank wind turbines

- Location within Montana Location within the United States
- Coordinates: 46°27′17″N 110°18′43″W
- Country: United States
- State: Montana
- County: Meagher

Area
  - Total: 0.87 sq mi (2.3 km^{2})
  - Land: 0.87 sq mi (2.3 km^{2})
  - Water: 0.0 sq mi (0 km^{2})
- Elevation: 4,817 ft (1,468 m)

Population (2020)
  - Total: 43
  - Density: 49.3/sq mi (19.0/km^{2})
- ZIP Code: 59053
- FIPS code: 30-48175
- GNIS feature ID: 2583827

Martinsdale is an unincorporated community and census-designated place in southeastern Meagher County, Montana, United States. As of the 2020 census, the population was 43. The town was a station stop on the now-abandoned transcontinental main line of the Chicago, Milwaukee, St. Paul and Pacific Railroad ("the Milwaukee Road"), and is a community center for nearby ranches and farms. Martinsdale was the home of the poet Grace Stone Coates, author of Black Cherries, Mead & Mangel-Wurzel, and Portulacas in the Wheat. It was also the home of Charles M. Bair, one of the largest and most successful sheep ranchers in the United States, and the former Bair family home is now a museum.

The Gordon Butte Pumped Storage Project is a planned pumped hydroelectric power plant that will be constructed in Martinsdale.

Martinsdale is on Highway 294, just south of U.S. Route 12, and 36 miles (58 km) east of White Sulphur Springs, the Meagher county seat.

== History ==
Originally named "Gauglersville", the town changed to Martinsdale in 1878. The name was after Martin Maginnis, Montana Territory's delegate to Congress, who assisted the town in getting a post office.
