= Wheatland County, Montana =

County in Montana, United States

- County
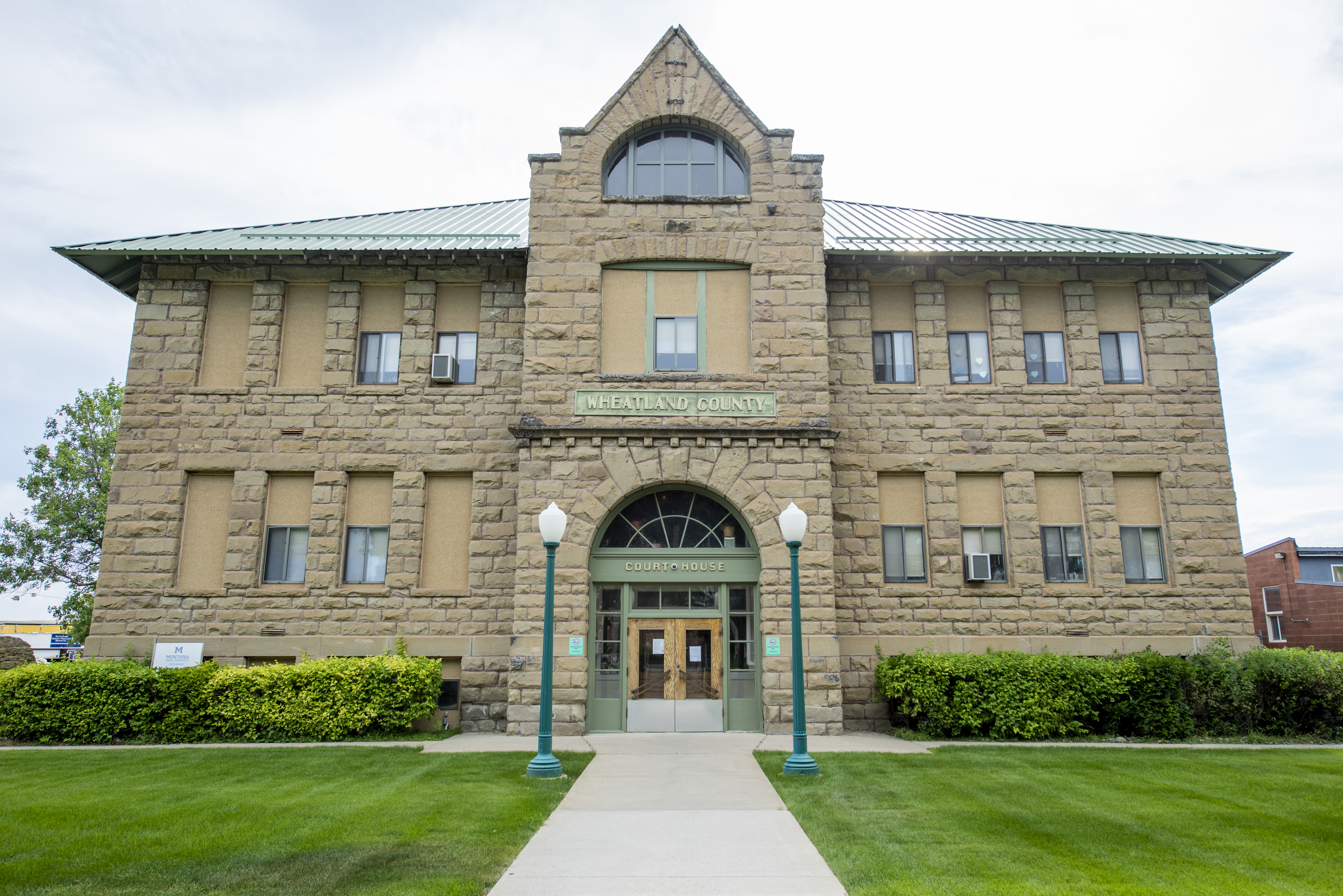
- Wheatland County Courthouse in Harlowton

- Location within the U.S. state of Montana
- Coordinates: 46°28′N 109°50′W
- Country: United States
- State: Montana
- Founded: February 22, 1917
- Named for: wheat growing
- Seat: Harlowton
- Largest city: Harlowton

Area
  - Total: 1,428 sq mi (3,700 km^{2})
  - Land: 1,423 sq mi (3,690 km^{2})
  - Water: 5.0 sq mi (13 km^{2}) 0.4%

Population (2020)
  - Total: 2,069
  - Estimate (2025): 2,100 ▲
  - Density: 1.5/sq mi (0.58/km^{2})
- Time zone: UTC−7 (Mountain)
  - Summer (DST): UTC−6 (MDT)
- Congressional district: 2nd
- Website: wheatlandcomt.gov
- Montana county number 44

Wheatland County is a county in the U.S. state of Montana. As of the 2020 census, the population was 2,069. Its county seat is Harlowton. Wheatland County was established on February 22, 1917, with areas partitioned from Meagher and Sweet Grass counties. It was named for the abundant wheat-growing areas across the center portion of the new county's area.

== Geography ==
According to the United States Census Bureau, the county has a total area of 1,428 square miles (3,700 km^{2}), of which 1,423 square miles (3,690 km^{2}) is land and 5.0 square miles (13 km^{2}) (0.4%) is water.

=== Major highways ===
- U.S. Highway 12
- U.S. Highway 191
- Montana Highway 3

=== Adjacent counties ===
- Judith Basin County - north
- Fergus County - north
- Golden Valley County - east
- Sweet Grass County - south
- Meagher County - west

=== National protected area ===
- Lewis and Clark National Forest (part)

== Demographics ==
Historical population
Census	Pop.	Note	%±
1920	5,619		—
1930	3,751		−33.2%
1940	3,286		−12.4%
1950	3,187		−3.0%
1960	3,026		−5.1%
1970	2,529		−16.4%
1980	2,359		−6.7%
1990	2,246		−4.8%
2000	2,259		0.6%
2010	2,168		−4.0%
2020	2,069		−4.6%
2025 (est.)	2,100	▲	1.5%
U.S. Decennial Census:

=== 2020 census ===
As of the 2020 census, the county had a population of 2,069. Of the residents, 22.2% were under the age of 18 and 26.1% were 65 years of age or older; the median age was 47.2 years. For every 100 females there were 102.4 males, and for every 100 females age 18 and over there were 101.2 males. 0.0% of residents lived in urban areas and 100.0% lived in rural areas.

The racial makeup of the county was 90.7% White, 0.3% Black or African American, 0.9% American Indian and Alaska Native, 0.1% Asian, 0.5% from some other race, and 7.4% from two or more races. Hispanic or Latino residents of any race comprised 3.3% of the population.

There were 799 households in the county, of which 21.3% had children under the age of 18 living with them and 23.9% had a female householder with no spouse or partner present. About 38.2% of all households were made up of individuals and 19.1% had someone living alone who was 65 years of age or older.

There were 1,114 housing units, of which 28.3% were vacant. Among occupied housing units, 69.3% were owner-occupied and 30.7% were renter-occupied. The homeowner vacancy rate was 1.5% and the rental vacancy rate was 9.4%.

=== 2010 census ===
As of the 2010 United States census, there were 2,168 people, 887 households, and 538 families in the county. The population density was 1.5 inhabitants per square mile (0.58/km^{2}). There were 1,197 housing units at an average density of 0.8 per square mile (0.31/km^{2}). The racial makeup of the county was 95.8% white, 0.6% Asian, 0.5% American Indian, 0.3% black or African American, 0.4% from other races, and 2.4% from two or more races. Those of Hispanic or Latino origin made up 1.5% of the population. In terms of ancestry, 35.2% were American, 22.7% were German, 14.1% were English, 11.5% were Irish, and 6.6% were Norwegian.

Of the 887 households, 23.7% had children under the age of 18 living with them, 50.8% were married couples living together, 6.4% had a female householder with no husband present, 39.3% were non-families, and 35.4% of all households were made up of individuals. The average household size was 2.28 and the average family size was 2.99. The median age was 44.9 years.

The median income for a household in the county was $30,321 and the median income for a family was $41,161. Males had a median income of $30,769 versus $17,083 for females. The per capita income for the county was $18,474. About 5.1% of families and 11.5% of the population were below the poverty line, including 8.8% of those under age 18 and 27.6% of those age 65 or over.

== Politics ==
Wheatland County voters have selected the Republican Party candidate in every national election since 1964 (as of 2020).

United States presidential election results for Wheatland County, Montana
Year	Republican		Democratic		Third party(ies)	
Year	No.	%	No.	%	No.	%
1920	1,250	68.79%	520	28.62%	47	2.59%
1924	723	44.22%	221	13.52%	691	42.26%
1928	1,207	68.81%	542	30.90%	5	0.29%
1932	828	45.10%	996	54.25%	12	0.65%
1936	602	36.29%	1,037	62.51%	20	1.21%
1940	786	45.12%	948	54.42%	8	0.46%
1944	767	50.59%	733	48.35%	16	1.06%
1948	780	50.88%	733	47.81%	20	1.30%
1952	1,026	63.85%	572	35.59%	9	0.56%
1956	932	61.72%	578	38.28%	0	0.00%
1960	793	52.24%	724	47.69%	1	0.07%
1964	583	42.46%	790	57.54%	0	0.00%
1968	673	51.77%	525	40.38%	102	7.85%
1972	761	57.39%	445	33.56%	120	9.05%
1976	755	57.20%	535	40.53%	30	2.27%
1980	742	60.33%	381	30.98%	107	8.70%
1984	753	64.19%	407	34.70%	13	1.11%
1988	667	59.03%	443	39.20%	20	1.77%
1992	478	41.57%	384	33.39%	288	25.04%
1996	563	51.75%	391	35.94%	134	12.32%
2000	708	70.87%	243	24.32%	48	4.80%
2004	706	72.11%	250	25.54%	23	2.35%
2008	657	66.84%	289	29.40%	37	3.76%
2012	693	69.86%	272	27.42%	27	2.72%
2016	702	74.21%	179	18.92%	65	6.87%
2020	823	77.06%	225	21.07%	20	1.87%
2024	843	77.62%	209	19.24%	34	3.13%

== Communities ==
=== Cities ===
- Harlowton (county seat)
- Judith Gap

=== Census-designated places ===
- Duncan Ranch Colony
- Martinsdale Colony
- Shawmut
- Springwater Colony
- Twodot

=== Other unincorporated communities ===
- Hedgesville
- Living Springs

== See also ==
- List of lakes in Wheatland County, Montana
- List of mountains in Wheatland County, Montana
- National Register of Historic Places listings in Wheatland County MT
