= John Hunter Thomas =

American botanist (1928–1999)

- Born: March 26, 1928; Beuthen, Germany
- Died: July 20, 1999 (aged 71); Menlo Park, California, US
- Education: Caltech (BS); Stanford University (MA, PhD)
- Known for: Floristic botany; Systematic botany; Phytogeography; Oakmead Herbarium
- Scientific career
- Fields: Botany
- Institutions: Stanford; Flathead Lake Biological Station; California Academy of Sciences
- Thesis: The vascular plants of the Santa Cruz Mountains of central California (1958)
- Doctoral advisor: Ira Loren Wiggins

John Hunter Thomas (March 26, 1928 – July 20, 1999) was an American botanist, professor of biological sciences at Stanford University, curator and director of the Dudley Herbarium, and joint curator at the California Academy of Sciences. He was known for his study of plants in the Sonoran Desert, the Santa Cruz Mountains, and the Alaska North Slope, and for his history of botanical exploration in Washington, Oregon, and California.

His doctoral research on the plants of the Santa Cruz Mountains was published as a guide to the vascular plants of coastal, central California, and was recognized as a standard reference work for regional flora. It was used for decades as teaching material for courses in systematic botany and the ecology of vascular plants at Stanford.

Thomas helped establish the Jasper Ridge Biological Preserve and was a primary contributor to what later became the Jasper Ridge Oakmead Herbarium (JROH). In total, Thomas collected more than 20,000 plant specimens for herbaria throughout his career.

== Biography ==
Thomas was born in Beuthen, Germany, (Note: In 1928, Beuthen O.S. was a Province of Upper Silesia in the Free State of Prussia in the Weimar Republic. In the post-WWII period, it was transferred to Poland after the Potsdam Conference. It is known as Bytom today.) on March 26, 1928, to American parents Roy, a mining engineer, and Lucile Thomas. He had a younger sister, Mary Louise Thomas. (Note: Mary Louise Thomas (1935-2003). Ray 1999 misspells Mary Louise's name as "Mary Louis". She was known as Mary Lou to her family and friends. Like her brother, she died from complications of dementia almost four years after John. See "Mary Thomas Obituary". The Seattle Times. November. 9, 2003.) Thomas spent his early childhood in Poland. In 1939, his family moved back to the United States, taking up residence in New England. He graduated in 1945 from Kent School in Connecticut, and earned his bachelor's degree from the Caltech in 1949.

After completing his undergraduate work at Caltech, Thomas spent the next decade as an intermittent graduate student at Stanford University (MA, 1949; PhD, 1959) broken up by active military service. His master's thesis focused on the taxonomy and distribution of the evening primrose family of flowering plants in the Sonoran Desert. In 1950, he made a preliminary identification of two species of Onagraceae. That same year, he joined Stanford botanist and faculty member Ira Loren Wiggins to study the plants in Point Barrow, Alaska. From 1951 to 1952, Thomas served as an officer in the United States Navy Reserve during the Korean War after being called to active duty. On October 7, 1951, he was wounded on the Gearing-class destroyer USS Ernest G. Small during the attack on Hungnam, North Korea. The ship hit a mine, damaging the bow, killing 9, and wounding 18. Thomas survived, but for the rest of his life he carried shrapnel embedded in his body.

From 1956 to 1958, Thomas taught at Occidental College. With Wiggins as his advisor, Thomas completed his dissertation, informed by the plant collections of William Russel Dudley, on The vascular plants of the Santa Cruz Mountains of central California in 1958, with Stanford publishing it as a book in 1961. His 1958 dissertation became a standard reference work for regional flora. It would later be used for decades as teaching materials for advanced courses in systematic botany at Stanford. Wiggins, who became director of the Naval Arctic Research Laboratory in 1950, later co-authored A Flora of the Alaskan Arctic Slope (1962) with Thomas. Between 1965 and 1969, Thomas spent his summers as a visiting associate professor at the Flathead Lake Biological Station, a year-round, ecological research and education center run by the University of Montana. From 1961 to 1969, Thomas lectured at Stanford, becoming associate professor from 1969 to 1977. He was made professor in 1977, staying there until his retirement as professor emeritus of biological sciences in 1995.

From 1961 to 1965, Thomas served as the associate editor of the American Fern Journal. He was the president of the California Botanical Society from 1975 to 1976, and previously, editor of their journal Madroño from 1963 to 1972. (Note: "1975-1976 John H. Thomas, Dudley Herbarium, Stanford University". See "Past Presidents of the California Botanical Society". As editor of Madroño, Thomas edited volumes 17, numbers 3-8 (1963-1964), 18 (1965-1966), 19 (1967-1968), 20 (1969-1970), and 21, numbers 1-4 (1971-1972). See "Madroño Editors", California Botanical Society.) Thomas participated as a delegate to the International Botanical Congress from 1964 to 1987. He was also a fellow of both the California Academy of Sciences and the Arctic Institute of North America. Thomas served on the Academic Council's Committee on Libraries and the Associates of the Stanford University Libraries, and was an editorial board member for the Stanford University Press.

== Dudley Herbarium ==
After Frederick E. Terman became Stanford university provost in 1954, there was a strong push towards biomedicine and biochemistry, particularly in terms of the potential for new federal funding available to the university for cellular and molecular biology research. Terman's administrative focus on these government grants led to the elimination of the Division of Systematic Biology in June 1965. This loss of funding paved the way for the eventual transfer and merger of the 850,000-specimen Dudley Herbarium collection from Stanford to the CAS Herbarium collection of 600,000 specimens. Thomas became associate curator of the Dudley Herbarium in 1962. Soon after, curator Roxana Stinchfield Ferris retired, leaving Thomas as curator from 1963 to 1972, becoming director of the herbarium from 1972 until 1995. In 1969, Thomas began working as a part-time joint curator at the Academy. The planned move and transfer of the specimen collections from Stanford to the Academy was eventually completed in 1976. Overall, Thomas collected more than 20,000 plants throughout his career for the Dudley Herbarium, with specimens taken from Alaska, Baja California, California, and Montana. Duplicate specimens from this collection were also deposited with the California Academy of Sciences and the California Botanic Garden (RSA-POM, Herbarium of Rancho Santa Ana Botanic Garden and Pomona College).

== Jasper Ridge Biological Preserve ==
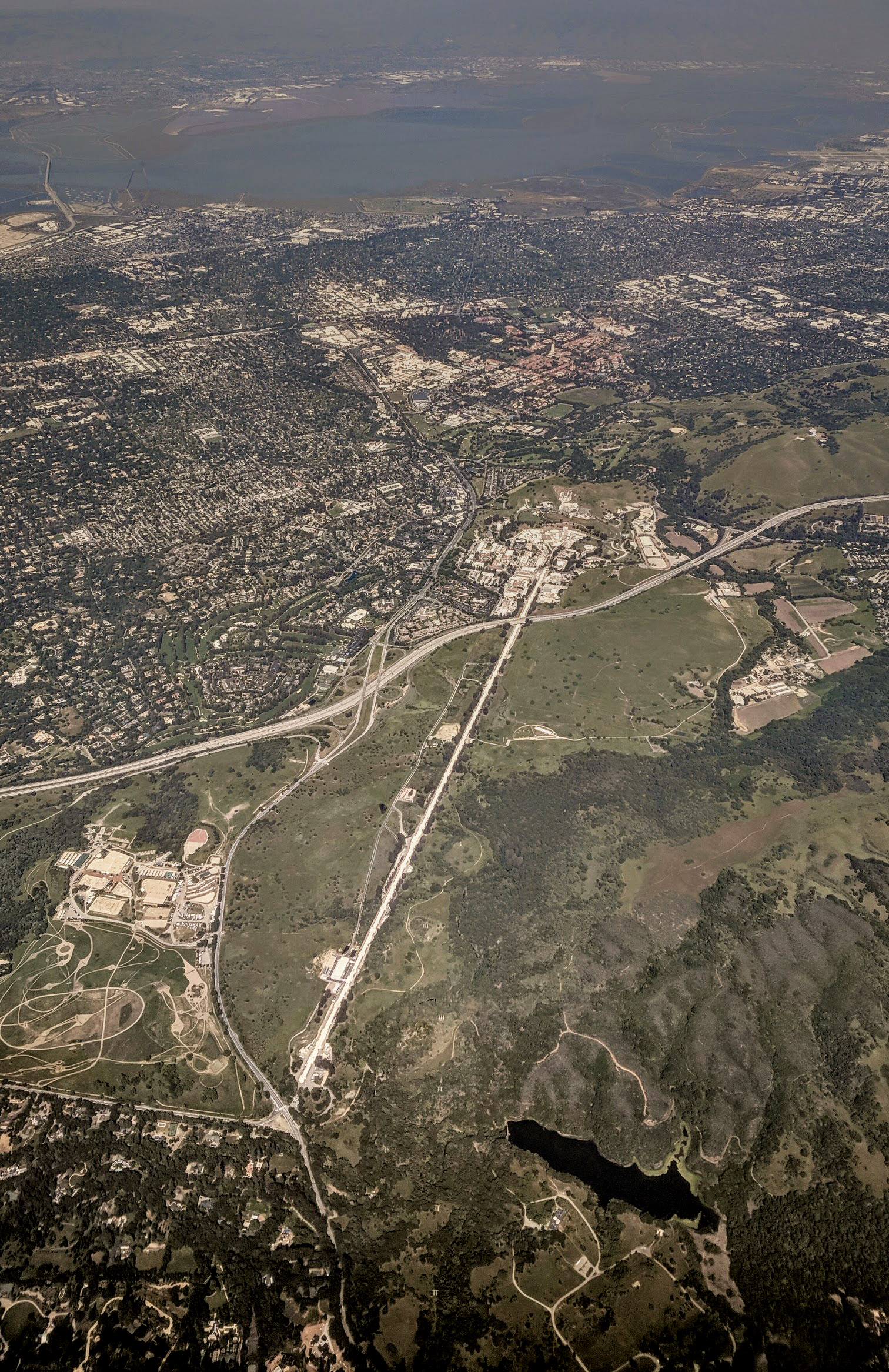
Aerial view of Jasper Ridge, lower right

In 1973, Thomas helped establish the 1,198-acre (485 ha) Jasper Ridge Biological Preserve at Stanford. The preserve, located in Portola Valley, California, contains samples of approximately 10% of the vascular plants in the state. Before Thomas began collecting in the area, there was a lack of proper voucher specimens of vascular plants. To address this problem, between 1955 and 1998, Thomas collected approximately 2,000 samples from the preserve. In 1992, he helped create the foundations for what would become the Oakmead Herbarium by giving his collection to Jasper Ridge, which he envisioned becoming a teaching and reference collection. It was eventually established in 1996, one year after his retirement.

Unlike the former Dudley Herbarium, which documented plants from the entirety of California, the Oakmead Herbarium had a much narrower focus, documenting and storing plant specimens taken from just the area of Jasper Ridge since 1867. The herbarium is located at the Leslie Shao-ming Sun Field Station, which was built in 2002 at the preserve. Along with John Rawlings and Toni Corelli, Thomas was one of the primary contributors to the plant collections at Oakmead. (Note: See Rawlings 2013, p. 18: "In 1992 John Thomas, the most prodigious collector of the preserve’s flora, estimated that it comprised about 600 species, subspecies, and varieties. At that time 400 Jasper Ridge plants were vouchered, i.e., documented by pressed specimens in organized herbaria.") The collection now hosts approximately 5,500 specimens. According to Oakmead, "Thomas was the most prolific collector of grasses in the Jasper Ridge area with 361 sheets...and the most prolific collector of graminoids in general with 453 sheets collected from 1955 to 1992".

His personal herbarium, which contained thousands of duplicate specimens, was destroyed by insects shortly before his death. In 2011, entomologists Daniel J. Bickel and Paul H. Arnaud Jr named a new long-legged fly species after Thomas (Medetera johnthomasi). Medetera is a large genus of flies in the family Dolichopodidae. "This species is named in honor of John Thomas," they wrote in their paper announcing their discovery, "who was a great supporter of the Jasper Ridge Biological Preserve and student of its flora. The species was collected in the marshes of Searsville Lake in the Preserve."

== Environmentalism ==
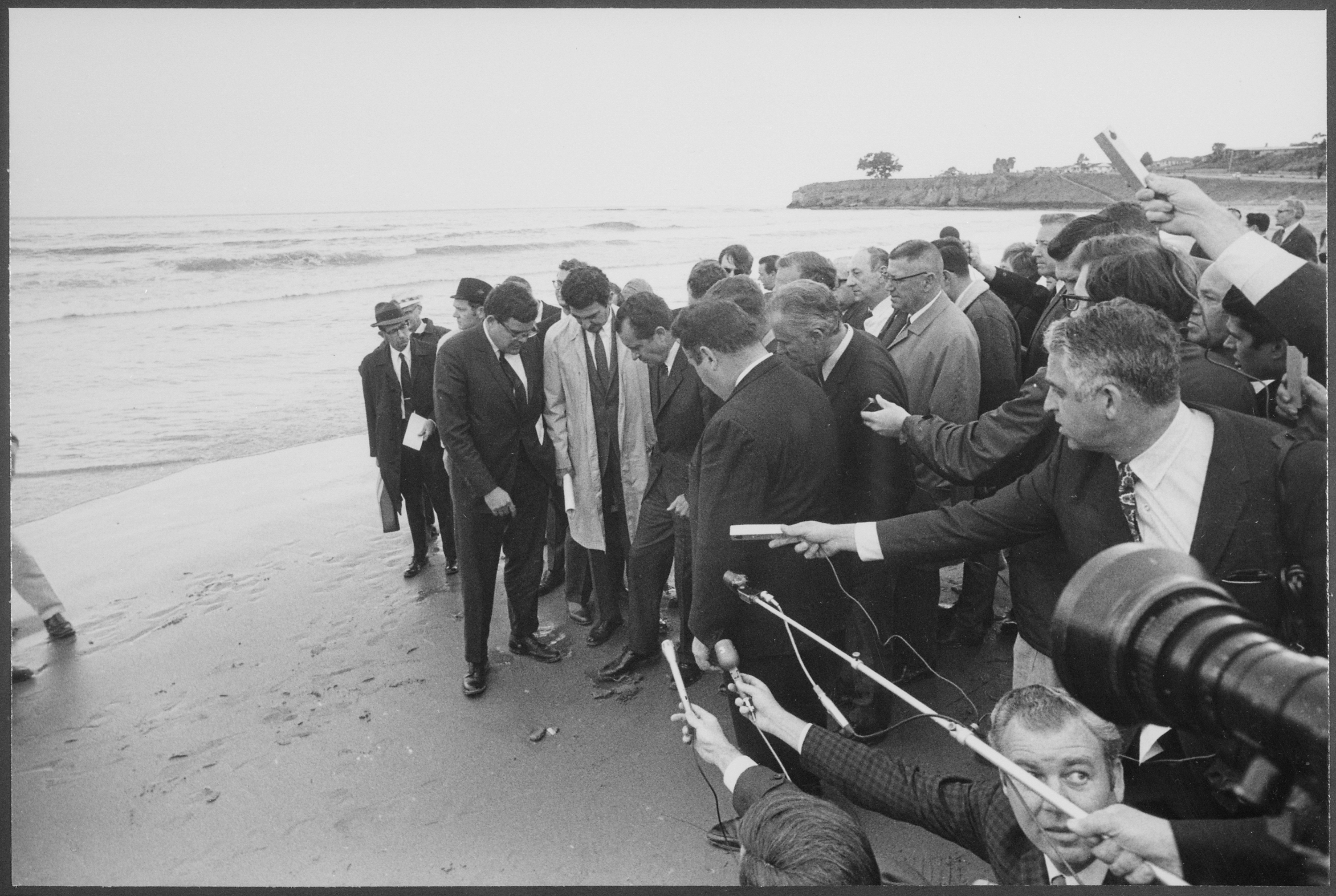
President Richard Nixon visiting the site of the 1969 Santa Barbara oil spill

During the environmental crisis of the late 1960s and early 1970s, questions about sustainable population size became part of a public debate across the United States. Thomas participated in this discussion along with other biologists and ecologists. He expressed concerns about the dangers of human overpopulation and its impact on the environment and advocated for human population planning as one way to address the problem. He gave various talks at symposia and conferences about this topic. One early talk, "The Immorality of Too Many People", was delivered at Mills College on November 15, 1969.

He also participated in the "Human Relationships in the Year 2000" symposium at Central Washington State College that brought together scientists, philosophers, religious leaders, and politicians. Along with a variety of speakers, Thomas discussed the potential threat of a growing human population, its contribution to pollution, and its role in the destruction of the environment. Thomas highlighted the activities of the oil industry in the Alaska North Slope, which he said could lead to the removal of vegetation cover which acts as an insulator, whose habitat loss could lead to the acceleration of melting permafrost. He gave another talk discussing "the interrelated problems of overpopulation and pollution" at Michigan State University on October 13, 1970, where it was recorded by WKAR Radio.

Thomas delivered the address "The Population Component of our Current Crisis" at the annual Ojai Valley School teachers' conference in March 1971. He was quoted in April of that year as saying "When we can deal adequately with the people we have now, giving everyone enough food, housing, clothing, peace, love, purpose and opportunity to achieve and fulfill themselves, we can then talk about more people and larger populations—not before."

== Personal life ==
Thomas married Susan Davidson Thomas on December 3, 1966. They had no children. Although he was of the Catholic faith, he openly criticized the anti-birth control position of the Church, particularly the position of Pope Paul VI found in the 1968 encyclical Humanae vitae, which condemned "artificial" birth control. His hobbies included reading English novels by authors like C. P. Snow and Evelyn Waugh, as well as running a printing press, which he used to publish satirical reviews of work by his peers under the title Cardboard Carton Corpse and Cadaver Container Corporation. He died in a Menlo Park nursing home from Alzheimer's disease on July 20, 1999. A memorial service was held a month later, on August 24, at Stanford Memorial Church.

== Publications ==
- Thomas, John Hunter (1949). The taxonomy and distribution of the Onagraceae of the Sonoroan Desert. (M.A. thesis). Stanford University. OCLC 25641417.
- Thomas, John H. (1950). "The genus Burragea of Lower California, Mexico." Madroño: A West American Journal of Botany. California Botanical Society. 10: 163-166.
- Thomas, John Hunter; Kenton Lee Chambers (1957). The Vascular Flora of Middleton Island, Alaska. Natural History Museum of Stanford University. 5 (2). OCLC 16900645.
- Thomas, John Hunter (1959). "Herman Knoche, 1870-1945". Contributions from the Dudley Herbarium. Natural History Museum of Stanford University. 5: 123-127.
- Thomas, John Hunter (1961). Flora of the Santa Cruz Mountains of California: A Manual of the Vascular Plants. Stanford University Press. ISBN 9780804718622. OCLC 1357629653.
- Thomas, John Hunter (May 1961). "The Gautier Herbarium". Contributions from the Dudley Herbarium. Natural History Museum of Stanford University. 5 (6): 143–145. OCLC 5066237.
- Thomas, John Hunter (May 1961). "The History of Botanical Collecting in the Santa Cruz Mountains of Central California". Contributions from the Dudley Herbarium. Natural History Museum of Stanford University. 5 (6): 147–168. OCLC 5066237.
- Wiggins, Ira L.; Thomas, John Hunter (1962). A Flora of the Alaskan Arctic Slope. Special Publication of the Arctic Institute of North America, No. 4. University of Toronto Press. OCLC 1084498.226309200
- Thomas, J. H. (1970). [Thomas lectures on the interrelated problems of overpopulation and pollution to a Michigan State University audience]. OCLC 13450879. MSU Libraries Catalog.
- Thomas, John Hunter; Parnell, Dennis R. (1974). Native Shrubs of the Sierra Nevada. University of California Press. ISBN 9780520027381. OCLC 959906.
- Thomas, John Hunter (May 1979). "Botanical Explorations in Washington, Oregon, California and Adjacent Regions". Huntia. Hunt Botanical Library, Carnegie Institute of Technology. 3 (1): 5–62. OCLC 30808725.

== Bibliography ==
- Bickel, D. J.; Arnaud, P. H. (2011). "Medetera johnthomasi (Diptera: Dolichopodidae), a new species from California with notes on the aberrans species group". Pan-Pacific Entomologist. 87 (2): 124–129. doi:10.3956/2011-09.1. S2CID 86350369.
- Chiariello, Nona (2008). "Research and Monitoring". Jasper Ridge Biological Preserve: Annual Report 2007-08. Stanford School of Humanities and Sciences. Retrieved October 13, 2023.
- Correlli, Toni; Heiple, Paul; Lambrecht, Ann; Porter, Ruth; Rawlings, John, Schwerer, Elizabeth; Zabe, Carol (June 2008). "Status of Vascular Plants". A report produced as part of the State of the Preserve assessment. Jasper Ridge Biological Preserve.
- Daniel, Thomas F. (May 16, 2008). "One Hundred and Fifty Years of Botany at the California Academy of Sciences (1853–2003)". Proceedings of the California Academy of Sciences. Series 4, 59 (7): 215–305. ISSN 0068-547X. OCLC 1289190.
- David T. Powers and Associates, Inc. (July 1991). "Draft Supplemental Environmental Impact Report". Glenwood Estates and Golf Course Development. Scotts Valley, California. Vol. I.
- Ehrlich, Paul R.; Mooney, Harold A.; Watt, Ward B. (2000). "John Thomas Memorial Resolution". Faculty Senate Session 33. Stanford University. Stanford Digital Repository. SearchWorks catalog.
- Flannery, Maura C. (2023). In the Herbarium: The Hidden World of Collecting and Preserving Plants. Yale University Press. pp. 155, 184-188. ISBN 9780300247916. OCLC 1378284722.
- Jewett, Eliza K. (2005). "Documenting Plant Diversity: Jasper Ridge's Herbarium". Jasper Ridge Biological Preserve. Stanford University. Retrieved October 6, 2023.
- Jordan, David Starr (August 4, 1911). "William Russell Dudley". Science. 34 (866): 142-145. (subscription required)
- "John Hunter Thomas, retired Stanford botanist". Community Pulse. Palo Alto Weekly. Embarcadero Publishing Company. Wednesday, August 18, 1999. ISSN 0199-1159. OCLC 5624488.
- "JROH - Jasper Ridge Biological Preserve, Stanford University (JROH)". Consortium of California Herbaria (CCH). UC Berkeley and Cal Poly, San Luis Obispo. Retrieved October 6, 2023.
- "Local Average Family Size Slightly Below National". Nevada Daily Mail. p. 7. April 26, 1971. Retrieved February 5, 2025.
- Munz, Philip A. (April 29, 1960). "The Genus Burragea (Onagraceae)." Aliso: A Journal of Systematic and Floristic Botany. 4 (3): 501-502. doi:10.5642/aliso.19600403.08.
- Museum of Natural History (1971). "Appendix D: Biographies of Members of Program Council". In Flora North America. A Comprehensive Program of Biological Research, Information Systems Development, and Data Banking Concerned with the Vascular Plants of North America North of Mexico]. Proposal to National Science Foundation. National Museum of Natural History. OCLC 63881706.
- Nemeh, Katherine H. (2008). "Biological Sciences: Botany-Phytopathology, California". American Men and Women of Science. 24th Edition. The Gale Group. ISSN 0000-1287. ISBN 9781414406558. OCLC 184991628.
- "Oakmead Herbarium: Floristic References". Jasper Ridge Biological Preserve. Stanford University. Retrieved October 6, 2023.
- "Oakmead Herbarium: Jasper Ridge Biological Preserve Order Poales". Jasper Ridge Biological Preserve. Stanford University. Retrieved October 6, 2023.
- "Obituaries". Stanford. Stanford Alumni Association. January/February 2000. ISSN 1063-2778. OCLC 25958742.
- Olds, Virginia (November 15, 1969). "Talks sobering, frightening". Ellensburg Daily Record. 69 (274): 1. Retrieved February 4, 2025.
- "Population Explosion Topic". San Francisco Chronicle. p. 23. November 14, 1969. OCLC 1178541164.
- Quinn, Charles (2006). A Nature Guide to the Southwest Tahoe Basin. CraneDance Publications. ISBN 0970889542. OCLC 70175591.
- Rawlings, John (2013). "A century and a half of plant observations". Jasper Ridge Biological Preserve: Annual Report 2012-13. Stanford School of Humanities and Sciences. p. 18. Retrieved October 13, 2023. Note: Article contains a reproduction of a herbarium voucher specimen by Thomas from 1967.
- Ray, Elaine (August 11, 1999). "Botanist John Hunter Thomas dies; memorial service 8/24". Stanford Report. Archived from the original on 2003-01-22. Retrieved October 11, 2023.
- "Susan Elizabeth Davidson Is Mrs. John H. Thomas". San Francisco Chronicle. p. 29. January 3, 1967. OCLC 1178541164.
- "Teachers' Conference Set Friday". Oxnard Press-Courier. March 11, 1971. Retrieved February 5, 2025.
- Thomas, John Hunter (May 1961). "The History of Botanical Collecting in the Santa Cruz Mountains of Central California". Contributions from the Dudley Herbarium. Natural History Museum of Stanford University. 5 (6): 147–168. OCLC 5066237.
- Timby, Sara (November 15, 1998). "The Dudley Herbarium". Sandstone & Tile. Stanford Historical Society. 22 (4): 3–15. OCLC 897580401.
- Warren, Wini (1999). Black Women Scientists in the United States. Indiana University Press. ISBN 0253336031. OCLC 42072097.
- Workman, Bill (August 11, 1999). "John Hunter Thomas". San Francisco Chronicle. Retrieved October 3, 2023. OCLC 1178541164.
