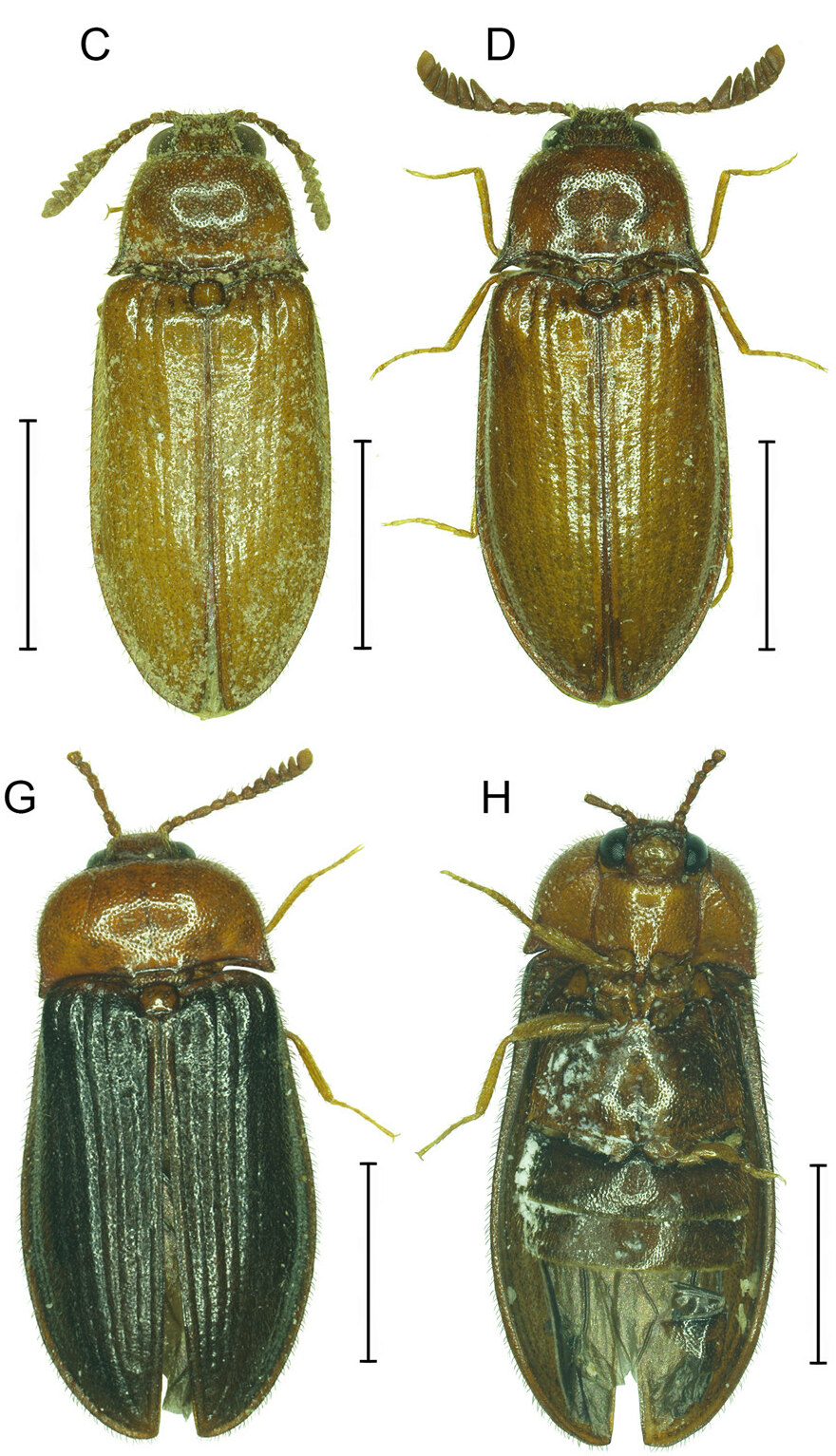
- Brachypsectra adult male (top) and female (bottom)
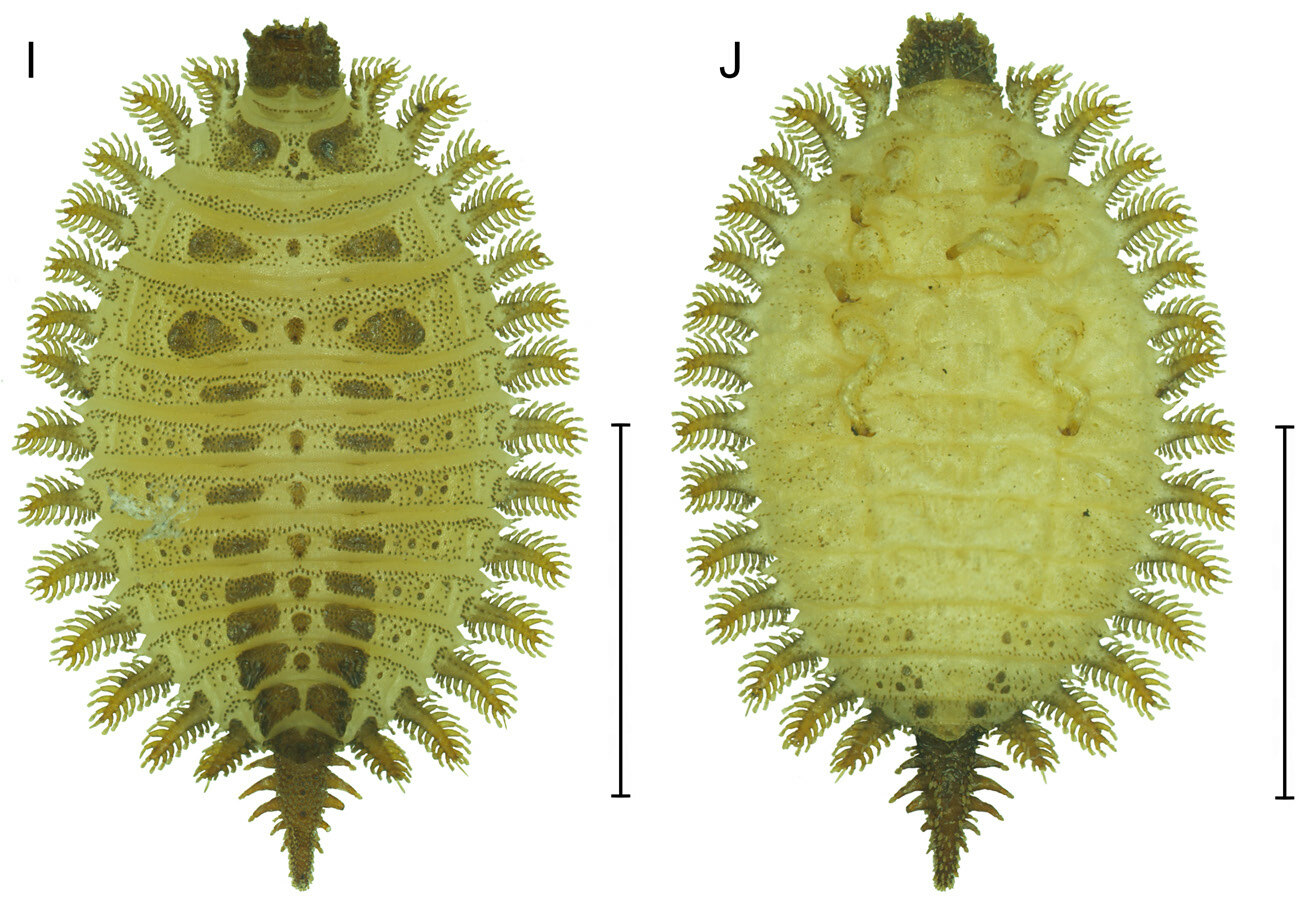
- Larva of Brachypsectra in dorsal (left) and ventral (right) views

Scientific classification
- Kingdom: Animalia
- Phylum: Arthropoda
- Clade: Pancrustacea
- Class: Insecta
- Order: Coleoptera
- Suborder: Polyphaga
- Infraorder: Elateriformia
- Superfamily: Elateroidea
- Family: Brachypsectridae; LeConte and Horn, 1883

Genera
- Asiopsectra; Brachypsectra; †Cretopsectra; †Hongipsectra; †Vetubrachypsectra

= Brachypsectridae =

Brachypsectridae Temporal range: Cenomanian–Recent

Family of beetles

The Brachypsectridae are a family of beetles commonly known as the Texas beetles. There are only two extant genera, Brachypsectra and Asiopsectra. Brachypsectra has a cosmopolitan distribution, mostly in arid regions, while Asiopsectra is found in Central Asia and the Middle East.

== Taxonomy ==
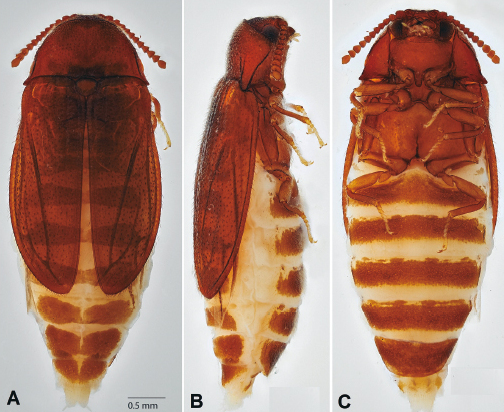
Adult female of Brachypsectra cleidecostae in various views

The family is somewhat enigmatic since the discovery and description of the first species, Brachypsectra fulva. This was originally included in the family Dascillidae, but was later placed in the new family Brachypsectridae by Horn (1881). While formerly considered monogeneric, in 2016 a new genus Asiopsectra was described from specimens found in Iran and Tajikistan. Two extinct genera, Vetubrachypsectra and Hongipsectra, known from adults, and a larval genus, Cretopsectra are known from mid Cretaceous (latest Albian-earliest Cenomanian ~ 100 million years ago) Burmese amber. A fossil species of Brachypsectra, B. moronei is known from Miocene aged Dominican amber, an unnamed larva is known from Eocene aged Baltic amber.

== Description ==
Members of this family are small (4–8 mm), flattened, relatively soft-bodied, brown or yellow beetles with large eyes. The elytra are indistinctly striated and the antennae form a club.

The larvae are distinctive being described by Gordon Floyd Ferris in 1927 and Blair in 1930 as being "entomological enigmas". They were not associated with the adult beetles until 25 years after their discovery by Barber in 1905. They are ovate and flattened and have moderately long, lateral lobes lined with elongated feathery lobules on all the thoracic segments and the first eight abdominal segments. The head and the posterior abdominal segments are relatively small and dark-coloured. The larvae are ambush predators that use their bodies to pin invertebrate prey, on which it then feeds using its sucking mandibles. Larval specimens of the Australian Brachypsectra species have been found in leaf litter and under bark. The larvae pupate inside a silken coccoon which they construct, with pupation lasting around six weeks. The adults of Brachypsectra appear to be short-lived relative to the larvae.

== Species ==
Extant species:

- Brachypsectra Le Conte 1874
  - Brachypsectra fulva LeConte (type) – North America
  - Brachypsectra fuscula Blair – Singapore
  - Brachypsectra lampyroides Blair – south India
  - Brachypsectra moronei Branham – found fossilised in amber in the Dominican Republic
  - Brachypsectra vivafosile Woodruff – Dominican Republic
  - Brachypsectra kadlec Hájek – Iran
  - Brachypsectra jaech Petrzelkova, Makris & Kundrata – Turkey
  - Brachypsectra cleidecostae Lawrence, Monteith & Reid – Australia
- Asiopsectra Kovalev and Kirejtshuk, 2016
  - Asiopsectra luculenta Kovalev and Kirejtshuk – Iran
  - Asiopsectra mirifica Kovalev and Kirejtshuk – Tajikistan
