= Aonidomytilus crookiae =

Scientific classification
- Kingdom: Animalia
- Phylum: Arthropoda
- Clade: Pancrustacea
- Class: Insecta
- Order: Hemiptera
- Suborder: Sternorrhyncha
- Family: Diaspididae
- Genus: Aonidomytilus
- Species: A. crookiae

Binomial name
- Aonidomytilus crookiae (Ferris, 1954)

Synonyms
- Aonidomytilus multiglandulatus (Kosztarab, 1963)

Species of true bug

Aonidomytilus crookiae is a species of scale insect in the family Diaspididae which are often referred to as "armored scale insects." It is commonly known as "St. John's wort scale". Originally named Nelaspis crookiae by Gordon Floyd Ferris in 1954, the taxon was moved to the genus Aonidomytilus in 1984 as the result of a 1979 taxonomic revision of the genus. Aonidomytilus multiglandulatus is a junior synonym.

The scale of the female is approximately 1/10th of an inch (2.3mm) in length, oyster shell shaped, light brown in color turning yellowish white toward the apex, with orange yellow exuviae attached apically. The body of the female insect under the scale is slender and spindle-shaped, with lobed ventral margins. Their eggs are light purple in color.

Aonidomytilus crookiae parasitizes plants in the genus Cistus in the rockrose family Cistaceae and the genus Hypericum in the family Hypericaceae including Hypericum microsepalum and H. prolificum.

The species' geographic distribution includes the U.S. states Maryland, Virginia, Georgia, Florida, Alabama, Missouri, Illinois, Indiana, and Ohio, and probably adjacent states.
