= Gymnopilus abramsii =

Scientific classification
- Kingdom: Fungi
- Division: Basidiomycota
- Class: Agaricomycetes
- Order: Agaricales
- Family: Hymenogastraceae
- Genus: Gymnopilus
- Species: G. abramsii

Binomial name
- Gymnopilus abramsii Murrill (1917)

Synonyms
- Flammula abramsii (Murrill) Sacc. & Trotter (1925)

Species of fungus

Gymnopilus abramsii
- Mycological characteristics
- Gills on hymenium
- Cap is convex
- Hymenium is adnexed or adnate
- Ecology is saprotrophic

Gymnopilus abramsii is a species of mushroom-forming fungus in the family Hymenogastraceae. It was first described by American mycologist Murrill in 1917. The epithet abramsii commemorates LeRoy Abrams.

== Description ==
The cap is 4 to 6 cm (1.6 to 2.4 in) in diameter.

== Habitat and distribution ==
Found in California, Gymnopilus abramsii grows on soil, and typically fruits in November.

== See also ==
- List of Gymnopilus species
