= Brachypsectra fulva =

Scientific classification
- Kingdom: Animalia
- Phylum: Arthropoda
- Clade: Pancrustacea
- Class: Insecta
- Order: Coleoptera
- Suborder: Polyphaga
- Infraorder: Elateriformia
- Family: Brachypsectridae
- Genus: Brachypsectra
- Species: B. fulva

Binomial name
- Brachypsectra fulva LeConte, 1883

Species of beetle

Brachypsectra fulva is a species of beetle in the Brachypsectridae family commonly known as the Texas beetle.

== Distribution ==
B. fulva occurs in Mexico and in the southern United States in the states of Arizona, California, Colorado, New Mexico, Texas and Utah.

== Description ==
This beetle has a light brown elongated oval body between four and eight millimetres long. The head is slightly wider than it is long and there are globular, protruding eyes. The antennae have ten segments, the distal six expanded on one side to form pectinate clubs, though these are less developed in the female. The prothorax is wider than it is long and widest posteriorly. The elytra have nine weakly impressed punctate striae and are broadly rounded at the posterior. The hind wings are as long as they are wide and have oblique, apically dividing, linear sclerites. The male beetle is smaller than the female and is much the same width for most of its length whereas the female is broadest in the posterior third of its length.

The larva is pale coloured, up to fifteen millimetres long, flattened and broadly ovate. The head is dark and much narrower than the prothorax. The antennae and legs are well developed. There are fairly long lateral lobes lined with elongate feathery lobules on all the thoracic segments and on the first eight abdominal segments. The upper side is armed with heavily sclerotized, scale-like setae. The posterior abdominal segments are much narrower and darker coloured and form a short tail which may be held in an elevated position.

The number of instars and the length of the life cycle are not known, but in captivity, some larvae lived for over two years without feeding. Some larvae reared by M. K. Thayer moulted twice before pupating. The cocoon was surrounded by a silken net connecting the two sides of the narrow pupation chamber. The beetle emerged after about six weeks.

== Biology ==
Though the larvae of this beetle had been known for a long time, they were described by Gordon Floyd Ferris in 1927 as an "entomological enigma". This was because it had not previously been known into what adult form they would develop.

Adult beetles are seldom seen but they are attracted by light and the males are on the wing between May and August. The larvae are found under loose bark on trees, in leaf litter and in cracks in rocks. There seems to be no association with any particular plant group but they choose habitats that are rich in insects and other arthropods. The larvae are predators that ambush their prey. They are well camouflaged and remain stationary until approached by prey. Food species include small spiders, pseudoscorpions, cockroaches, termites, and beetle larvae in the families Trogossitidae, Nitidulidae and Tenebrionidae.

In a research study, larvae in captivity were offered spiders in the genus Metepeira. They made no effort to pounce on the spiders, but when one climbed on the back of the larva, it arched its tail and head, trapping the spider between the tail spine and the mandibles. The larva then devoured the spider, at the same time relaxing its tail. In another study, several spiders were released in the presence of a single larva and they were all later found congregated on its back. The researchers thought it possible that the larva released an allomone which attracted the spiders.
