= CSKT Bison Range =

Nature reserve for bison in Montana, US

- IUCN category IV (habitat/species management area)
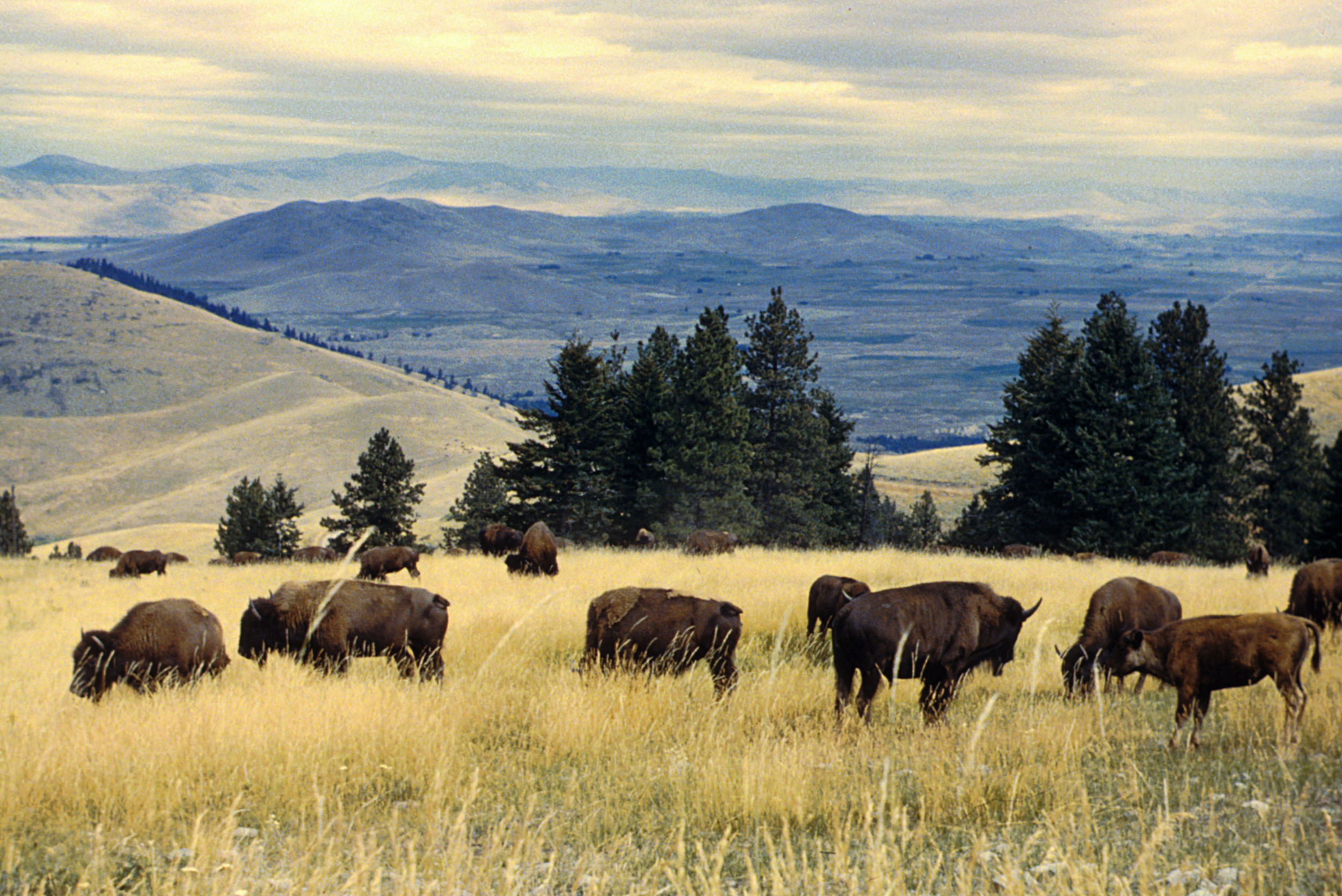

- Location within the United States Location within Montana
- Location: Lake / Sanders counties, Montana, United States
- Nearest city: Missoula, MT
- Coordinates: 47°19′30″N 114°13′33″W
- Area: 18,800 acres (76 km^{2})
- Established: 1908; 118 years ago
- Visitors: est. 250,000 (in 2004)
- Governing body: Confederated Salish and Kootenai Tribes (CSKT)
- Website: bisonrange.org

The CSKT Bison Range (BR) is a nature reserve on the Flathead Indian Reservation in western Montana established for the conservation of American bison. Formerly called the National Bison Range, the size of the bison herd at the BR is 350 adult bison and welcomes 50–60 calves per year. Established as a National Wildlife Refuge in 1908, the BR consists of approximately 18,524 acres (7,496 ha) within the Montana valley and foothill grasslands. Management of the site was transferred back to the Confederated Salish and Kootenai Tribes (CSKT) in 2022 from the U.S. Fish and Wildlife Service after more than a century of federal management and nearly two decades of negotiations.

The BR has a visitor center, and two scenic roads that allow vehicular access to prime viewing areas. The range is approximately one hour north of Missoula, Montana, off of U.S. Highway 93 directing visitors to the entrance at Moiese, Montana, and the range headquarters.

== Context ==
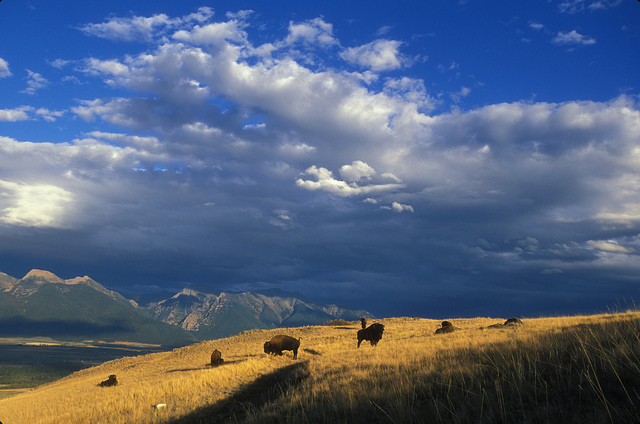
Bison now flourish from the early herd from an East Coast zoo.

The range protects one of the most endangered ecosystems in North America, the intermountain bunchgrass prairie. This diverse ecosystem includes grasslands, Douglas fir and ponderosa pine forests, riparian areas and ponds. In addition to the 350 to 500 bison, many other mammal species may be seen on the refuge, including coyote, black bear, elk, mule deer, bighorn sheep, white-tailed deer, pronghorn, mountain cottontail, Columbian ground squirrel, muskrat, yellow-pine chipmunk, badger, and cougar. Over two hundred bird species have been seen on the refuge. The Bison Range also contains many plant species, including the bitterroot, ponderosa pine, and buffalo grass.

Prior to the 1800s, bison were believed to number in the tens of millions. They were found in all the current U.S. states (except Hawaii), throughout Canada, and northern Mexico. Bison were nearly extinct by 1890, having been part of a Federal government sponsored program of eradication during the Indian Wars, thereby removing a vital food source from the Plains Indians diet, and ensuring easier relocation onto Indian reservations. Bison play an important role in Native culture which includes a deep spiritual connection.

== Early role in conservation ==
Oral accounts of the tribes recall a man of the Pend d’Oreille tribe named Atatice who knew something needed to be done as the buffalo disappeared. Atatice’s son Latati, or Little Peregrine Falcon, eventually led six orphan bison west to the Flathead Reservation. His stepfather, Samuel Walking Coyote, sold them to horse traders Michel Pablo and Charles Allard in 1884. The Pablo-Allard herd grew to about 300 when in 1896 Allard died and his half of the herd was sold to Charles E. Conrad of Kalispell by his widow. Pablo’s herd continued to grow and range wild along the Flathead River. By the early 1900s, the Pablo-Allard herd was said to be the largest collection of the bison remaining in the U.S. Pablo was notified in 1904 that the government was opening up the Flathead Reservation for settlement by selling off parcels of land. After failed negotiations with the U.S. government, Pablo sold the herd to the Canadian government in 1907. The transfer took until 1912, as the bison were captured and shipped by train from Ravalli, to Elk Island to establish a conservation herd.

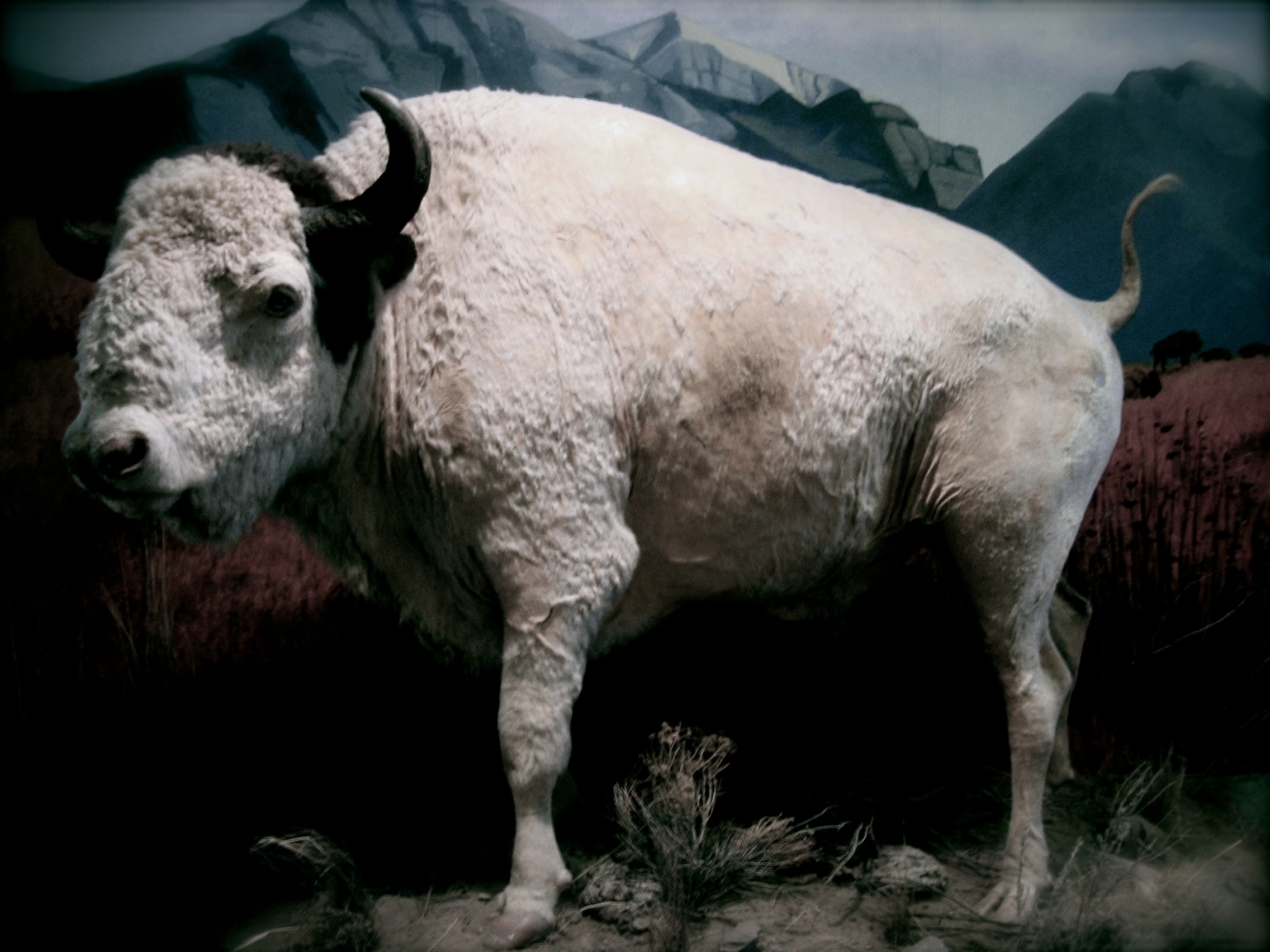
Big Medicine on display at the Montana Historical Society museum in 2005

The American Bison Society appointed Morton J. Elrod, founder of the Flathead Lake Biological Station, to examine potential reserves in Montana and he suggested the Flathead Reservation. The National Bison Range was established on May 23, 1908 out of a portion of the Reservation. President Theodore Roosevelt signed legislation authorizing funds to purchase land for bison conservation when for the first time Congress appropriated tax dollars to buy land specifically to preserve wildlife. The initial herd of thirty-four American bison were purchased from the Conrad herd by the American Bison Society in 1909. To supplement this, Alicia Conrad added two of her finest animals to the effort. The Refuge also received one bison from Charles Goodnight of Texas and three from the Corbin herd in New Hampshire. The Range was established as a native bird refuge by Congress in 1921. The Civilian Conservation Corps built many of its buildings. A white buffalo, "Big Medicine" (1933–1959), spent his life at the Bison Range. Tribal members visited him to pray and held him in high esteem. In the early 1950s the Montana Historical Society made arrangements to move Big Medicine upon his death to the state's museum to be permanently preserved and displayed. As Indigenous artifacts and culturally significant items are being repatriated by many institutions to tribes, the Montana Historical Society and the state of Montana have committed to transferring ownership to the tribe. The tribe has long desired the return due to the spiritual significance and want to prepare the appropriate infrastructure at the range.

== Tribal management ==
Returning the range to tribal control has been desired by members since it was taken over by the federal government without the tribes' consent in 1908. In accordance with the 1994 Self Governance Act, the Confederated Salish and Kootenai Tribes (CSKT) negotiated and entered a government-to-government agreement with the US Fish and Wildlife Service (USFWS). The agreement allowed the tribes to “take part in refuge programs that are of special geographical, historical, or cultural significance”. The tribes continued the campaign with the submission of three proposals to return the range to tribal control. In 2007, a split mission arrangement was cancelled amidst difficulty in the relationship. A replacement bridge over Mission Creek was completed in 2011 after USFWS contracted with the Tribe using funding from the Recovery Act. USFWS issued a final draft of the National Bison Range Comprehensive Management Plan in 2019. When surplus animals are released from the Range to other conservation herds around the country, the plan called for more collaboration with local, tribal and state partners. The proposed transfer gathered broad support from the community, conservation groups and politicians. After the transfer was included in the Consolidated Appropriations Act, a two-year transition process began when it became law on December 27, 2020. With the Bureau of Indian Affairs (BIA) taking the land into trust for CSKT in June 2021, the range was restored to the Flathead Indian Reservation. Assistant Secretary Tara Katuk Sweeney stated that “The CSKT have strong and deep historical, geographic and cultural ties to the land and the bison, and their environmental professionals have been leaders in natural resources and wildlife management for many decades.”

Tribal officials said the public would see little change during the annual reopening of Red Sleep Drive in May 2021 and all proceeds will be used for the management and operation of the Bison Range. Entrance fees were increased and Federal-use passes are no longer accepted since it is no longer a USFWS or National Park Service facility. January 2022 marked the beginning of the first full season of the Confederated Salish and Kootenai Tribes managing the site. New exhibits in the visitors center were the result of cultural committees from each tribe getting the correct history where the USFWS was unable to provide resources to improve the information being displayed. Both Secretary of the Interior, Deb Haaland, and state Attorney General, Kristen Juras, spoke at a celebration of the restoration in May. Tribal and government officials mentioned how the reunification of the tribe with the bison, the land and the resources righted a wrong in the history of the reservation.

== Geology ==
The range is a small, low-rolling mountain connected to the Mission Mountain Range by a gradually descending spur. Range elevation varies from 2,585 feet (788 m) at headquarters to 4,885 feet (1,489 m) at High Point on Red Sleep Mountain, the highest point on the Range. Much of the Bison Range was once under prehistoric Glacial Lake Missoula, which was formed by a glacial ice dam on the Clark Fork River about 13,000 to 18,000 years ago. The lake attained a maximum elevation of 4,200 feet (1,300 m), so the upper part of the Range was above water. Old beach lines are still evident on north-facing slopes. Topsoil on the Range is generally shallow and mostly underlain with rock which is exposed in many areas, forming ledges and talus slopes. Soils over the major portion of the Range were developed from materials weathered from strongly folded pre-Cambrian quartzite and argillite bedrock.

The Jocko River (Salish: nisisutetkʷ ntx̣ʷe) is a tributary of the Flathead River that forms the southern boundary of the range at it flows through the Jocko Valley.

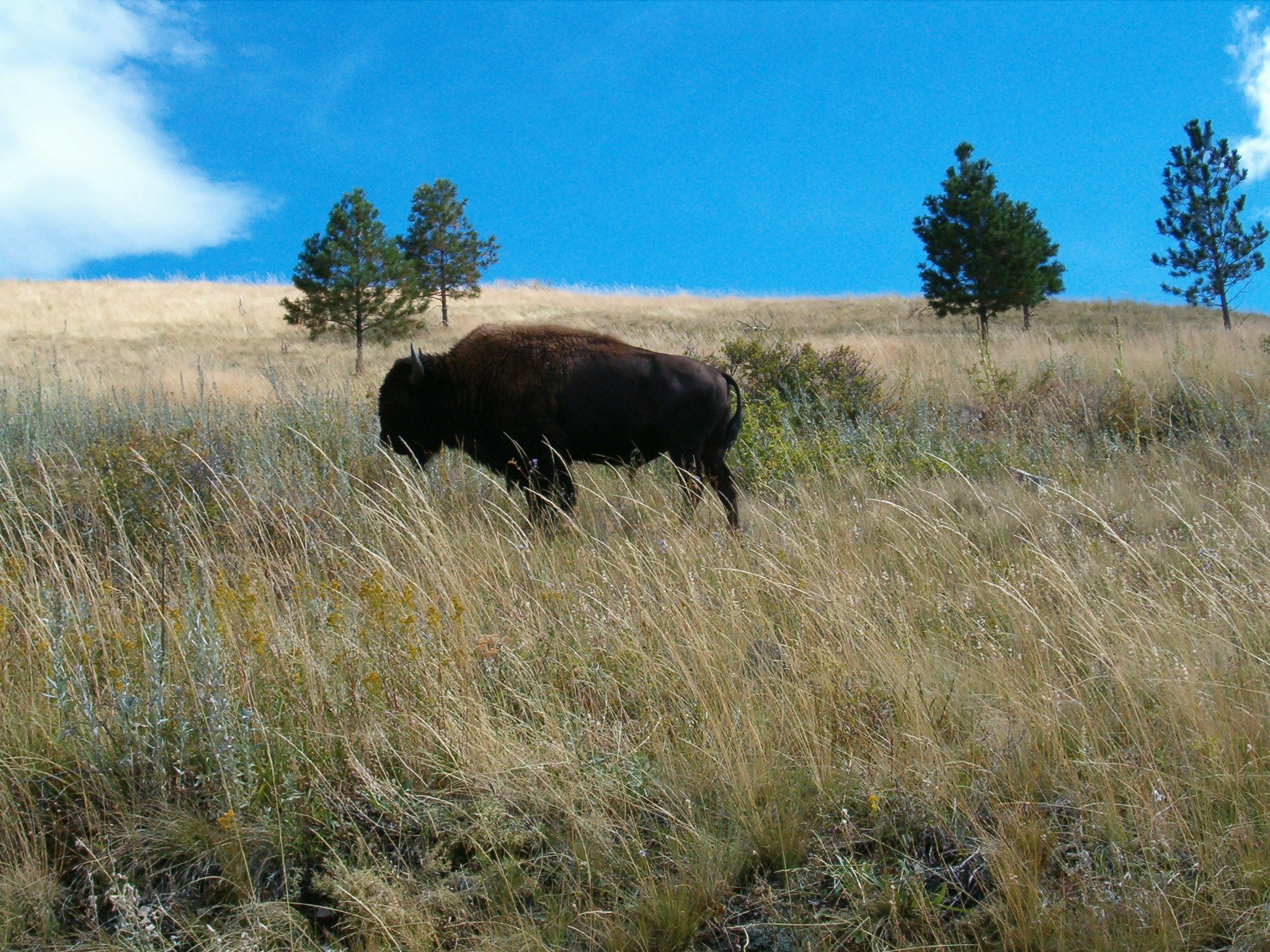
A bison roaming at the Bison Range

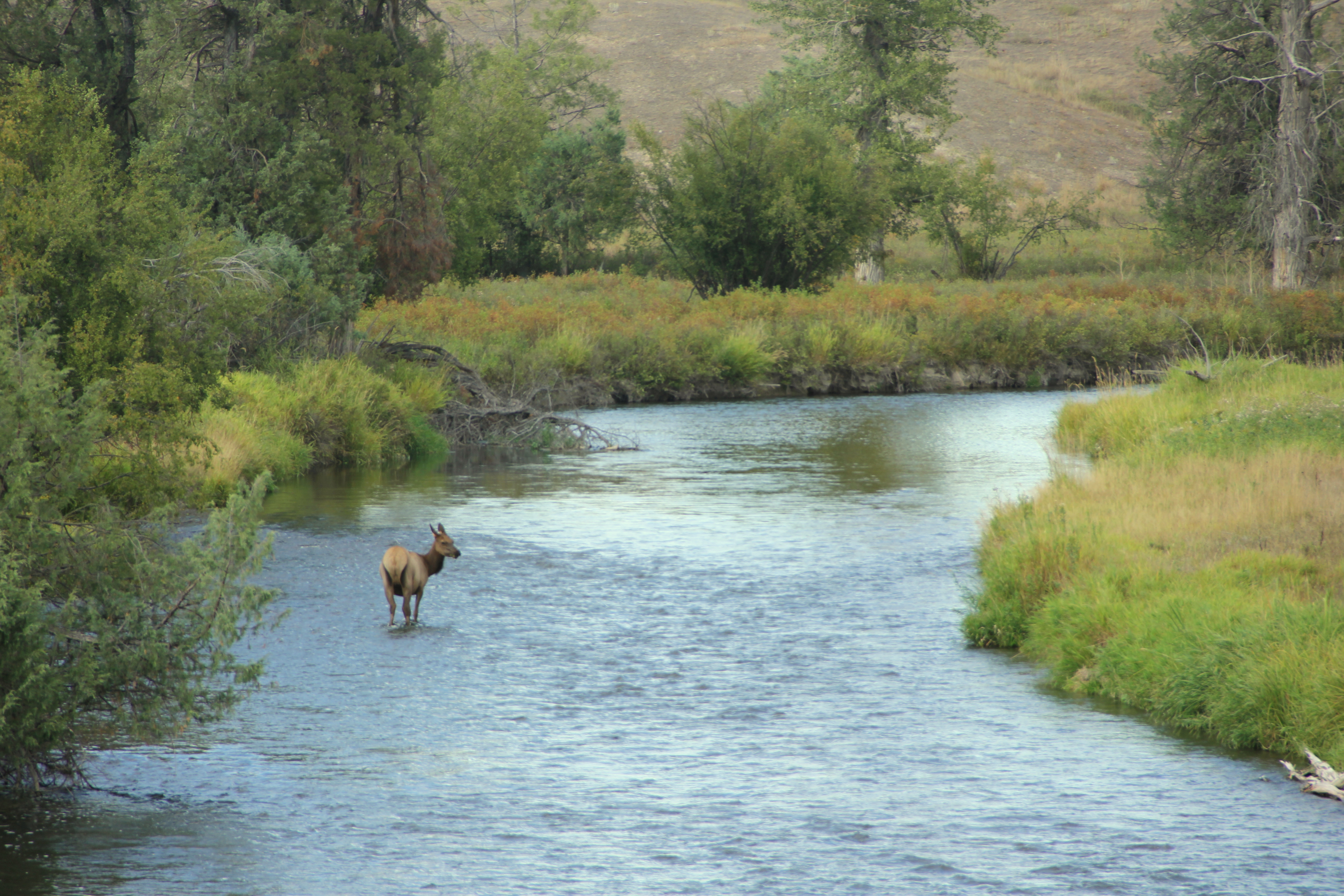
Elk (Cervus canadensis) in a creek

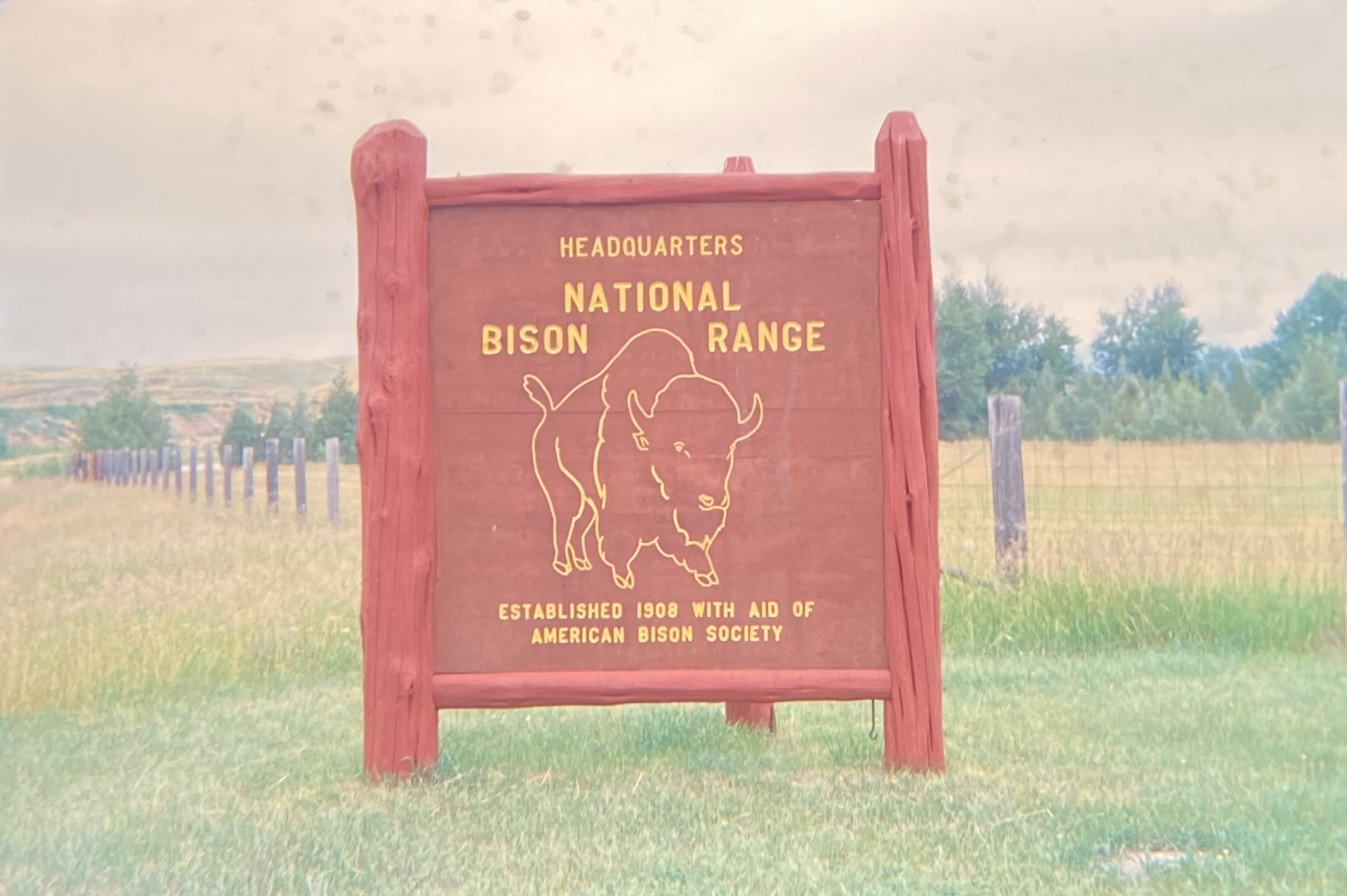
National Bison Range sign in 1978

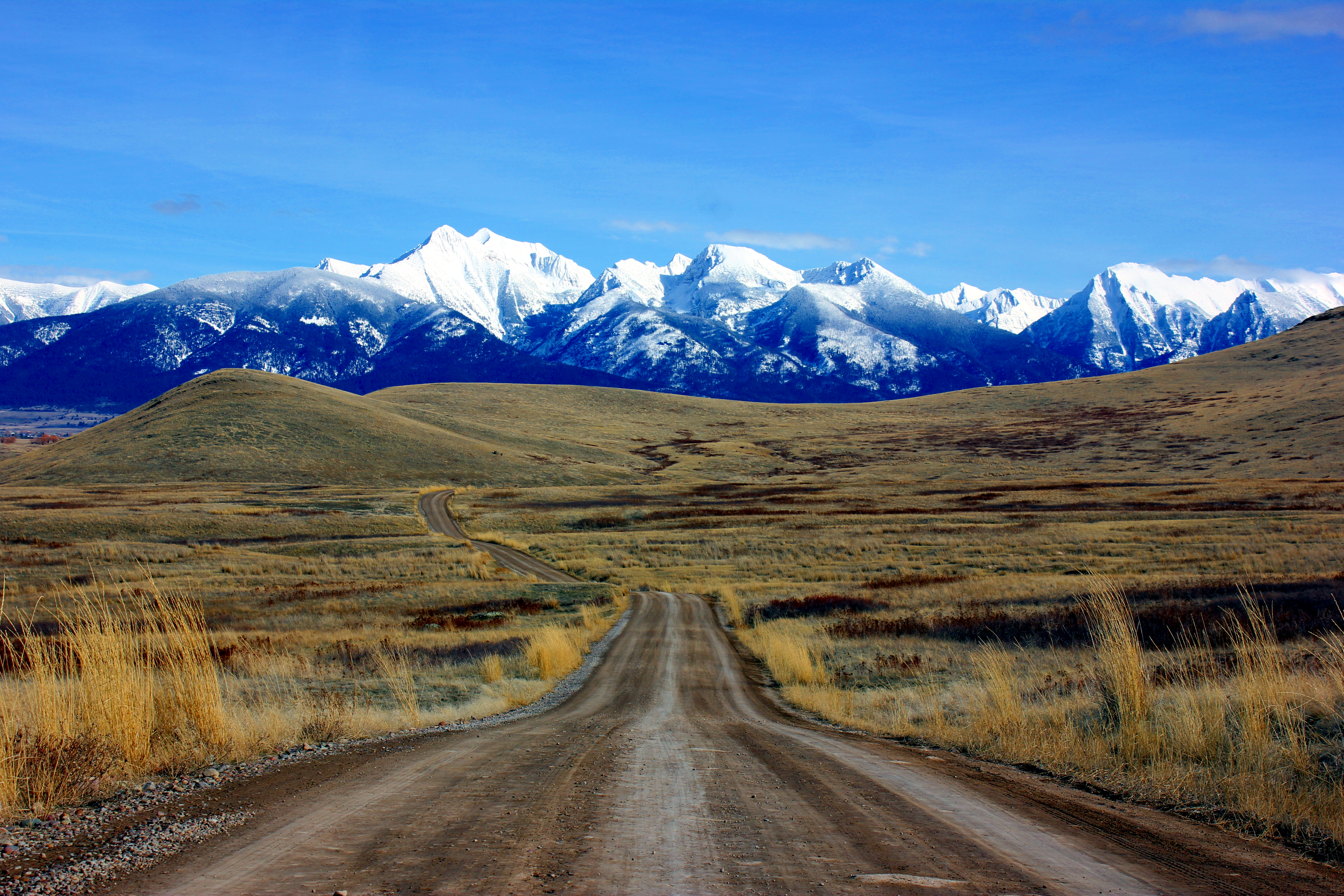
The Mission Mountains viewed from the Range

== Access ==
The BR has a visitor center, and two scenic roads that allow vehicular access to prime viewing areas. Two gravel roads through the range provide viewing of bison and other wildlife. The range is approximately one hour north of Missoula, Montana, off of U.S. Highway 93 directing visitors to the entrance and the range headquarters at Moiese, Montana.

== In popular culture ==
Ken Burns's 2023 film The American Buffalo includes scenes and interviews shot on the range.
