= Roxana Stinchfield Ferris =

U.S. botanist (1895–1978)

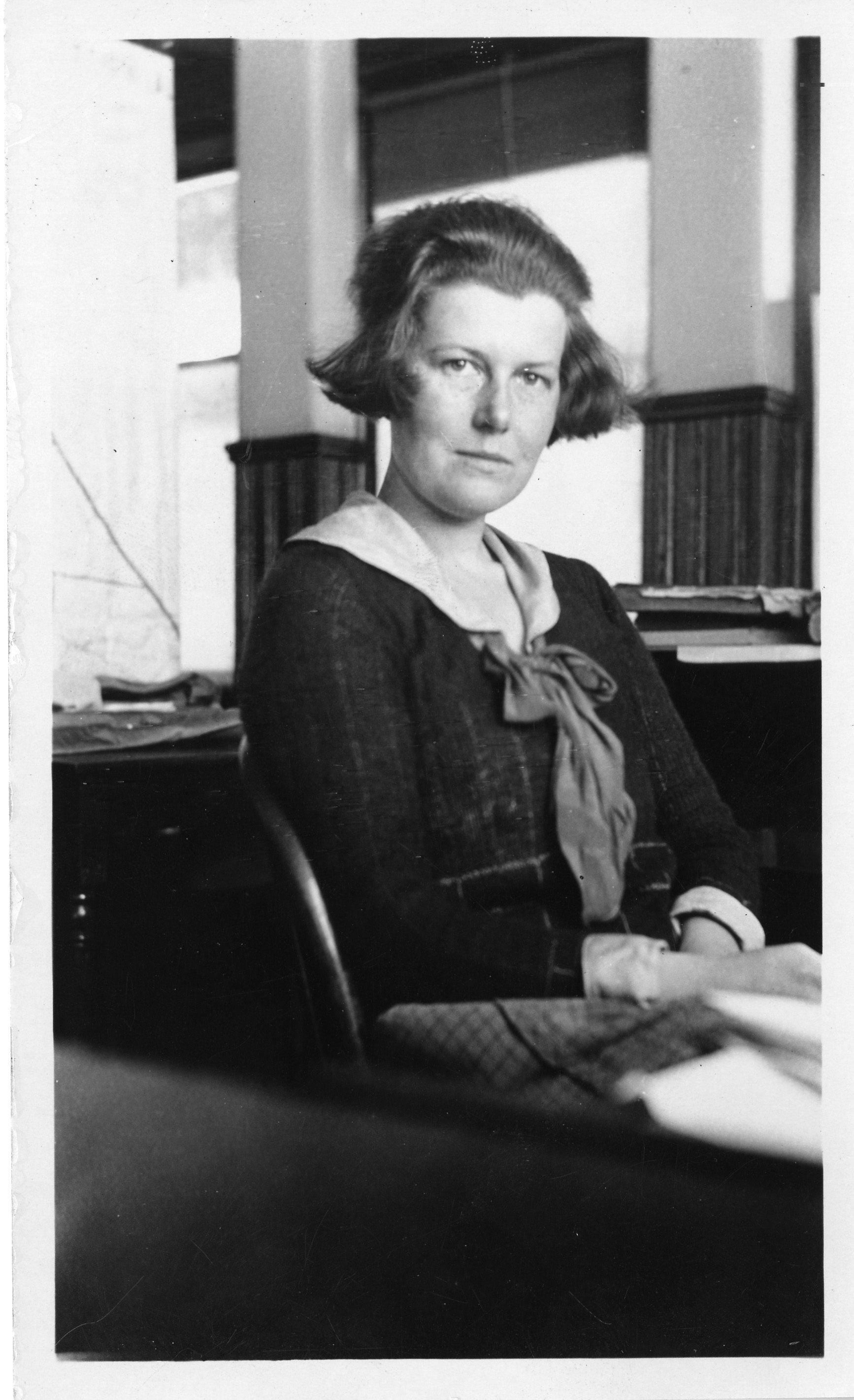
- At botany desk, Dudley Herbarium, Stanford University
- Born: Roxana Judkins Stinchfield; April 13, 1895; Sycamore, California
- Died: June 30, 1978 (aged 83); Palo Alto
- Education: Stanford University
- Occupation: botanist
- Spouse: Gordon Floyd Ferris (1893–1958)

Roxana Judkins Stinchfield Ferris (April 13, 1895 – June 30, 1978) was an American botanist.

She was born in Sycamore, California, to Moses and Annie Stinchfield. She was named after her grandmother, Roxany Judkins.

In 1916, Stinchfield Ferris earned a Master of Arts in Botany at Stanford University with advisor and mentor, LeRoy Abrams and afterwards she joined the staff of the Dudley Herbarium at Stanford, collecting thousands of botanical specimens for the research collection there. She specialized in collecting Phanerogams, and the botany of California and Mexico. Stinchfield Ferris retired from the Dudley Herbarium in 1963, and died in Palo Alto in 1978.

== Works ==
- The trees and shrubs of western Oregon
- An Illustrated Flora of the Pacific States (as co-editor)
- Death Valley Wildflowers
- Flowers of Point Reyes National Seashore
- Native Shrubs of the San Francisco Bay Region
- New Combinations in Aster

== Species named in honor ==
Several species have been named in honor of Ferris including

- Astragalus tener var. ferrisiae - Ferris's milk-vetch
- Eremogone ferrisiae - Ferris's sandwort
- Lasthenia ferrisiae - Ferris's goldfields
- Citharexylum roxanae
