= Ira Loren Wiggins =

American botanist (1899–1987)

- Botanist Ira L. Wiggins in 1951. Photo credit: Stanford Historical Photos Collection.
- Born: January 1, 1899; Madison, Wisconsin
- Died: November 28, 1987 (aged 88); Palo Alto, California
- Education: Stanford University
- Scientific career
- Fields: Botany, Natural History
- Author abbrev. (botany): Wiggins

Ira Loren Wiggins (1 January 1899 – 28 November 1987) was an American botanist, Curator of the Dudley Herbarium, and Director of the Natural History Museum (1940–1962) at Stanford University. He was a Stanford faculty member from 1929 until his retirement in 1964. He was the first recipient of the Fellow's Medal of the California Academy of Sciences. His Flora of Baja California is a standard work on the botany of the Baja peninsula and on the many islands of the Gulf of California.

Wiggins attended Occidental College as an undergraduate and received his M.A. at Stanford, studying with LeRoy Abrams, and where he won a university fellowship in botany in 1927. He earned his PhD in 1930 with a thesis on the flora of San Diego County. Wiggins made several botanical collecting trips to the Sonoran Desert, collaborating with Forrest Shreve in a description of the vegetation and flora of the North American Sonoran Desert including portions of Arizona, New Mexico, California, Sonora (Mexican State), Baja California Sur, and Baja California. He published extensively on the floras of North American desert landscapes, the flora of the Arctic Slope of Alaska, and flora of the Galápagos Islands.

Starting in May 1944, Wiggins spent nine months in Ecuador as part of the Mision de Cinchona. He was appointed head of Johns Hopkins University's Arctic research laboratory in Point Barrow, Alaska in 1950.

== Legacy ==
Wiggins is commemorated in the scientific names of two species of lizards, Phrynosoma wigginsi and Xantusia wigginsi.

== Selected publications ==
- A Flora of the Alaskan Arctic Slope; Ira Loren Wiggins & John Thomas Hunter (1962)
- Vegetation and Flora of the Sonoran Desert; Ira Loren Wiggins & Forrest Shreve (1964)
- Flora of the Galapagos Islands; Ira Loren Wiggins & Duncan Macnair Porter; Stanford University Press (1971)
- Flora of Baja California; Ira Loren Wiggins (1980)
