= Homestead Acts =

US laws allowing ownership of unclaimed land

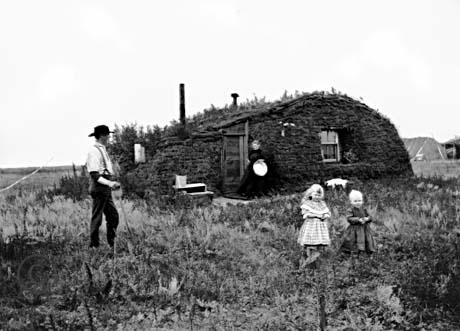
Norwegian settlers in North Dakota, 1898

The Homestead Acts were several laws in the United States by which an applicant could acquire ownership of government land or the public domain, typically called a homestead. In all, more than 160 million acres (650 thousand km^{2}; 250 thousand sq mi) of public land, or nearly 10 percent of the total area of the United States, were given away free to 1.6 million homesteaders; most of the homesteads were west of the Mississippi River.

An extension of the homestead principle in law, the Homestead Acts were an expression of the Free Soil policy of Northerners who wanted individual farmers to own and operate their own farms, as opposed to Southern slave owners who wanted to buy up large tracts of land and use slave labor, thereby shutting out free farmers.

For a number of years individual Congressmen put forward bills providing for homesteading, but it was not until 1862 that the first homestead act was passed. The Homestead Act of 1862 opened up millions of acres. Any adult who had never taken up arms against the federal government of the United States could apply. Women and immigrants who had applied for citizenship were eligible. Most homesteading occurred during the period of 1900–1930. As of 2017, around 93 million Americans were descendants of people who received land through the Homestead Acts.

== Background ==
Land-grant laws similar to the Homestead Acts had been proposed by northern Republicans prior to the Civil War, but they had been repeatedly blocked in Congress by Democrats who wanted western lands open for purchase by slave owners. The Homestead Act of 1860 passed in Congress but was vetoed by President James Buchanan, a Democrat. After the Southern states seceded from the Union in 1861 (and their representatives had left Congress), the bill passed and was signed into law by President Abraham Lincoln (May 20, 1862). Daniel Freeman became the first person to file a claim under the new act.

Between 1862 and 1934, the federal government granted 1.6 million homesteads and distributed 270,000,000 acres (420,000 mi^{2}) of federal land for private ownership. This was a total of 10% of all land in the United States. Homesteading was discontinued in 1976, except in Alaska, where it continued until 1986. About 40% of the applicants who started the process were able to complete it and obtain title to their homesteaded land after paying a small fee in cash.

Homestead laws depleted Native American resources as much of the land they relied on was taken by the federal government and sold to settlers. Native ancestral lands had been limited through history, mainly through land allotments and reservations, causing a gradual decrease in this Indigenous land. Many of these land-grabs occurred during and after treaty negotiations between Indigenous tribes and the United States. Native Americans often traded their land in exchange for citizenship and civil rights. Due to the United States' economic power, these tribes had little leverage and millions of acres of land were transferred from their ownership. It was difficult for Indigenous people to legally challenge this infringement because they lacked legal rights and legal standing. These treaties were used to naturalize and civilize Native Americans. Native Americans were not allowed to file land claims under the Homestead Acts unless they renounced their tribal citizenship.

As an indirect, de facto way to secure the dispossessed land, the US government allowed late homesteading during the early twentieth century. This acted as a way to solidify settlements and permanently disrupt tribal land practices in the face of backlash.

The Homestead Acts also resulted in tensions between settlers and Indigenous people, partly due to settlers moving onto Indigenous territory while it was still occupied. Settlements excused Indian removal and culminated in multiple wars waged by settler militia.

Also involved in the acts were Buffalo soldiers, African-American soldiers who were key in building the American frontier in the West. They often engaged in wars with Native Americans, led by the government, to take over Indigenous land.

Some settlers in the Dakota Territory, and later in South Dakota and North Dakota, who gained land through the Homestead Acts were Jewish or Muslim. Jewish homesteaders were largely Russian Jews fleeing pogroms in the Russian Empire. 1200 settled in North Dakota. After they acquired farms they soon moved to town. Syro-Lebanese Muslim settlers who gained land through the Homestead Acts created a settlement in Ross, North Dakota, where they would later found the first mosque in the United States.

Some homesteaders were Hispanics and Latinos. Hispanic and Latino homesteaders included Chilean immigrants, Mexican immigrants, and US-born Latinos. Some US-born Latinos from New Mexico moved north to Colorado to become homesteaders.

Few homesteaders were Asian during the 1800s, as the Naturalization Act of 1870 denied citizenship to Asians. The Supreme Court's decision in United States v. Wong Kim Ark (1898), which affirmed birthright citizenship for Chinese Americans, opened the Homestead Acts to Asian Americans.

== History ==
=== Preemption Act of 1841 ===
The Preemption Act of 1841 allowed settlers to claim up to 160 acres of federal land for themselves and prevent its sale to others including large landowners or corporations; they paid only a low fixed price of $1.25 per acre ($3.09 per hectare). To qualify, a person had to be either 21 years old or a "head of household" (such as a parent or surviving sibling supporting a family), a citizen or an immigrant declaring to become a citizen, and a resident on that land for a minimum of 14 months. To get permanent title to the land, the person had to accomplish certain actions, such as continue to reside on it or improve it for at least five years; they could not leave or abandon it for more than six months at a time.

=== Donation Land Claim Act of 1850 ===
After the creation of the Oregon territory in 1848, the US government had passed the most generous land distribution bill in US history. The Oregon Donation Land Claim Act of 1850 allowed settlers to claim land in the Oregon Territory, then including the modern states of Washington, Oregon, Idaho and parts of Wyoming. Until its repeal in 1855, the Act allowed individual white settlers to claim 320 acres, or 640 to married couples, at a price of $1.25 per acre.

The Donation Land Claim Act had many negative effects on Indigenous people as well as Black people in the Pacific Northwest. Not only did the act use the land taken away from the Indigenous people in the Pacific Northwest, but the act also barred Black citizens from owning land and real estate. The act guaranteed land for White settlers and "half-breed" Indian men to the Oregon territory. This act followed the passing of the 1848 territorial organic act which allowed any white settler to claim a maximum of six hundred and forty acres. The Land Donation Act, however, also acknowledged women's property rights due to Congress allowing the donation of four hundred acres to settlers—land that could be claimed by heads of households—including women. This act differed from the Homestead Act of 1866 due to the ineligibility of Black citizens from applying.

=== Homestead Act of 1862 ===
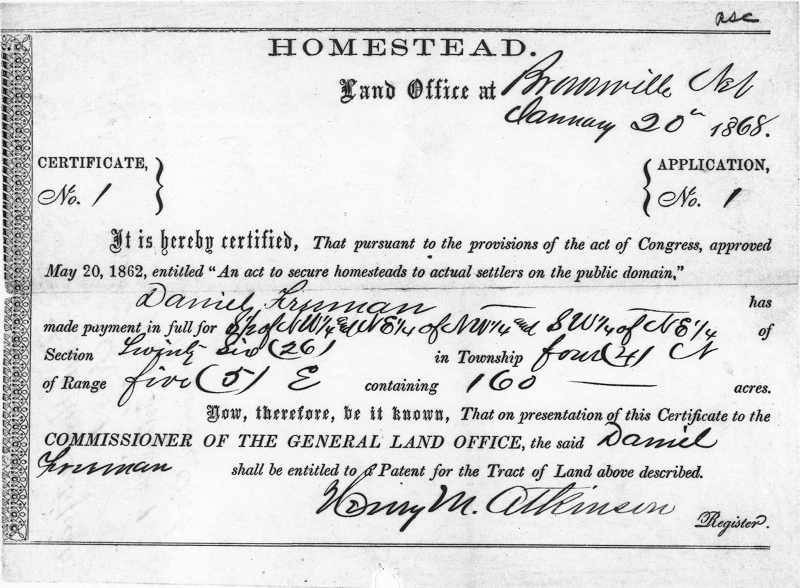
Certificate of homestead in Nebraska given under the Homestead Act, 1862

The "yeoman farmer" ideal of Jeffersonian democracy was still a powerful influence in American politics during the 1840–1850s, with many politicians believing a homestead act would help increase the number of "virtuous yeomen". The Free Soil Party of 1848–52, and the new Republican Party after 1854, demanded that the new lands opening up in the west be made available to independent farmers, rather than wealthy planters who would develop it with the use of slaves forcing the yeomen farmers onto marginal lands. Southern Democrats had continually fought (and defeated) previous homestead law proposals, as they feared free land would attract European immigrants and poor Southern whites to the west.

The intent of the Homestead Act of 1862 was to reduce the cost of homesteading under the Preemption Act; after the South seceded and their delegates left Congress in 1861, the Republicans and supporters from the upper South passed a homestead act signed by Abraham Lincoln on May 20, 1862, which went into effect on Jan. 1st, 1863. Its leading advocates were Andrew Johnson, George Henry Evans, and Horace Greeley. George Henry Evans famously coined the phrase "Vote Yourself a Farm" in a bid to garner support for the movement.

In addition to the previous requirement in the Preemption Act of being either 21 years old or the head of a family, the 1862 act also allowed for persons under 21 who had served in the regular or volunteer forces of the U.S. army or navy for at least 14 days during "the existence of an actual war domestic or foreign".

The new act also required that the person "has never borne arms against the United States Government or given aid and comfort to its enemies"; unlike the 1848 and 1850 laws, it did not have any provision mentioning race. The act gave citizens or intended citizens 160 acres of surveyed public land if they improved their plot by cultivating the land.

The Homestead act expanded, rather than changed, the 1841 Preemption Act. The claimed homestead could include the same land which they had previously filed a preemption claim (on up to 160 acres at $1.25 per acre, or up to 80 acres of subdivided and surveyed land at $2.50 per acre), and they could expand their current ownership to contiguous adjacent land up to 160 acres total.

The homestead application must be "made for his or her exclusive use and benefit, and that said entry [onto public land] is made for the purpose of actual settlement and cultivation, and not either directly or indirectly for the use or benefit of any other person or persons whomsoever". The acquired land would not be liable for any debts incurred prior to the issuance of the patent for it.

The time requirement for residence or cultivation was set at 5 years; if it was proven "after due notice" that they moved residence or abandoned the land for more than six months at a time, then the land reverted to the government. A homesteader could also pay the $1.25 (or the current rate) per acre price after proof of the less-stringent requirements set in the Preemption Act.

After filing an affidavit with the government's agent, and paying him a $10 fee, the homesteader could begin occupying their claim. The government agent received the same fee for homestead land as he would have received if that land was sold for cash, 1/2 from the homesteader's filing fee and the other half from the patent (certificate) fee. The homesteader did not get a certificate or patent until they or their heirs filed, after 5 years (but before 7 years), further affidavits from two neighbors or "credible witnesses" and an additional $8 fee. Those affidavits affirmed the 5 years of residence or cultivation and that "no part of said land has been alienated [transferred or mortgaged], and that he [the homesteader] has borne true allegiance to the Government of the United States".

If both parents died and all the children were under 21, an executor under state law could sell (for the benefit of the children, and not the estate) an absolute title to the land within two years of the parent's death. The purchaser would pay office fees for a patent to the land.

=== Southern Homestead Act of 1866 ===
The act was enacted to allow poor tenant farmers and sharecroppers in the South to become landowners in the Southern United States during Reconstruction. In the South, poor farmers and sharecroppers made up the majority of the population so the act sold land at a lower price to decrease poverty among the working class.

It was not very successful, as even the low prices and fees were often too much for the applicants to afford. The land made available was also mostly undeveloped forest, and only white people had the means to make them productive.

=== Timber Culture Act of 1873 ===
The Timber Culture Act granted up to 160 acres of land to a homesteader who would plant at least 40 acres (revised to 10) of trees over a period of several years. This quarter-section could be added to an existing homestead claim, offering a total of 320 acres to a settler.

=== Indian Homestead Act of 1875 ===
The 1862 Homestead Act did not include Indigenous peoples, so Congress passed the Indian Homestead Act to give Native family heads the opportunity to purchase homesteads from unclaimed public lands. This was under the condition that the individual relinquished their tribal identity and relations, along with the land improvement requirements. The federal land title was not officially granted to Native Americans until a period of five years had passed.

Because the US government did not issue fee waivers, many poor non-reservation Natives were unable to pay filing fees to claim homesteads. Access to such homesteads was further complicated by delays in resolving border disputes due to distance and discord between the US Land Office and the Bureau of Indian Affairs. This made white settlements easier to finalize.

=== Kinkaid Amendment of 1904 ===
Recognizing that the Sandhills of north-central Nebraska required more than 160 acres for a claimant to support a family, Congress passed the Kinkaid Act, which granted larger homestead tracts, up to 640 acres, to homesteaders in Nebraska.

=== Forest Homestead Act of 1906 ===
This act allowed homesteads within Forest Reserves (created from 1891 on) and National Forests (from 1905? on), responding to opponents of the nation's Forest Reserves who felt land suited for agriculture was being withheld from private development. Homestead applications were reviewed by the U.S. Forest Service (created in 1905). While at first five years residency was required (per the 1862 Act), in 1913 this act was amended to allow proving up in just three years.

=== Enlarged Homestead Act of 1909 ===
Because by the early 1900s much of the prime low-lying alluvial land along rivers had been homesteaded, the Enlarged Homestead Act was passed in 1909. To enable dryland farming, it increased the number of acres for a homestead to 320 acres (130 ha) given to farmers who accepted more marginal lands (especially in the Great Plains), which could not be easily irrigated.

A massive influx of these new farmers, combined with inappropriate cultivation techniques and misunderstanding of the ecology, led to immense land erosion and eventually the Dust Bowl of the 1930s.

=== Stock-Raising Homestead Act of 1916 ===
In 1916, the Stock-Raising Homestead Act was passed for settlers seeking 640 acres (260 ha) of public land for ranching purposes.

=== Subsistence Homesteads provisions under the New Deal – 1930s ===
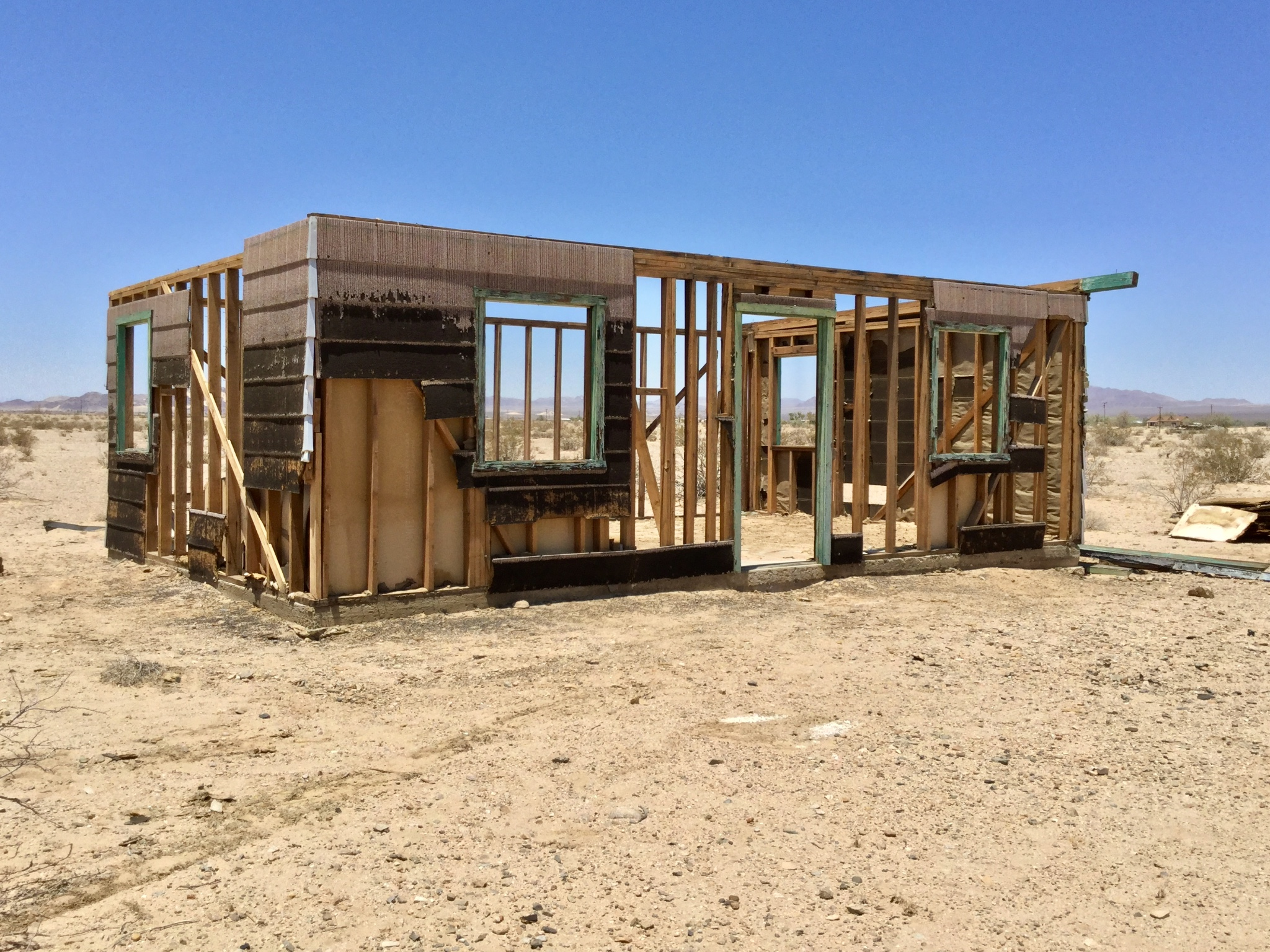
Typical STA "Jackrabbit" homestead cabin remains in Wonder Valley, California

Renewed interest in homesteading was brought about by U.S. President Franklin D. Roosevelt's program of Subsistence Homesteading implemented in the 1930s under the New Deal.

==== Small Tracts Act ====
In 1938 Congress passed a law, called the Small Tract Act (STA) of 1938, by which it is possible for any citizen to obtain certain lands from the Federal Government for residence, recreation, or business purposes. These tracts may not usually be larger than 5 acres. A 5-acre tract would be one which is 660 feet long and 330 feet wide, or its equivalent. The property was to be improved with a building. Starting July 1955, improvement was required to be minimum of 400 sq. feet of space. 4,000 previously classified Small Tracts were offered at public auction at fair market value, circa 1958, by the Los Angeles Office of BLM.

== In practice ==
Settlers found land and filed their claims at the regional land office, usually in individual family units, although others formed closer-knit communities. Often, the homestead consisted of several buildings or structures besides the main house.

The Homestead Act of 1862 gave rise later to a new phenomenon, large land rushes, such as the Oklahoma Land Runs of the 1880s and 90s.

== End under Federal Land Policy and Management Act ==
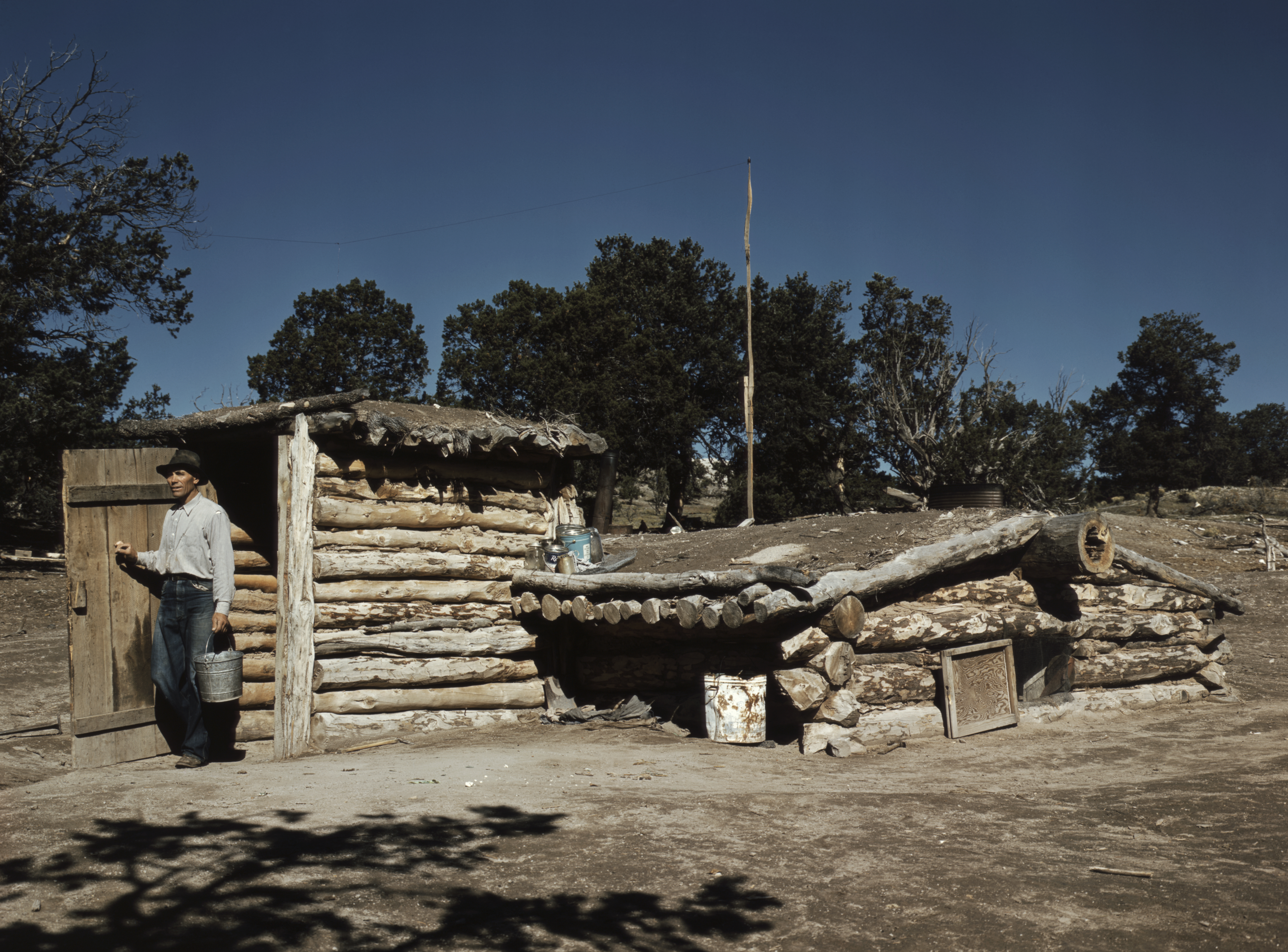
Dugout home from a homestead near Pie Town, New Mexico, 1940

The Federal Land Policy and Management Act of 1976 ended homesteading; by that time, federal government policy had shifted to retaining control of western public lands. The only exception to this new policy was in Alaska, for which the law allowed homesteading until 1986.

Elizabeth (Betty) Clouse-Smith was the last woman homesteader to successfully prove up land in her own name. She was among a group of people, including her son William J. Smith, who filed for homestead west of Big Delta, Alaska. On October 18, 1984, she received a patent for her 116-acre claim (47 ha).

The last claim under this Act was made by Ken Deardorff for 80 acres (32 ha) of land on the Stony River in southwestern Alaska. He fulfilled all requirements of the homestead act in 1979 but did not receive his deed until May 1988. He is the last person to receive a title to land claimed under the Homestead Acts.

== Issues and concerns ==
The Homestead Acts were sometimes abused, but historians continue to debate the extent. In the 1950s and 1960s, historians Fred Albert Shannon, Roy Robbins, and Paul Wallace Gates emphasized fraudulent episodes, and historians largely turned away from the issue. In recent decades, however, the argument has mostly been that on the whole fraud was a relatively minor element and that strongly positive impacts regarding women and the family have only recently been appreciated. Robert Higgs argues that the Homestead Act induced no long-term misallocation of resources. In 1995, a random survey of 178 members of the Economic History Association found that 70 percent of economists and 84 percent of economic historians disagreed with the statement "Nineteenth-century U.S. land policy, which attempted to give away free land, probably represented a net drain on the productive capacity of the country."

Some scholars believe the acreage limits were reasonable when the act was written but argue that no one understood the physical conditions of the plains. After a few generations, a family could build up a sizable estate.

According to Hugh Nibley, much of the rainforest west of Portland, Oregon, was acquired by the Oregon Lumber Company by illegal claims under the Act.

=== Racism ===
Several additional laws were enacted in the late 19th and early 20th centuries to address the concerns of African Americans. The Southern Homestead Act of 1866 sought to address land ownership inequalities in the south during Reconstruction. It explicitly included Black Americans and encouraged them to participate, and, although rampant discrimination, systemic barriers, and bureaucratic inertia considerably slowed Black gains, the 1866 law was part of the reason that within a generation after its passage, by 1900, one quarter of all Southern Black farmers were farm owners. Later Homestead acts only marginally benefited African Americans.

=== Indigenous land dispossession ===
The Homestead Acts contributed to the settlement of lands traditionally occupied by Native American peoples and, in some regions, to their dispossession. Much of the federal public domain made available to homesteaders had previously been Indigenous territory, acquired by the United States. In some states, Indigenous land was transferred before substantial homesteading occurred, while in the Dakotas and Oklahoma homesteading was an important mechanism through which Indigenous lands passed to non-Indigenous settlers.

Under the Dawes Act of 1887, communally held reservation lands were divided into individual allotments, with land deemed "surplus" subsequently opened to non-Native settlement. Reservation landholdings declined from about 138 million acres in 1887 to 48 million acres by 1934.

== Related acts in other countries ==
=== Canada ===
Similar laws were passed in Canada:

The Legislative Assembly of Ontario passed The Free Grants and Homestead Act in 1868, which introduced a conditional scheme to an existing free grant plan previously authorized by the Province of Canada in The Public Lands Act of 1860. It was extended to include settlement in the Rainy River District under The Rainy River Free Grants and Homestead Act, 1886, These Acts were consolidated in 1913 in The Public Lands Act, which was further extended in 1948 to provide for free grants to former members of the Canadian Forces. The original free grant provisions for settlers were repealed in 1951, and the remaining provisions were repealed in 1961.

The Parliament of Canada passed the Dominion Lands Act in 1872 in order to encourage settlement in the Northwest Territories. Its application was restricted after the passage of the Natural Resources Acts in 1930, and it was finally repealed in 1950.

The Legislative Assembly of Quebec did not expand the scope of the 1860 Province of Canada Act (which modern day Quebec was part of in 1860), but did provide in 1868 that such lands were exempt from seizure, and chattels thereon were also exempt for the first ten years of occupation. Later known as the Settlers Protection Act, it was repealed in 1984.

Newfoundland and Labrador provided for free grants of land upon proof of possession for twenty years prior to 1977, with continuous use for agricultural, business or residential purposes during that time. Similar programs continued to operate in Alberta and British Columbia until 1970. In the early 21st century, some land is still being granted in the Yukon Territory under its Agricultural Lands Program.

=== New Zealand ===
Despite the 1840 Treaty of Waitangi provisions for sale of land, the Māori Land Court decided that all land not cultivated by Māori was 'waste land' and belonged to the Crown without purchase. Most provinces in colonial New Zealand had Waste Lands Acts enacted between 1854 and 1877. The 1874 Waste Lands Act in Auckland Province used the term Homestead, with allocation administered by a Crown Lands Board. There was similar legislation in Westland. It gave up to 75 acres (30 ha), with settlers just paying the cost of a survey. They had to live there for five years, build a house and cultivate a third of the land, if already open, or a fifth if bush had to be cleared. The land was forfeited if they did not clear enough bush. Further amendments were made in 1877, 1882 and 1885, adding details such as pastoral and perpetual leases and village and special settlements. This contributed to rapid deforestation.

== See also ==
- Desert Land Act
- Homestead National Historical Park
- Land Act of 1804
- Forty acres and a mule, proposal to help freed slaves
- Russian Homestead Act, of 2016
- South 40
- Squatting in the United States
- Black homesteaders
- Settler colonialism
