= Dudley Herbarium =

The Dudley Herbarium was the herbarium or plant specimen collection of the Stanford University Natural History Museum and the former Division of Systematic Biology of the Department of Biology, at Stanford University in California.

== History ==
In the 19th century, the specialized practice of botany began to emerge from the older study of natural history. Americans studied established herbaria techniques in Europe and applied them to new institutional herbaria practices at home. Asa Gray pioneered the field in the United States with the formation of the Harvard University Herbaria in 1842. Herbaria were soon created on the West Coast at the California Academy of Sciences (CAS), the University of California, Berkeley, and at Stanford.

The Stanford Herbarium debuted in 1891 with the opening of the university. At the time, it contained 70,000 specimens, duplicates from the collection of Irish botanist William H. Harvey. American botanist William R. Dudley (1849−1911) joined Stanford that next year and expanded the collection, helping to narrow its focus to the flora of California. Dudley was the head of the Botany Department from 1892 to 1911. Meanwhile, the 1906 San Francisco earthquake destroyed virtually the entirety of the CAS collection, but curator Alice Eastwood still managed to save 1500 specimens.

After Dudley's death in 1911, the Stanford Herbarium was renamed in his honor. Botanist LeRoy Abrams became curator in 1920. He continued making major contributions until his own retirement in 1940. Following Abrams, Reed C. Rollins became curator, then Richard W. Holm in 1950, Roxana Stinchfield Ferris in 1961, and John Hunter Thomas in 1963, who later became director from 1972-1995.

In the early 1960s, Stanford Provost Frederick E. Terman made a decision to terminate support for the Division of Systematic Biology. Subsequently, various subcollections were transferred to other institutions in 1968 (algae to the University of California, fungi to the U.S. National Fungus Collections and arctic bryophytes to the New York Botanical Garden).

The main vascular plant collection was eventually transferred (by long-term loan), along with Stanford's Natural History Museum fish collections, to the California Academy of Sciences in San Francisco. In 1976, the Dudley Herbarium had 850,000-specimens, which were merged with the 600,000 specimens of the California Academy Herbarium, on completion of what was at the time a state-of-the-art facility to house the collections and staff, funded mostly by a grant from the National Science Foundation.

== See also ==
- California Academy of Sciences topics
- Flora of California topics
