= Morton John Elrod =

American ecologist

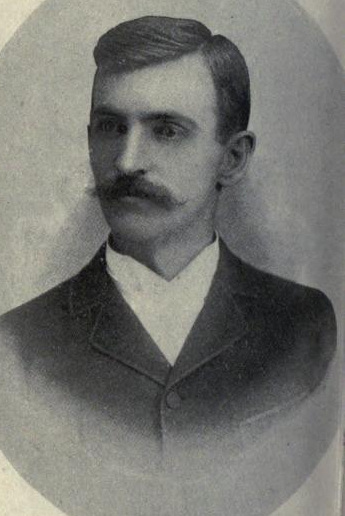
Elrod in 1903

Morton John Elrod (27 April 1863 - 19 January 1953) was an American ecologist and professor at the University of Montana. He founded the Philip L. Wright Zoological Museum in 1897 and Flathead Lake Biological Station in 1899. It was established to encourage research and field education and has been the site of numerous long-term biological studies. He was also appointed by the American Bison Society to examine potential reserves in Montana which led to the establishment of the National Bison Range. A keen photographer and researcher, he conducted research and wrote several books on a variety of topics. A number of species have been named in Elrod's honor by researchers.

Elrod was born in Monongahela, Pennsylvania, the son of John Morton Elrod. He went to Simpson College from where he received a BA (1887) after which he taught at a high school in Corydon, Iowa. He continued studies and joined the Illinois Wesleyan University and received an MA (1890) and MS (1898) while also teaching there. In 1896 he took up a position in the University of Montana at Missoula. He taught subjects in biology as well as photography, in which he took a keen interest himself. He also set up a natural history museum. He encouraged his students to learn first-hand from observation and emphasized education in the field. He founded the Flathead Lake Biological Station with a view to using it for research and education, especially due to its convenient location for Montana students. He also examined the area for its potential to support a bison reserve. He published numerous scientific papers as well as wrote poetry and on matters of history and philosophy. He did not receive much support from the University and especially found himself in conflict with the administration by its president Oscar John Craig. One of the students who admired Elrod was physical chemist Harold C. Urey who later won a Nobel Prize.

Elrod married Emma Hartshorn in 1888. A stroke in 1934 ended his career and after the death of his wife in 1938, he was taken care of by his daughter. A couple of land molluscs Oreohelix elrodi, Stagnicola elrodi, and an annelid Rhynchelmis elrodi are among the species named in his honor.

== Other sources ==
- Dennison, George M. (2016). Montana's Pioneer Naturalist: Morton J. Elrod. University of Oklahoma Press.
