= Jessie M. Bierman =

American physician

- Born: April 6, 1900; Egan Slough, Montana
- Died: August 26, 1996 (aged 96); Monterey County, California
- Education: University of Montana (B.A., 1921); University of Chicago (M.D., 1926); Columbia University (M.P.H., 1941)
- Occupations: Maternity and Pediatrics Specialist
- Awards: Honorary Doctorate (Sc.D.) from the University of Montana (1967), Martha May Eliot Award from the American Public Health Association (1968)

Jessie M. Bierman was born on April 6, 1900, at Egan Slough near Kalispell, Montana, to Henry and Alice Bierman. She received her bachelor of arts from the University of Montana in 1921 and got a medical degree from Rush Medical College of the University of Chicago in 1926. She earned a master of public health at the Institute of Columbia University fifteen years later.

Bierman worked in private practice in San Francisco, California, from 1927 to 1936 and also served as an instructor in pediatrics at the University of California School of Medicine. In 1936, Bierman returned to Montana to work as Director of Maternal and Child Health in the Montana Department of Health. She started well-baby clinics in Montana that were a model for such programs across the country.

From 1938 to 1942, she worked with the United States Children’s Bureau in Washington, D.C., as assistant director of the Division of Health Sciences. She was chief of Maternal and Child Health of the California Department of Public Health from 1942 to 1947, during which she became a lecturer in pediatrics and a professor of maternal and child health at the UCSF School of Medicine, a position she held until 1963. She was named professor emerita in 1963, but stayed on as the director of maternal and child health research until 1967. While at the University of California, Bierman traveled to Germany as an expert in maternal and child health and served as a consultant on maternal and child health problems in India. Bierman also studied the children of Kauaʻi, Hawaii, and published her findings in the book The Children of Kauaʻi. After that, she was the head of the maternal and child bureau for the World Health Organization in Geneva, Switzerland and was visiting professor of public health at the University of North Carolina.

Bierman was the recipient of an honorary doctorate by the University of Montana in 1967. Jessie Bierman was the recipient of the Martha May Eliot Award of the American Public Health Association in 1968, "which honors extraordinary health services to women and children." Bierman's career was especially pioneering in advancing maternity and pediatric care in underprivileged communities with her studies that analyzed the roles that social factors, such as poverty, cultural, ethnic, and geographic factors, had on pregnancy, childbirth, and postnatal care on both the mother and the child. Bierman's career contributions to public health, especially toward mothers and children, played a crucial role in lowering the maternal death rates and infant mortality rates nationwide.

Bierman had a summer residence at Goose Bay on Flathead Lake. Bierman supported academics and research at The University of Montana’s Biological Station, endowing a distinguished professorship to support an internationally recognized ecologist to study and direct research at the Flathead Lake Biological Station. Jessie Bierman died on August 26, 1996, in Monterey County, California at the age of 96.
