= Homestead Act of 1860 =

Vetoed United States legislation

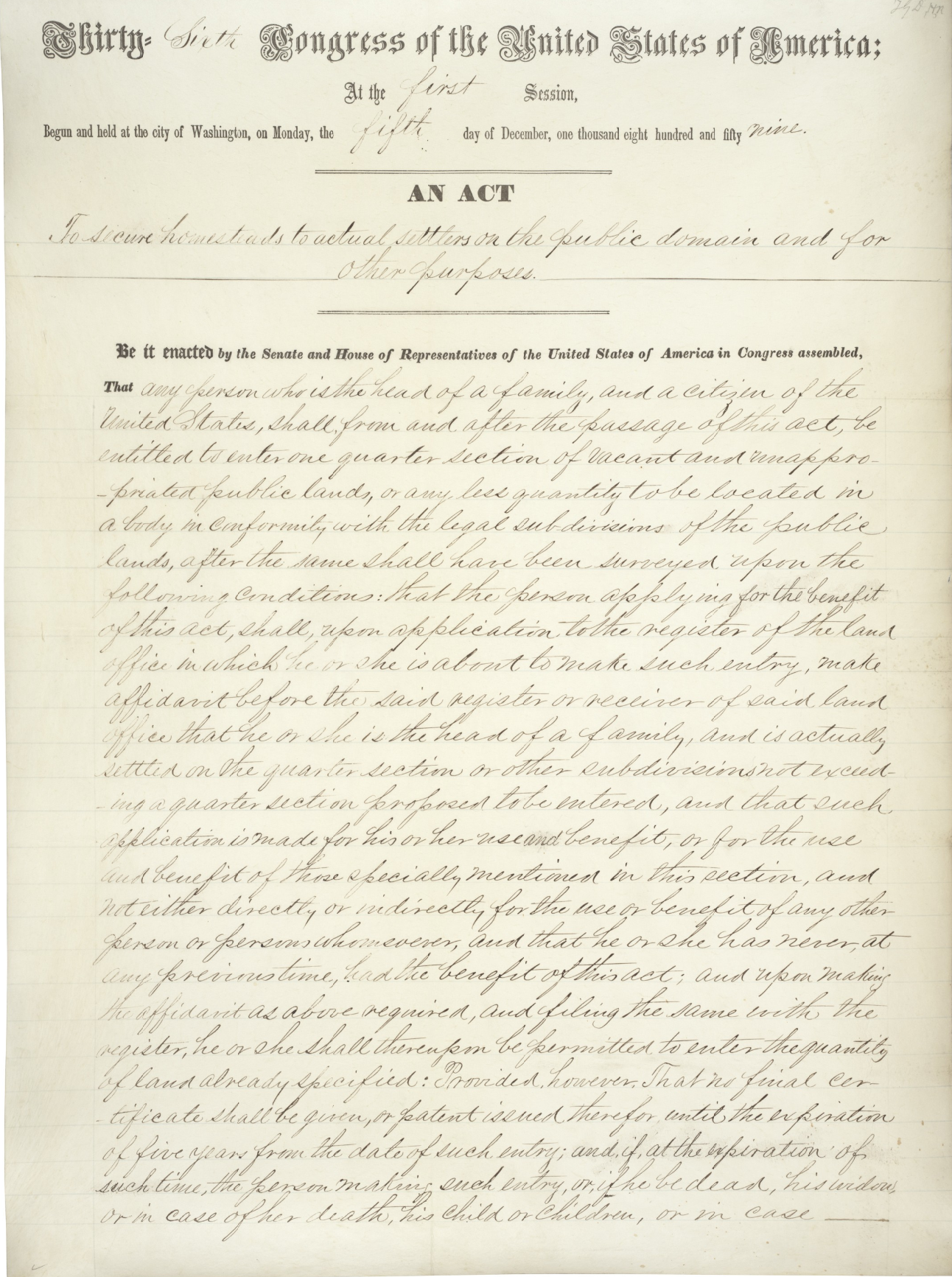
The Homestead Act in the US Senate, 1859

The Homestead Act of 1860 in the United States would have made land available for 25 cents per acre. This act was passed by the United States Congress, but was ultimately vetoed by President James Buchanan.

== Proponents ==
This was at a time where Northerners believed that the federal government should give 160-acre (0.65 km^{2}; 0.25 sq mi) plots of vacant Western land to pioneers for free. People went to the West to start new lives and wanted cheap land.

== Opposition ==
There was much concern about the free land idea. Southerners, who were very pro-slavery, worried that this would result in the West becoming populated with free-soilers. This in turn would create many new anti-slavery states, creating an imbalance in the Senate, destroying the South's control. This was the main reason for Buchanan's veto; he consistently did what the South wanted. Another group who opposed this idea was the Eastern industrialists. They feared employees would be drained into the West for free land.

== See also ==
- Homestead Act (1862)
