= Philip L. Wright Zoological Museum =

Zoological collection at University of Montana

Coordinates: 46°51′30″N 113°59′11″W

The Philip L. Wright Zoological Museum (UMZM) is a natural history facility and zoological collection located on the second floor of the Health Sciences building on the Missoula, Montana campus of the University of Montana.

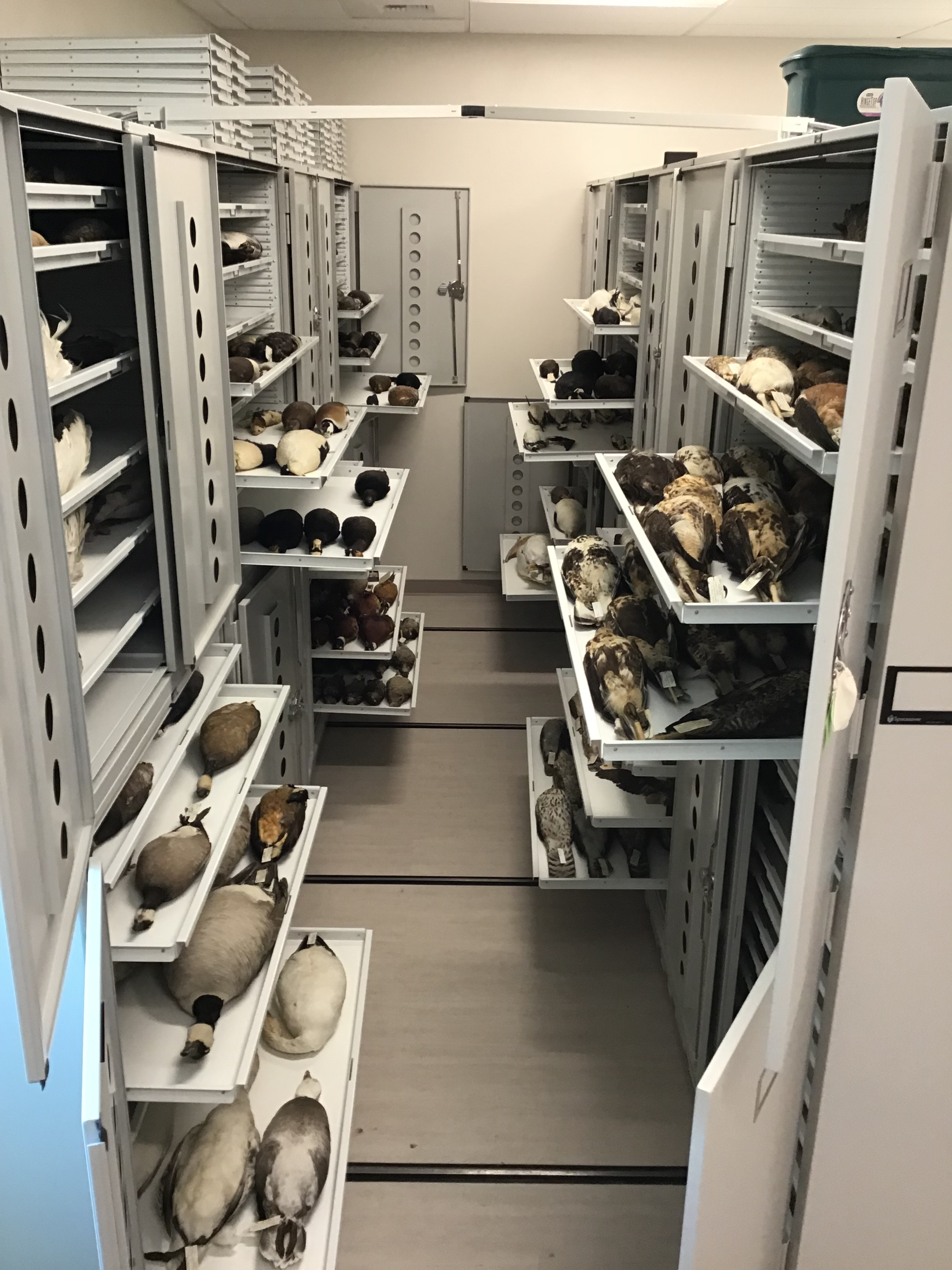
Drawers full of bird study skins at the Philip L. Wright Zoological Museum in 2018 shortly after the renovation.

The UMZM is the largest zoological repository of its kind in the region. Its primary purpose is functioning as an active research facility that is open to all faculty, staff, and students of the university, while also giving tours to hobbyists as well as schools and educational groups. The museums collection consists of 14,500 mammalian, 7,000 avian, and 3,200 fish specimens. It is the largest museum of its kind between Eastern Washington University and Minneapolis, Minnesota, and houses one of the most extensive representations of Northern Rocky Mountain wildlife in the world. In addition to actively studying and documenting native species, the museum includes a wide variety of specimens from all over the globe, with the oldest dating from Leningrad, Russia, 1851. In early 2012, a volunteer curatorial assistant for the museum, Emily Graslie, hosted a series of videos on YouTube called The Brain Scoop exhibiting the various specimens the museum holds; the show has since moved to Chicago's Field Museum.

The University of Montana started its collections in the 1890s with contributions from such renowned individuals as Morton J. Elrod, who was an early founding biologist, professor, and researcher at the University of Montana, and who also founded the Flathead Lake Biological Research Station in 1899. On September 1, 1939, the museum came under the direction of Dr. Philip L. Wright, who adamantly pursued collections until his death in 1997. That same year the university renamed the museum in honor of Dr. Wright's diligent efforts. Until recently it was under the direction of curator David L. Dyer; Dr. Angela Hornsby became the curator as of July 2019 and left in October 2023. In January 2025, Katrina Derieg became the curator. It is otherwise staffed by undergraduate interns and volunteers.
