= Flathead Lake Biological Station =

Research station run by the University of Montana

- Established: 1899
- Research type: Research; Education
- Field of research: Biology; Environmental science
- Director: Jim Elser
- Faculty: Matthew Church; Bob Hall; Gordon Luikart; Rachel Malison; Clint Muhlfeld
- Location: 32125 Bio Station Ln, Polson, Montana, 59860, United States; 47°52′36″N 114°01′59″W
- Operating agency: University of Montana
- Website: Flathead Lake Bio Station

Flathead Lake Biological Station (FLBS) is a research station run by the University of Montana in Yellow Bay, Flathead Lake, Polson, Montana. It was first established by American ecologist and professor Morton John Elrod in 1899 on the Swan River near Bigfork. In 1909, it was moved to its current location. Year-round research began in 1967. Areas of ongoing research includes lake ecology, conservation genomics, stream, river, and floodplain ecology, microbial ecology, aquatic invasive species, and sensors and sensor networks. It is the second oldest biological field station in the United States, and the longest running freshwater field station in year-round operation in North America.

== History ==
Montana was admitted to the Union in 1889. The University of Montana at Missoula, a public research university, received its charter in 1893, opening in 1895. Morton J. Elrod, the first biologist at the new university, began teaching in 1897. He made preparations for a new research station in the western area of Montana in the spring of 1899, spending a week looking for appropriate sites. At the time, the only biological field station in the Rocky Mountain region was the New Mexico Biological Station established by Theodore Dru Alison Cockerell.

Several factors contributed to Elrod's decision to choose a site for a research station, particularly the ease of transportation by railroad and boat for researchers. Visitors could access the general area of the site by the Great Northern and Northern Pacific Railway, but still needed stagecoaches and steamboats to complete the trip. Elrod envisioned an educational summer program for students, teachers, and members of the community. He wanted to build a research station for the purpose of studying biology with a focus on scientific questions of natural history for the benefit of the university, the museum, and the state. The State Board of Education accepted the plan and the station was given departmental status and funding. The first location chosen for the station was in the town of Bigfork, on the north end of Flathead Lake, near the banks of the Swan River. With financial support and contributions, the station was completed that summer. The original station in Bigfork had a field laboratory with equipment that could host twelve students, a dark room, a room for storage, and three boats.

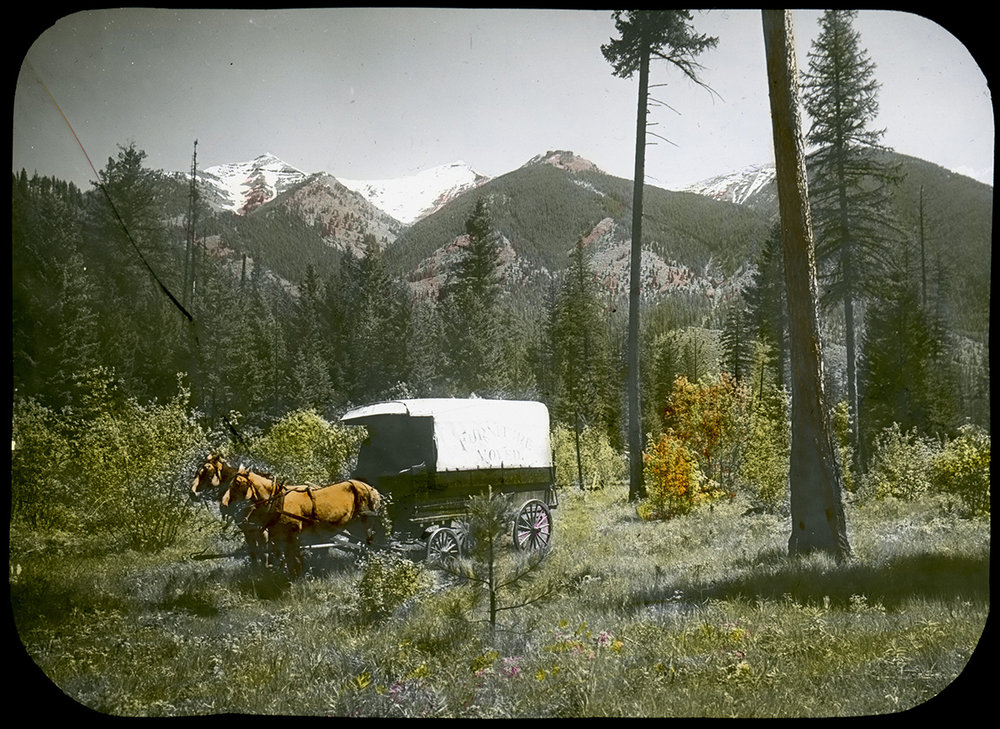
Yellow Bay Biological Station, 1903. In its early years, researchers traveled by train to get close to Flathead Lake, but still needed to take a stagecoach and a steamboat for the last leg of the trip.

Elrod soon began thinking bigger and more long-term. With the help of Montana politician Joseph M. Dixon (1867–1934), Congress passed the 1904 Flathead Allotment Act, which granted the station 160 acres (65 ha) for research purposes, 80 of which was set aside for what would become the new station on Yellow Bay, 40 for part of Bull Island, and 40 for Wild Horse Island, which was exchanged for the "South Forty" on Polson Bay. Later, land on Bird Islands was added for research use. Elrod believed the station at Yellow Bay provided a unique vantage point for scientific research in the U.S., with a mix of "lakes, rivers, mountains, [and] forests, at elevations from 3,000 to 10,000 feet (910 to 3,050 m)." The station was moved from Bigfork to Yellow Bay in 1909. Elrod promoted the station as offering opportunities for both recreation and serious research. The station was productive, producing 360 printed pages of research in just the first six summers.

The station faced funding scarcities in the 1920s and 1930s leading to only a few summer sessions in those decades, but research continued in partnership with the Montana Fish and Game Commission. Activity resumed in the 1940s and in the post-WWII era, with federal grant money paving the way for new infrastructure and improvements to the station. The scope of research expanded in the 1950s to include mammals. Year-round research began in 1967, with the Morton. J. Elrod Laboratory constructed in 1968. Monitoring programs were updated to modern scientific standards in 1977. The Schoonover Freshwater Research Laboratory was built in 1981, giving the station the tools to perform chemical water analyses onsite. The year-round dormitory and commissary complex was finished in 1986. FLBS is the second oldest biological field station in the United States, and the "oldest, year-round freshwater field station in North America".

== Research and monitoring ==
Current facilities include more than 60 buildings, with laboratories for biology, limnology, ecology, and other projects. Areas of ongoing research includes lake ecology, conservation genomics, stream, river, and floodplain ecology, microbial ecology, aquatic invasive species, and sensors and sensor networks. It receives research grants from private donors and foundations, and federal grants from the National Science Foundation and NASA. Two environmental sensor networks (LakeNET and RiverNET) monitor and record data from nine meteorological stations. Buoys connected to LakeNET collect data about water quality, wind speed and direction, air temperature, humidity, barometric pressure, and solar radiation. Early-warning station sensors use semi-autonomous, environmental DNA (eDNA) technology known as "Digital Droplet PCR" trackers for real-time DNA detection of aquatic invasive species like quagga (Dreissena rostriformis) and zebra (Dreissena polymorpha) mussels.

== Education ==
Graduate students work on research projects with supervision from FLBS faculty. The station also offers summer courses for both undergraduates and graduates offering education in the field. Current and planned summer courses at the station are offered on conservation ecology, aquatic microbial ecology, field ecology, landscape ecology, UAV remove sensing for field ecology, alpine ecology, stream ecology, cryosphere ecology, evolution of animal behavior, forest and fire ecology, and lake ecology. Eight-week summer internships are open and available for college students. Opportunities for K-12 students are open during the summer and the regular school year through a research education program geared towards aquatic ecology. FLBS has six classrooms, cabins, and dormitories for students and staff, along with a dining and meeting area, and boathouse to host research vessels. "Jessie B", the 30-foot research vessel, is named after Jessie M. Bierman, a protege of Elrod and ardent supporter of FLBS who endowed the first professorship in ecology at the station.

== Partners ==
FLBS is located within the region of the Crown of the Continent Ecosystem (CCE). As such, it is a voluntary part of the Crown Managers Partnership (CMP) connecting the state of Montana with the Canadian provinces of British Columbia and Alberta. The partnership was formalized in 2007. Among other aspects, the management system helps share data and mount an early response to Aquatic Invasive Species (AIS). Other partners include the Confederated Salish and Kootenai Tribes.

== Directors ==
- Morton J. Elrod (1899–1933)
- Joseph. W. Severy (1934–1936)
- Gordon B. Castle (1937–1962)
- Richard A. Solberg (1962–1970)
- John F. Tibbs (1970–1980)
- Jack Stanford (1980–2016)
- Jim Elser (since 2016)
