= South 40 =

American colloquialism

South 40 is an American colloquialism with its origins in the Homestead Act of 1862. Adult heads of families were given 160 acres (0.65 km^{2}) of public land provided they could "prove" (improve) the land by constructing a dwelling of some sort on the land and cultivating the land in some manner. After five years of residence, the deed was transferred to the homesteader. The homesteads, being 160 acres (0.65 km^{2}), were easily divisible into quarters of 40 acres (160,000 m^{2}) each. The south 40 would therefore refer to the south 40 acres (160,000 m^{2}). "South 40" as a name has been used by a multitude of businesses, bands and organizations.

The South 40 is also the name for a section of Washington University in St. Louis's campus. The southernmost 40 acres of campus, this area houses most of the university's freshman and sophomores. The Bear's Den, a university dining hall, and also Bear Necessities, a campus store, can be found on this part of campus.
