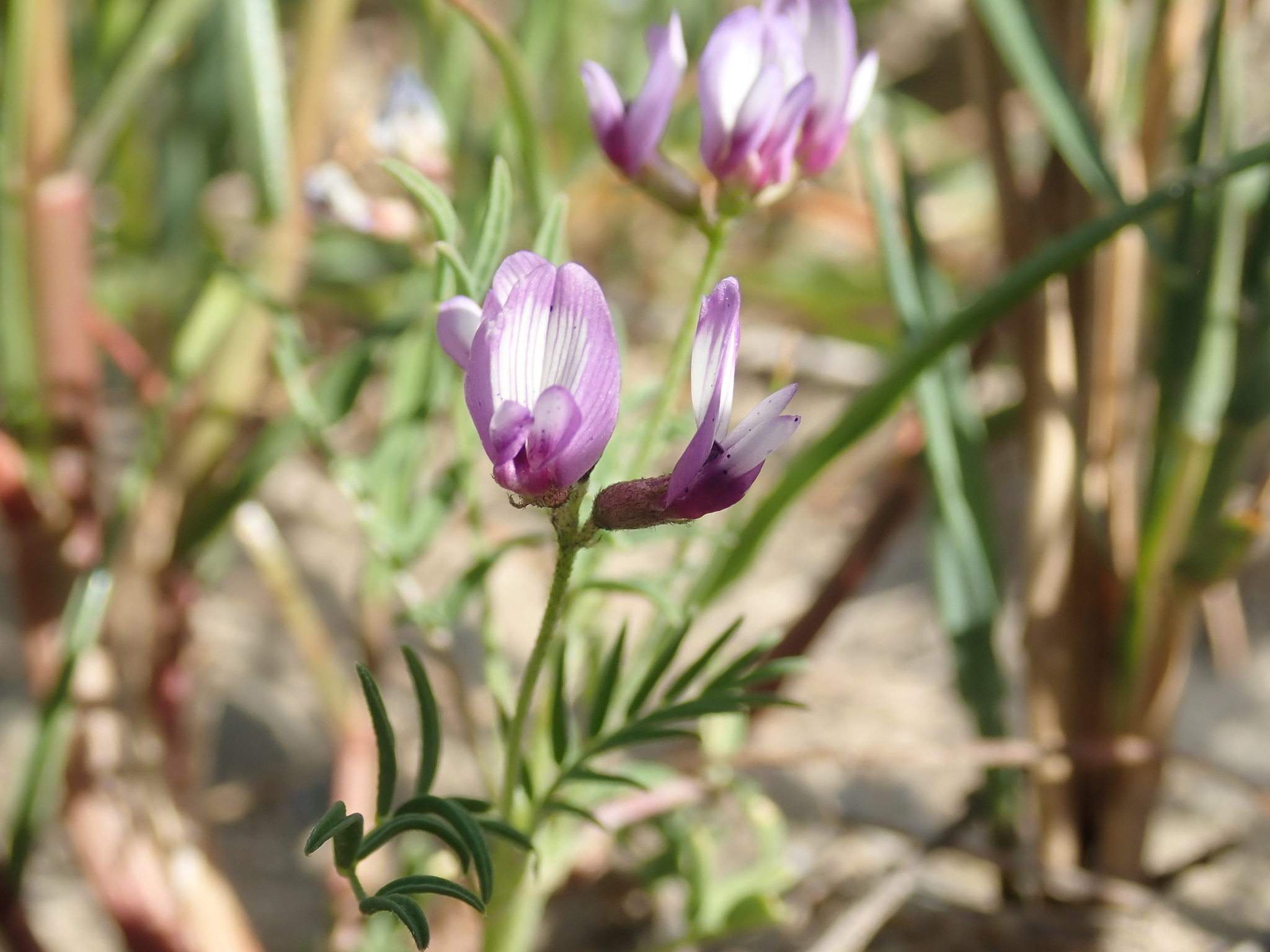

Conservation status
- Imperiled (NatureServe)

Scientific classification
- Kingdom: Plantae
- Clade: Tracheophytes
- Clade: Angiosperms
- Clade: Eudicots
- Clade: Rosids
- Order: Fabales
- Family: Fabaceae
- Subfamily: Faboideae
- Genus: Astragalus
- Species: A. tener

Binomial name
- Astragalus tener A.Gray

= Astragalus tener =

Species of legume

Astragalus tener is a species of milkvetch known by the common name alkali milkvetch. It is endemic to California, where it grows in both coastal and inland areas such as the Central Valley, especially in moist places.

== Description ==
This is an annual herb producing upright stems up to 30 cm (12 in) tall. The leaves are up to 9 cm (3.5 in) in length and made up of several lance-shaped to oval leaflets. The inflorescence is a dense cluster of pinkish-purple white-smudged flowers. The fruit is a narrow legume pod up to 5 cm (2.0 in) long and usually containing two smooth seeds.

=== Varieties ===
There are three varieties of this species. One, the coastal dunes milkvetch, Astragalus tener var. titi, is a rare plant treated as an endangered species on the federal level. It is probably now limited to coastal Monterey County, having been extirpated from its previous range in southern California.

An example occurrence of Astragalus tener is within the two extant forests of Monterey Cypress, Cupressus macrocarpa, in Monterey County, California.
