= Gordon Floyd Ferris =

U.S. entomologist (1893–1958)

- Born: January 2, 1893
- Died: May 21, 1958 (aged 65)
- Spouse: Roxana Judkins Stinchfield Ferris

Gordon Floyd Ferris (January 2, 1893, in Bayard, Kansas – May 21, 1958) was an American entomologist who served as professor of biology at Stanford University from 1912 to 1958 and earned a reputation for his teaching. He founded and edited the journal Microentomology, preferring to work on insects that could only be examined on microscopic slides. He was a specialist on the systematics of the Coccoidea.

Ferris was born in Bayard, Kansas, where his father was a railroad worker. When he was young the family moved to Monticello, Missouri, where they lived in a log cabin. His mother died when he was three and he went to live with his paternal grandparents in La Harpe, Kansas. Leslie, an older brother went to Ottawa and helped Ferris join Ottawa University in 1909. Ferris however was unable to complete studies and planned to join the navy. Leslie found Ferris a job at the Telluride power company. The power company was interested in training its people, mostly at Cornell University. Ferris, however, chose Stanford University in 1912 with a $450 p.a. grant from the power company. While in Ottawa, he was influenced by Vernon Kellogg's American Insects. Ferris obtaining an A.B. in 1916 and an M.A. in 1918. He became a teaching assistant in entomology at Stanford University. He inculcated skills in specimen preparation and illustration of details among his students. In his early years, he joined the Museum of Vertebrate Zoology on field trips to collect ectoparasites of mammals. He began systematics studies under Vernon Kellogg on Anoplura and also studied Coccidae with Rennie Wilbur Doane.

Ferris was against searches of personal belongings for plant quarantine measures and preferred instead that eradication measures be taken by the government. This led to clashes with other entomologists. Ferris helped found a group of Californian "biosystematists" who influenced each other. As a comparative morphologist he sought rigor in recognizing homology in structures. As a teacher, Ferris was popular. Around the 1940s he insisted that graduate students learn to read technical papers in German. He also taught courses in the philosophy of biology. He guided about 19 students for Ph.D.s and forty-five MA students.

Ferris was an active Sea Scout and was an avid instructor for scouts who came aboard his ship. Ferris's papers are held at the California Academy of Sciences. He was married to botanist Roxana Judkins Stinchfield Ferris.

== Awards ==
- 1925 Guggenheim Fellowship
- 1930–31 Molteno Institute at Cambridge University in England
- 1948–49 Fulbright Fellow in China

== Works ==
Ferris published numerous papers, many in his journal Microentomology. A bibliography was published in the memorial edition of that journal and some additional ones are documented by Leech (1959). Some of the books he wrote include:

- "Contributions toward a Monograph of the Sucking Lice", 1920–1935
- "Atlas of the Scale Insects of North America"
- A catalogue and host list of the Anoplura, California Academy of Sciences, 1916
- Contributions to the Knowledge of the Coccoidea (Homoptera)., The University, 1919
- The Anoplura and Mallophaga of North American mammals, Issue 19, Vernon Lyman Kellogg, Gordon Floyd Ferris, The University, 1915
