= LeRoy Abrams =

American botanist (1874–1956)

Professor LeRoy Abrams
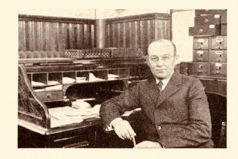
- LeRoy Abrams (Stanford Quad, 1925)
- Born: October 1, 1874; Sheffield, Iowa
- Died: August 15, 1956 (aged 81)
- Occupation(s): Professor, Herbarium Curator
- Employer: Stanford University

LeRoy Abrams (1874–1956) was an American botanist and writer. He was a Professor of Botany at Stanford University. He wrote and illustrated a four-volume Illustrated Flora of the Pacific States, with the final volume published posthumously, after compilation and editing by Roxanna Ferris.

He and his wife had a home overlooking the Santa Clara Valley. Their only child, a daughter, predeceased him.

The standard author abbreviation Abrams is used to indicate this person as the author when citing a botanical name.

== Bibliography ==
- Additions to the Flora of Los Angeles County I. 1902.
- Additions to the Flora of Los Angeles County II. 1903.
- Flora of Los Angeles and Vicinity. 1904.
- Phytogeography of Trees and Shrubs of Southern California. 1908.
- The Gymnosperms Growing On the Grounds of Leland Stanford Jr. University (PDF). 1913.
- Cypress Trees in Southern California. 1914.
- The Floral Features of California. 1915.
- Illustrated Flora of the Pacific States. Vol. 1. Stanford University Press. 1923.
- Illustrated Flora of the Pacific States. Vol. 2. 1944.
- Illustrated Flora of the Pacific States. Vol. 3. 1951.
- Illustrated Flora of the Pacific States. Vol. 4. 1960.
