= Max Yates =

Max Yates may refer to:

- Max Yates (politician)
- Max Yates (American football)
