= Butte Citizens Technical Environmental Committee =

The Butte Citizens Technical Environmental Committee (CTEC) is a Technical Assistance Grant (TAG) organization funded by the U.S. Environmental Protection Agency (EPA) to provide public information and outreach regarding the Silver Bow Creek/Butte Superfund environmental cleanup site and associated sites, acting as an environmental community organization. The organization is based in Butte, Montana. The Silver Bow Creek/Butte Superfund Site is part of the largest Superfund complex in the western United States. Situated in the Clark Fork River Basin, the complex stretches approximately 120 miles from the Warm Spring Ponds area near Butte and Anaconda downstream to the Milltown Dam site east of Missoula. The site was proposed for the Superfund National Priority List (NPL) in 1982, with final designation in 1983.

== Organization history and operations ==
CTEC dates back to the first EPA TAG awarded for the site in 1984. As a TAG group, the organization is managed by a board of volunteer citizens, and has 501(c)(3) status. CTEC has one staff member, a part-time coordinator, and regularly employs independent contractors to provide technical assistance and review regarding site environmental data, Superfund documents, and ongoing cleanup.

The organization provides public information and outreach on the complex history and science of the Silver Bow Creek/Butte site through public events and the CTEC website. CTEC also serves as a point of contact for members of the public with questions about the environmental cleanup of the Butte area, and maintains a repository of Superfund documents at the group's physical office.

CTEC and its members have also publicly expressed questions regarding the efficacy of Superfund cleanup and criticisms of EPA.

== Recent activities ==
In 2012, EPA and the Atlantic Richfield Corporation (ARCO) attempted to discredit public health issues raised by the publication of a PhD dissertation by Dr. Stacie Barry, Coming to the Surface: The Environment, Health and Culture in Butte Montana. CTEC members responded by questioning EPA's reaction to the dissertation and called for additional health studies.

== See also ==
- Butte, MT
- Berkeley Pit
- Anaconda Copper
- Clark Fork (river)
- Milltown Reservoir Superfund Site
- ARCO
- List of Superfund sites in Montana
