= St. John's Episcopal Church (Butte, Montana) =

Church building in Montana, United States

Coordinates: 46°00′47″N 112°32′27″W

St. John's Episcopal Church is the oldest standing church in Butte, Montana.

== History and design ==
The original building, St. John's Episcopal Church, is the oldest standing church in Butte, and one of the oldest in Montana. Faced in Butte granite, St. John's predates St. Patrick's Roman Catholic Church by one year. The church is closely connected to Copper King W.A. Clark, whose mansion is just a block north. The parish hall and basement gymnasium (now a class room and an office) were added in 1917.

For three years after a 1918 fire gutted the interior, services were held in the parish hall, and not until 1931 was the stained-glass window behind the altar restored. That window was executed by Pompeo Bertini, stained-glass artist for the Cathedral of Milan, Italy, and is dedicated to Clark's daughter Jessie, who died at age 2 years, 11 months in 1878. The restoration of the window was paid for by Clark's son William A., Jr., and Jessie's twin sister, Catherine. Additional expansions have included enlarging the chancel and adding the chapel in 1936. Most of the stained glass in the side windows was manufactured by J&R Lamb Studios, of New York and New Jersey, and includes mining and patriotic motifs in addition to traditional religious imagery.

The church is home to 1944, 3-manual, 10-rank. M.P. Moller (Opus 7088), 737-pipe pipe organ, which received a replacement console in 2005. Today the crenellated towers and magnificent stained glass window of St. John's provide an example of the Norman style of the Episcopal Church in the United States.

== Community services ==
The Prayer Shawl Ministry (which meets at Vintage Suites), a ministry of choral and Eucharistic home visits to the sick and shut-ins, referrals to local agencies for various kinds of help
