= World Museum of Mining =

Museum in Butte, Montana

Coordinates: 46°00′35″N 112°33′55″W

The World Museum of Mining is a museum and memorial in Butte, Montana.

Chartered in 1964 as a non-profit educational corporation, the Museum first opened in July 1965. The site, an inactive silver and zinc mine named the Orphan Girl, includes 50 buildings on some 22 acres of land. Copper and zinc were the most common ores found in this mine.
