= 3 Legends Stadium =

Baseball stadium in Butte, Montana

- Location within Montana Location within the United States
- Interactive map of 3 Legends Stadium
- Full name: Miners Field at 3 Legends Stadium
- Address: Copper Mountain Sports Complex; Butte, Montana
- Coordinates: 45°58′41″N 112°32′40″W
- Owner: City and County of Butte-Silver Bow, Montana
- Capacity: 470

Construction
- Opened: May 26, 2017
- Cost: $2.3 million

Tenants
- Butte Miners (American Legion) 2017–present Butte Muckers (American Legion) 2017–present Mining City Tommyknockers (ExL) 2021

3 Legends Stadium is a baseball stadium in Butte, Montana, United States. The ballpark opened in 2017 hosting American Legion baseball and in 2021 welcomed the Mining City Tommyknockers of the summer-collegiate Expedition League. Located at the Copper Mountain Sports Complex, the stadium name honors three long-time supporters of American Legion baseball in Butte. The ballpark's playing field is named Miners Field.

Stadium upgrade plans were announced in October 2020 to "enhance the fan experience." Seating capacity would increase from 470 to 1,300. The planned additional seating and amenities were to include bleachers, a V.I.P. seating area, a 200–300 person party deck in left field, a hot tub section in centerfield, and a children's play area with a zip-line. In April 2021, the county commissioners rejected the hot tub idea due to liability concerns.
