= Bert Mooney Airport =

Airport in Montana, United States

- IATA: BTM; ICAO: KBTM; FAA LID: BTM

Summary
- Airport type: Public
- Owner: Bert Mooney Airport Authority
- Serves: Butte, Montana
- Elevation AMSL: 5,551 ft (1,692 m)
- Coordinates: 45°57′17″N 112°29′51″W
- Website: ButteAirport.com

Maps
- FAA airport diagram as of January 2021
- Location of airport in Montana BTM (the United States)

Runways
Direction	Length		Surface
Direction	ft	m	Surface
15/33	9,000	2,743	Asphalt
12/30	5,100	1,554	Asphalt

Statistics (2022)
- Aircraft operations: 23,861
- Based aircraft: 42
- Source: Federal Aviation Administration

Bert Mooney Airport (IATA: BTM, ICAO: KBTM, FAA LID: BTM) is a public airport three miles southeast of Butte, in Silver Bow County, Montana, United States. It is owned by the Bert Mooney Airport Authority.

The airport name was changed in 1972 to honor Bert Mooney, an aviator from Butte who was the first to fly mail into Yellowstone National Park in 1935. Prior to this the airport was Butte Municipal Airport (from its opening in 1926) and Silver Bow County Airport from 1960 to 1972.

The National Plan of Integrated Airport Systems for 2011–2015 categorized it as a primary commercial service facility (more than 10,000 enplanements per year). Montana Department of Transportation records say the airport had 32,501 passenger boardings (enplanements) in 2023.

== Facilities ==
Bert Mooney Airport covers 890 acres (360 ha) at an elevation of 5,551 feet (1,692 m). It has two asphalt runways: 15/33 is 9,000 by 150 feet (2,743 x 46 m) and 11/29 is 5,100 by 75 feet.

In 2022 the airport had 23,861 aircraft operations, average 65 per day: 87% general aviation, 8% air taxi, 3% commercial service and 3% military. 42 aircraft were then based at this airport: 30 single-engine, 9 multi-engine, and 3 helicopter.

== Airlines and destinations ==
=== Passenger Service ===
Airlines	Destinations
Delta Connection	Salt Lake City
United Express	Denver

Bert Mooney gained a second destination airport, Denver International Airport, in 2022. The service to Denver was suspended shortly afterwards due to a pilot shortage. Service to Denver resumed in January 2025.

== Statistics ==
Top domestic destinations (May 2025 – April 2026)
Rank	Airport	Passengers	Airline
1	Denver, CO	13,030	United Express
2	Salt Lake City, UT	10,380	Delta Connection

Destinations from Bert Mooney Airport

== Accidents ==
On November 7, 1950, a Northwest Orient Airlines plane carrying 21 people crashed into the East Ridge of Butte during a blizzard. All on board were killed.

On March 22, 2009, a Pilatus PC-12 flying in from Oroville, California, crashed in Holy Cross Cemetery 500 feet from the airport, killing all 14 passengers and crew on board.

== See also ==
- List of airports in Montana
