= Venus Alley, Butte =

Former red-light district in Butte, Montana

Coordinates: 46°00′42″N 112°32′02″W

Venus Alley (also known as Whore, Peasant and Piss Alley) was a famous red-light district once located in Butte, Montana in the United States. It flourished from the late 19th century through the early 20th century and was one of the last openly tolerated urban prostitution districts in the American West, along with the one in Reno, Nevada. It was closed in the 1970s.

== History ==
Venus Alley rose in the 1880s during the heyday of Butte as a wide-open copper-mining town, full of hundreds of saloons and gambling halls. The block-long district was located in the center of town off Wyoming Street. The name "Venus Alley" came from the rear entrance of the famous Dumas Brothel, one of the longest running houses of prostitution in the U.S. The brick-lined alley was lined with "cribs", overhung with a single white light bulb over each entrance. Although made illegal in 1890 by the city fathers, the establishments continued to operate by bribery of the city police.

The north side of the alley was lined with the famous "double-deckers", where the alley-level cribs had a second row of cribs above them reached via wooden planks. The women who worked the cribs typically wore brightly colored and short-skirted dresses, and would stand in the windows to attract customers. The cribs were equipped with call boxes for ordering drinks or food from nearby bars and noodle parlors.

In 1903, prostitution was regulated in Butte. The women were ordered to wear longer dresses with high necklines, and blinds had to be installed in the windows. The prostitutes banded together and protested. Street solicitation was banned, so doorways were opened up into the cribs and passageways built between them, creating a labyrinth off the street where the women continued to solicit.

The area expanded in around 1916 when the price of copper rose to a new high, but was closed down the following year by federal law designed to protect WW1 soldiers from venereal disease. However, prostitution continued underground.

The area reopened in the 1930s, and a screening fence erected at the end of the alley to keep the activities hidden from public view. In 1943, prostitution was prohibited in Butte, and the cribs closed down, although the more discreet brothels continued to operate.

== Decline ==
After WW2 the cribs reopened, but were demolished in 1954, following the city's designation as a National Historic Landmark the year before. The Windsor Hotel, a brothel, was closed by arson in 1968. Its madam, Beverly Snodgrass, went to Washington to complain to her senator about the loss of her income. She claimed she had been paying the Butte police $700 a month for protection. Senator Mike Mansfield decided this was a local matter not a federal one. Following an eight part series on vice in the Great Falls Tribune, the remaining three brothels in Butte closed. The Dumas Brothel soon reopened and continued to operate until 1982. Its closure coincided with the closure of the last copper mine in the area.

The structure of the Dumas Brothel, as well as the brick-lined alley, still stands in uptown Butte and has become a tourist attraction.

== Sources ==
- Baumler, Ellen (1998). "Devil's Perch: Prostitution from Suite to Cellar in Butte, Montana". Montana: The Magazine of Western History. 48 (3): 4–21.
- Gibson, Richard I. (2012). Lost Butte, Montana. Arcadia Publishing. ISBN 9781614238195.
- Gulliford, Andrew (2005). Preserving Western History. UNM Press. ISBN 9780826333100.
- MacKell, Jan; Collins, Jan MacKell (2009). Red Light Women of the Rocky Mountains. UNM Press. ISBN 9780826346100.
- Miller, Wilbur R. (2012). The Social History of Crime and Punishment in America: An Encyclopedia. SAGE Publications. ISBN 9781483305936.
- Vickers, Marques (2017). The Red-Light District of Butte Montana: The Decadence and Dissolution Of A Local Institution. Marquis Publishing.
