= Max Yates (politician) =

American politician

Member of the Montana House of Representatives from the 74 district
- In office 2011 to 2013

Personal details
- Party: Republican

Max Yates is a Republican member of the Montana Legislature. He was elected to House District 74 which represents the Butte area.
