= History of Butte, Montana =

American municipal history

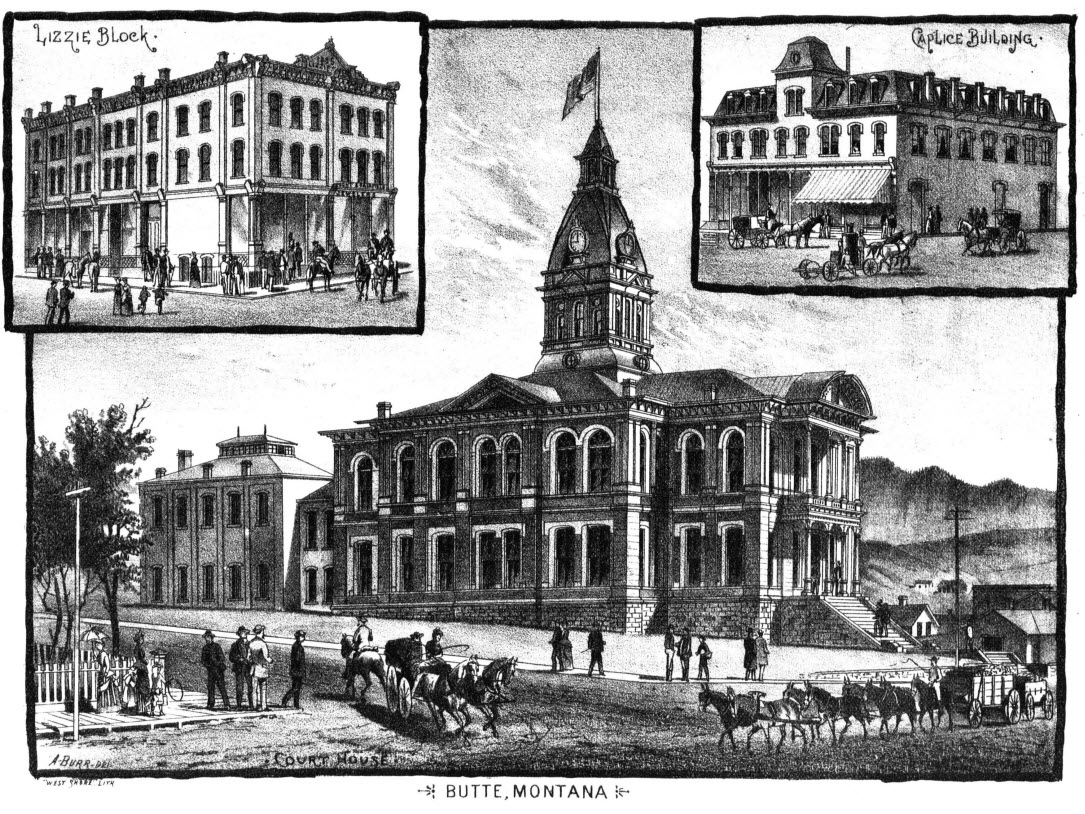
Original Butte courthouse, 1885.

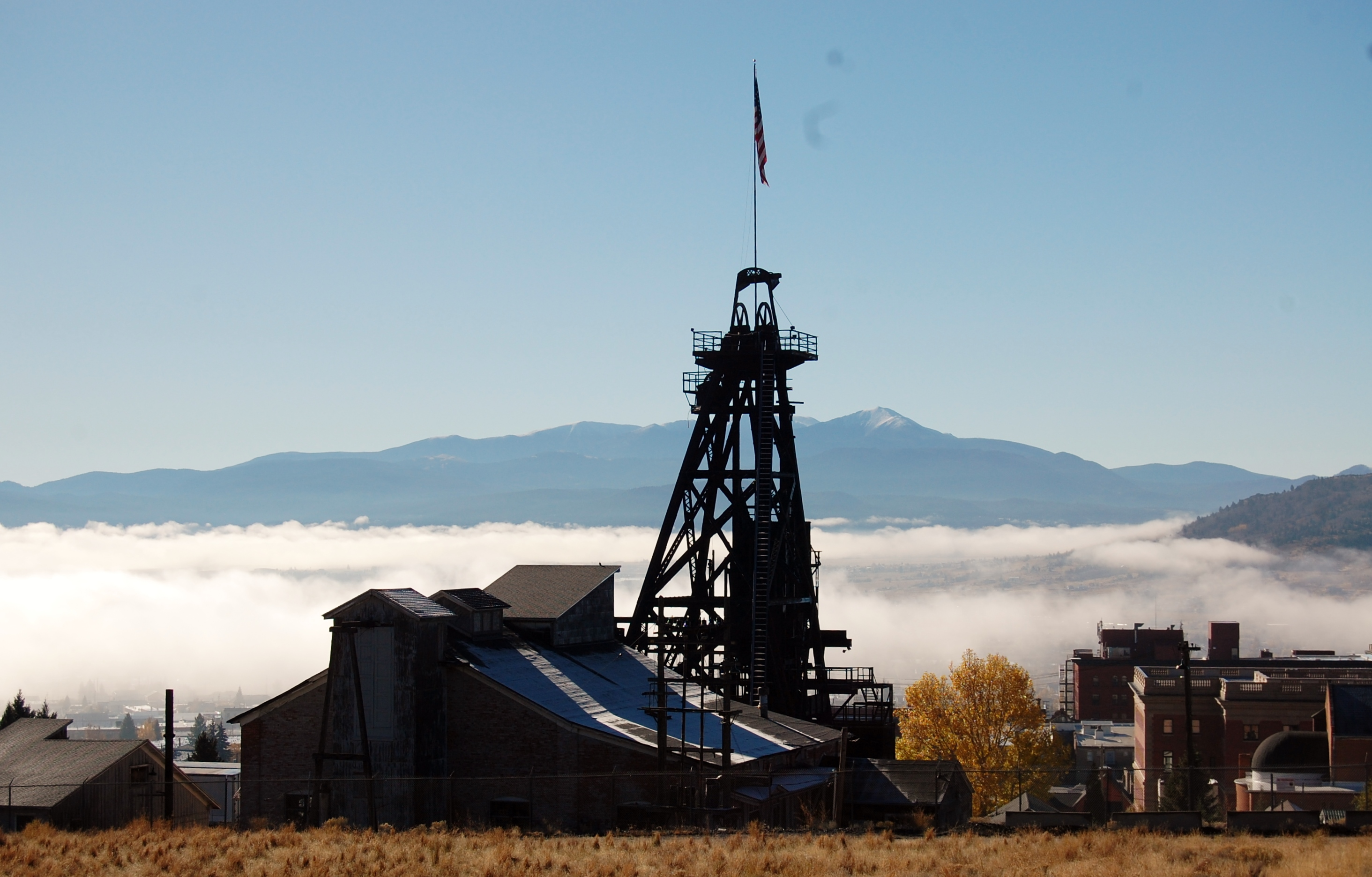
A headframe overlooking Butte.

Butte is a city in southwestern Montana established as a mining camp in the 1860s in the northern Rocky Mountains straddling the Continental Divide. Butte became a hotbed for silver and gold mining in its early stages, and grew exponentially upon the advent of electricity in the late-nineteenth century due to the land's large natural stores of copper. In 1888 alone, mining operations in Butte had generated an output of $23 million. The arrival of several magnates in the area around this time, later known as the "Copper Kings," marked the beginning of Butte's establishment as a boomtown.

The city was also the site of various political events relating to is industrial roots and expansive workforce, and was home to strong labor activism and Socialist movements in the early-twentieth century. After numerous mining-related disasters (including the 1917 Speculator Mine disaster the largest hard rock mining disaster in world history), and a steady decline in copper demand, Butte's Anaconda Copper company shifted to open-pit mining in the mid-twentieth century. Over several decades, mining took place at the Berkeley Pit before operations were ceased in 1983. Post-millennium economic forces in Butte have largely centered on technology and the health industry, as well as efforts to preserve the city's historic buildings and cultural sites. In 2002, Butte was one of only twelve towns in America to be named a Distinctive Destination by the National Trust for Historic Preservation.

== History ==
=== Prehistoric era and native history ===
The land on which Butte was established is positioned in the Silver Bow Creek Valley (or Summit Valley), a natural bowl sitting high in the Rocky Mountains straddling the Continental Divide. The southwestern side of the bowl is made of a large mass of granite known as the Boulder Batholith, which dates to the Cretaceous era.

The land surrounding Butte around Silver Bow Creek was a hunting and fishing area for the local Interior Salish peoples who had settlements to the northwest, near Missoula. The creek's name originates from the Salish "Sin-tahp-kay-Sntapqey" (transl. Place Where Something is Shot in the Head).

=== 1860–1888: Establishment and immigration ===
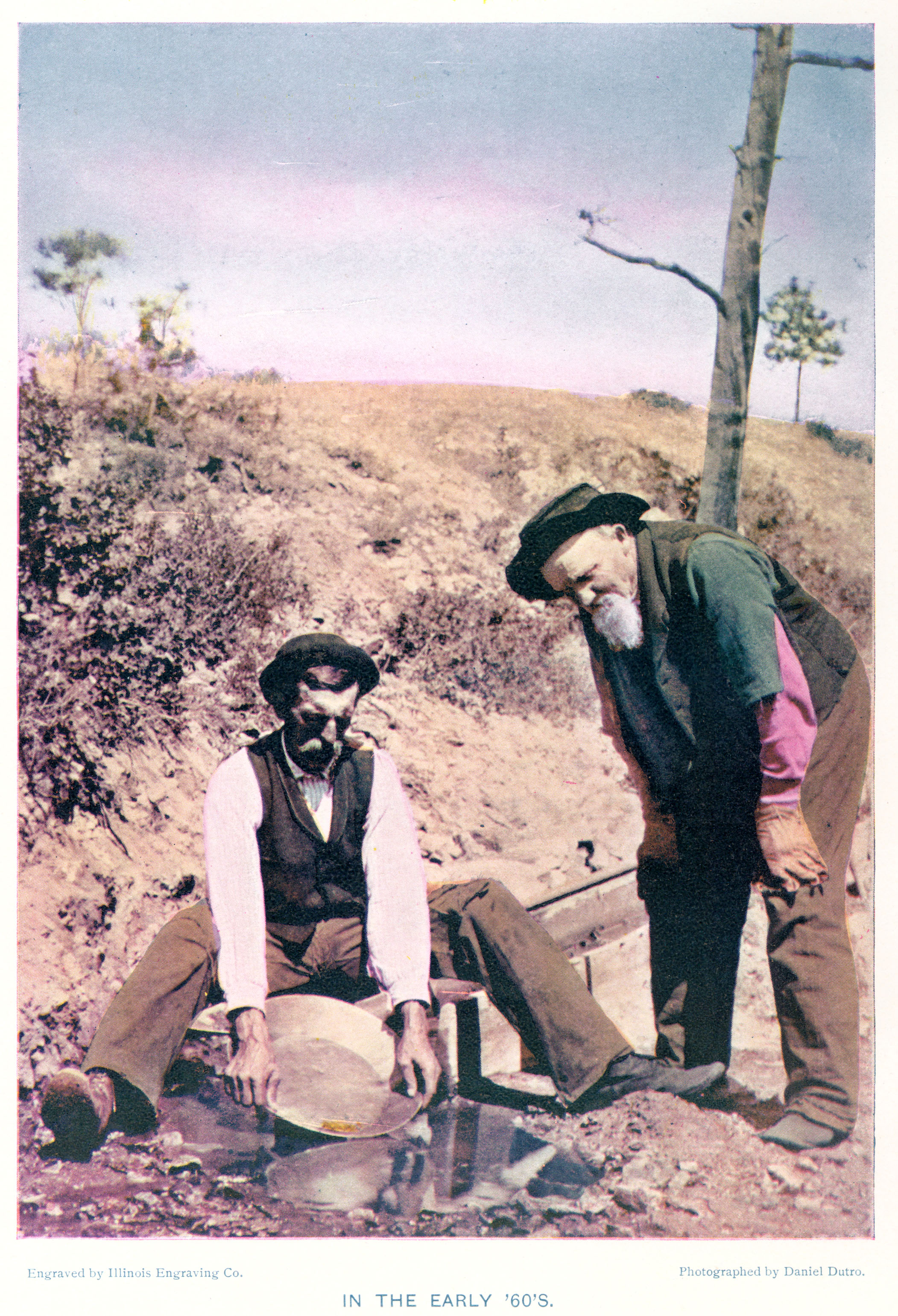
Mining prospectors in Montana, c. 1880s–1890s.

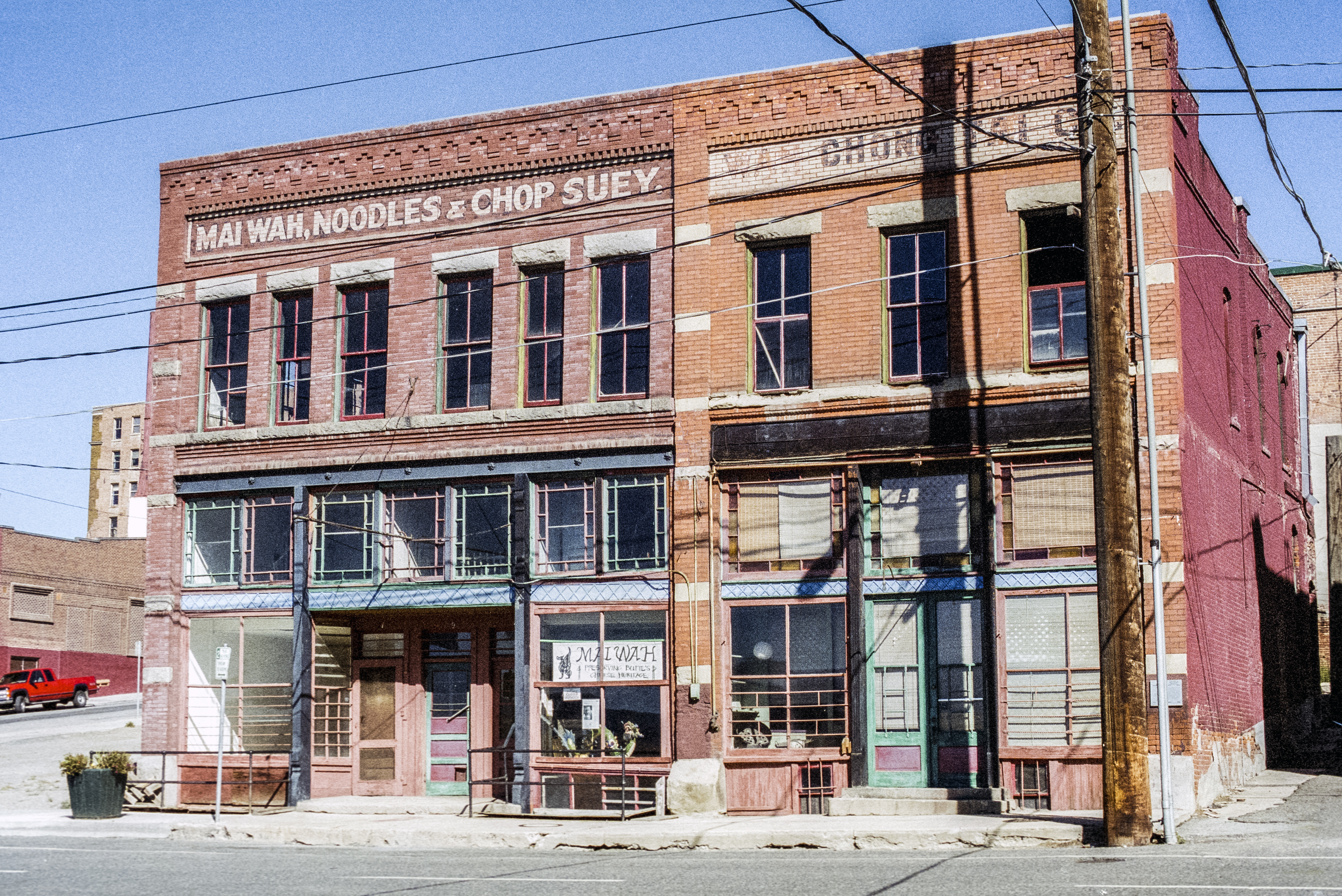
The Wah Chong Tai building housed one of the city's earliest Chinese-owned businesses.

Butte began as a mining camp in the 1860s. Early map drawings of Butte sometimes referred to the settlement as "Butte City." In 1874, William L. Farlin staked the Asteroid Mine (later known as the Travona), and was followed by an influx of additional miners seeking gold and silver. The mines attracted workers from Cornwall (United Kingdom), Ireland, Wales, Lebanon, Canada, Finland, Austria, Serbia, Italy, China, Syria, Croatia, Montenegro, Mexico, and all areas of the United States. The legacy of the immigrants lives on in the form of the Cornish pasty which was popularized by mine workers who needed something easy to eat in the mines, the povitica—a Slavic nut bread pastry which is a holiday favorite sold in many supermarkets and bakeries in Butte—and the boneless porkchop sandwich. These, along with huckleberry products and Scandinavian lefse have arguably become Montana's symbolic foods, known and enjoyed throughout Montana. In the ethnic neighborhoods, young men formed gangs to protect their territory and socialize into adult life, including the Irish of Dublin Gulch, the Eastern Europeans of the McQueen Addition, and the Italians of Meaderville (Butte's Irish Catholic community has been notably longstanding: As of 2017, the city has the highest percentage of Irish Americans per capita of any city in the United States).

Among the migrants, many Chinese workers moved in, and amongst them set up businesses that led to the creation of a Chinatown in Butte. The Chinese migrations stopped in 1882 with the passage of the Chinese Exclusion Act. There was anti-Chinese sentiment in the 1870s and onwards due to racism on the part of the white settlers, exacerbated by economic depression, and in 1895, the chamber of commerce and labor unions started a boycott of Chinese owned businesses. The business owners fought back by suing the unions and winning. The history of the Chinese migrants in Butte is documented in the Mai Wah Museum.

The influx of miners gave Butte a reputation as a wide-open town where any vice was obtainable. The city's famous saloon and red-light district, called the "Line" or "The Copper Block", was centered on Mercury Street, where the elegant bordellos included the famous Dumas Brothel. Behind the brothel was the equally famous Venus Alley, where women plied their trade in small cubicles called "cribs". The red-light district brought miners and other men from all over the region and was open until 1982 as one of the last such urban districts in the United States. Commercial breweries first opened in Butte in the 1870s, and were a large staple of the city's early economy; they were usually run by German immigrants, including Leopold Schmidt, Henry Mueller, and Henry Muntzer. The breweries were always staffed by union workers. Most ethnic groups in Butte, from Germans and Irish to Italians and various Eastern Europeans, including children, enjoyed the locally brewed lagers, bocks, and other types of beer.

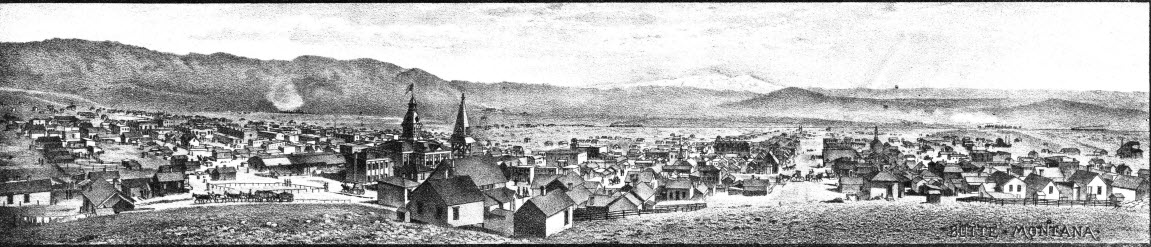
Butte in 1885

=== 1889–1899: Industrial expansion and unionism ===
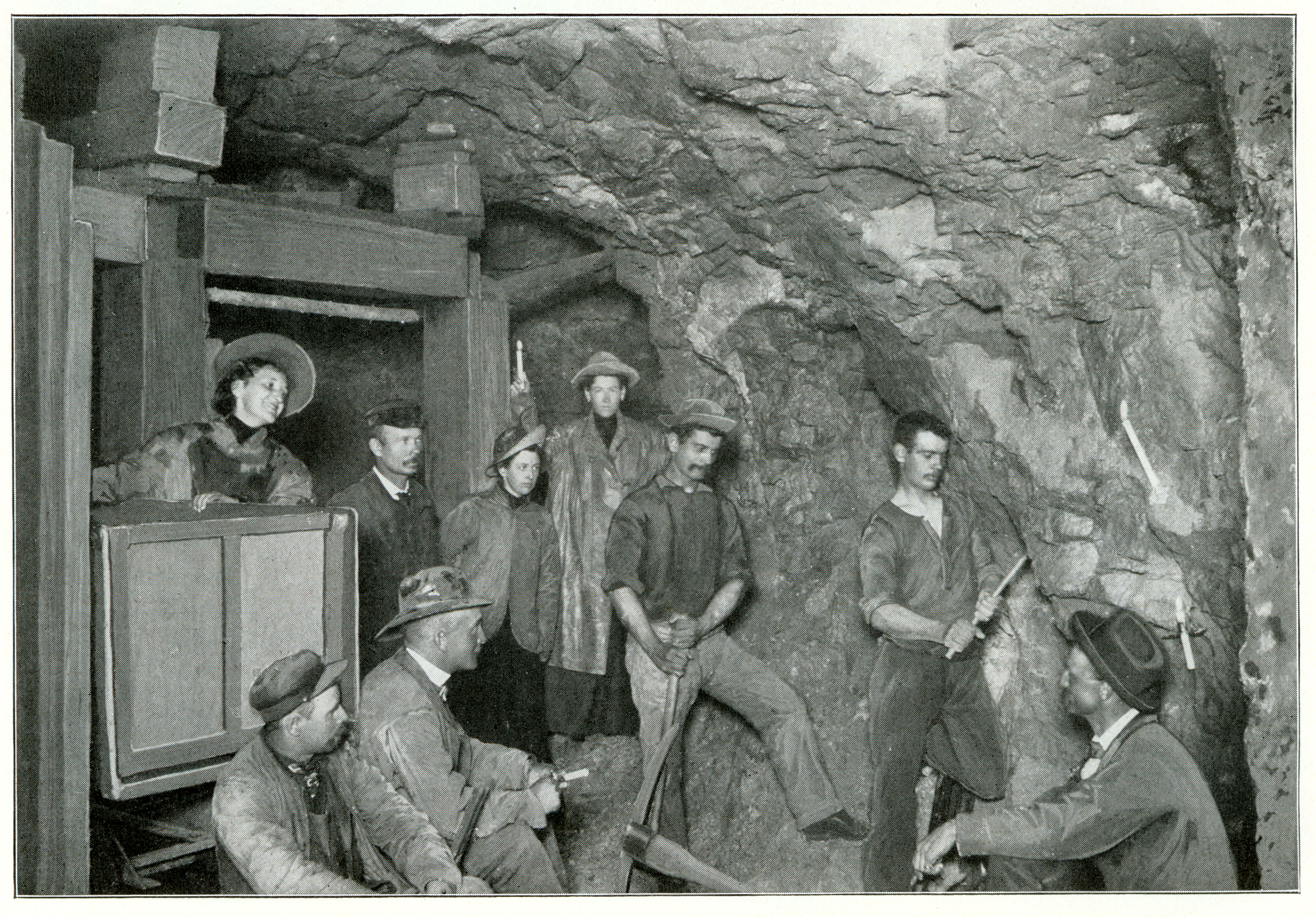
Underground miners in the Parrot Mine c. 1900

In the late nineteenth century, copper was in great demand because of new technologies such as electric power that required the use of copper. Three industrial magnates fought for control of Butte's mining wealth. These three "Copper Kings" were William A. Clark, Marcus Daly, and F. Augustus Heinze. Between 1884 and 1888, Clark constructed the Copper King Mansion in Butte, which became his second residence from his home in New York City. He also, in 1899, purchased the Columbia Gardens, a small park which he developed into a full amusement park, featuring a pavilion, rollercoaster, and a lake for swimming and canoeing. Clark's expansion of the park was intended to "provide a place where children and families could get away from the polluted air of the Butte mining industry." Further cultural developments in the city at this time included the emergence of the Boston and Montana Band, a local marching band that formed on December 22, 1887 by Boston investors Adolph and Leonard Lewisohn and miner Charles X. Larrabee. The city's rapid expansion was noted in an 1889 frontier survey: "Butte, Montana, fifteen years ago a small placer-mining village clinging to the mountain side, has now risen to the rank of the first mining camp of the world... [It] is now the most populous city of Montana, numbering twenty-five thousand active, enterprising, prosperous inhabitants." In 1888 alone, mining operations in Butte had generated an "almost inconceivable" output of $23 million (equivalent to $804,914,815 in 2024) worth of ore.

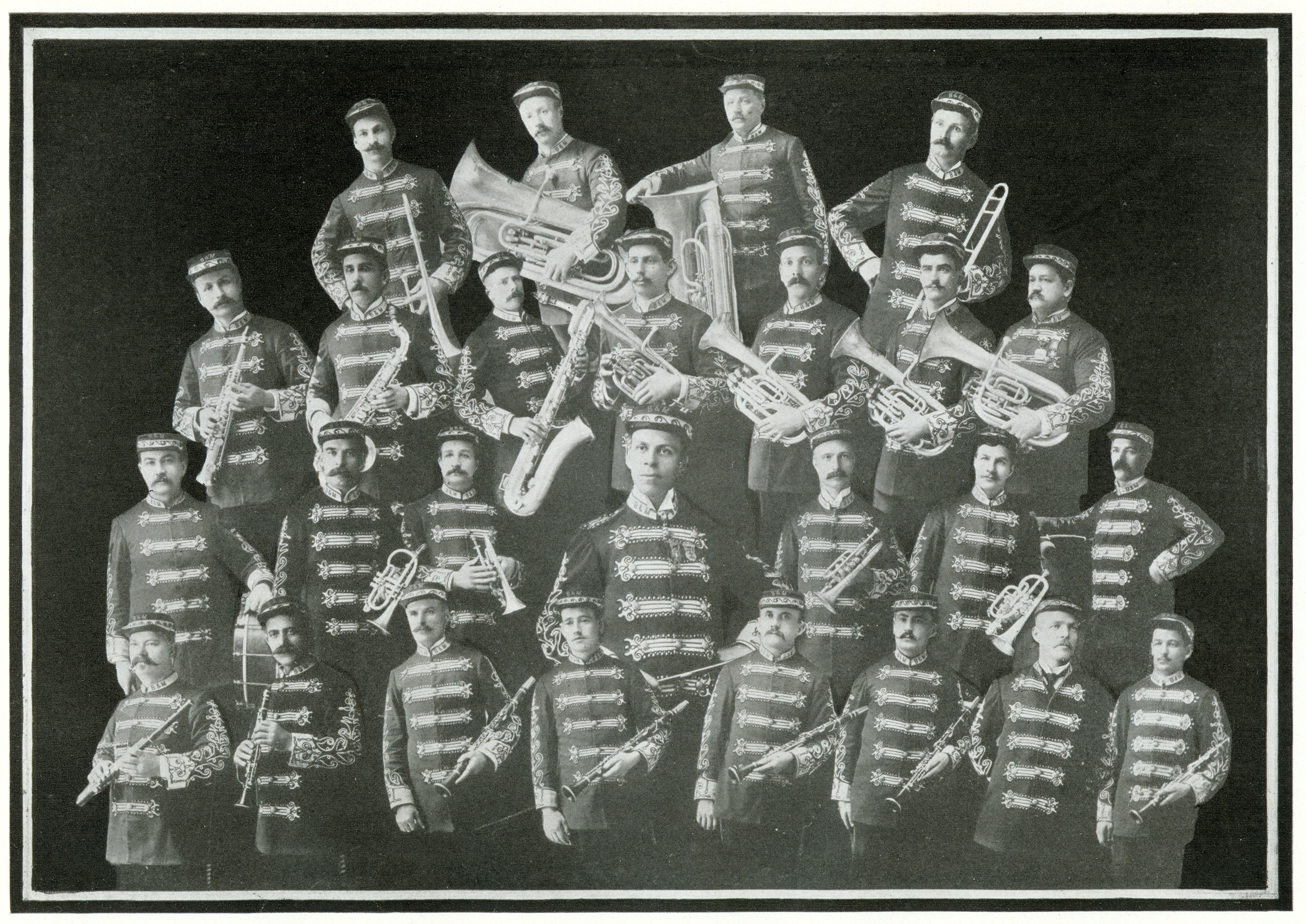
Boston and Montana Band, Butte's longest-standing local band, formed in December 1887.

Around the turn of the twentieth century, prosperous mining had generated considerable wealth in Butte, and at the time was the largest city between Chicago and San Francisco. Copper ore mined from the Butte mining district in 1910 alone totaled 284,000,000 pounds (129,000,000 kg), making it the largest producer of copper in North America and second only to South Africa in world production of metals. The same year, an excess of 10,000,000 ounces (280,000 kg) of silver and 37,000 ounces (1,000 kg) of gold were also discovered. The amount of ore produced in the city earned it the nickname "The Richest Hill on Earth." With its large workforce of miners performing in physically dangerous conditions, Butte was the site of active labor union movements, and came to be known as "the Gibraltar of Unionism."

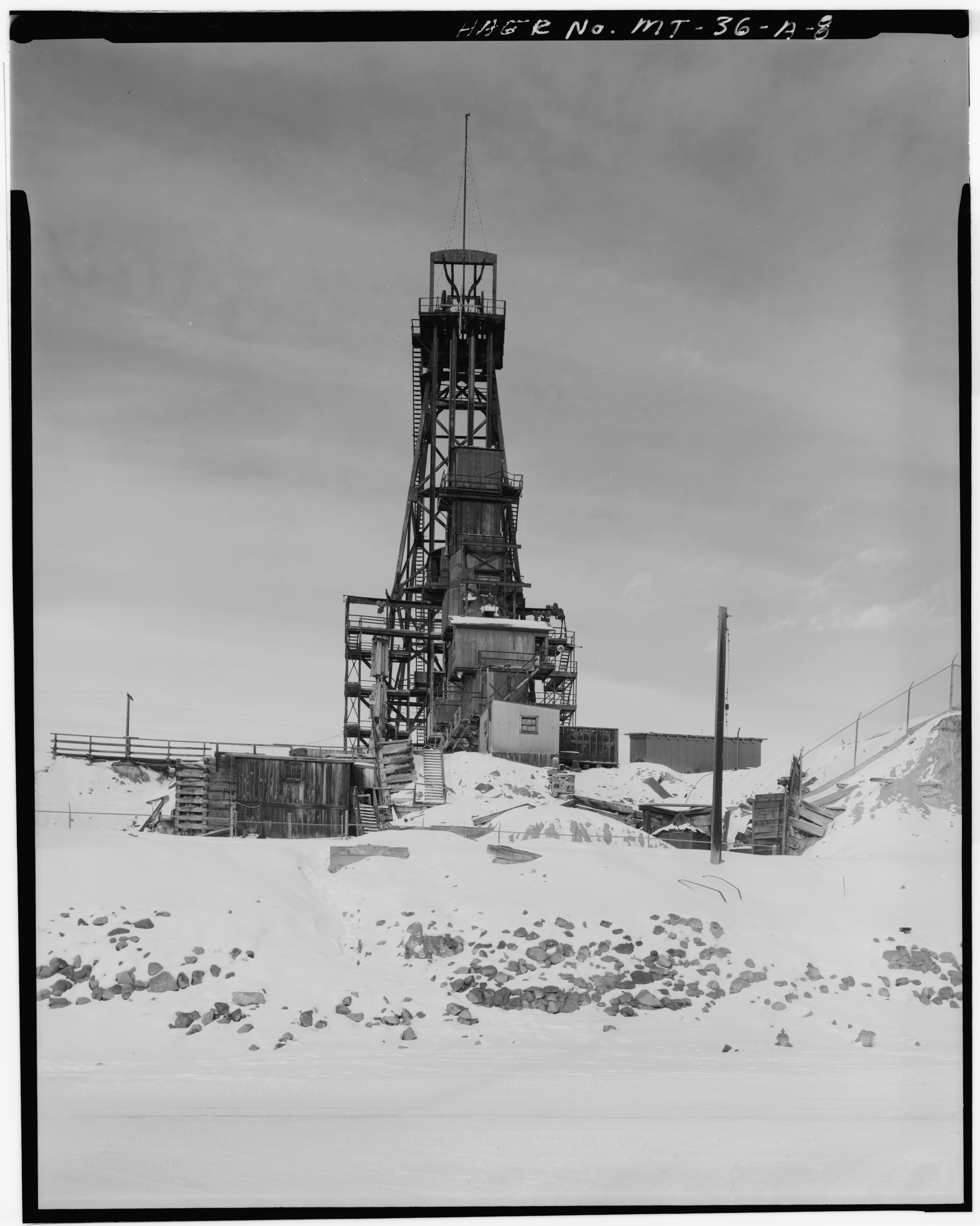
The Anselmo Mine, which opened in 1887.

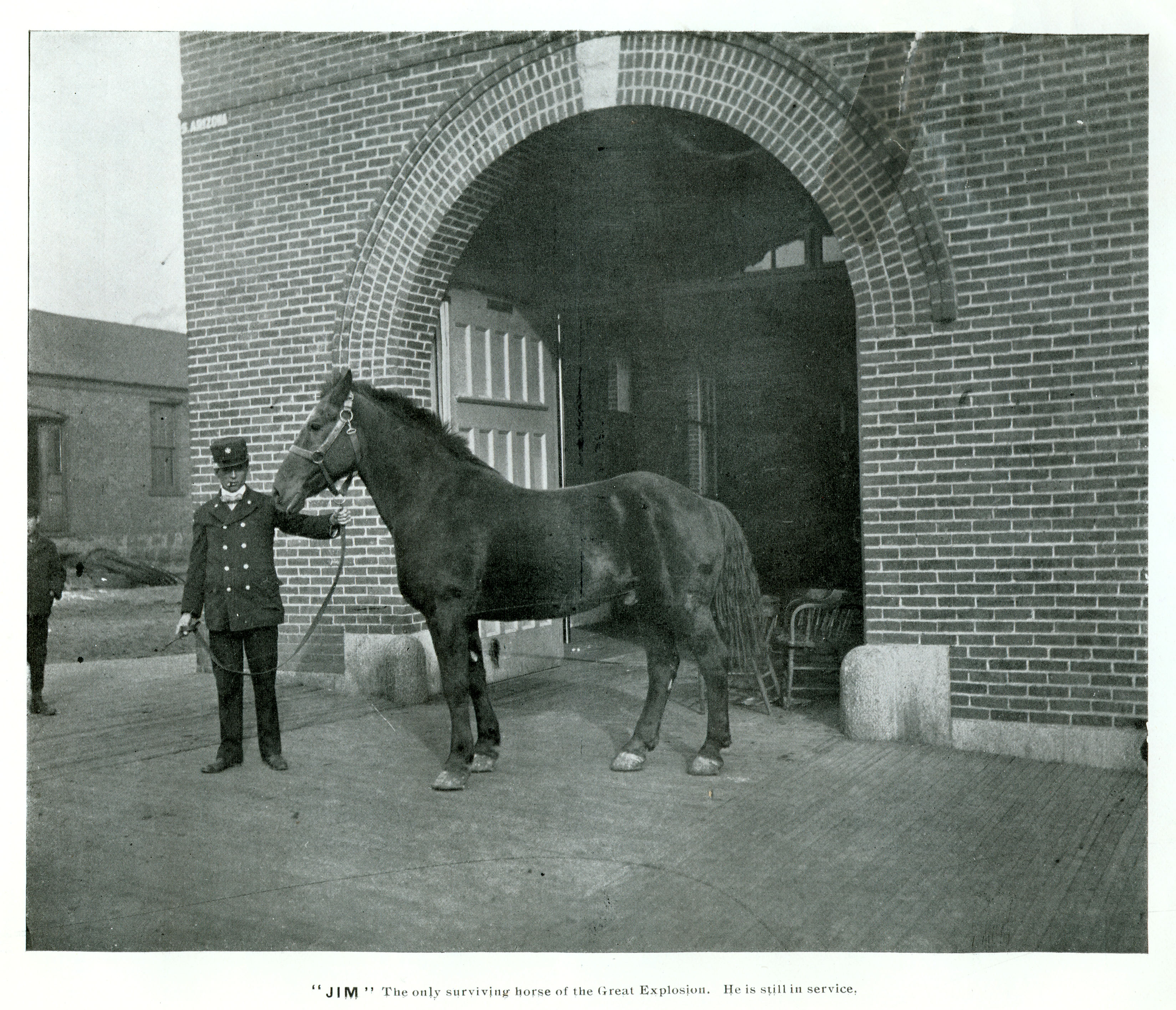
"Jim," the sole surviving horse of the 1895 Kenyon-Connell Warehouse explosion.

By 1885, there were about 1,800 dues-paying members of a general union in Butte. That year the union reorganized as the Butte Miners' Union (BMU), spinning off all non-miners to separate craft unions. Some of these joined the Knights of Labor, and by 1886 the separate organizations came together to form the Silver Bow Trades and Labor Assembly, with 34 separate unions representing nearly all of the 6,000 workers around Butte. The BMU established branch unions in mining towns like Barker, Castle, Champion, Granite, and Neihart, and extended support to other mining camps hundreds of miles away. In 1892 there was a violent strike in Coeur d'Alene. Although the BMU was experiencing relatively friendly relations with local management, the events in Idaho were disturbing. The BMU not only sent thousands of dollars to support the Idaho miners, they mortgaged their buildings to send more.

There was a growing concern that local unions were vulnerable to the power of Mine Owners' Associations like the one in Coeur d'Alene. In May 1893, about forty delegates from northern hard-rock mining camps met in Butte and established the Western Federation of Miners (WFM), which sought to organize miners throughout the West. The Butte Miners' Union became Local Number One of the new WFM. The WFM won a strike in Cripple Creek, Colorado, the following year, but then in 1896–97 lost another violent strike in Leadville, Colorado, prompting the Montana State Trades and Labor Council to issue a proclamation to organize a new Western labor federation along industrial lines. In 1899, Daly joined with William Rockefeller, Henry H. Rogers, and Thomas W. Lawson to organize the Amalgamated Copper Mining Company. Not long after, the company changed its name to Anaconda Copper Mining Company (ACM).

On the evening of January 15, 1895, an explosion occurred at the Kenyon-Connell Warehouse, which killed a total of 57 people (13 of whom were city firefighters) as well as numerous horses and livestock. The explosion was later determined to have been caused by dynamite. A funeral procession of 3,000 people took place for the deceased on January 18, 1895.

=== 1900–1945: Union activity and civil unrest ===
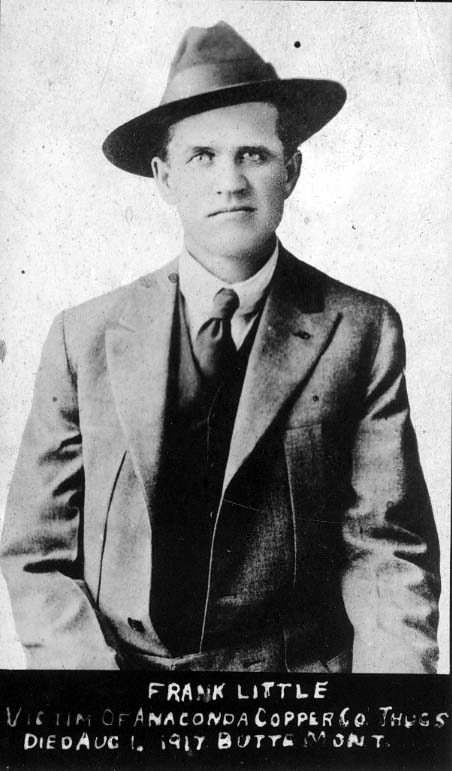
Frank Little, an IWW organizer who was lynched in Butte in 1917.

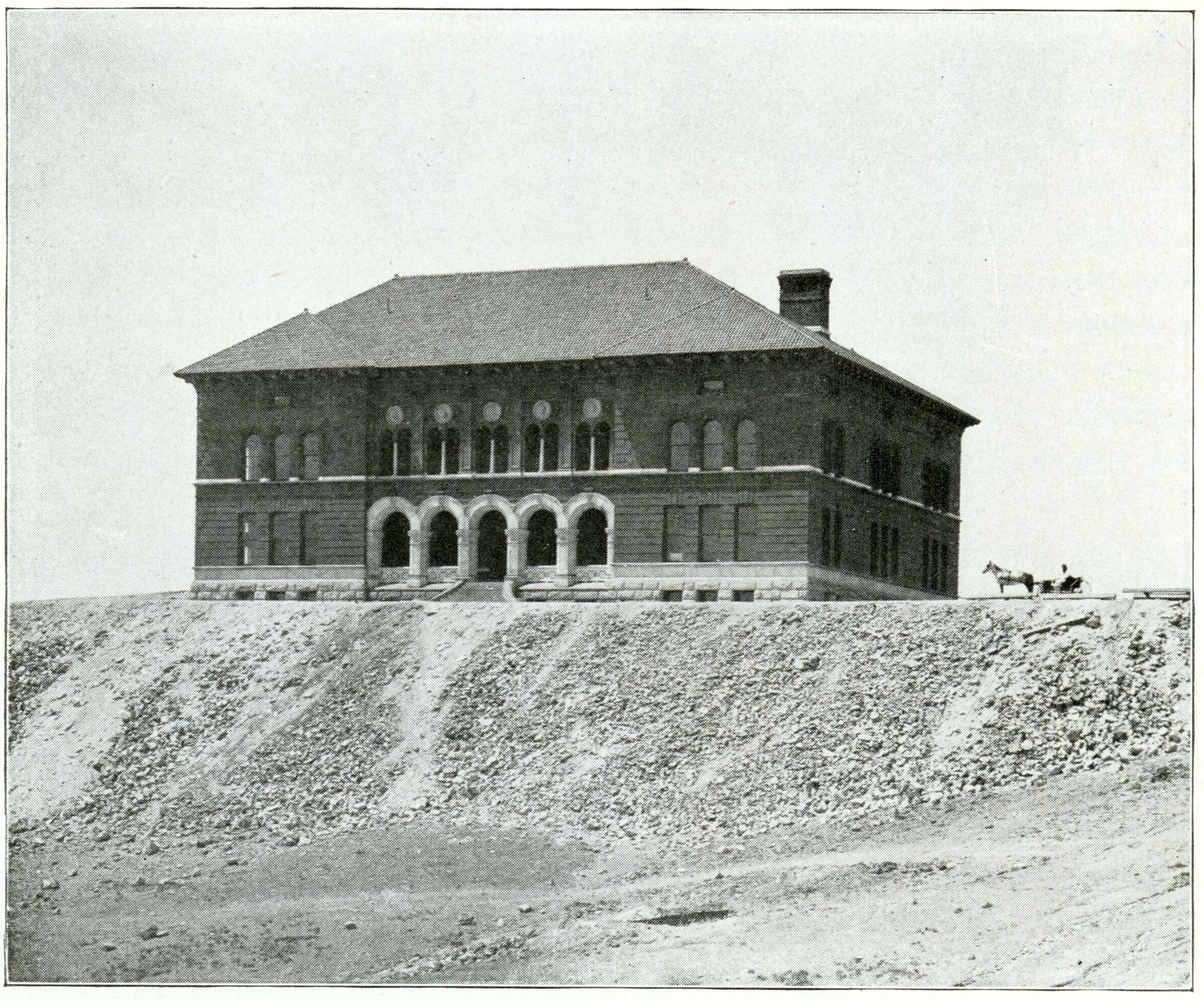
Montana School of Mines, 1900.

In 1900, Butte opened its first institution of higher education, the Montana School of Mines, which is contemporarily Montana Tech of the University of Montana. Between approximately 1900 and 1917, Butte had a strong streak of Socialist politics, even electing a Mayor on the Socialist ticket in 1914. It had also established itself as "one of the most solid union cities in America." After 1905, Butte became a hotbed of Industrial Workers of the World (IWW, or the "Wobblies") organizing. Rivalry between IWW supporters and the WFM locals culminated in the Butte, Montana labor riots of 1914, and resulted in the loss of union recognition by the mine owners. After the dissolution of the Miners' Union, the Anaconda Company attempted to inaugurate programs aimed at enticing employees. However, a number of clashes between laborers, labor organizers, and the Anaconda Company ensued, including the 1917 lynching of IWW executive board officer Frank Little.

Sparked by a tragic accident more than 2,000 feet (600 m) below the ground on June 8, 1917, a fire in the Granite Mountain shaft spewed flames, smoke, and poisonous gas through the labyrinth of tunnels including the connected Speculator Mine. A rescue effort commenced, but the carbon monoxide was stealing the air supply. A few men built man-made bulkheads to save their lives, but many others died in a panic to try to get out. Rescue workers set up a fan to prevent the fire from spreading. This worked for a short time, but when the rescuers tried to use water, the water evaporated, creating steam that burned people trying to escape. Once the fire was out, those waiting to hear the news on the surface could not identify the victims. They were too mutilated to recognize, leading many to assume the worst. Of the 168 bodies removed from the mine, most had died due to lack of oxygen and smoke inhalation as opposed to the actual fire itself. Due to the efforts of men such as Ernest Sullau, Manus Duggan, Con O'Neil, and J. D. Moore, some survived, but the event was the largest hard rock mining accident in history. The Granite Mountain Memorial was built to commemorate those who died in the accident. The disaster was also memorialized in the song, "Rox in the Box" on the album The King is Dead by the indie rock band, The Decemberists.

The loss of miners in the incident sparked additional strikes and protests, as well as the establishment of the Metal Mine Workers Union, which led 15,000 workers to abandon their jobs. In 1917, copper production from the Butte mines peaked and steadily declined thereafter. By WWII, copper production from the ACM's holdings in Chuquicamata, Chile, far exceeded Butte's production. The historian Janet Finn has examined this "tale of two cities"—Butte and Chuquicamata—as two ACM mining towns. In 1920, company mine guards gunned down strikers in the Anaconda Road Massacre. Seventeen were shot in the back as they tried to flee, and one man died. On August 3, 1921, the Montana Federation of Colored Women's Clubs held its inaugural meeting in Butte.

Disputes between miners' unions and companies continued through the 1920s and 1930s in Butte, with several strikes and protests, one of which lasted for ten months in 1921. In 1923, protestors attempted to blow up the Hibernian Hall on Main Street with dynamite. Between 1914 and 1920, the U.S. National Guard occupied Butte a total of six times to restore civility. Further industrial expansions included the arrival of the first mail plane in the city in 1928, and in 1937, the city's streetcar system was dismantled and replaced with bus lines. The city's first airport, Butte Municipal Airport (now Bert Mooney Airport), was constructed south of the city proper in 1927, and operated frequent flights to and from Salt Lake City. In 1933, Northwest Orient Airlines expanded to service the airport from the West Coast and Midwestern states.

=== 1946–1999: Open-pit mining era ===
The copper mines proved to be prosperous until the 1950s, when the declining grade of ore and competition from other mines led the Anaconda Company to switch its focus from the costly and dangerous practice of underground mining to open pit mining. Since the 1950s, five major developments in the city have occurred: the Anaconda's decision to begin open-pit mining in the mid-1950s; a series of fires in Butte's business district in the 1970s; a debate over whether to relocate the city's historic business district; a new civic leadership; and the end of copper mining in 1983. In response, Butte looked for ways to diversify the economy and provide employment. The legacy of over a century of environmental degradation has, for example, produced some jobs. Environmental cleanup in Butte, designated a Superfund site, has employed hundreds of people.

Thousands of homes were destroyed in the Meaderville suburb and surrounding areas, McQueen and East Butte, to excavate the Berkeley Pit, which opened in 1954 by Anaconda Copper. At the time, it was the largest truck-operated open pit copper mine in the United States. The Berkeley Pit grew with time until it bordered the Columbia Gardens. After the Gardens caught fire and burned to the ground in November 1973, the Continental Pit was excavated on the former park site. In 1977 the ARCO (Atlantic Richfield Company) company purchased Anaconda, and only three years later started shutting down mines due to lower metal prices. In 1982, all mining in the Berkeley Pit was suspended. In 1983, an organization of low income and unemployed residents of Butte formed to fight for jobs and environmental justice; the Butte Community Union produced a detailed plan for community revitalization and won substantial benefits, including a Montana Supreme Court victory striking down as unconstitutional State elimination of welfare benefits.

==== Closure of Berkeley Pit ====
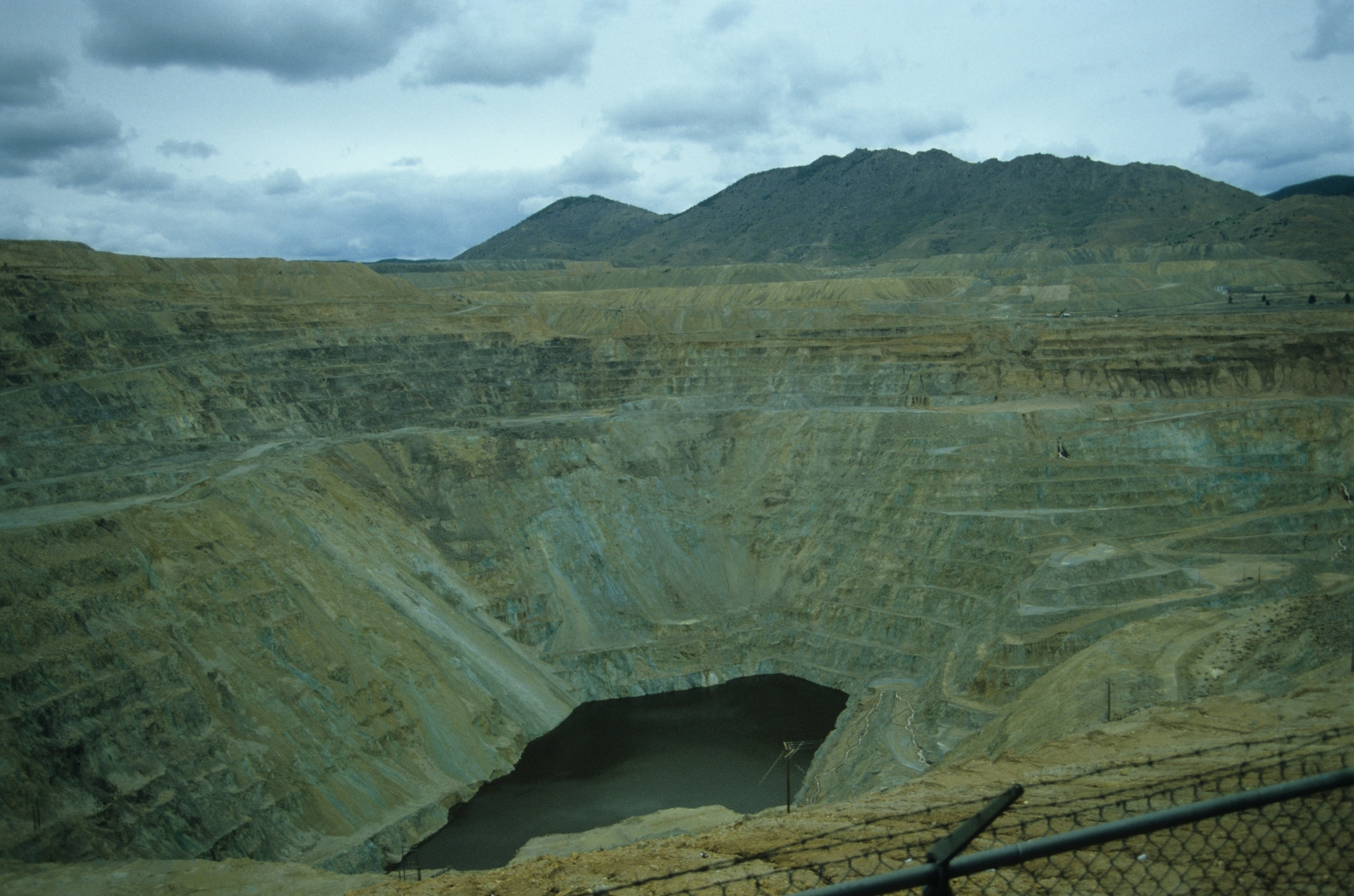
The Berkeley Pit in 1984.

Anaconda ceased mining at the Continental Pit in 1983. Montana Resources LLP bought the property and reopened the Continental Pit in 1986. The company stopped mining in 2000, but resumed in 2003 with higher metal prices, and continues at last report, employing 346 people. From 1880 through 2005, the mines of the Butte district have produced more than 9.6 million metric tons of copper, 2.1 million metric tons of zinc, 1.6 million metric tons of manganese, 381,000 metric tons of lead, 87,000 metric tons of molybdenum, 715 million troy ounces (22,200 metric tons) of silver, and 2.9 million ounces (90 metric tons) of gold. After the closure of the Berkeley Pit mining operations in 1982, pipes which pumped groundwater out of the pit were turned off, resulting in the pit slowly filling with groundwater, creating an artificial lake. Only two years later the pit was classified as a Superfund site and an environmental hazard site. The water in the pit is contaminated with various hard metals, such as arsenic, cadmium, and zinc.

It was not until the 1990s that serious efforts to clean up the Berkeley Pit began. The situation gained even more attention after as many as 342 migrating geese chose the pit lake as a resting place, resulting in their deaths. Steps have since been taken to prevent a recurrence, including but not limited to loudspeakers broadcasting sounds to scare off waterfowl. However, in November 2003 the Horseshoe Bend treatment facility went online and began treating and diverting much of the water that would have flowed into the pit. The Berkeley Pit is both a Superfund site and tourist attraction, viewable from an observation deck. Per a 2014 report, scientists believe the Berkeley Pit may reach the critical water level—potentially contaminating Silver Bow Creek—by the year 2023. Beginning in 2019, the Montana Resources and Atlantic Richfield Co. are ordered by the Environmental Protection Agency to begin treating water from the pit, which is to then be discharged into Silver Bow Creek at a rate of 7,000,000 US gallons (26,000,000 L) per day. Nikia Greene, EPA project manager for mine flooding, assured in 2014: "The pit is a giant bathtub. There’s a hydraulic gradient into the pit. We will never let the water reach the critical level."

=== 2000–present: Preservation efforts ===
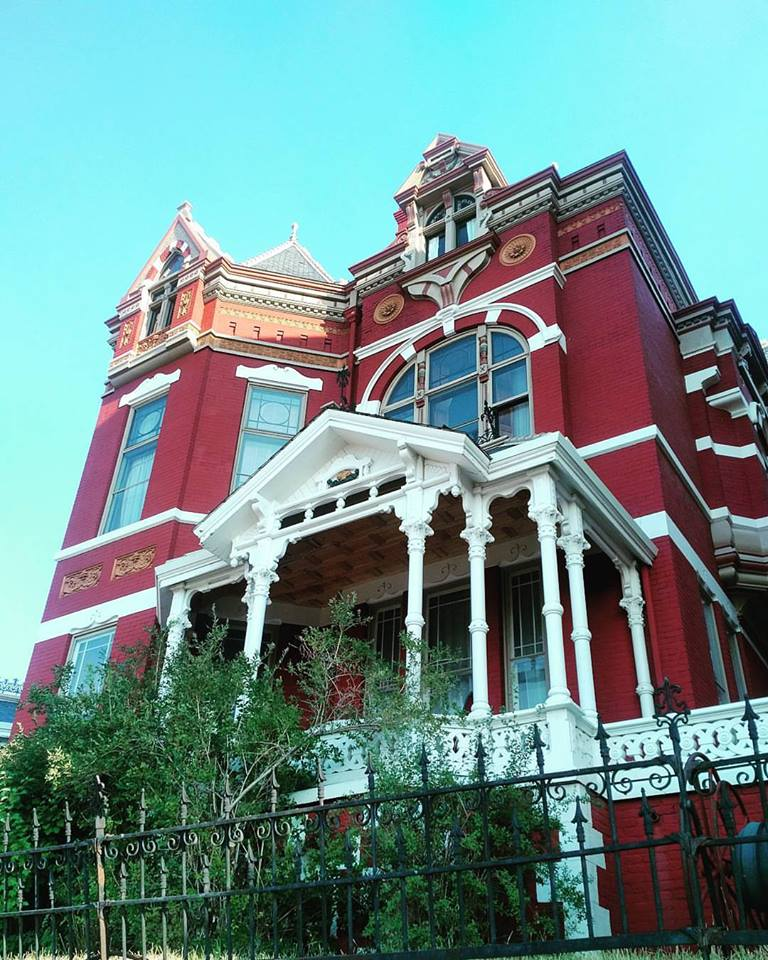
The Copper King Mansion, built in 1884, underwent restoration in 2011.

Contemporarily, around twenty of the headframes still stand over the mine shafts, and the city still contains thousands of historic commercial and residential buildings from the boom times, which, especially in the Uptown section, give it a very old-fashioned appearance, with many commercial buildings not fully occupied. Restoration and preservation of the city's historically-significant buildings has also been undertaken, with the Copper King Mansion as an example, having undergone significant restoration in 2011. As with many industrial cities, tourism and services, especially healthcare (Butte's St. James Hospital has Southwest Montana's only major trauma center), as well as energy companies (such as the Renewable Energy Corporation and NorthWestern Energy), are economic presences. In 2014, NorthWestern Energy constructed a $25-million facility in uptown Butte. are rising as primary employers, as well as industrial-sector private companies. Many areas of the city, especially the areas near the old mines, show signs of urban blight but a recent influx of investors and an aggressive campaign to remedy blight has led to a renewed interest in restoring property in Uptown Butte's historic district, which was expanded in 2006 to include parts of Anaconda and is now the largest National Historic Landmark District in the United States with nearly 6,000 contributing properties.

A century after the era of intensive mining and smelting, the area around the city remains an environmental issue. Arsenic and heavy metals such as lead are found in high concentrations in some spots affected by old mining, and for a period of time in the 1990s the tap water was unsafe to drink due to poor filtration and decades-old wooden supply pipes. Environmental research and clean-up efforts have contributed to the diversification of the local economy in the post-millennium era, and signs of vitality remain, including a multimillion-dollar polysilicon manufacturing plant locating nearby in the 1990s and the city's recognition and designation in the late 1990s as an All-America City and also as one of the National Trust for Historic Preservation's Dozen Distinctive Destinations in 2002.

== See also ==
- Anaconda Copper
- History of Montana

== Works cited ==
- Calvert, Jerry (1988). The Gibraltar: Socialism and Labor in Butte, Montana. Montana Historical Society. ISBN 978-0-917-29814-1.
- Davies, John Francis (1895). The Great Dynamite Explosions at Butte, Montana: January 15, 1895. B.L. Wilson.
- Emmons, David (1989). The Butte Irish: Class and Ethnicity in an American Mining Town, 1875–1925. University of Illinois Press. ISBN 978-0-252-06155-4.
- Everett, George (2007). Butte Trivia. Riverbend Publishing Co. ISBN 978-1-931-83285-4.
- Finn, Janet L. (2012). Mining Childhood: Growing Up in Butte, 1900-1960. Montana Historical Society Press. ISBN 978-0-980-12925-0.
- Finn, Janet L. (1998). Tracing the Veins: Of Copper, Culture, and Community from Butte to Chuquicamata. University of California Press. ISBN 978-0-520-92007-1.
- Gammons, Christopher H.; Metesh, John J.; Duaime, Terence E. (2006). "An overview of the mining history and geology of Butte, Montana". Mine Water and the Environment. 25 (2): 70–5. doi:10.1007/s10230-006-0113-7. S2CID 140546065.
- Glasscock, C. B. (1935). The War of the Copper Kings: The Builders of Butte and the Wolves of Wall Street. Grosset and Dunlap.
- MacGibbon, Elma (1904). Leaves of Knowledge. Shaw & Borden Co.
- MacMillan, Donald (2000). Smoke Wars: Anaconda Copper, Montana Air Pollution, and the Courts, 1890–1924. Montana Historical Society Press. ISBN 978-0-917-29865-3.
- Malone, Michael P. (2006) [1981]. The Battle for Butte: Mining and Politics on the Northern Frontier, 1864–1906. University of Washington Press. ISBN 978-0-295-80219-0.
- Malone, Michael (1985). "The Close of the Copper Century". Montana: The Magazine of Western History. 35: 69–72.
- McCarthy, Bob J. (1988). "Re-Claiming Butte: The Doctrine of Subjacent Support". Montana Law Review. 267 (49).
- Murphy, Mary (1997). Mining Cultures: Men, Women, and Leisure in Butte, 1914–41. University of Illinois Press. ISBN 978-0-252-06569-9.
- Nash, June (1993) [1979]. We Eat the Mines and the Mines Eat Us. Columbia University Press. ISBN 978-0-231-08051-4.
- Ring, Trudy; Watson, Noelle; Schellinger, Paul, eds. (2013) [1996]. The Americas: International Dictionary of Historic Places. Routledge. ISBN 978-1-134-25930-4.
- Shovers, B.; Fiege, M; Martin, F.; Quivik, F (1991). Butte and Anaconda Revisited: An Overview of Early-Day Mining and Smelting in Montana. Butte Historical Society; Klepetko Chapter, Society for Industrial Archeology.
- Wyckoff, William (1995). "Postindustrial Butte". The Geographical Review. 85 (4): 478–97. doi:10.2307/215921. JSTOR 215921.
