= Copper Kings =

Trio of American industrialists

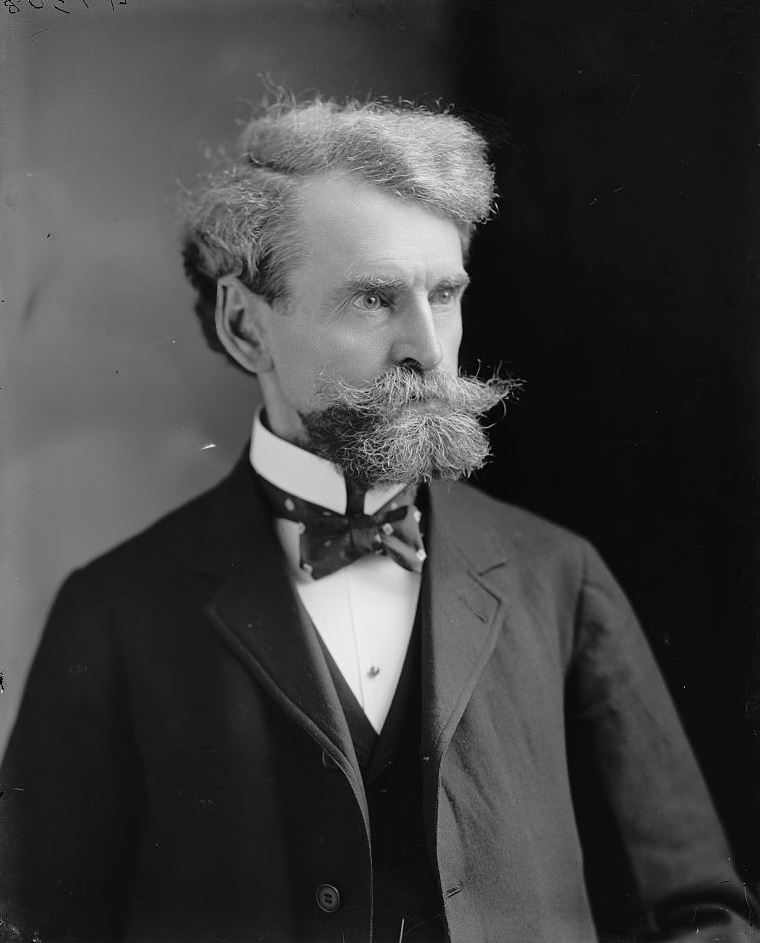
William A. Clark

The Copper Kings were industrialists Marcus Daly, William A. Clark, and F. Augustus Heinze. They were known for their struggles over control of the copper mining industry centered in Butte, Montana and the surrounding region, during the Gilded Age, particularly the period 1888-1900.

The battles between Clark, Daly, and Heinze, and later between Heinze and Daly's successors, the Amalgamated Copper Company are a large chapter in the first decade of the 1900s in Montana history. Eventually, Daly's original Anaconda Copper Company, renamed Amalgamated Copper, emerged as a monopoly, expanding into the fourth largest company in the world by the late 1920s.

== History ==
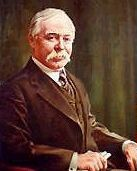
Marcus Daly

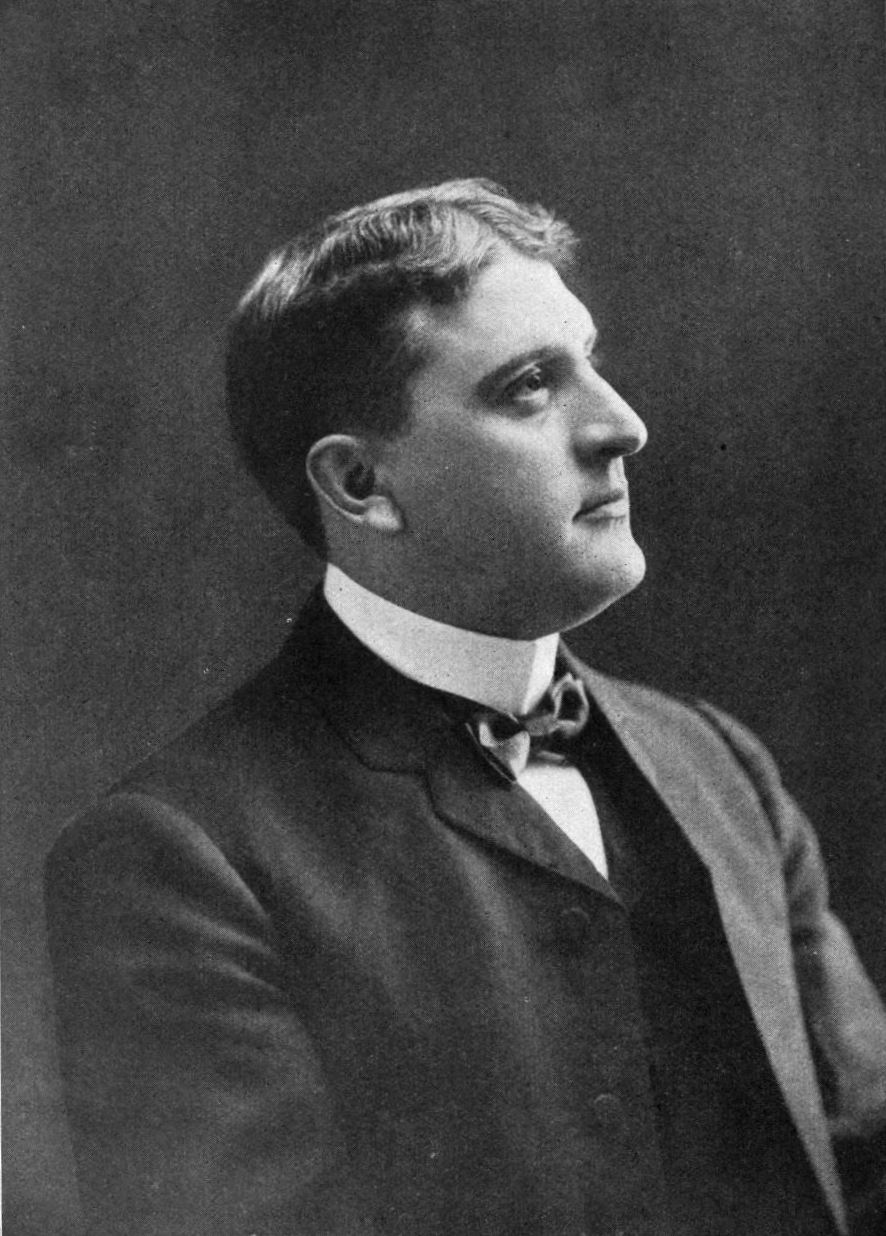
F. Augustus Heinze

While the cost of smelting the complex copper-bearing ore was high, after the American Civil War, investors like William Andrews Clark and Andrew Jackson Davis began to develop Butte's mines and erect mills to extract the silver and gold. The riches in the hills made Davis Montana's first millionaire.

By 1876, Butte had become a prosperous silver camp with over 1,000 inhabitants. Marcus Daly arrived that year representing the Walker brothers, entrepreneurs from Salt Lake City. His mission was to inspect Butte's silver mines for possible purchase. Daly purchased the Alice mine and successfully managed it for the Walkers. The town of Walkerville, which still overlooks the city of Butte, sprang up around the mine and other mines in the area.

By the early 1880s, copper mining came into the forefront and Butte eventually became the world's greatest copper producer. The Utah and Northern Railway came to the area in 1881.

In 1880, Daly sold his interest in the Walkers' properties and bought the Anaconda Mine. He did so with investment money from Hearst, Haggin, Tevis and Company of San Francisco, the partnership of James Ben Ali Haggin, Lloyd Tevis, and George Hearst (the father of media mogul William Randolph Hearst). The area attracted other investors from Denver and points east. It wasn't long before Adolph Lewisohn and his brother Leonard Lewisohn, capitalists from New York City and Boston bought into the huge potential of the area, creating the Boston and Montana Company. Other major figures included James Andrew Murray and Miles Finlen.

It wasn't long before Butte began to pay a price for the riches. The air filled with toxic sulfurous smoke. Daly responded by building a giant smelter in Anaconda, about 30 miles west of Butte. To this day, the giant smokestack remains a landmark. Shortly after Daly built the smelter, the Boston and Montana Company, with holdings second only to Daly's, built one in Great Falls. After complications with the Montana Union railroad, controlled jointly by the Union Pacific (via its subsidiary, the Utah and Northern Railway) and the Northern Pacific Railway, Daly built his own railroad, the Butte, Anaconda and Pacific Railway to transport ore from his mines to the smelter. Daly and other mine owners collaborated with the Great Northern Railway to break the rate pool monopoly of the Northern Pacific/Utah and Northern alliance

Clark also yearned to be a statesman and used his newspaper, the Butte Miner, to push his political ambitions. He became a hero in Helena, Montana, by campaigning for its election as the state capital instead of Anaconda. Clark's long-standing dream of becoming a United States senator resulted in scandal in 1899, when it was revealed that he bribed members of the Montana State Legislature in return for their votes. At the time, U.S. Senators were chosen by their respective state legislators. The U.S. Senate refused to seat Clark because of the 1899 bribery scheme, but a later Senate campaign was successful, and he served a single, undistinguished term from 1901 until 1907.

In 1899, Daly teamed up with two principals of Standard Oil, Henry Rogers and William A. Rockefeller, via his son William G. Rockefeller to create the giant Amalgamated Copper Mining Co., which became one of the largest trusts of the early Twentieth Century. (Neither Standard Oil nor John D. Rockefeller were directly involved).

Marcus Daly died in 1900. John D. Ryan, a local banker, became close to Margaret Daly after her husband's death,

By 1915, Amalgamated Copper had changed its name back to the Anaconda Copper Mining Company, having swallowed several smaller mining companies along the way. The Company dominated Butte for the next 75 years.
