= Marcus Daly =

American businessman (1841–1900)

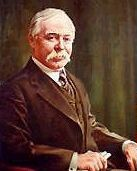
- Born: December 5, 1841; Ballyjamesduff, County Cavan, Ulster, Ireland
- Died: November 12, 1900 (aged 58); New York City, US
- Resting place: Green-Wood Cemetery; Brooklyn, New York
- Known for: Copper industrialist in Montana
- Spouse(s): Margaret Price Evans Daly (1853–1941)
- Children: 1 son, 3 daughters

Marcus Daly (December 5, 1841 – November 12, 1900) was an Irish-born American businessman known as one of the Copper Kings of Butte, Montana, United States. In 1943, SS Marcus Daly was launched in honor of his achievements.

== Early life ==
Daly emigrated from County Cavan, Ireland, to the United States as a young boy, arriving in New York City. He sold newspapers and worked his way to California in time to join the gold rush on what was to become Virginia City, Nevada, and the extremely rich silver diggings now known as the Comstock Lode, in 1860.

== Career ==
Daly gained experience in the mines of the Comstock under the direction of John William Mackay and James G. Fair. While working in the mines of Virginia City, Daly met and befriended George Hearst and partners James Ben Ali Haggin and Lloyd Tevis, co-owners of the Ophir Mining Company. (Hearst's son was William Randolph Hearst). In 1872, Daly would recommend purchase by the Hearst group the Ontario mine, near Park City, Utah. In ten years, the Ontario produced $17 million and paid $6,250,000 in dividends, and made many millions for Hearst, Tevis and Haggin.

Their business friendship was to extend for many years and help establish the Anaconda Copper Mine in Butte, Montana. Daly originally came to Butte in August 1876 to look at a mine, the Alice, as an agent for the Walker brothers of Salt Lake City. The Walkers purchased the mine, installed Daly as superintendent and awarded him a fractional share of the mine. The Walkers became the namesakes of Walkerville, which formed around the Alice.

Always an energetic engineer and geologist with a keen eye for paying ore, Daly noticed while working underground in the Alice, that there were significant deposits of copper ore. He gained access into several other mines in the area and concluded that the hill was full of copper ore. He envisioned an ore body several thousand feet deep, some veins of almost pure copper that would be worth hundreds of millions of dollars. He urged his employers, the Walker Bros. to purchase the Anaconda and when they refrained, Daly bought it. Daly founded his fortune on the Anaconda Copper Mine in Butte, after selling his small share of the Alice Mine, for $30,000.

In 1886, Daly bought property in Hamilton, Montana, building a summer residence and creating the Bitterroot Stock Farm, a 22,000 acre ranch and horse breeding facility. The ranch included a stable called Tammany Castle, built for his prize-winning thoroughbred Tammany, a racetrack, and veterinary clinic, amongst other operations like apple orchards and cattle. These were built around the family's residence, the Daly Mansion. In order to bring water to the agricultural fields, Daly invested in several ditch companies to build irrigation canals throughout the valley. Shortly thereafter he became involved in the timber industry in the Bitterroot Valley, purchasing acres of timberland and building sawmills to provide fuel for the smelters in Anaconda. Daly continued to invest in the area, developing infrastructure for the growing workforce. Daly opened the Bitterroot Development Company Store in 1890, which became the Valley Mercantile 18 years later.

== The Anaconda ==
The Anaconda began as a silver mine, but Daly's purchase was for the copper, found to be one of the largest deposits known at the time. However, he lacked the money to develop it, so he turned to Hearst, Haggin and Tevis. Backed with many millions of dollars, he set out upon developing The Richest Hill on Earth. The first couple hundred feet within the mine were rich in silver, and took a few years to exhaust. By that time, Butte's other silver mines were also playing out, so Daly closed the Anaconda, St Lawrence and Neversweat mines. Prices on surrounding properties dropped and Daly quietly purchased them. Then he re-opened the Anaconda as a copper mine and announced to the world that Butte was "The Richest Hill on Earth". Shortly before this time, Thomas Edison had developed the light bulb and built a city block in New York to show off what electricity could do. The world would need copper as it was an excellent conductor of electricity. Butte had copper. In 1882, nine million tons of copper were mined from a five-square-mile region. Just 14 years later the area was producing 210 million pounds of copper.

He built a smelter to handle the ore, and by the late 1880s, had become a millionaire several times over, and owner of the Anaconda Mining and Reduction Company. Daly owned a railroad, the Butte, Anaconda and Pacific Railroad to haul ore from his mines to his smelter in Anaconda, a city he founded for his employees to work the smelters. Anaconda's smelters quickly became the world's largest metallurgical plant. Daly's lumber and investment interests in the Bitterroot Valley spurred the creation of a rail line by the Northern Pacific Railway in Hamilton. This railway transported massive amounts of lumber to Anaconda for the smelters.

In 1894, Daly spearheaded an energetic but unsuccessful campaign to have Anaconda designated as Montana's state capital, but lost out to Helena, which was supported by William Andrews Clark. Daly was active in Montana politics throughout the 1890s, because of his opposition and intense rivalry with fellow copper king, and future U.S. Senator, William Clark. Daly tried to keep Clark out of office by lavishly supporting Clark's opponents.

In 1898, Daly went looking for a buyer of his company. He entered into negotiations with William Rockefeller and Henry H. Rogers of John D Rockefeller's Standard Oil of Ohio. The Anaconda Mining Company (and associated interests) were purchased in 1899 for $39 million and became Amalgamated Copper Mining Company. Daly was made president of the company in 1899 and died the following year in 1900.

== Thoroughbred horse racing ==
Daly invested some of his money in horse breeding at his Bitterroot Stock Farm located near Hamilton. A number of his horses were successful, which some speculators attributed to the elevation and climate of Hamilton, and others to the rich feed produced by the valley.

In 1890, Daly became the owner of Tammany, identified as Horse of the Year in 1892. He owned and stood Inverness, sire of Scottish Chieftain, as well as Hamburg, Ogden, and The Pepper. Scottish Chieftain is the only horse born in Montana that has won the Belmont Stakes. He also arranged the breeding of the great Sysonby, ranked number 30 in the top 100 U.S. thoroughbred champions of the 20th Century by Blood-Horse magazine, though Daly died before the horse was born. In 1956, Sysonby was made a member of the Racing Horse Hall of Fame.

Following his death, New York's Madison Square Garden hosted a dispersal sale for the Bitterroot thoroughbred stud, beginning on January 31, 1901; 185 horses were sold the first day for $405,525.

== Legacy ==
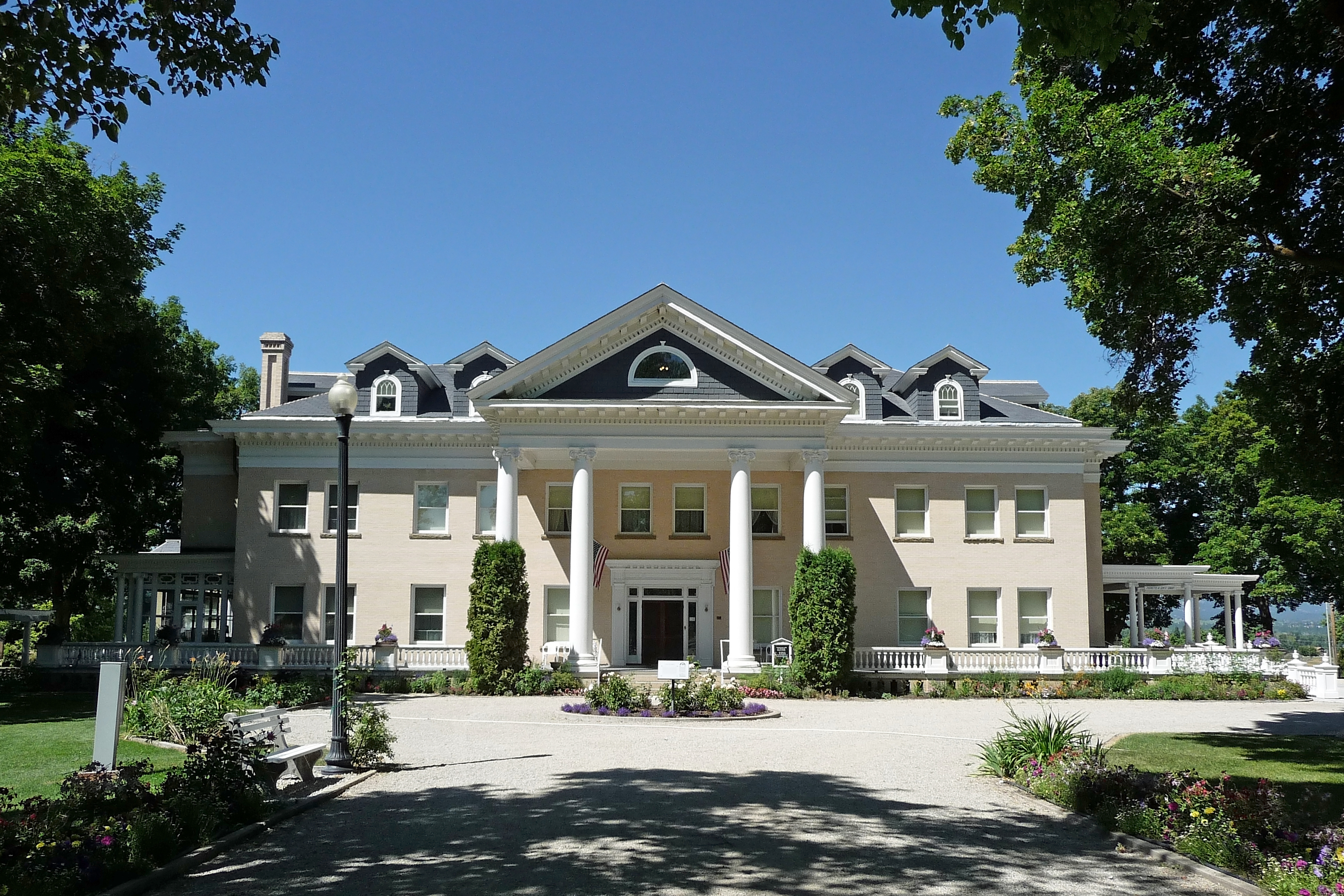
Margaret Daly's house, Riverside, near Hamilton

Daly's legacy was a mixed one for Anaconda. From 1885 to 1980, the smelter was one of the town's largest employers and provided well-paid jobs for generations. When the smelter closed in 1980, during a labor strike, 25% of the town's workforce was put out of work and the town has not recovered. The smelter itself was torn down as part of environmental cleanup efforts in the 1990s, although the smokestack is still in place, visible for many miles across the valley, above the town.

Daly's legacy was equally mixed for Butte. The Anaconda Company was bought out by the Amalgamated Copper Mining Company in 1899, and by the 1920s it controlled mining in the city. It continued to be one of the state's largest employers and a mainstay of the state and local economies until the 1970s. In the 1950s, the ACM began open-pit mining in Butte, creating a steadily growing pit, known as the Berkeley Pit, east of the main business district. In the mid-1970s, copper prices collapsed and the ACM was bought out by the Atlantic Richfield Company, (ARCO). ARCO ceased mining in Butte in 1980 and shut off the deep pumps in 1982, ending what Daly had begun almost exactly 100 years before. Montana Resources, owned by the Washington Group, as of 2007, operates an open pit copper and molybdenum mine in Butte, and also recovers copper from the water in the Berkeley Pit. In 1980 the Berkeley Pit, the Clark Fork River and the smelter outside the town of Anaconda, MT were declared federal Superfund sites by the US EPA.

A statue of Daly by Augustus Saint-Gaudens stands at the main entrance to Montana Tech of the University of Montana (formerly the Montana School of Mines), at the west end of Park Street in Butte.

A drawing of Daly by the Swiss-born American artist Adolfo Müller-Ury (1862–1947) was acquired in 2009 by the American National Portrait Gallery in Washington D.C.

Riverside, the summer home of the Daly Family, is located in Hamilton, Montana and open to visitors. Margaret Daly, Marcus' wife, had the home remodeled after his death into a Georgian-Revival Style Colonial.

The Marcus Daly Memorial Hospital, located in Hamilton, Montana, now called Bitterroot Health-Daly Hospital, was incorporated on December 18, 1929.

Hamilton also hosts the Daly Days celebration to honor Marcus Daly.

During WWII, the US Navy honored Marcus Daly with a liberty ship in honor of his accomplishments, the SS Marcus Daly. The ship served honorably during the war, from 1943 to the end of hostilities, earning several service medals in the process.

== See also ==
- Anaconda Copper
- Copper Kings
- George Hearst
- Hennessy's
- William A. Clark
