= Speculator Mine disaster =

1917 event in Butte, Montana, United States

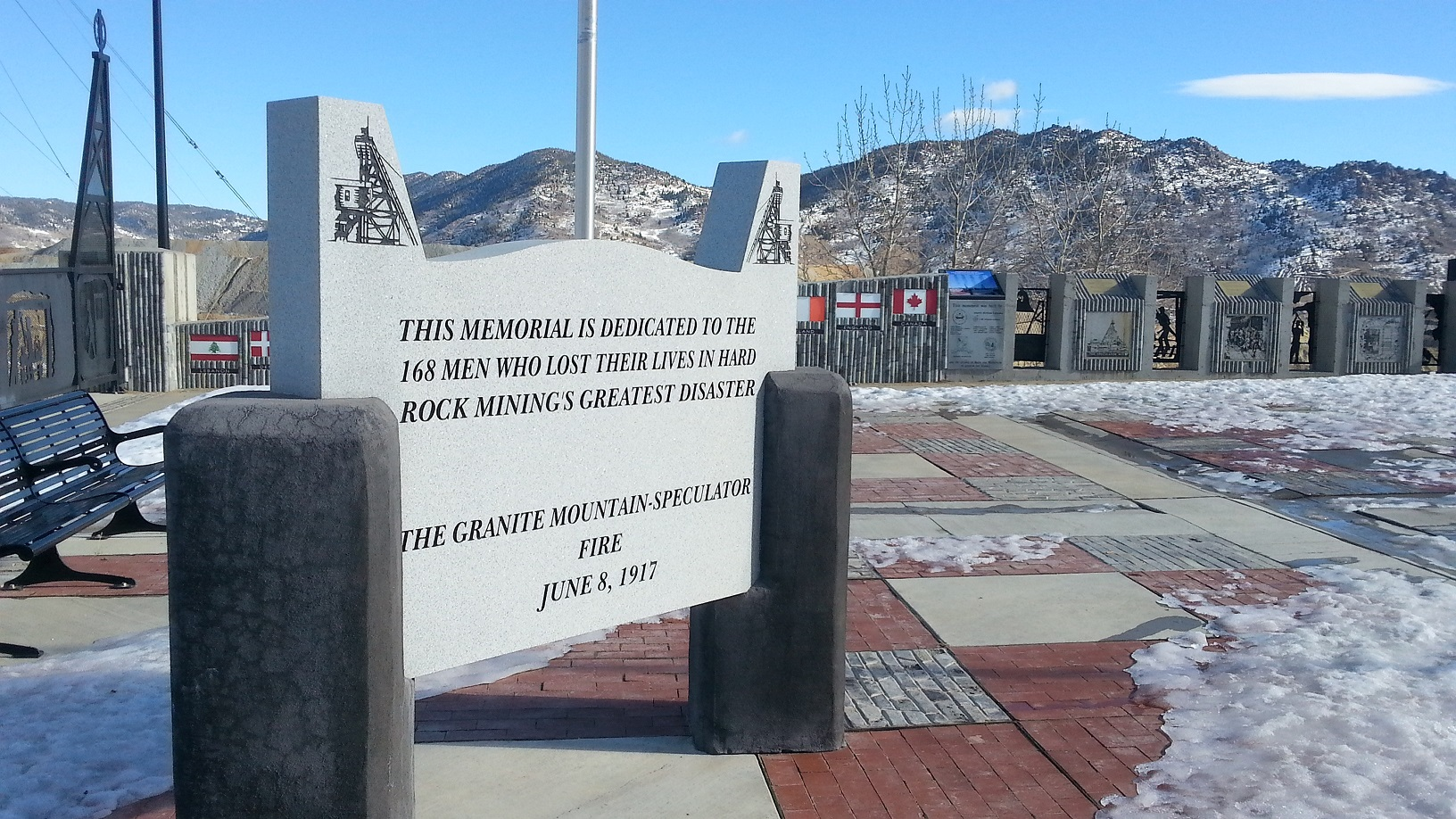
Monument to the victims

The Granite Mountain/Speculator Mine disaster of June 8, 1917, occurred as a result of a fire in a copper mine, and was the most deadly event in underground hard rock mining in United States history. Most men died of suffocation underground as the fire consumed their oxygen; a total of 168 miners were killed. The Butte, Montana copper mines were at full wartime production to support the US in World War I. Miners had been seeking improved working conditions, as they were at high risk.

As part of a fire safety sprinkler system, the mining company was installing an electric cable into the Granite Mountain mine. The cable fell in an area approximately 2,500 ft (800 m) below the surface and was damaged. When a foreman with a carbide lamp tried to inspect the damage, he accidentally ignited the oil-soaked cloth insulation on the cable. The fire quickly climbed the cable, and turned the shaft into a chimney, igniting the timbers in the shaft and consuming oxygen in the mines.

A total of 168 miners died in the ensuing blaze, most from asphyxia. Some of the deceased did not die immediately; they survived for a day or two in the tunnels. Some left notes written while they waited in hopes of rescue. A few managed to barricade themselves behind bulkheads in the mine and were found after as long as 55 hours. The miners went out on strike to protest working conditions and the many deaths after the disaster.

A memorial honoring the miners killed in the fire was later erected at the site. Some of the notes written by the miners while they waited to be rescued can be viewed at the site. The monument is located at 46°1′35.90″N 112°31′25.12″W.

== Disaster ==
The 5 inch thick, 1200 foot cable was being lowered down the Granite Mountain shaft to install a sprinkler system on June 8, tied to the shaft's cage's hoisting rope. The lower 200 ft of cable became coiled about the hoisting rope, so workers cut some ties to straighten it out, but at 8 PM the cable slipped and fell. It snagged and became a tangled mess below the 2,400 ft level, and the protective lead lining was ripped off in many places, exposing the oil-cloth insulation.

At 11:30 PM, assistant foreman Ernest Sullau and 3 others traveled in the cage to hoist the cable out. While climbing out of the cage to inspect the cable at 11:45, his carbide lantern lit the insulation, and the men could not stamp the fire out. The men hurried back up to the 2400 level. Sullau got off there to throw water down the shaft with a bucket and warn as many people as he could to evacuate, and the others continued to the surface to fit a bigger cage to carry men up while using the shaft remained possible. Of the 3 men, John Collins went to check the mineshaft's electric signal system still worked. The others, Mike Conroy and Peter Sheridan, did not wait and rode down to the 2,200 ft level. Another man joined them, but saw flames already approaching the 2200 level, and refused to ride it back up. He later escaped through mine tunnels and survived. It is likely Sheridan and Conroy signaled to be pulled back up, but the signal lines were destroyed by fire. The uneasy operator waited a signal, and pulled the cage up anyway when he saw smoke coming from the shaft.

The fire was hot enough to reverse the mineshaft's normal, downward, flow. It went up, burning the chemically treated support timbers, and by the time the cage came up, flames were "flying from the shaft like a gigantic torch". The cage dangled from the head-frame atop flames for some time, the flames were too hot for fire-fighters to retrieve Conroy's and Sheridan's bodies.

By 12:10 AM, June 9, smoke began to rise from the Speculator shaft too, and by 1:00 AM, had penetrated from Speculator to the nearby Diamond mineshaft.

The Granite Mountain site was connected to the sister-shaft Speculator, 800 feet apart, by at least 10 crosscuts, together they had underground connections to five surrounding Anaconda minesites. 415 men were working, mostly as isolated pairs or clusters, in Granite Mountain and Speculator. 150 of the 163 dead showed signs of carbon monoxide poisoning. Most survivors escaped in the initial hours after the fire by using those tunnels to escape via the shafts of the Speculator or the nearby Anaconda-owned mines.

There was much confusion in the evacuation. At first, workers often mistook the fumes for smoke from ordinary drilling and blasting; when they did start to evacuate, many headed towards the burning Granite Mountain shaft, unaware it was the fire's source. Many were also freshly hired Eastern-European immigrants who could not read English and didn't know the mine's layout, which lacked signage for exit paths, although one source says there were such signs, not noticed due to confusion, fear and haste. There was no alarm system, hence Sullau heading deeper into the mine to warn people himself instead of evacuating. He later fell unconscious from fumes after going via tunnel to the High Ore mine, and died in hospital some hours after.

By morning, June 10th, hopes of recovering survivors instead of bodies had faded, with the Anaconda Standard saying all the missing miners were "probably dead". Electricity had been restored to the Speculator shaft, its wiring surviving.

On the afternoon of the 10th, the signal bell for the Speculator's 2400 level sounded, and two rescuers in gas masks were sent down to investigate, finding a group of mostly naked survivors waiting. The group had been trapped between spreading fumes and doorless bulkheads the night before, and sealed themselves inside a dead-end drift (a tunnel) by improvising a bulkhead using canvas ventilation ducts, spare materials, and their own clothes. Forced out by depleting air, the miners crawled to the shaft. The air in the mine was by now somewhat clearer. Some of the miners had wanted to break the bulkhead and escape hours earlier when their supply of oxygen was so depleted that their lamps could not be lit and they were gasping for breath, but it is likely that this would have caused their deaths. The miner who lead the group to build the bulkhead, Manus Duggan, insisted on holding out. He would open a small hole in the bulkhead and sniff the outside air to check the air. He led the group to the safety of the shaft, but disappeared while the cage was running men to safety, possibly due to carbon-monoxide induced delirium. Another miner tried to run away, but was restrained. Duggan's body was later found on a ladder, having climbed nearly 30 stories, apparently trying to reach the nearby Rainbow mineshaft. Of the 29 men who sheltered behind Duggan's bulkhead, 25 were rescued and survived, 9 needing medical treatment.

Two other groups of miners sealed themselves with improvised bulkheads. On the 2600 level was a bulkhead for 19 men, all found dead. Their drift had a manway to the 2800 level which was not plugged, and it was built on loose, blasted backfill rock, so toxic fumes leaked in and killed them.

Another group, led by shift boss J.D. Moore, of 8 or 10 men (sources disagree) bulkheaded themselves in on the 2200 level. Their bulkhead was found on June 10th by a rescue-man who knocked, but received no response. After Duggan's group were found, the rescue-man reported this, and rescuers went to double check it on the 11th, rescuing six men, who were by then unable to crawl.

== Metal Mine Workers Union ==
The Metal Mine Workers Union developed from the labor unrest in Butte, Montana in 1917. The copper mines of Butte produced a strong union presence in the city; by 1887, all of the city's mines were unionized. This "closed shop" persisted until 1914 when internal struggles destroyed the once powerful Butte Miners Union of the Western Federation of Miners and opened the mines to corporate control.

Several days after the Speculator disaster, miners began to walk off the job at copper mines all over the city in protest of the poor working conditions. A meeting was organized and the Metal Mine Workers union, an unaffiliated and independent union, formed less than two weeks after the Speculator Mine fire. The new union immediately petitioned the Anaconda Copper Company and its subsidiaries for recognition of their union, demanding safer working conditions and wage increases. By the end of June, other trade unions, including the Electricians, Boilermakers, Blacksmiths, and Metal Trades Machinists of Butte, joined the miners in their strike.

The companies resisted the mining union organizers' efforts and chose to work with the other trade unions, acquiescing to many of their demands in hopes of isolating the miners' union and forcing an end to the strike. Around this time, Frank Little, an American labor leader and member of the Industrial Workers of the World, arrived in Butte to support the miners. By the end of July, most of the other trade unions had reached a deal and returned to work. Little, for his support of the miners, was tortured and then lynched by six masked men on August 1, 1917. The miners' union continued to strike through 1917, however, many miners returned to work before its official end. The Metal Mine Workers union officially called off the strike on December 18, 1917.

== In popular culture ==
The disaster has inspired and been memorialized in songs: "The Miners" by independent Celtic recording artists The Elders on their album Story Road (2014), "Rox in the Box" on the album The King is Dead (2011) by the indie rock band The Decemberists, and “In the Darkness” by a Montana Folk band named Tophouse. The members of the band are from Butte, Montana, though it was their other member from Kalispell, Montana who wrote the song.

== Bibliography ==
- Punke, Michael (2016). Fire and brimstone: the North Butte mining disaster of 1917 (Paperback ed.). London: The Borough Press. ISBN 978-0-00-818931-0.
