= Anaconda Road massacre =

1920 labor incident in Butte, Montana, US

Coordinates: 46°01′03″N 112°31′47″W

On April 21, 1920, during a miners strike in Butte, Montana's copper mines, company guards fired on striking miners picketing near a mine of the Anaconda Copper Mining Company, killing Tom Manning and injuring sixteen others, an event known as the Anaconda Road massacre. His death went unpunished.

== Strike and massacre ==
On April 19, 1920, the Industrial Workers of the World (IWW) and the Metal Mine Workers Industrial Union called for a strike in the mines around Butte. They hoped the strike would help secure higher wages, an eight-hour day, and end the use of the rustling card, a system that allowed employers to blacklist employees involved in union organizing, among other goals. The strike came at a weak point for the union movement in Butte. World War I had undermined the power of the Butte Miners Union and the mines around the town were open shops. Only six years earlier, in 1914, the Butte Miners Union Hall had been destroyed. Rising copper prices, fatal mining accidents, and recruitment by the IWW had further exacerbated tensions in the town. Three years before the strike, an IWW organizer named Frank Little was beaten and hanged from a railroad trestle by unknown assailants. Thus, the strike began in an atmosphere of tension.

The day the strike was called, picketers began blocking roads to mines in the area, including the Anaconda Road. These picketers turned non-striking miners away from the mines. By the second day of the strike, the picketers had succeeded in shutting down nearly all mining in Butte. The same day, a local newspaper called the Butte Daily Bulletin reported that the head of the Anaconda Copper Mining Company had suggested killings and hangings to help end the strike. On the 21st, the local sheriff deputized the Anaconda mine guards in an attempt to contain the strike.

That afternoon, a few hundred picketers gathered outside the Anaconda company's Neversweat Mine. The sheriff arrived and apparently attempted to mediate the dispute. However, the Anaconda mine guards opened fire on the picketers, although the reason why the shooting began is unclear. Sixteen miners were hit, and one, Tom Manning, was killed. All were shot in the back as they tried to flee.

Federal troops arrived on the 22nd, ostensibly to prevent further violence. A labor newspaper that wrote about the strike was suppressed. Three weeks later, the strike collapsed completely and the miners returned to work. No one was found guilty as a result of the massacre, despite an inquest into the death of Tom Manning. During the inquest, Anaconda employees testified that a shot had been fired at them from a boarding house across the street, something which residents of the boarding house disputed. Cross-examination of witnesses by union attorneys suggested that the Anaconda employees had received coaching to make their stories align. Anaconda attorneys attempted to undermine their accusers by pointing out that some of the miners had recently immigrated to the United States. In the end, the jury declared that Manning had been killed by a bullet but that the bullet had been fired by unknown persons, and his death is still officially unsolved.

The strike and massacre were the last major labor conflict in the area until the 1934 passage of the National Recovery Act allowed outside support to help rebuild the weakened Butte Miners Union.

== Fictional accounts ==
Dashiell Hammett, once a Pinkerton agent stationed in Butte, Montana—where he (allegedly) turned down an offer to assassinate Little—used some historical background on union troubles and corporate corruption in his novel Red Harvest. The Op summarizes the local history as, "The strike lasted eight months. Both sides bled plenty. The wobblies [Industrial Workers of the World] had to do their own bleeding. Old Elihu [the mine owner] hired gunmen, strike-breakers, national guardsmen and even parts of the regular army, to do his. When the last skull had been cracked, the last rib kicked in, organized labor in Personville was a used firecracker." Elihu justifies the violence with, "Son, if I hadn't been a pirate I'd still be working for the Anaconda for wages, and there'd be no Personville Mining Corporation."

== See also ==
- Murder of workers in labor disputes in the United States
