= Ontario silver mine =

Mine near Park City, Utah

Coordinates: 40.6238°N 111.4973°W

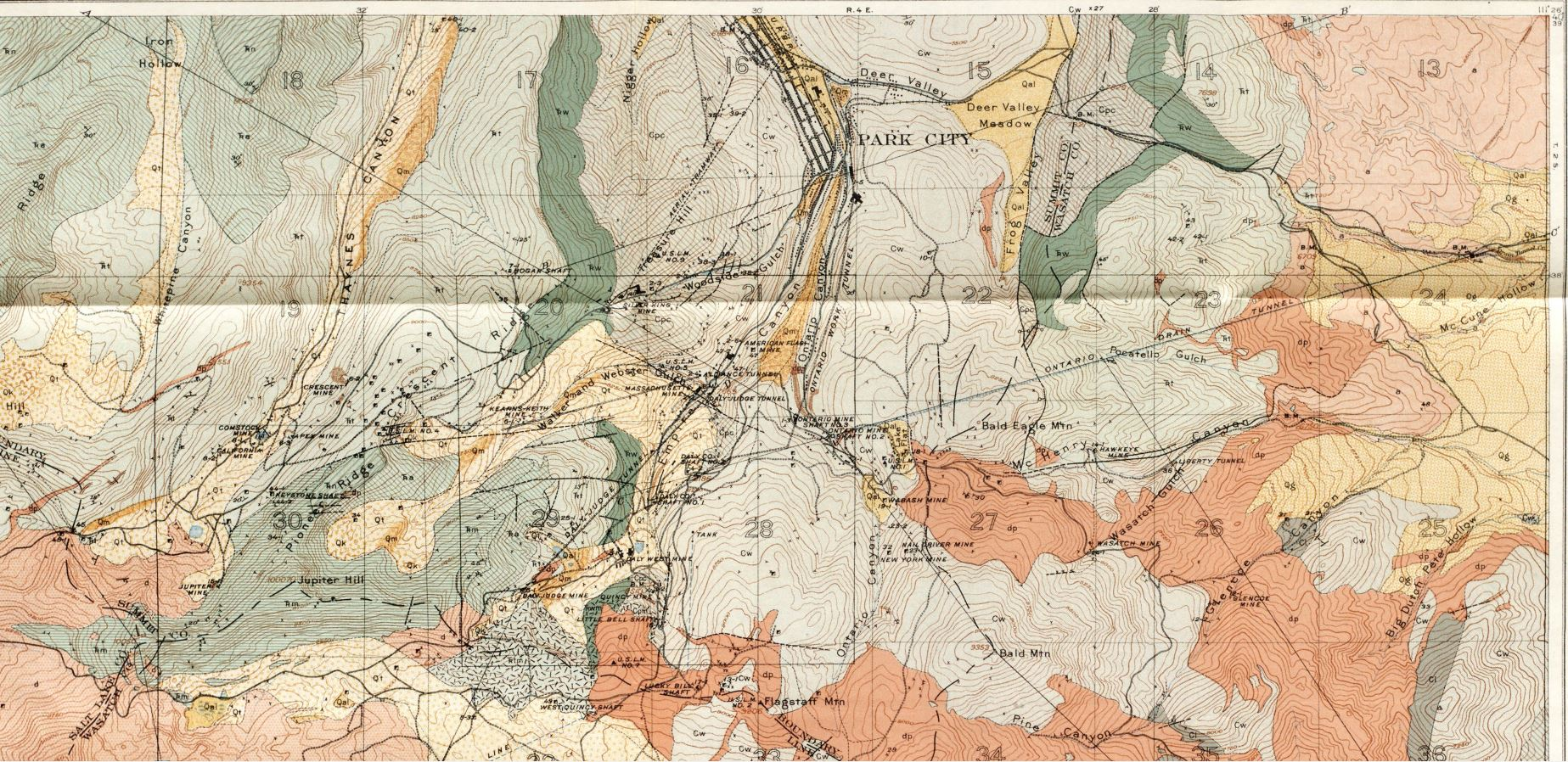
Ontario Silver Mine geological map

The Ontario silver mine is a mine that was active starting in 1872, and is located near Park City, Utah, United States.

== History ==
The lode was discovered by accident on 19 January 1872 by Herman Budden, Rector Steen (Pike), John Kain, and Gus McDowell. The mine was purchased by George Hearst through R. C. Chambers from the prospectors for $27,000 on 24 August 1872.

Hearst and his business partners James Ben Ali Haggin and Lloyd Tevis owned this mine and constructed the necessary infrastructure to make it productive, including hoists and stamp mill. The mine was not profitable for its first three years. According to legend, expenses of development substantially drained Hearst's financial resources. As a result of his straitened circumstances, Hearst sold his home and horses, and even dismissed his servants and enrolled his son William Randolph Hearst in public school. Chambers, who had been retained as manager, brought the bonanza ore body into production by the late 1870s. It eventually produced fifty million dollars' worth of silver and lead.

By the time of Hearst's death in 1891, the Ontario mine had paid him more than $12 million in dividends. This was only one of the four big mines he had bought shares in and that were located in the West, including the Ophir on the Comstock Lode, the Homestake Mine (South Dakota), and the Anaconda Copper Mine (Montana). The mine also made manager Chambers one of Utah's Bonanza Kings.

The Ontario mine was credited as being more consistent in yielding annual dividends during the late nineteenth century than any other mine in Utah. The Ontario company's mill was also the birthplace of two significant hydrometallurgical processes, the Russell Process and the Cyanide Process. Edward H Russell (Yale 1878) developed his process for working low grade silver ores by a leaching process, 1883–1884, and young Louis Janin (UC Berkeley) experimented with cyanide on the ores, filing a caveat to patent a cyanide process in 1886.

Between 1874 and 1964, the Ontario Mine produced 41,289 ounces of gold, 55,710,608 ounces of silver, 164,231,209 pounds of lead, 210,350,684 pounds of zinc, and 3,911,102 pounds of copper. Primary ores included argentiferous galena, sphalerite, and tetrahedrite-tennantite with pyrite and quartz gangue.

The Ontario mine reopened as a tourist attraction in 1995, only to close again after a few years.

== See also ==
- Ontario Hot Springs
