= Frank Little (unionist) =

American labor leader (1879–1917)

Frank H. Little
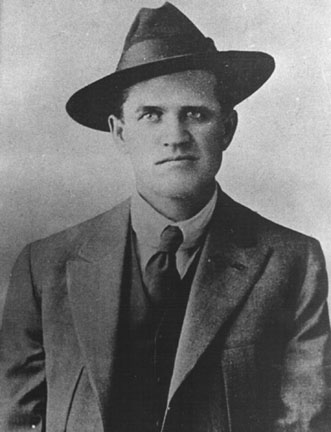
- Born: 1877 or 1878; Fulton County, Illinois, U.S.
- Died: August 1, 1917 (aged 39–40); Butte, Montana, U.S.
- Cause of death: Lynching
- Resting place: Mountain View Cemetery, Butte, Montana, United States
- Occupations: Miner; Labor leader
- Years active: 1903–1917
- Organization(s): WFM, IWW
- Height: 5 ft 11 in (180 cm)
- Movement: American Labor movement

Franklin Henry Little (1877 or 1878 – August 1, 1917), commonly known as Frank Little, was an American labor leader who was murdered in Butte, Montana. No one was apprehended or prosecuted for Little's murder. He joined the Industrial Workers of the World in 1905, organizing miners, lumberjacks, and oil field workers. He was a member of the union's Executive Board when he was murdered via lynching.

== Early life ==
According to the 1880 U.S. census, Franklin Henry Little was born in Illinois in 1877 or 1878 to Dr. Walter R. and Almira Hays Little. Dr. Walter Little attended medical school in Keokuk, Iowa between the years 1874 and 1878. In 1889 he left behind his medical practice in Missouri in the pursuit of a new home for his family, settling in Oklahoma, where the family became homesteaders in the 1889 Oklahoma Land Rush. The family suffered drought and penurious conditions after the Panic of 1893. After Dr. Walter Little died in 1899, Frank Little followed his miner brother, Walter Frederick Little, to California, where he too became a miner. In 1903, Frank left his brother and sister-in-law, Emma Harper Little, in California for Bisbee, Arizona. There he worked as a miner before becoming an organizer for the Western Federation of Miners in Clifton, Arizona. In 1905 Little joined the Industrial Workers of the World.

== Industrial Workers of the World ==
Frank Little was involved in organizing lumberjacks, metal miners, migrant farm workers, and oil field workers into industrial unions, often as part of free speech campaigns. He pioneered the passive resistance tactics used by the Freedom Riders during the Civil Rights Movement. Frank Little first took part in the 1909 Missoula, Montana free speech fight along with Elizabeth Gurley Flynn, helping organize lumber workers who suffered at the hands of logging company managers complicit with "sharks," or employment agencies who tricked workingmen out of their hard-earned money. Next Frank Little took part in the Spokane, Washington free speech fight, where he was sentenced to thirty days in prison for reading the Declaration of Independence. He suffered in Spokane's frigid Franklin School after refusing to work on the city rock pile.

Along with his organizer brother Walter Frederick Little and sister-in-law Emma Harper, Frank took part in free speech fights among workers in Fresno, California in 1910 and 1911. On one occasion, he was sentenced to 30 days imprisonment for reading the Declaration of Independence on a street corner. Little and several hundred workers were arrested for violating a city ordinance, congregating on city streets to publicly speak. In response, Frank said he expected a large arrival of Russians, Japanese, Germans, and Chinese to join the IWW. Many more workers belonging to the Industrial Workers of the World union came to the city and struck in support after Frank calls them to solidarity on May 10 and August 27, 1910. Frank and his brother would wait until after harvest to take the fight to the streets of Fresno. In response to the free speech fights sixty-six new IWW locals formed. Eventually, Little successfully organized unskilled fruit workers in the San Joaquin Valley of California, a precursor to Cesar Chavez's work. He also led free speech efforts in Kansas City, Missouri; Webb City, Missouri; and Peoria, Illinois.

In August 1913, Little and fellow Industrial Workers of the World union organizer James P. Cannon arrived in Duluth, Minnesota, to support the strike of ore-dock workers against the Great Northern Railway over dangerous working conditions. In the course of the strike he was kidnapped, held at gunpoint outside of the city, and dramatically rescued by union supporters.

In 1914, Little was elected a member of the Industrial Workers of the World's General Executive Board. Two years later he returned to the Great Lakes Region, where he organized Superior, Wisconsin, dock workers in a strike for better safety conditions and wages. There he was kidnapped, severely beaten, and mock hanged.

== Anti-war activism ==
Little was a strong opponent of capitalism after witnessing many late 19th and early 20th-century American businessmen use what he viewed as unscrupulous methods to get rich. As a result, he also opposed World War I, which many believed to be a "rich man's war and a poor man's fight." While General Secretary-Treasurer William Haywood and members of the General Executive Board shared Little's opinions about the war, they disagreed about whether to create anti-war agitation. When the United States joined the war in April 1917, Ralph Chaplin, the editor of the Industrial Workers of the World's newspaper, Solidarity, claimed that opposing the draft would destroy the union through government repression. Other Board members argued that organized labor would not have the power to stop the war until more workers were organized, and the union should continue to focus on organizing workers at the point of production, even if their actions might incidentally impede the war effort.

Little refused to back down on this issue and argued that "...the IWW is opposed to all wars, and we must use all our power to prevent the workers from joining the army." He planned to go to Butte, Montana, to support union organizing after the Speculator Mine Disaster on June 8, 1917, where 168 men died. A fire began in the Granite Mountain shaft of the Spectacular Mine owned by North Butte Mining Company. Sealed bulkheads prevented men from escaping toxic fumes in the various levels of the mine. Afterwards, mine workers formed a new union, Metal Mine Workers' Union, and were joined in a strike by other trades.

Prior to Little's arrival in Butte, on July 12, 1917, about 1200 striking mine workers in Arizona were rounded up and deported to New Mexico. Xenophobia, especially against German Americans, pervaded the nation. Mine operators used the volatile atmosphere as an excuse to deport striking miners, "undesirables" or immigrants that were perceived to be a threat. Little had broken his ankle and was not part of the Bisbee Deportation but visited organizers in Miami, Arizona, before leaving for Butte, Montana. He also suffered from a double hernia after being jumped and kicked in El Paso, Texas. By some accounts, he carried 135 pounds on his 5'11" frame and was in terrible pain.

The day before the Bisbee deportation, Frank purchased a seat in the Pullman Berth to Salt Lake City. He was unable to travel by side-door Pullman anymore because of his current physical state. He was still recovering from his hernias as well as a broken ankle. On the day he left for Butte, Frank contacted Arizona's Governor Campbell about his protest to the Bisbee deportation. Frank wrote, "If you, as governor, cannot uphold the law, we will take same into our own hands. Will you act or must we?"

In this physical condition, on July 18, 1917, Little arrived in Butte to help organize the copper miners' union and lead the miners' strike against Anaconda Mining Company for better safety conditions and higher wages, abolition of the contract system, and removal of the "rustling card." The striking workers had been subject to attack by a "home guard" organized by the company, and newspapers worked to undermine public support for the workers. Little created a picket line at the mines, persuaded women to join the lines, and ultimately encouraged the other trades to join the strike. During this period, he also spoke out against US involvement in the war, calling soldiers serving in Europe "Uncle Sam's scabs in uniform." This raised the ire of the press and Anaconda Mining Company officials, who did not want the copper output affected.

== Lynching ==
In the early hours of August 1, 1917, six masked men broke into Nora Byrne's Steel Block boardinghouse where Frank Little was staying. The men initially kicked in the wrong door in the boardinghouse, and when confronted by Byrne claimed to be law officers. Little was beaten in his room and abducted while still in his underwear. He was bundled into a car which sped away.

Little was later tied to the car's rear bumper and dragged over the granite blocks of the street. Photographs of his body show that his knee-caps had possibly been scraped off. Little was taken to Milwaukee Bridge at the edge of town where he was then hanged from a railroad trestle. The coroner found that Little died of asphyxiation. It was also found that his skull had been fractured by a blow to the back of the head caused by a rifle or gun butt. A note with the words "First and last warning" was pinned to his thigh, referring to earlier vigilantes giving people three warnings to leave town. The note also included the numbers 3-7-77 (a sign of Vigilantes active in the 19th century in Virginia City, Montana, which some people thought referred to grave measurements), and the initials of other union leaders, suggesting they were next to be killed. This was the first hanging of a militant labor leader in America since Haymarket, which occurred on May 4, 1886.

The attorney for the Metal Mine Workers said after Little's murder that the union had received warnings about Joe Shannon, Tom Campbell, and another man.

Although no one was apprehended or prosecuted for Little's lynching, a number of people have speculated about his murder. The author Dashiell Hammett was working as a strikebreaker in Butte for Pinkerton's, and allegedly turned down an offer of $5,000 to assassinate Little. Hammett later made use of his experiences in Butte to write Red Harvest. Rory Carroll writes, "In her memoirs Lillian Hellman, Hammett's companion, said he told her about the offer to murder Little. 'Through the years he was to repeat that bribe offer so many times that I came to believe … that it was a kind of key to his life. He had given a man the right to think he would commit murder.'" William Nolan, one of Hammett's biographers, thinks that "the fact that someone even asked him, thinking that he would be that kind of person, and that he was that deep into the thing made him feel guilty. He never got over and it always haunted him."

Union leaders who had seen Little's body at the time insisted that one of the murderers was Billy Oates, a notorious hired thug employed by Anaconda. The rationale for Oates' involvement was a small hole at the back of Little's head that had been "inflicted by the steel hook used by Oates on the stub of his amputated right arm."

Over the next nine years two more men were named as possibly being involved in Little's lynching. At the time of the 1918 Industrial Workers of the World conspiracy trial in Chicago, the union's lawyers questioned why Ed Morrissey, who had been Butte's chief of detectives at the time of the murder, had taken a twenty-day leave of absence on the day following the killing. It was alleged at the trial that Morrissey had scratches on his face. The autopsy of Little's body had found that he had tried to fight off his assailants and that he had someone's skin under his fingernails. In 1926, William F. Dunne identified Peter Prlja as one of the "death squad." Prlja was at the time a motorcycle officer in the Butte police department and like Oates had worked as a security guard for Anaconda.

An estimated 10,000 workers lined the route of Frank Little's funeral procession, which was followed by 3,500 more persons. The funeral is still the largest ever in Butte history. He was buried in Butte's Mountain View Cemetery. His grave marker reads "Slain by capitalist interests for organizing and inspiring his fellow men."

=== Effects ===
Little's assassination gained national attention and was widely spread throughout the community of the Industrial Workers of the World (IWW). In the wake of the news, reporters awaited on Bill Haywood, the founding member of the IWW, and what he had to say regarding the lynching. Haywood wrote an editorial for Solidarity the same day as Frank's death, stating that Frank was murdered for taking part in the strike at Butte, Montana. Haywood goes on to say, "The tragic, brutal death of Frank Little will unite the working forces of this country against the masters of bread. He has not died in vain, and with his blood will be written the abolition of the wage system." Bill Haywood used Little's death as an advancement for the IWW to gain popularity and strengthen the loyalty amongst members. In addition, Bill Haywood felt Little's body should be buried in Butte, where his grave would promote positive propaganda for the IWW and be safe from mobs. For the time following Little's death, IWW members shouted, "We never forget!" as a rally cry in honor of Little.

== Legacy ==
- Travis Wilkerson's 2002 documentary film An Injury to One tells the story of Frank Little and his lynching in Butte, Montana.
- Season one of the podcast Death in the West, hosted by Montana-natives Chad Dundas, Erika Fredrickson, Leif Fredrickson, and Zach Dundas, tells the story of Little's murder in Butte, Montana. They also discuss the larger context of unionist actions and labor disputes in the late 19th and early 20th centuries.
- Frank Little is a character in Jess Walter's 2020 historical fiction novel The Cold Millions.
- Frank Little is also a character in John Jakes's 1989 historical fiction novel California Gold.

== See also ==
- Anti-union violence
- Wesley Everest
- Anaconda Copper
- List of worker deaths in United States labor disputes
