= Anaconda Copper Mine (Montana) =

Copper mine in Butte, Montana, US

Coordinates: 46°01′02″N 112°30′37″W

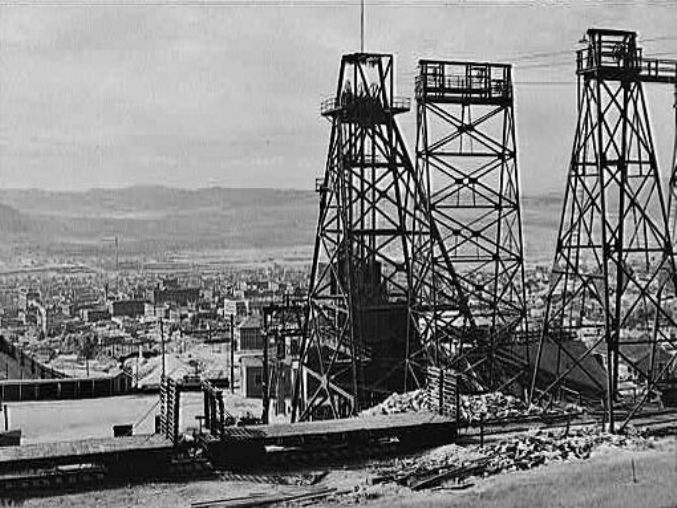
Anaconda headframes overlooking the city of Butte. HAER photo

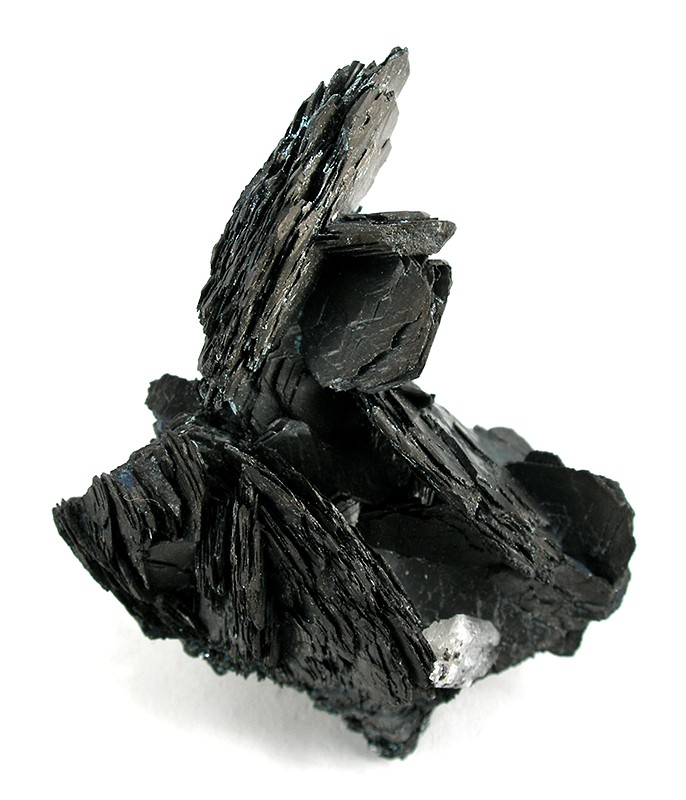
Chalcocite replacing covellite, said to be found in 1883, in the early days of mining at Butte. Size 8.0 x 6.3 x 3.6 cm.

The Anaconda Copper Mine was a large copper mine in Butte, Montana that closed operations in 1947 and was eventually consumed by the Berkeley Pit, a vast open-pit mine. Originally a silver mine, it was bought for $30,000 in 1881 by an Irish immigrant named Marcus Daly from Michael Hickey, a Civil War veteran, and co-owner Charles X. Larabie. From this beginning Daly, along with partners George Hearst, James Ben Ali Haggin and Lloyd Tevis, created the Anaconda Copper Mining Company, which ultimately became a global mining enterprise that would go on to mine 18 billion pounds of copper over 100 years. At the height of The Anaconda Copper Mining Company, it consisted of the Anaconda and other Butte mines, a smelter at Anaconda, Montana, processing plants in Great Falls, Montana, the American Brass Company, and many other properties spanning multiple countries.

The Anaconda Copper Mining Company was acquired by ARCO in 1977.

F. Augustus Heinze, an investor who had come to Montana to capitalize on the mining industry, used the apex theory in several lawsuits to lay claim to ore from the Anaconda Mines. Heinze purchased a small parcel of unclaimed land on top of Butte Hill. In actions upheld by several Butte judges, he was able to take copper ore that was in the Anaconda company's shafts. After years of losing lawsuits to Heinze, the company shut down all operations in the state. They put nearly 80% of the state workforce out of work in order to force the state legislature to adopt a "change of venue" provision for lawsuits. Eventually, the company bought out all of Heinze's properties and claims.

== See also ==
- Anaconda Road Massacre
- Butte, Anaconda and Pacific Railway
