= National Register of Historic Places listings in Deer Lodge County, Montana =

Location of Deer Lodge County in Montana

This is a list of the National Register of Historic Places listings in Deer Lodge County, Montana. It is intended to be a complete list of the properties and districts on the National Register of Historic Places in Deer Lodge County, Montana, United States. All sites are located in the city of Anaconda, which is consolidated with Deer Lodge County. The locations of National Register properties and districts for which the latitude and longitude coordinates are included below, may be seen in a map.

There are 35 properties and districts listed on the National Register in the county, including 1 National Historic Landmark.

This National Park Service list is complete through NPS recent listings posted May 2, 2025.

== Listings county-wide ==
	Name on the Register	Image	Date listed	Location	City or town	Description
1	Alpine Apartments	Alpine Apartments	October 30, 1998 (#98001299)	200 Hickory; 46°07′46″N 112°57′13″W	Anaconda	
2	Anaconda Commercial Historic District	Anaconda Commercial Historic District	February 25, 1998 (#98000155)	Roughly bounded by Commercial Ave., Main St., Chestnut St., and E. Park Ave. 46°07′46″N 112°56′57″W	Anaconda	
3	Anaconda Copper Mining Company Smoke Stack	Anaconda Copper Mining Company Smoke Stack	April 9, 1987 (#87000607)	Anaconda Copper Smelter; 46°06′37″N 112°54′47″W	Anaconda	
4	Anaconda Saddle Club	Anaconda Saddle Club	January 24, 2007 (#06001296)	2704 Montana Highway 1, W. 46°09′22″N 113°02′07″W	Anaconda	
5	Ancient Order of Hibernians Hall	Ancient Order of Hibernians Hall	August 10, 1979 (#79003721)	321-323 E. Commercial; 46°07′46″N 112°56′54″W	Anaconda	
6	Barich Block	Barich Block	January 19, 1983 (#83001058)	416-420 E. Park Ave. 46°07′47″N 112°57′05″W	Anaconda	
7	Branscombe Automobile Machine Shop	Branscombe Automobile Machine Shop	December 18, 2000 (#00001522)	125 W. Commercial; 46°07′56″N 112°57′14″W	Anaconda	
8	Butte, Anaconda and Pacific Railway Historic District	Butte, Anaconda and Pacific Railway Historic District	October 13, 1988 (#88001111)	Right-of-way begins in Butte and travels to Anaconda, generally along the course of Silver Bow Creek; 46°02′37″N 112°44′25″W	Anaconda	Extends into Silver Bow County
9	Butte-Anaconda Historic District	Butte-Anaconda Historic District	October 15, 1966 (#66000438)	Most of the developed areas of Anaconda, Butte, and Walkerville; 46°07′45″N 112°57′10″W	Anaconda	Extends into Silver Bow County
10	California Creek Quarry		January 20, 1989 (#88003140)	Address restricted	Anaconda	
11	City Hall	City Hall	August 10, 1979 (#79003722)	401 E. Commercial; 46°07′46″N 112°56′51″W	Anaconda	
12	Club Moderne	Club Moderne	August 14, 1986 (#86001498)	811 E. Park; 46°07′40″N 112°56′38″W	Anaconda	Heavily damaged by fire October 3, 2016
13	James V. Collins House	James V. Collins House	December 18, 2000 (#00001521)	422 W. 3rd St. 46°07′52″N 112°57′31″W	Anaconda	
14	Davidson Building	Davidson Building	January 19, 1983 (#83001059)	301-303 E. Park St. 46°07′47″N 112°57′14″W	Anaconda	
15	Deer Lodge County Courthouse	Deer Lodge County Courthouse	December 29, 1978 (#78001681)	U.S. Route 10; 46°07′21″N 112°57′18″W	Anaconda	
16	Driver's Saloon and Café	Driver's Saloon and Café	February 7, 2023 (#100008428)	104-106 East Commercial Ave. 46°07′49″N 112°57′09″W	Anaconda	
17	Theodore Eck House	Theodore Eck House	October 30, 1998 (#98001298)	1217 W. 4th St. 46°07′48″N 112°58′10″W	Anaconda	
18	John Furst House	John Furst House	October 30, 1998 (#98001296)	1403 W. 3rd St. 46°07′53″N 112°58′16″W	Anaconda	
19	Glenn's Dam Historic District		March 16, 2020 (#100005107)	North Cable Rd., less than 1/4 mi. north of northwest end of town 46°08′32″N 112°58′59″W	Anaconda vicinity	
20	Glover Cabin	Glover Cabin	December 18, 2000 (#00001524)	Washoe Park; 46°08′10″N 112°57′56″W	Anaconda	
21	Goosetown Historic District	Goosetown Historic District	February 25, 1998 (#98000156)	Roughly bounded by Cedar St., Monroe St., the Birch Hill Allotment, and E. Commercial Ave. 46°07′28″N 112°56′35″W	Anaconda	
22	Granite Apartments	Granite Apartments	December 18, 2000 (#00001517)	214 E. 3rd St. 46°07′48″N 112°57′04″W	Anaconda	
23	Hearst Free Library	Hearst Free Library	June 4, 1973 (#73001051)	Main and 4th Sts. 46°07′37″N 112°57′09″W	Anaconda	
24	Lorraine Apartments	Lorraine Apartments	December 18, 2000 (#00001520)	218 E. 3rd 46°07′47″N 112°57′02″W	Anaconda	
25	Duncan Matheson House	Duncan Matheson House	October 30, 1998 (#98001295)	1300 W. 3rd St. 46°07′53″N 112°58′10″W	Anaconda	
26	Methodist Episcopal Church of Anaconda	Methodist Episcopal Church of Anaconda	July 29, 1994 (#94000783)	Junction of Oak and E. 3rd Sts. 46°07′42″N 112°57′02″W	Anaconda	
27	Morel Bridge		December 12, 2000 (#00001491)	25200 East Side Rd. 46°09′28″N 112°46′16″W	Anaconda	
28	The New Brunswick House	The New Brunswick House	December 18, 2000 (#00001514)	325 E. Front; 46°07′56″N 112°56′54″W	Anaconda	
29	Sheehan Boardinghouse	Sheehan Boardinghouse	December 18, 2000 (#00001519)	412 E. 3rd St. 46°07′42″N 112°56′54″W	Anaconda	
30	St. Mark's Episcopal Church	St. Mark's Episcopal Church	December 29, 1978 (#78001682)	601 Main St. 46°07′29″N 112°57′14″W	Anaconda	
31	US Post Office-Anaconda Main	US Post Office-Anaconda Main	March 14, 1986 (#86000677)	218 Main St. 46°07′44″N 112°57′09″W	Anaconda	
32	George Waddell House	George Waddell House	October 30, 1998 (#98001300)	506 W. 3rd St. 46°07′46″N 112°57′30″W	Anaconda	
33	Washoe Theater	Washoe Theater	April 30, 1982 (#82003162)	305 Main St. 46°07′39″N 112°57′08″W	Anaconda	
34	West Side Historic District	West Side Historic District	April 28, 1998 (#98000396)	Roughly bounded by Main St., W. 8th St., W. Park Ave., and Maple St. 46°07′33″N 112°57′17″W	Anaconda	
35	Zion Swedish Evangelical Lutheran Church	Zion Swedish Evangelical Lutheran Church	October 30, 1998 (#98001297)	524 Cedar St. 46°07′29″N 112°56′57″W	Anaconda	

== Former listings ==
	Name on the Register	Image	Date listed	Date removed	Location	City or town	Description
1	Montana Hotel, briefly Marcus Daly Hotel	Montana Hotel, briefly Marcus Daly Hotel	April 26, 1973 (#73001052)	June 18, 1979	Park Ave. and S. Main St.	Anaconda	Briefly known as the Marcus Daly Hotel in the 1970s, the structure lost a significant amount of its original character when the upper two floors were removed
2	Durston Block and Annex	Durston Block and Annex	January 18, 1984 (#84002461)	June 3, 1986	201-205 1/2 Main St.	Anaconda	Destroyed by fire on February 9, 1985.

== See also ==
- List of National Historic Landmarks in Montana
- National Register of Historic Places listings in Montana
