= Hibernian Hall =

Hibernian Hall may refer to:

in the United States

- Hibernian Hall (Charleston, South Carolina)
- Hibernia Hall, Davenport, Iowa, also known as Hibernian Hall
- St. Michael's Church, Cemetery, Rectory and Ancient Order of Hibernians Hall, Parnell, Iowa
- Hibernian Hall (Boston, Massachusetts)
- Ancient Order of Hibernians Hall, Anaconda, Montana, also known as Hibernian Hall
- Wonder Ballroom, Portland, Oregon, also known and listed on the National Register of Historic Places as Hibernian Hall

in Australia

- Hibernian Hall, Roma, a community hall in Roma, Maranoa Region, Queensland, Australia

== See also ==
- List of Hibernian buildings
