= KQRV =

Radio station in Deer Lodge–Butte, Montana

Coordinates: 46.101°N 112.951°W

- Deer Lodge, Montana; United States
- Broadcast area: Butte, Montana
- Frequency: 96.9 MHz
- Branding: 96.9 The River

Programming
- Format: Oldies

Ownership
- Owner: Michelle and Ron Davis; (Butte Broadcasting Incorporated)

History
- First air date: July 4, 1997

Technical information
- Licensing authority: FCC
- Facility ID: 79010
- Class: C1
- ERP: 20,000 watts
- HAAT: 300 meters (980 ft)
- Translator: 99.3 K257AF (Butte)

Links
- Public license information: Public file; LMS

KQRV (96.9 FM, "The River") is a commercial radio station licensed to Deer Lodge, Montana, United States, broadcasting to the Butte, Montana area. KQRV airs a soft oldies format.

KQRV-FM originally signed on in the mid-1980s and was licensed to serve the community of Deer Lodge, Montana. In its early years, the station operated with a variety of formats, including adult contemporary and country, before eventually settling into its long-term identity as "The River." The station currently broadcasts a Classic Hits format, focusing on popular music from the 1970s, 80s, and 90s. In August 2017, KQRV changed its format from country to a smooth gold based oldies format but still kept the River brand.

The station was previously owned by Jimmy Ray Carroll under the name Jimmy Ray Carroll Trust, which also held interests in other regional stations like KGLM. In 2014, the station was acquired by Townsquare Media as part of a larger cluster acquisition in the Butte and Missoula markets. This ownership transition integrated KQRV into a group that includes sister stations KAAR and KMBR.

In late 2020, KQRV-FM went silent following the death of its owner, Robert Cummings Toole, who died on November 20, 2020. Because Toole died without a will, the station's broadcast license was involuntarily transferred to Karen L. Toole to oversee the estate while legal counsel managed the FCC filings. By 2022, the station returned to the airwaves under the ownership of Butte Broadcasting Inc., the same company that operates KBOW and KOPR. This programming is designed to mirror the style of the "True Oldies Channel," a nationally syndicated network created by Scott Shannon that features a hybrid of oldies and classic hits.
