= Elks Building (Anaconda, Montana) =

- U.S. Historic district – Contributing property
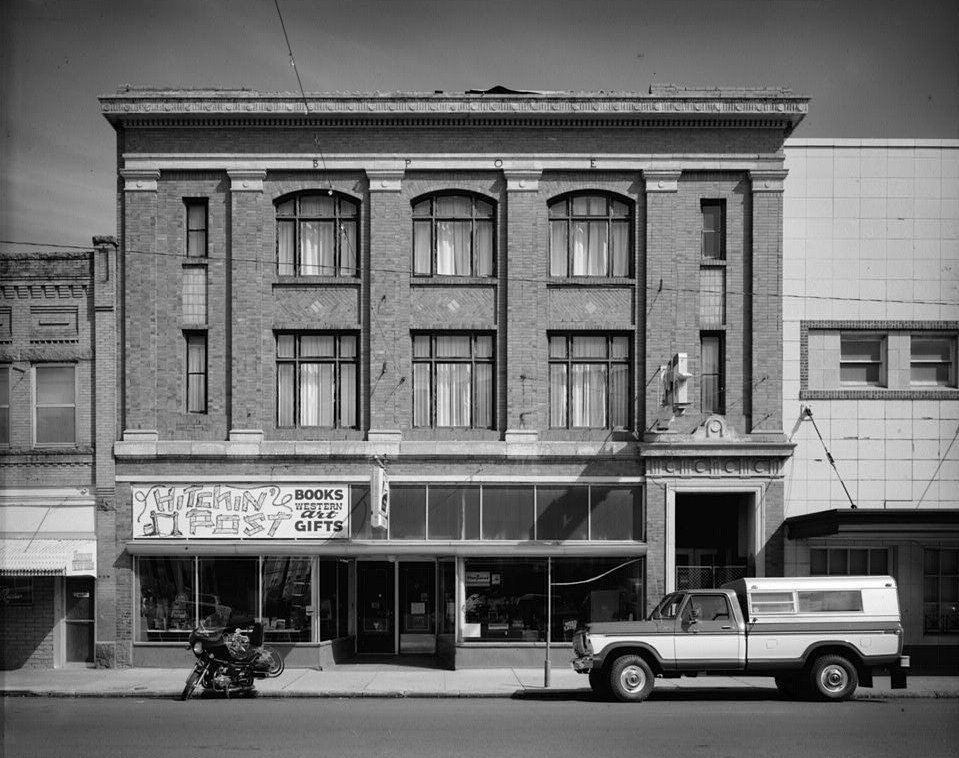
- Elks Building
- Location: 217 Main Street, Anaconda, Montana
- Built: 1914
- Part of: Butte-Anaconda Historic District (ID66000438)
- Added to NRHP: October 15, 1966

The Elks Building in Anaconda, Montana was a historic building built in 1914. It is a 3-story brick building that is a contributing property in the Butte-Anaconda Historic District. It was headquarters of the Anaconda Elks until 1964, when it was transferred to the Knights of Columbus.

== See also ==
- Ancient Order of Hibernians Hall: Another fraternal hall in Anaconda
