= Lorraine Apartments =

Lorraine Apartments may refer to:

- Lorraine Apartments (Anaconda, Montana), listed on the National Register of Historic Places in Deer Lodge County, Montana
- Lorraine Apartments (Philadelphia, Pennsylvania), listed on the National Register of Historic Places in Philadelphia County, Pennsylvania
