= Ancient Order of Hibernians Hall =

- U.S. National Register of Historic Places
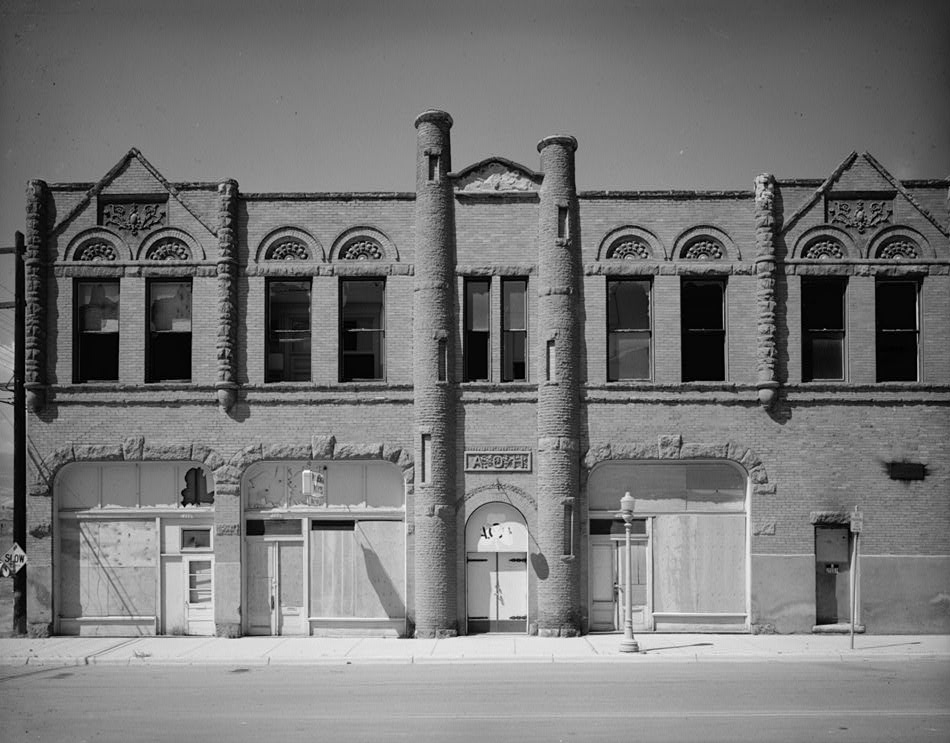
- 1979 Photo

- Location within Montana Location within the United States
- Location: 321-323 East Commercial; Anaconda, Montana; United States
- Coordinates: 46°7′46″N 112°56′54″W
- Area: 0.1 acres (0.040 ha)
- Built: 1896-1899
- Architectural style: Queen Anne, Romanesque
- NRHP reference No.: 79003721
- Added to NRHP: August 10, 1979

The Ancient Order of Hibernians Hall, also known as Hibernian Hall, was a historic building in Anaconda, Montana, United States, that is listed on the National Register of Historic Places.

== Description ==
The hall is located at 321-323 East Commercial Avenue, within the Anaconda Commercial Historic District. It was built during 1896–1899 at a cost of $30,000 (equivalent to $1,161,000 in 2025). The two-story 50 feet (15 m) by 80 feet (24 m) building includes elements of Queen Anne style architecture in the United States and Romanesque architecture. Its first floor included five store spaces, two that are 25 feet (7.6 m) wide on Commercial Avenue and three on Cedar Street. The lodge room on the second floor was accessed by an entrance on Cedar Street. It cost $30,000 to build and was opened with a grand ball on February 9, 1899. The Anaconda Standard proclaimed it to have the "'finest and largest dance hall in the state'" and for it to be "'one of the handsomest buildings in the City of Anaconda'" with its new floor asserted to be a "'marvel of beauty and artistic workmanship'".

It was listed on the National Register of Historic Places in 1979 but was demolished in 1984 to make way for a parking lot for the adjacent Family Dollar store. The current AOH hall is physically located at 229 East Commercial Avenue but continues to use its former mailing address.

== See also ==
- National Register of Historic Places listings in Deer Lodge County, Montana
- List of Hibernian buildings
- Elks Building (Anaconda, Montana), another fraternal hall in Anaconda
