= Washoe Theater =

Historic movie theater in Anaconda, Montana, US

- U.S. National Register of Historic Places
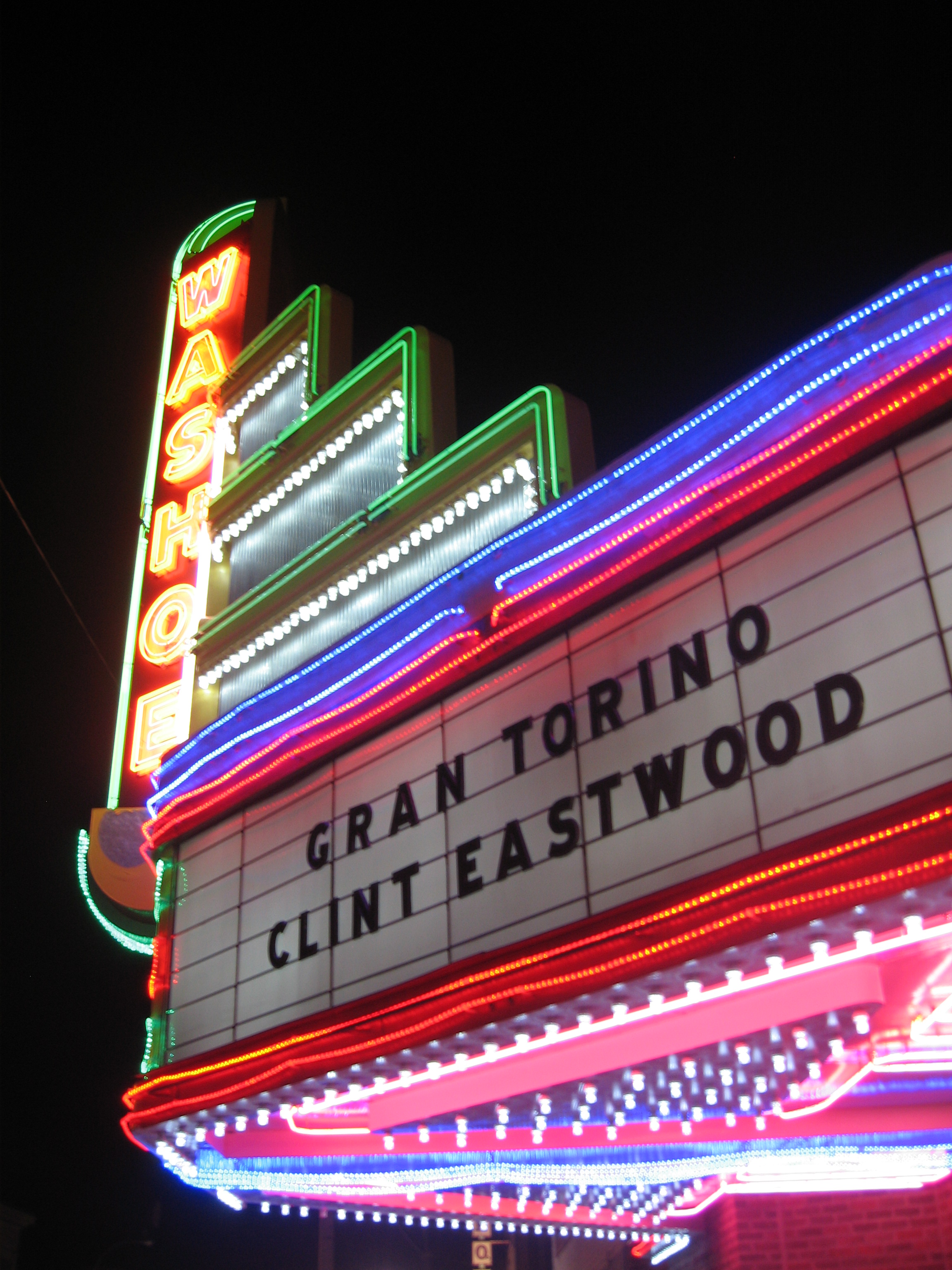
- The theater's marquis, March 2009

- Location within Montana Location within the United States
- Location: 305 Main Street; Anaconda, Montana; United States
- Coordinates: 46°07′41″N 112°57′11″W
- Built: 1931
- Architect: B. Marcus Priteca
- NRHP reference No.: 82003162
- Added to NRHP: April 30, 1982

The Washoe Theater is a historic movie theater in Anaconda, Montana, United States, that is listed on the National Register of Historic Places.

== Description ==
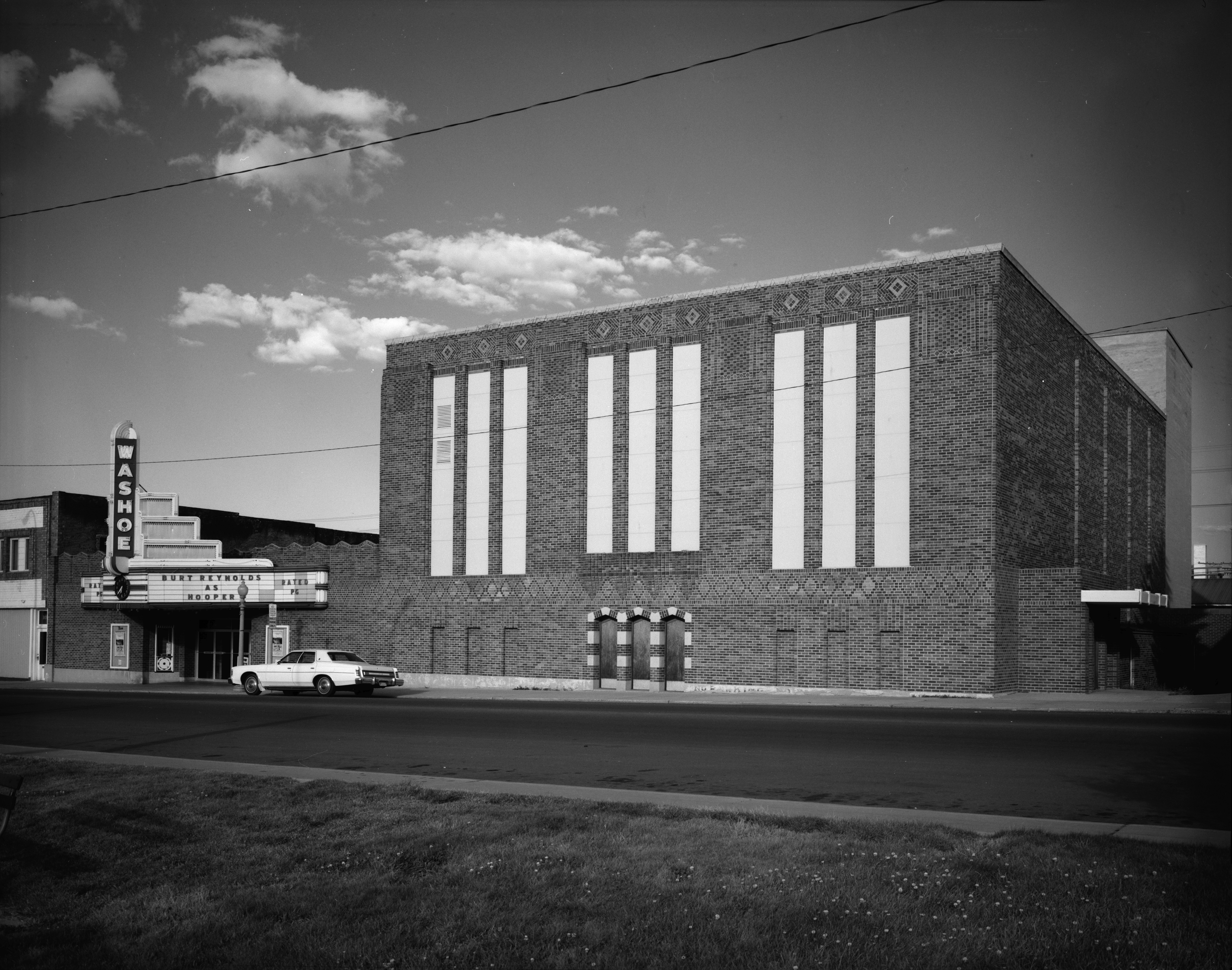
The Washoe Theater, 1979

The theater is located at 305 Main Street, within the Anaconda Commercial Historic District. It was the last theater constructed in the United States in the Nuevo Deco (a form of Art Deco) style. The theater was designed in 1930 by Seattle architect B. Marcus Priteca. It was almost entirely finished by 1931, but its opening was delayed until Thursday, September 24, 1936 because of the Great Depression. In 1936 dollars, its construction cost was $200,000 (equivalent to $4,640,000 in 2025). The Smithsonian rates the Washoe as a national treasure due to the lavish interior. On April 30, 1982, the Washoe was listed on the United States National Register of Historic Places for architectural significance.

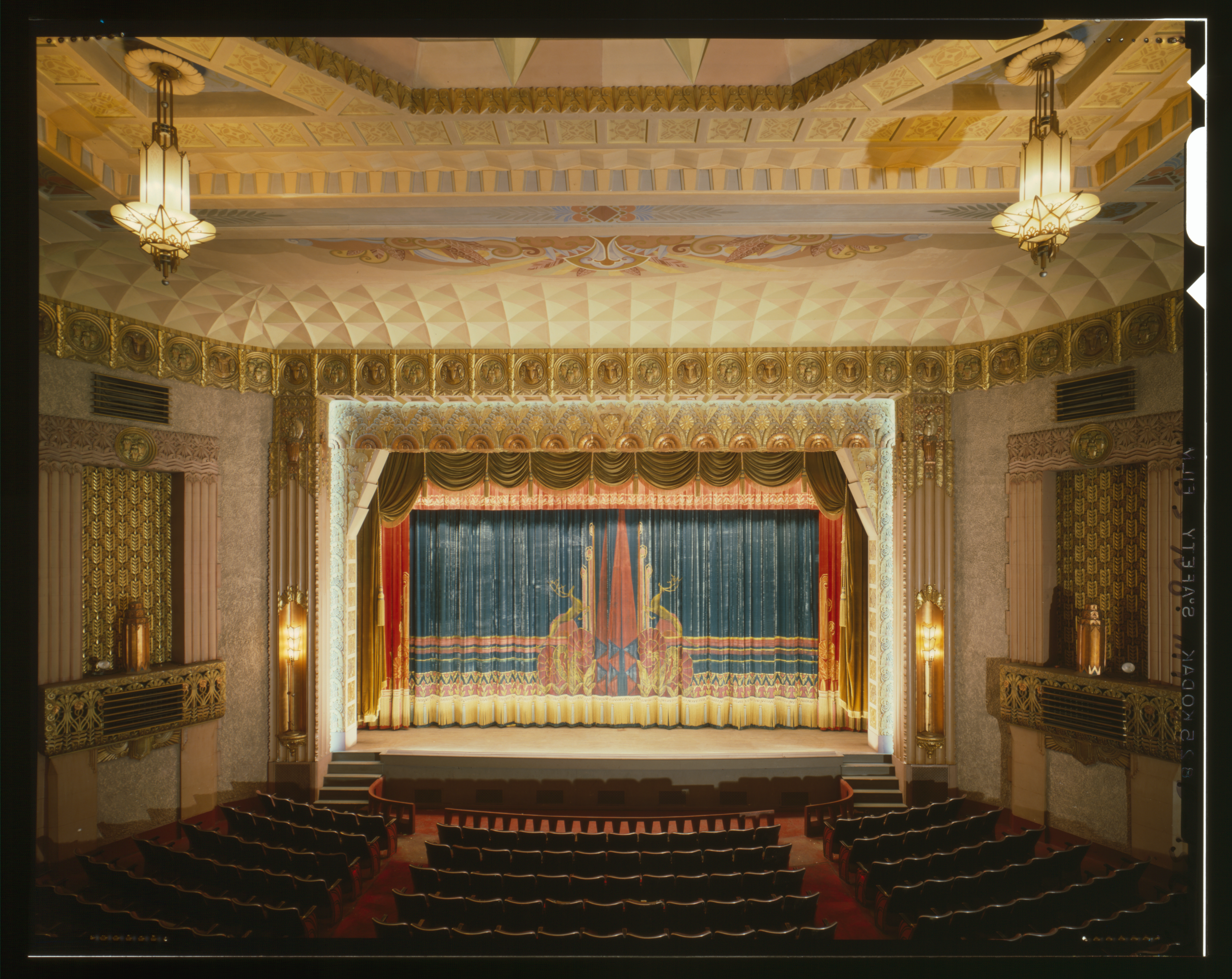
General interior view of the theater, 1979

The interior design and furnishings were done by Hollywood theater designer Nat Smythe. The exterior doors are etched glass. Each joint and trim work is carved in complicated relief patterns with much use of ornamental ironwork. Use of copper is especially prevalent, as Anaconda was a company town for the Anaconda Copper Mining Company. Silver and gold leaf supplement the accent work. Carved rams heads line the walls. Every flat surface, including the domed ceiling, is a painted mural done by Colville Smythe.

The silk curtain is a piece of art in itself, though seldom seen. Its age presents a problem for curators who are afraid that taking it down, even to try and restore it, would cause it to fall apart. It has a painting of deer stags.

The theater was also designed to have near perfect acoustics. The delay in opening allowed the sound system to be re-designed as a showcase for Western Electric's newest innovation "Mirrophonic Sound". Recorded sound with films was itself a relatively new innovation, so the creation of a high-fidelity audio system was quite remarkable for 1936.

== History ==
The site of the Washoe Theater was the site of two previous theaters in Anaconda. The Margaret Theater existed on the site since near the founding of the town. It was re-modeled in 1927 at a cost of $60,000 and renamed the Sundial Theater only to burn down in 1929.

The first movie to play in the Washoe was a Western, The Texas Rangers starring Fred MacMurray as a Texas Ranger. The Washoe still operates as a movie theater today.

== See also ==
- National Register of Historic Places listings in Deer Lodge County, Montana
