= Branscombe Automobile Machine Shop =

- U.S. National Register of Historic Places
- Location within Montana Location within the United States
- Location: 125 West Commercial, Anaconda, Montana
- Coordinates: 46°07′56″N 112°57′14″W
- Area: less than one acre
- Built: 1916
- Built by: Clifton, Applegate & Toole
- Architectural style: Early Commercial
- MPS: Anaconda MPS
- NRHP reference No.: 00001522
- Added to NRHP: December 18, 2000

The Branscombe Automobile Machine Shop, located at 125 West Commercial in Anaconda, Montana, was built in 1916. The former machine shop was listed on the National Register of Historic Places in 2000. It has also been known as Brewery Antiques & Western Montana Fur Center.

It is a two-story, brick, rectangular Early Commercial-style building. It has a stepped parapet wall and brick pilasters defining each of its three bays on front facade and five bays of length. It had the first substantial freight elevator in Anaconda.
