= Barich Block =

- U.S. National Register of Historic Places
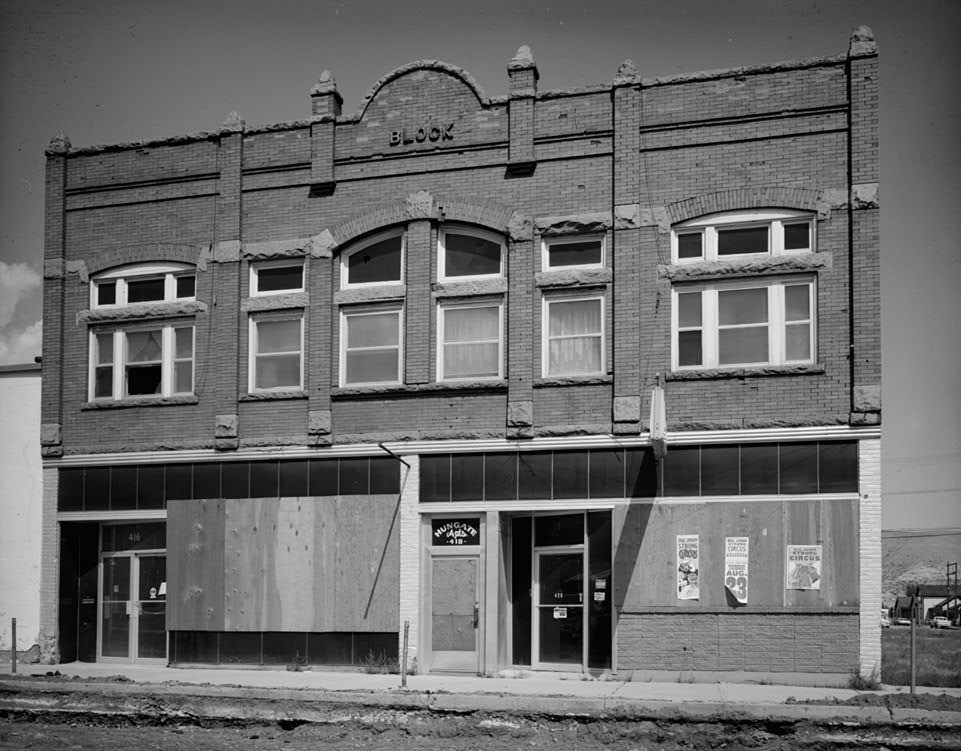

- Location within Montana Location within the United States
- Location: 416-420 E. Park Ave., Anaconda, Montana
- Coordinates: 46°7′47″N 112°57′5″W
- Area: 0.2 acres (0.081 ha)
- Built: 1893
- Built by: Dwyer, Daniel; Cosgrove, John
- NRHP reference No.: 83001058
- Added to NRHP: January 19, 1983

The Barich Block is a commercial block built in 1893 in Anaconda, Montana. It was built by brick masons Daniel Dwyer and John Cosgrove. It was listed on the National Register of Historic Places in 1983. It was deemed "Noteworthy as one of the first large commercial buildings constructed on the east end of the downtown area, for its associations with the development of commerce, and for its architectural integrity."
