= KGLM-FM =

Radio station in Anaconda–Butte, Montana

Coordinates: 46.101°N 112.951°W

- Anaconda, Montana; United States
- Broadcast area: Butte, Montana
- Frequency: 97.7 MHz
- Branding: Magic 97.7 & 100.3

Programming
- Format: Top 40
- Affiliations: Premiere Networks

Ownership
- Owner: Butte Broadcasting, Inc.
- Sister stations: KBOW, KOPR

History
- First air date: January 18, 1974

Technical information
- Licensing authority: FCC
- Facility ID: 669
- Class: C3
- ERP: 2,750 watts
- HAAT: 300 meters (980 ft)

Links
- Public license information: Public file; LMS
- Website: www.magic97.net

KGLM-FM (97.7 FM, "Magic 97.7 & 100.3") is a commercial radio station in Anaconda, Montana, broadcasting to the Butte, Montana, area playing CHR-Pop music. The station, established in 1974, is currently owned by Butte Broadcasting, Inc. The main offices and studios of Butte Broadcasting are at 660 Dewey in Butte. The transmitter site is north of Sheep Gulch Road in Anaconda, Montana.

== FM Translator ==
KGLM relays its programming to an FM translator in order to improve coverage.

Broadcast translator for KGLM-FM
Call sign	Frequency	City of license	FID	ERP (W)	HAAT	Class	FCC info
K262AB	100.3 FM	Walkerville, Montana	65777	99	7 m (23 ft)	D	LMS

== History ==
The station first signed on the air on January 18, 1974, and was originally licensed to the city of Anaconda, Montana. During its early years, the station predominantly broadcast country music before shifting through various contemporary formats as the market evolved. In 1979, the station was sold by Radio Station KANA to Anaconda Broadcasting Inc. for a reported price of $300,000. A significant change occurred in December 2006, when Butte Broadcasting Inc., led by Ron Davis, reached a deal to acquire KGLM-FM and KANA-AM from Jimmy Ray Carroll for $500,000. This acquisition brought KGLM under the same local management as Butte staples KBOW and KOPR. With the debut of 96.9 "The River", the station flipped to an Adult top 40 format in 2002, focusing on current pop mixed with retro hits due to a hole in the market, As the 2000s went on the station moved more closer to top 40 and leaned more and more toward top 40 before becoming a CHR station in 2010.

KGLM-FM airs the "Hits Now!" music format from Westwood One and is Butte's home for American Top 40.

The station operates on a frequency of 97.7 MHz and is a Class C3 station. It broadcasts with an Effective Radiated Power (ERP) of 2,750 watts.
