= Anaconda City Hall =

- City Hall
- U.S. National Register of Historic Places
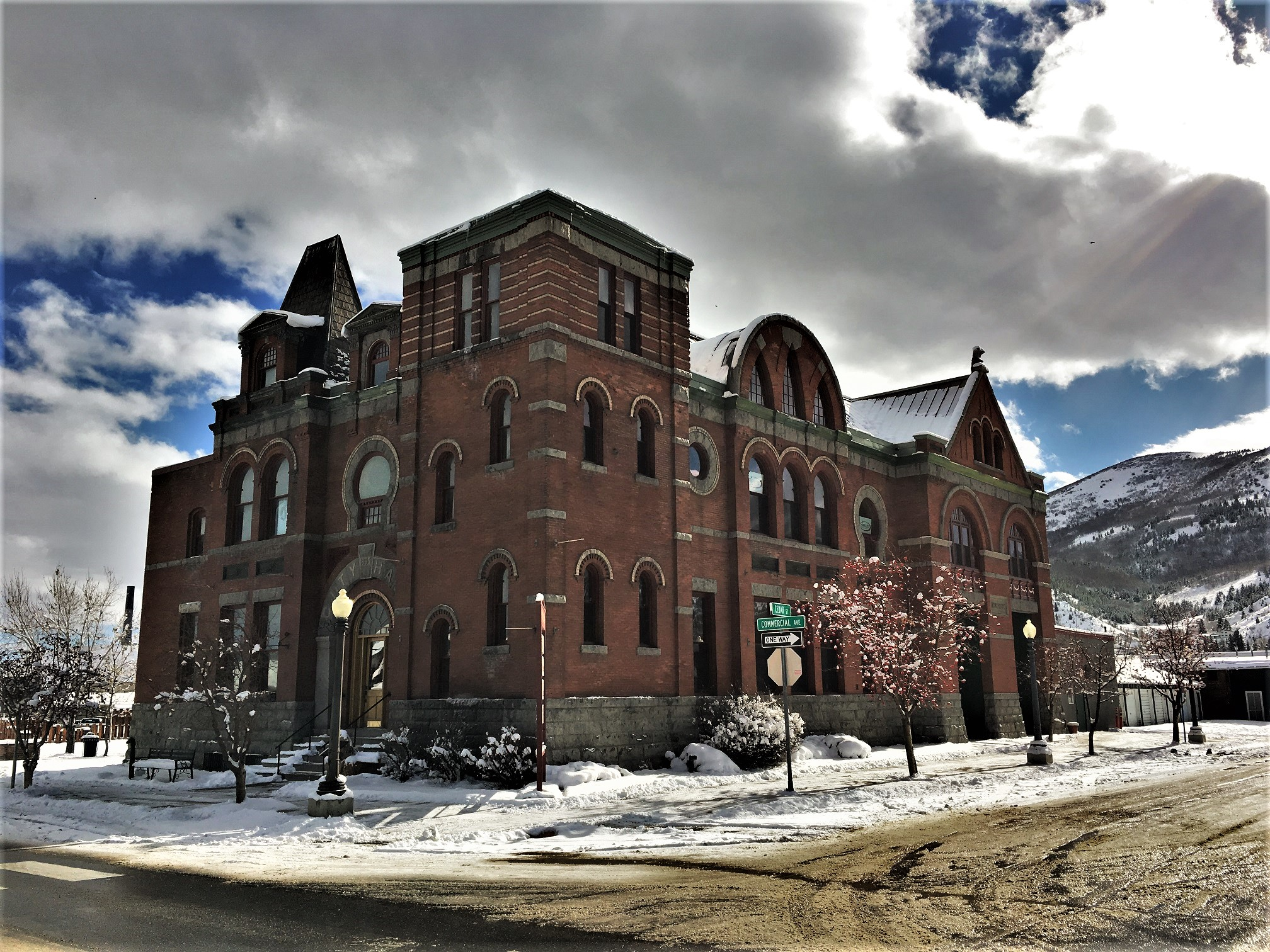

- Location within Montana Location within the United States
- Location: 401 E. Commercial, Anaconda, Montana
- Coordinates: 46°7′46″N 112°56′51″W
- Area: 0.3 acres (0.12 ha)
- Built: 1895
- Built by: Jacobson & Co.
- Architect: Reber, Collins W.
- Architectural style: Late Victorian
- NRHP reference No.: 79003722
- Added to NRHP: August 10, 1979

The Anaconda City Hall, located at 401 E. Commercial in Anaconda, Montana, was built in 1895. It was listed on the National Register of Historic Places in 1979. It is also a contributing building in the Anaconda Commercial Historic District, NRHP-listed in 1998.

It is Late Victorian in style, designed by architectural firm Charles Lane & Company's Collins W. Reber and built by Jacobson & Co. It was asserted in 1896 that Lane and Reber "stated the City Hall would be 'the finest municipal building in the State,' and that it would be built in a 'straightforward manner... using local materials:' Anaconda pressed brick, granite, and trimmed with Anaconda copper." It is a 53 by 102 feet (16 m × 31 m) structure. The city hall facade faces onto Commercial Street and includes a 90 feet (27 m) clock tower; a treasurer's office and fire station were located in the west-facing facade.

The building was threatened with demolition in 1978 but was saved by a local group led by Alice Clark Finnegan, which pressed a court action, and was aided by a National Trust for Historic Preservation grant.
