= List of Hibernian buildings =

This is a list of notable buildings of the Ancient Order of Hibernians, which are either meeting places or buildings that are otherwise significant in Hibernian history.

There are many Hibernian-associated buildings. This list contains only those that are significant architecturally or otherwise, including those documented in the National Register of Historic Places or a similar registry.

== In Australia ==
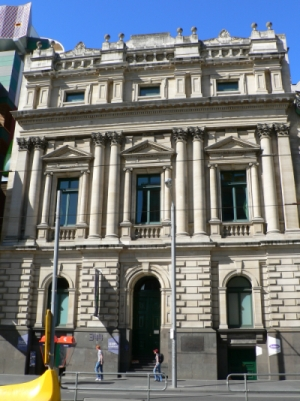
Storey Hall

- Storey Hall, Melbourne

== In the United Kingdom ==
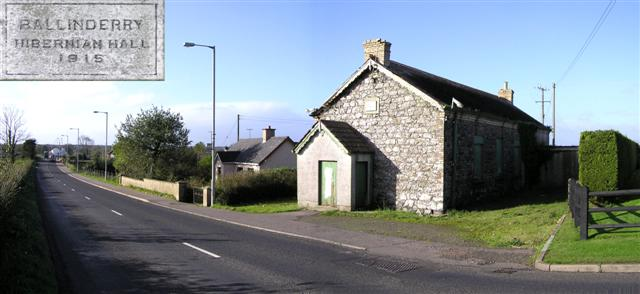
Ballinderry Hibernian Hall

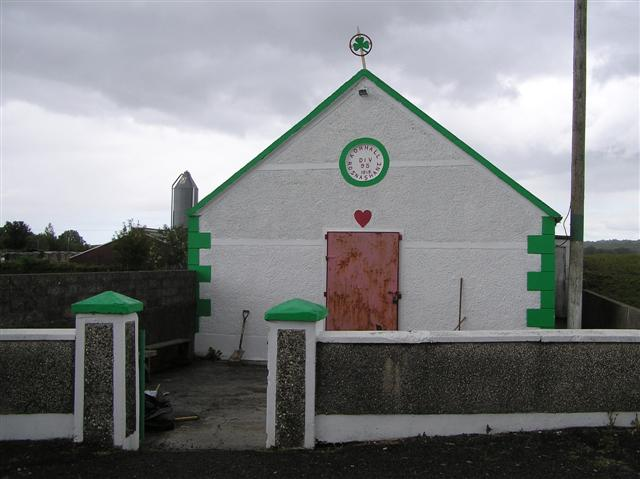
Rosnashane AOH Hall

- Ballinderry Hibernian Hall, Ballinderry, Northern Ireland
- Rosnashane AOH Hall, Rosnashane, Northern Ireland

== In the United States ==
	Building	Image	Dates	Location	City, State	Description
1	St. James' Church (New York City)		1837 built 1966 NYCL-listed; 1972 NRHP-listed	32 James Street; 40°42′44″N 73°59′57″W	New York City	The Order in the United States was founded in New York City May 4, 1836 at St. James Church located near the old Five Points neighborhood. Its existence and activities were concealed for some years. It is believed to have been designed by architect Minard Lafever.
2	Hibernia Hall		1891 built 1983 NRHP-listed	421 Brady Street; 41°31′26″N 90°34′25″W	Davenport, Iowa	Romanesque Revival architecture
3	St. Michael's Church, Cemetery, Rectory and Ancient Order of Hibernians Hall		1899 built 1983 NRHP-listed	County Road F 52; 41°35′24.2″N 91°54′54.57″W	near Parnell, Iowa	Romanesque Revival architecture
4	Hibernian Hall (Boston, Massachusetts)		1913 built 2004 NRHP-listed	182-186 Dudley Street; 42°19′43″N 71°4′57″W	Boston, Massachusetts	NRHP-listed
5	Ancient Order of Hibernians Hall		1899 built 1979 NRHP-listed	321-323 E. Commercial; 46°7′46″N 112°56′54″W	Anaconda, Montana	Queen Anne style, Romanesque Revival architecture
6	Hibernian Hall		1914 built 2005 NRHP-listed	128 NE Russell St. 45°32′26″N 122°39′48″W	Portland, Oregon	Mission/Spanish Revival architecture
7	Hibernian Hall (Charleston, South Carolina)		1840 built 1973 NRHP-listed	105 Meeting St. 32°46′38″N 79°55′54″W	Charleston, South Carolina	Greek Revival architecture and a U.S. National Historic Landmark
