= Anaconda Saddle Club =

- U.S. National Register of Historic Places
- U.S. Historic district
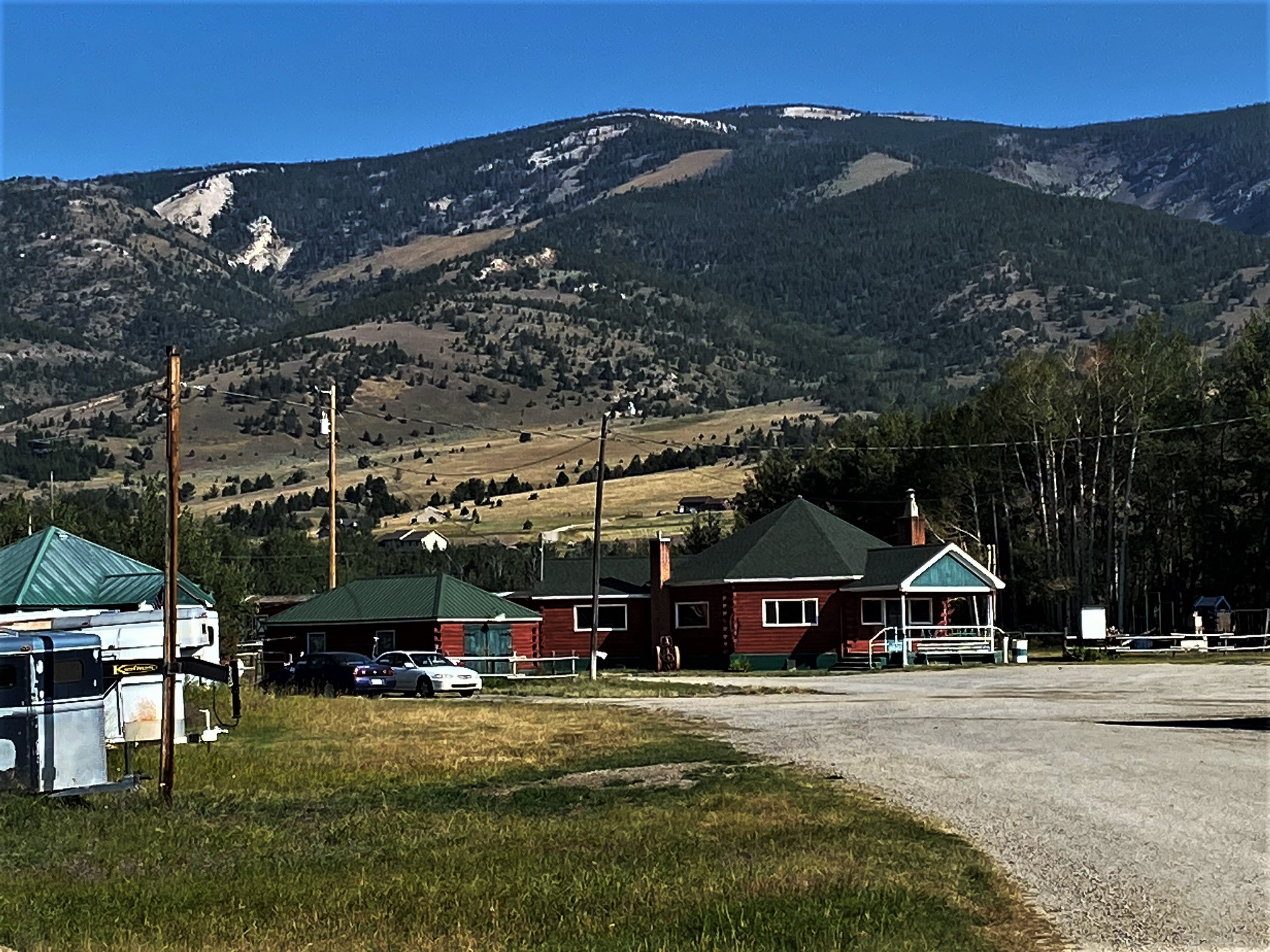

- Location within Montana Location within the United States
- Location: 2704 Montana Highway 1 W., Anaconda, Montana
- Coordinates: 46°09′22″N 113°02′07″W
- Area: 26.4 acres (10.7 ha)
- Built: 1945
- Built by: Martin Nelson, et al.
- Architectural style: Rustic
- MPS: Anaconda MPS
- NRHP reference No.: 06001296
- Added to NRHP: January 24, 2007

The Anaconda Saddle Club, located at 2704 MT 1 W about five miles west of Anaconda, Montana, was built in 1945. It was listed on the National Register of Historic Places in 2007.

It is a historic horse-boarding facility and social center. The listing included 11 contributing buildings and four contributing structures. The clubhouse, "perhaps the most unique building in Anaconda's West Valley", is a one-story octagonal structure, built starting in 1945, made of square-hewn logs resting on a concrete wall foundation.
