= Anaconda Commercial Historic District =

Historic district in Montana, United States

- U.S. National Register of Historic Places
- U.S. Historic district
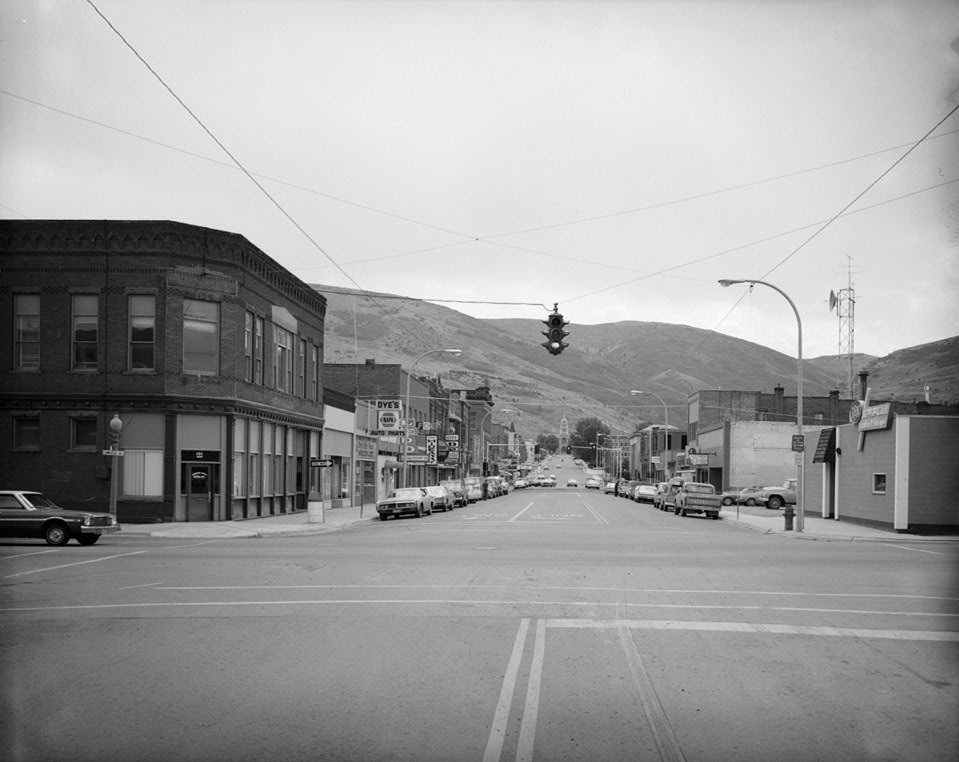
- Main Street in Anaconda, 1979

- Location within Montana Location within the United States
- Location: Roughly bounded by Commercial Avenue, Main Street, Chestnut Street, and East Park Avenue; Anaconda, Montana; United States
- Coordinates: 46°07′46″N 112°56′57″W
- Area: 31 acres (13 ha)
- Built: 1888
- Architect: J.H. Bartlett, et al.
- Architectural style: Late Victorian, Late 19th and Early 20th Century American Movements, Late 19th and 20th Century Revivals
- MPS: Anaconda MPS
- NRHP reference No.: 98000155
- Added to NRHP: February 25, 1998

The Anaconda Commercial Historic District is a historic district in Anaconda, Montana, United States, that is listed on the National Register of Historic Places.

== Description ==
The district covers 31 acres (13 ha) and originally included 63 contributing buildings. It is roughly bounded by Commercial Avenue, Main Street, Chestnut Street, and Eest Park Avenue in Anaconda.

It includes the Anaconda City Hall and the U.S. Post Office-Anaconda Main which are separately listed on the National Register.

It was listed on the National Register of Historic Places in 1998.

== See also ==
- National Register of Historic Places listings in Deer Lodge County, Montana
- Butte–Anaconda Historic District
