= KOPR =

Radio station in Butte, Montana

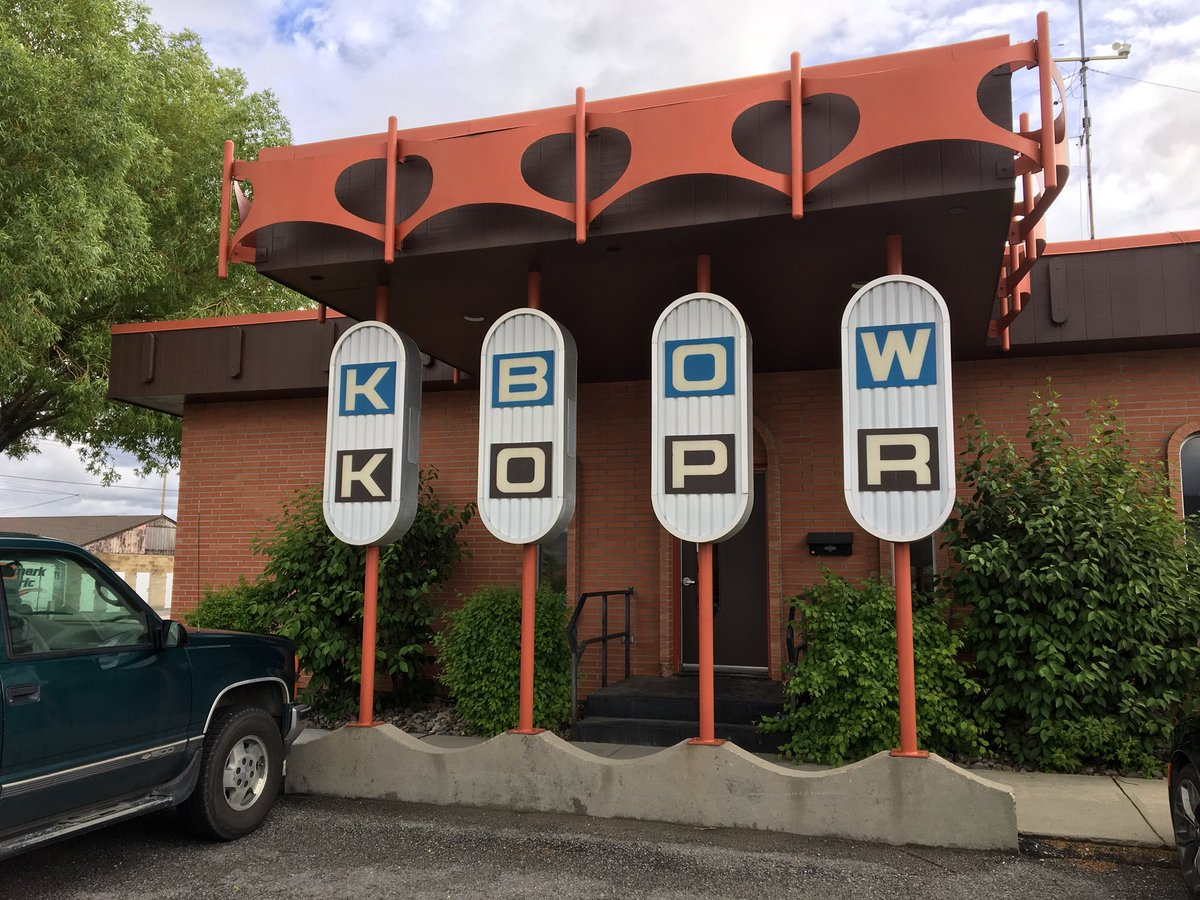
- The KBOW and KOPR studios in Butte
- Butte, Montana; United States
- Broadcast area: Butte-Helena, Montana
- Frequency: 94.1 MHz
- Branding: Kopper 94

Programming
- Format: Adult hits
- Affiliations: ABC News Radio

Ownership
- Owner: Butte Broadcasting, Inc.
- Sister stations: KBOW; KGLM-FM

History
- First air date: October 1, 1972
- Former call signs: KBOW-FM (1972–1978)
- Call sign meaning: "Kopper"

Technical information
- Licensing authority: FCC
- Facility ID: 7912
- Class: C
- ERP: 60,000 watts
- HAAT: 566 meters (1,857 ft)
- Transmitter coordinates: 46.006°N 112.442°W
- Translators: 105.5 K288AW (Philipsburg); 106.7 K294BZ (Boulder)

Links
- Public license information: Public file; LMS
- Webcast: Listen live
- Website: kopr94.net

KOPR (94.1 FM) is an American commercial radio station licensed to serve the community of Butte, Montana.

KOPR airs the syndicated, "Custom Rock Hits" music format from Jones Radio Networks. The station airs an adult hits format branded as "Kopper 94", and is an affiliate for ABC News Radio in the Butte area.

The station first signed on the air on October 1, 1972, originally operating under the call sign KBOW-FM. It served as the FM counterpart to the established KBOW, and the two stations were branded together for several years before the FM frequency adopted its current call letters. The call sign KOPR was chosen as a phonetic nod to the "Copper" mining history of Butte, a city known as the "Richest Hill on Earth."

Longtime owner Richard "Shag" Miller, who had acquired the KOPR name from a defunct AM station in 1964, operated the FM station until his retirement in the 1990s. In April 1994, Miller sold the station to Ron and Shelly Davis, who incorporated as Butte Broadcasting Inc.
