= KBOW =

Radio station in Butte, Montana

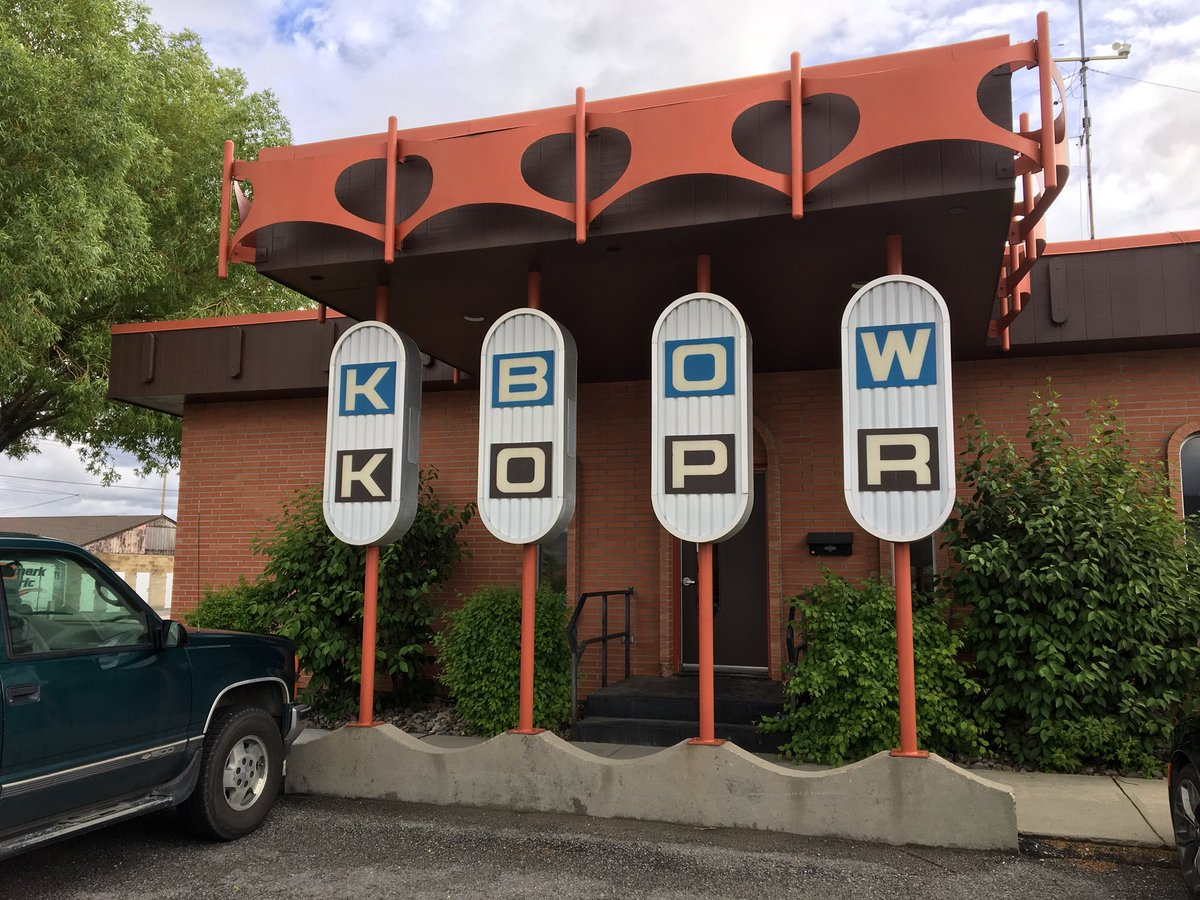
- KBOW and KOPR's studios in Butte
- Butte, Montana; United States
- Frequency: 550 kHz
- Branding: KBOW 550AM 101.5FM

Programming
- Format: Country
- Affiliations: ABC News Radio

Ownership
- Owner: Butte Broadcasting, Inc.
- Sister stations: KGLM-FM; KOPR

History
- First air date: February 14, 1947

Technical information
- Licensing authority: FCC
- Facility ID: 7911
- Class: B
- Power: 5,000 watts (day); 1,000 watts (night)
- Transmitter coordinates: 45°58′12.7″N 112°34′53.1″W
- Translator: 101.5 K268CI (Butte)

Links
- Public license information: Public file; LMS
- Webcast: Listen live
- Website: www.kbow550.net

KBOW (550 AM) is a radio station licensed to serve Butte, Montana. The station is owned by Butte Broadcasting, Inc. It airs a country music format.

The main offices and studios of Butte Broadcasting are at 660 Dewey in Butte. The KBOW transmitter site is southwest of town on Beef Trail Road.

== History ==
KBOW began broadcasting on February 14, 1947, originally operating on the frequency of 1490 kHz. In 1962, the station was purchased by Richard "Shag" Miller, a prominent local figure who spent the next 32 years building the station's reputation as a community hub. Miller acquired the assets of KOPR in 1964, leading to the station's move to 550 kHz.

Under Miller's leadership, KBOW famously scooped national and international media in 1974 by securing the exclusive live broadcast of Evel Knievel’s attempt to jump the Snake River Canyon. The station is also responsible for the "I'm from Butte, America" branding; after Miller ordered an initial run of 5,000 bumper stickers with the slogan, the demand was so overwhelming that it became a permanent symbol of the city's identity.

In 1994, the station was purchased by Ron and Shelly Davis under Butte Broadcasting Inc., continuing its tradition of local ownership. Ron Davis had previously served as the station's program director and assistant general manager before becoming the owner.
