= Hibernia Hall =

- U.S. National Register of Historic Places
- U.S. Historic district – Contributing property
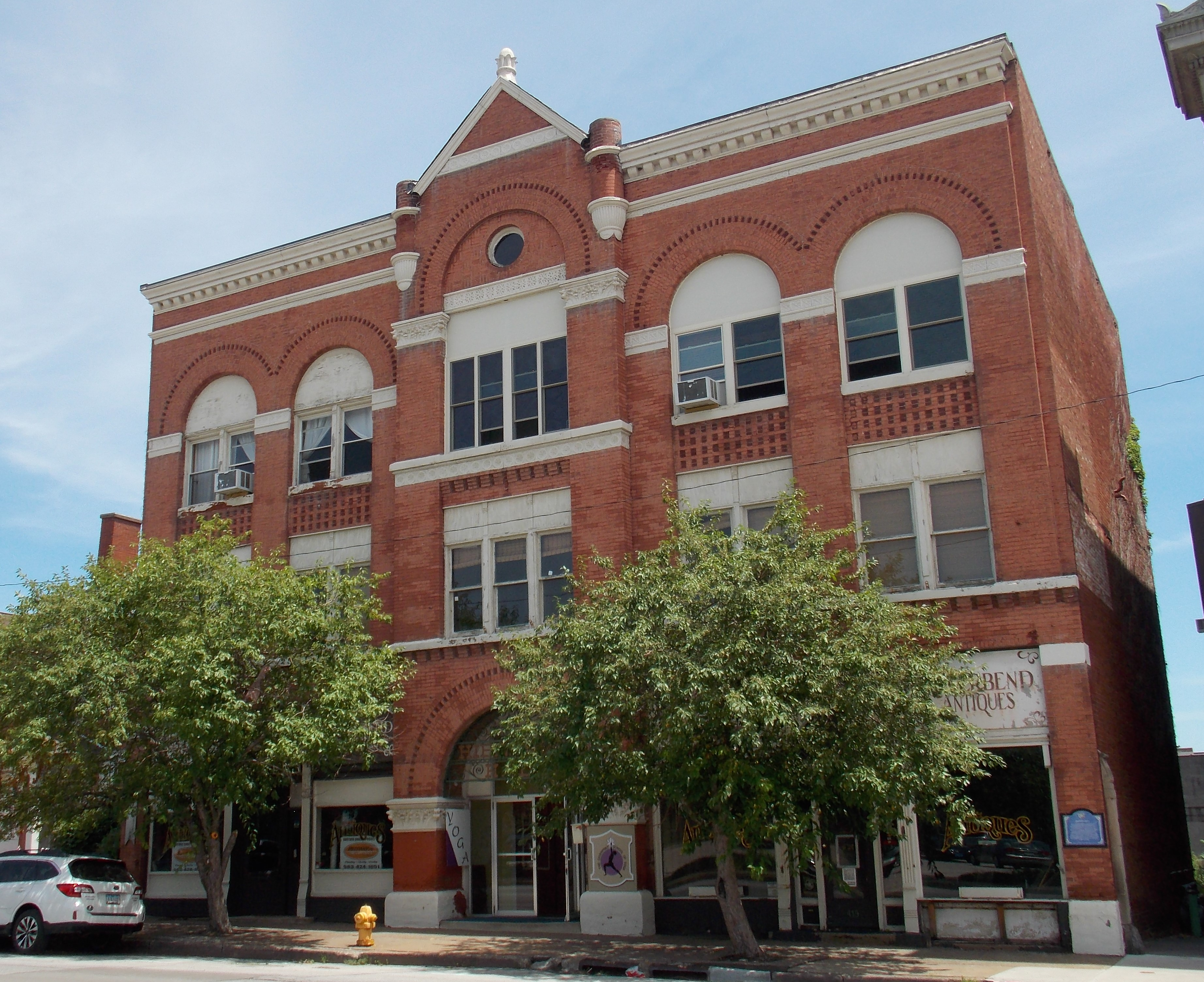
- Hibernian Hall in 2016

- Location within Iowa Location within the United States
- Location: 421 Brady St. Davenport, Iowa
- Coordinates: 41°31′26″N 90°34′25″W
- Area: less than one acre
- Built: 1891
- Built by: Struck & Jaeger
- Architect: Frederick G. Clausen
- Architectural style: Romanesque Revival
- Part of: Davenport Downtown Commercial Historic District (ID100005546)
- MPS: Davenport MRA
- NRHP reference No.: 83002446
- Added to NRHP: July 7, 1983

The Hibernia Hall, also known as the Hibernian Hall, is a Romanesque Revival building located in downtown Davenport, Iowa, United States. It is located on the east side of Brady Street, near the middle of the block. The Hibernian Hall was individually listed on the National Register of Historic Places in 1983.In 2020 it was included as contributing property in the Davenport Downtown Commercial Historic District.

== History ==
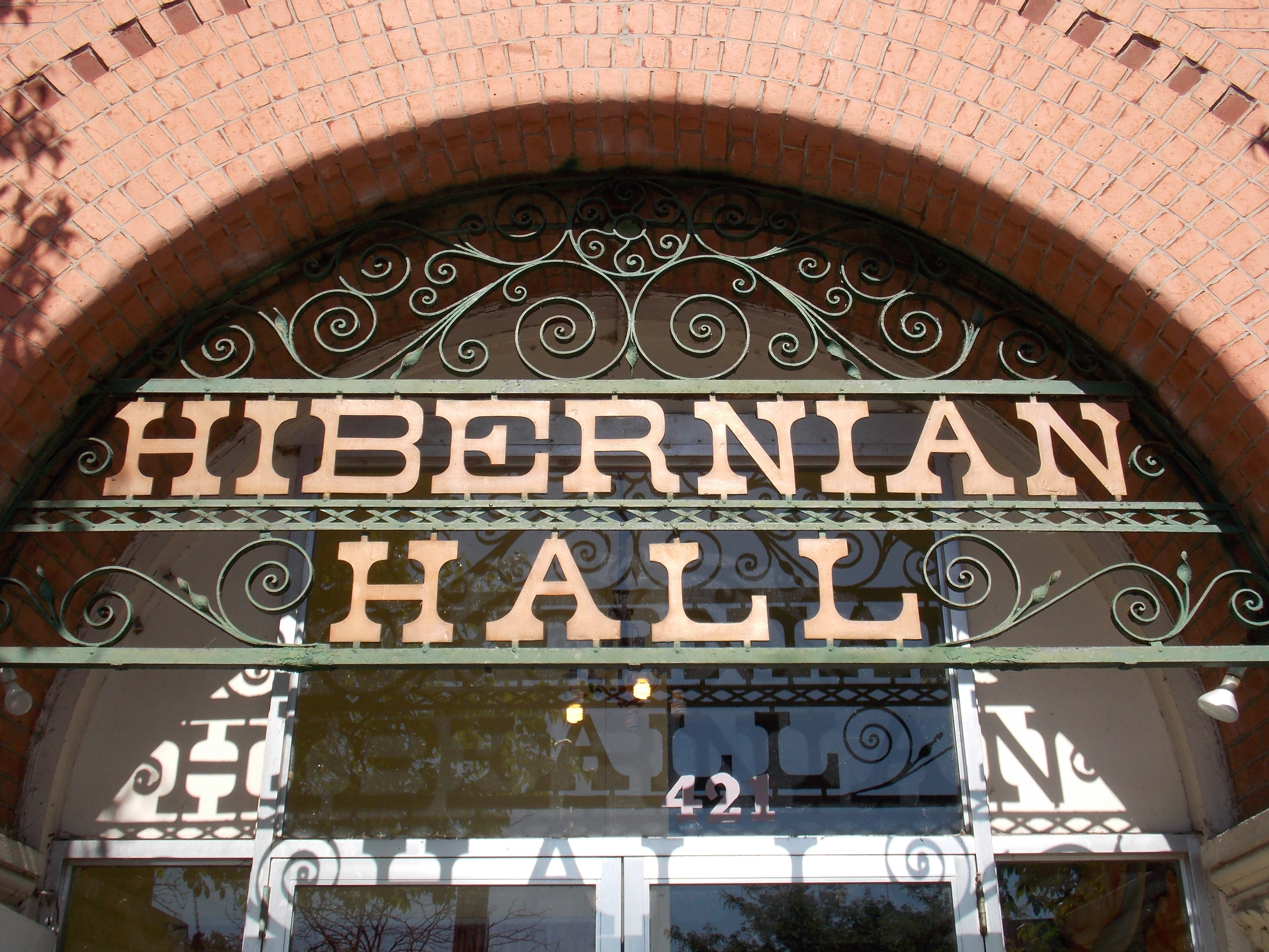
Entrance sign

Irish immigration into the city of Davenport started with the Irish Famines from 1845 to 1849 and religious persecution in Ireland, which was all under British rule at the time. The Irish numbered 1,961 people in Davenport in 1858. They generally, but not exclusively, resided on the east side of town in and around the area known as Cork Hill. For the most part, the Irish immigrants who came to Davenport were laborers who worked in such industries as river men, railroads, telegraph building, and in the areas flour and saw mills.

Like the Germans, Davenport's other large ethnic group, the Irish formed fraternal organizations. The Fenian Society was the first such group to form in 1864. Largely, the group provided their homeland with military, moral, and economic support. Eventually, interest declined and it was replaced in 1881 with the Irish National Land League of America. That organization was replaced three years later with the Ancient Order of Hibernians. In 1885 the Iowa Hibernians held their convention in Davenport.

The Hibernians purchased the property on Brady Street in the late 1880s or early 1890s. An 1886 Sanborn Fire Insurance map shows a Christian Chapel on the site that would become the Hibernia Hall. It was a two-story building with a deep setback from Brady Street. By the 1892 Sanborn map, the same structure was known as Hibernian Hall. The building dates from about 1855. The Hibernians remained active at this location until 1937. The Catholic Messenger, an independent Catholic newspaper that was acquired by the Diocese of Davenport during the Great Depression, operated from here for forty years. The building was converted to retail space on the main level and office space on the upper floors. The structure suffered fire damage in 1951 that resulted in some remodeling.

The building housed Riverbend Antiques from the early 1970s. Its proprietor, Ron Bellomy, owned the building. Bellomy sold the Hibernian Hall in early 2014 to local developers Manoj and Manisha Baheti who plan to turn it and six adjacent buildings into loft apartments.

== Architecture ==
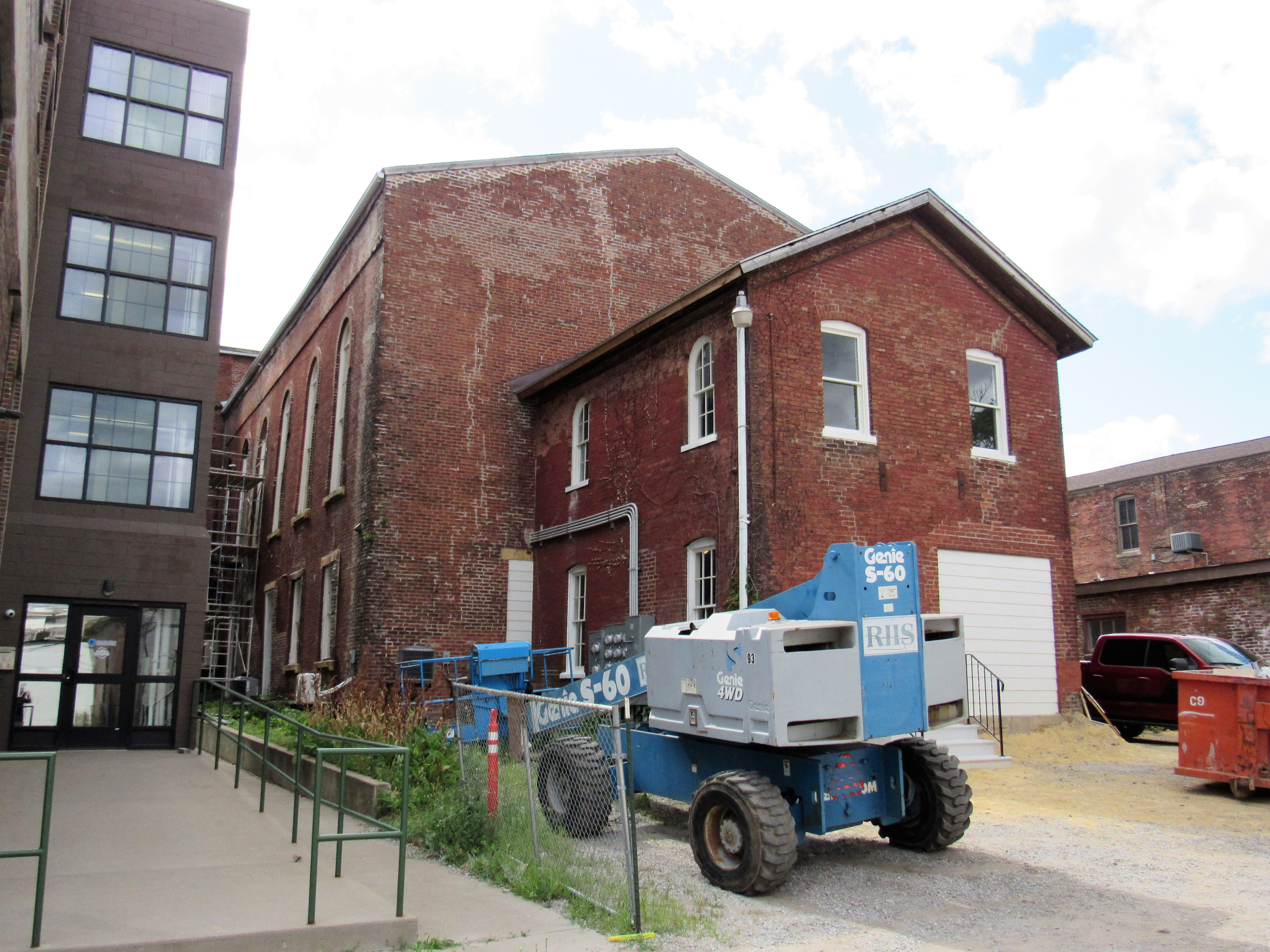
The c. 1855 church.

Davenport architect Frederick G. Clausen designed the front section for the Hibernian's in January 1891. It was built by Struck & Jaeger. The original church sanctuary with a two-story gabled house-style structure attached to it is intact at the rear of the building. The Hibernian Hall is a three-story brick building. The foundation in the front is most likely constructed partially of brick and the original building's foundation in the back is likely stone. The building suggests the Richardsonian Romanesque style found in the vertical grouping of windows within round-arched arcades and the general sense of mass and weight. The building also features wide piers with plinth-like capitals.

The Hibernian Hall is a double-wide storefront with a central projecting pavilion. A gabled parapet and decorative pinnacles top the pavilion. The entrance to the upper floors of the building is found in a turned brick arch in the center pavilion. Above the entrance is an ornate grill that contains the building's name, “Hibernian Hall”.

The oversized windows of the building's upper stories are now reduced in size by infill. The exterior walls between the windows of the second and third story features decorative brickwork. A corbelled cornice is found across the top of the building.

== See also ==
- List of Hibernian buildings
