= Butte–Anaconda Historic District =

Historic district in Montana, United States

Coordinates: 46°00′N 112°36′W

- U.S. National Register of Historic Places
- U.S. National Historic Landmark District
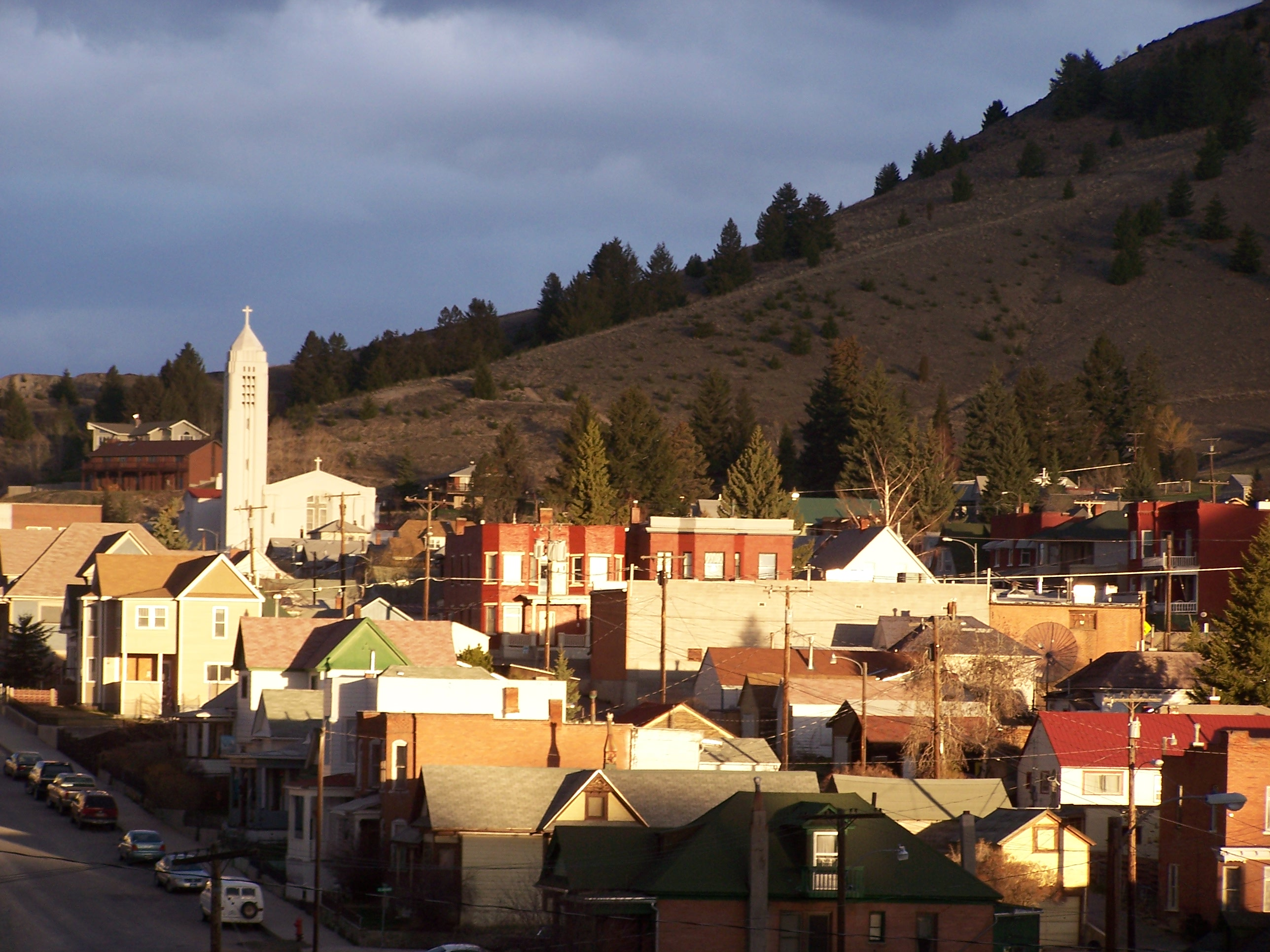

- Location within Montana Location within the United States
- Location: Walkerville, Butte and Anaconda, Montana
- Area: 15.2 square miles (39 km²)
- Built: 1864
- NRHP reference No.: 66000438

Significant dates
- Added to NRHP: October 15, 1966 (original); 2006 (expansion)
- Designated NHLD: July 4, 1961

The Butte–Anaconda Historic District is a National Historic Landmark (NHL) that spans parts of Walkerville, Butte and Anaconda, Montana, United States. It has the most resources of any U.S. National Historic Landmark District.

It was declared an NHL in 1961, when it focused only on Butte.

In 2006, the district was expanded significantly to include parts of Walkerville and Anaconda, as well as the bed of the Butte, Anaconda and Pacific Railroad. The expanded district covers 9,774 acres (39 km^{2}) with nearly 6,000 contributing properties of historic significance.

New York's Adirondack Park and Alaska's Cape Krusenstern Archeological District are much larger by area, but may contain fewer contributing elements.

== Significance ==
The district's national significance relates to its long history of copper production as well as to its role in the development of the labor union movement in the United States. As the source of nearly one-third of all the world's copper in the early 1900s, Butte's mines provided one of the metals that were critical to American industrialization.

Walkerville represents some of the earliest mines in the district and preserves the early mining camp flavor present in the 1890s to 1910s. Butte itself is an urban metropolis where industrial relics such as mine yards and head frames are juxtaposed with a wide variety of residential and business structures. Anaconda was created as a company town that contained the smelters for Butte's ore. The Butte Anaconda and Pacific Railroad, connecting Butte and Anaconda, is a designated part of the expanded National Historic Landmark District.

Known as the "Gibraltar of Unionism", Butte saw the early development of a mine worker's union in 1878. The Butte union's members were at the forefront of creating the Western Federation of Miners as well as the Industrial Workers of the World and later the Congress of Industrial Organizations (CIO). Labor strife in Butte from 1914 to 1920 served as a model for corporate and union activities across the nation. Important factors in this labor history include the murder of Frank Little and the Anaconda Road Massacre. Events in Butte shaped the attitudes of politicians, including Burton K. Wheeler, long-time U.S. senator from Montana.

== See also ==
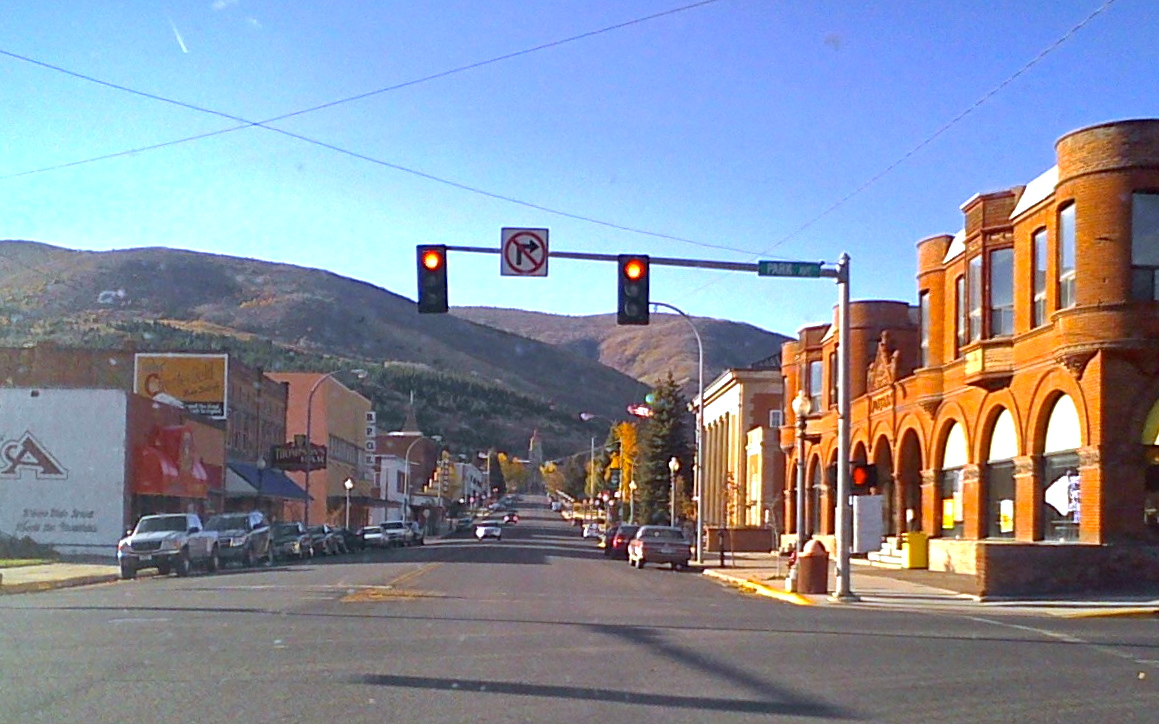
Main Street, Anaconda, Montana

- List of National Historic Landmarks in Montana
- National Register of Historic Places listings in Deer Lodge County, Montana
- Pekin Noodle Parlor
