= Anaconda, Montana =

City in the United States

Anaconda
- Consolidated city-county
- Anaconda-Deer Lodge
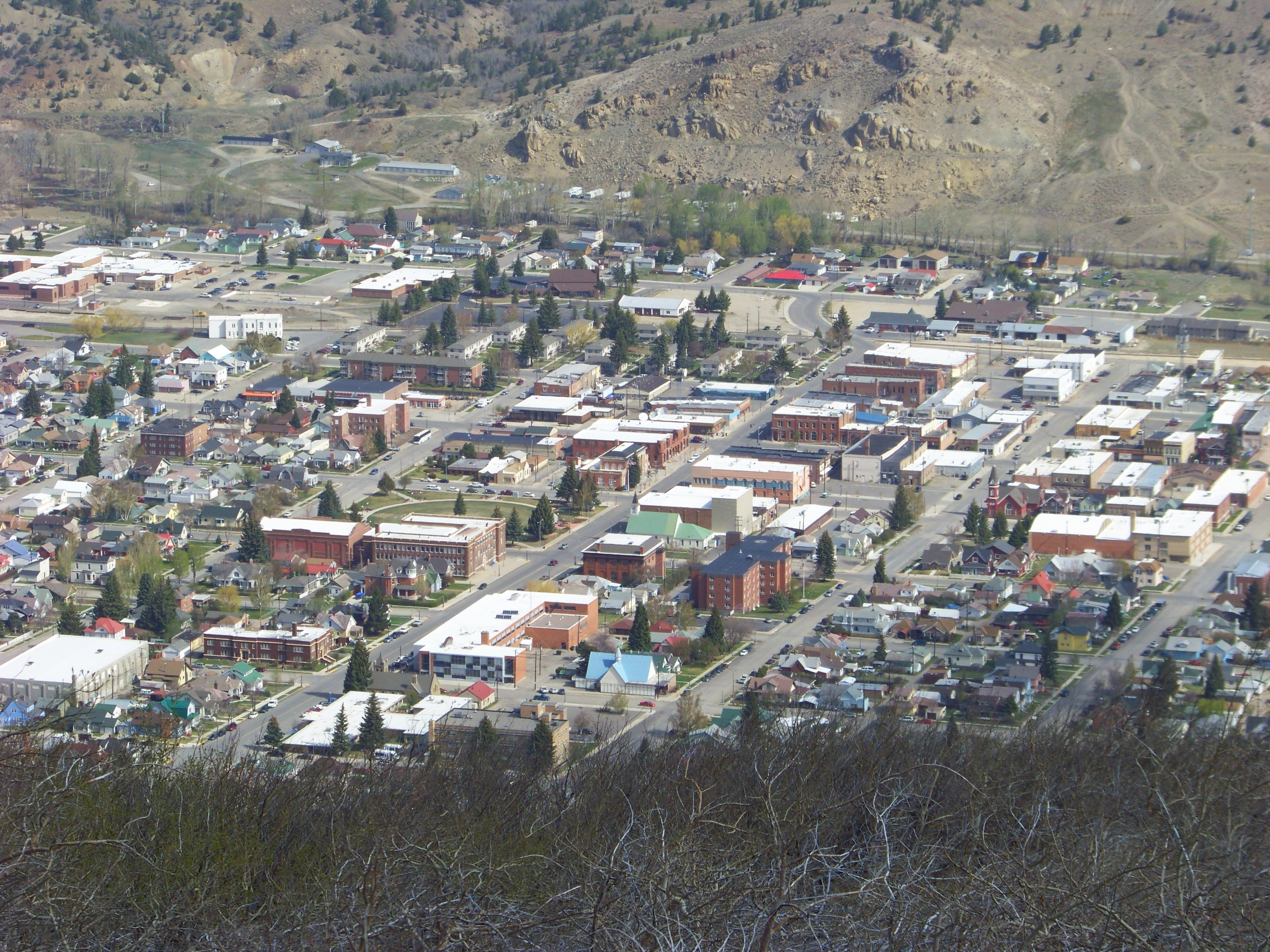
- Downtown Anaconda, looking north

- Flag

- Location of Anaconda within the county Deer Lodge County.

- Location in Montana Anaconda (the United States) Anaconda (North America)
- Coordinates: 46°08′N 112°56′W
- Country: United States
- State: Montana
- County: Deer Lodge

Government
  - Chief Executive Officer: Bill T. Everett

Area
  - Total: 741.2 sq mi (1,919.7 km^{2})
  - Land: 736.5 sq mi (1,907.6 km^{2})
  - Water: 4.7 sq mi (12.1 km^{2})
- Elevation: 5,335 ft (1,626 m)

Population (2020)
  - Total: 9,421
  - Density: 12.8/sq mi (4.94/km^{2})
- Time zone: UTC−7 (Mountain (MST))
  - Summer (DST): UTC−6 (MDT)
- ZIP code: 59711
- FIPS code: 30-01675
- GNIS feature ID: 2409650
- Website: adlc.us

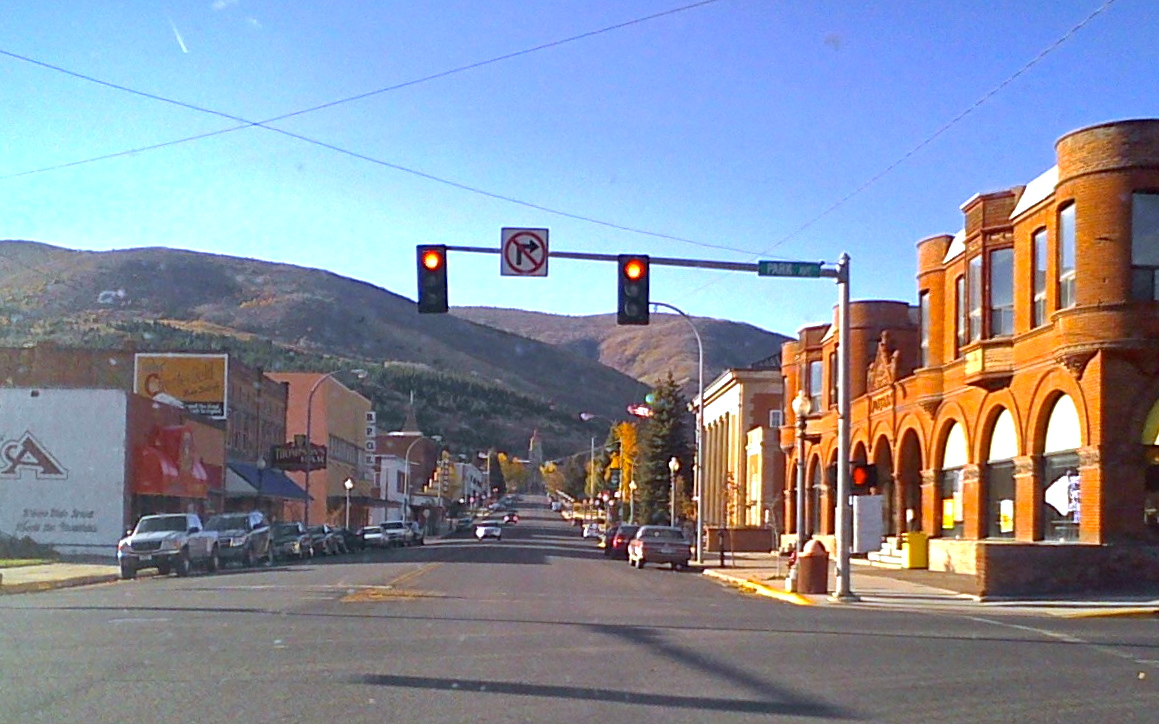
Main Street, Anaconda

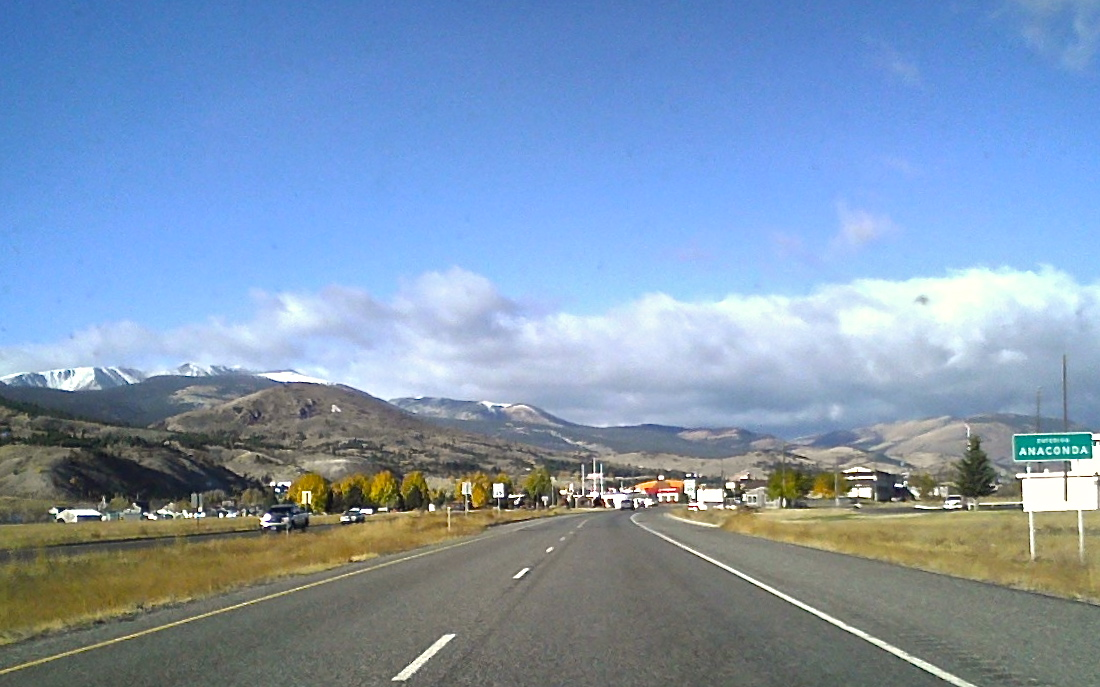
Entering Anaconda, looking west

Anaconda is a city in and the county seat of Deer Lodge County, which has a consolidated city-county government, located in southwestern Montana, United States. Located at the foot of the Anaconda Range, known locally as the "Pintlers", the Continental Divide passes within 8 mi (13 km) south of the community.

In the 2020 census the population of the consolidated city-county was 9,421. As a consolidated city-county area, it ranks as the ninth most populous city in Montana, but as a city alone, is far smaller.

== History ==
Anaconda was founded by Marcus Daly, one of the Copper Kings, who financed the construction of the Anaconda smelter on nearby Warm Springs Creek to process copper ore from the Butte mines. Daly originally named the site "Copperopolis", but that name was already used by Copperopolis, Montana, a small mining town in Meagher County. Instead, Daly accepted the name "Anaconda", and on June 25, 1883, Daly filed for a town plat using that name.

There exists another story that the name was selected by the United States postmaster of the time, Clinton Moore. However, Moore filed the post office application in October 1883, well after the town plat was filed.

When Montana was admitted as a state in 1889, Daly lobbied to have the capital moved to Anaconda, and Montana legislators decided to hold two referendums in 1892 and 1894 to choose a capital city. The campaigns for the referendums were heated, ending with a victory for Helena, the location supported by Daly's rival William A. Clark.

In 1903, the Socialist Party of America won its first victory west of the Mississippi when Anaconda voters elected a socialist mayor, treasurer, police judge, and three councilmen. The Socialist Party had grown within the expanding Montana labor movement. Initially, the Anaconda Copper Mining Company tolerated socialist activities, but when the Socialists gained political power and threatened to implement reform, the company systematically undermined the party. City workers and councilmen refused to cooperate with the new mayor, and the company began to fire Socialists. In the long run, labor lost ground in Anaconda and the company exerted ever greater political control.

The Anaconda Company expanded smelting capacity over time; by 1919 the Washoe Reduction Works could boast that its 585-foot (178 m) smokestack (Anaconda Smelter Stack) was the tallest masonry structure in the world and that the smelter-refining complex constituted the world's largest non-ferrous processing plant.

In 1980, Atlantic Richfield Company closed the smelter, bringing an end to almost a century of mineral processing. While some aspects of the operation had been cleaned up under environmental laws, closing the smelter resulted in a large area contaminated with hazardous wastes. Since then, an operation for environmental cleanup was put into place by the federal Environmental Protection Agency and executed with the assistance of ARCO. The multimillion-dollar cleanup and redevelopment has resulted in the "Old Works" Golf Course, a championship 18-hole course designed by Jack Nicklaus.

Anaconda joined with Deer Lodge County to form a consolidated city-county government in 1977. Part of Anaconda is included in the Butte-Anaconda Historic District.

On August 1, 2025, the Owl Bar in Anaconda was the scene of a mass shooting that killed four people. The suspect escaped the scene, sparking a multi-day manhunt, before he was apprehended seven days later.

== Geography ==
Central Anaconda is 5,335 ft (1,626 m) above sea level, and is surrounded by the communities of Opportunity and West Valley.

The county area is 736.53 square miles (1,907.6 km^{2}), characterized by densely timbered forestlands, lakes, mountains and recreation grounds. The county has common borders with Beaverhead, Butte-Silver Bow, Granite, Jefferson and Powell counties.

=== Climate ===
According to the Köppen climate classification, Anaconda has a humid continental climate.

- Average annual rainfall: 15 inches or 380 millimetres
- Average length of growing season: 114 days
- Average annual snowfall: 75.2 inches or 1.9 metres
- Average annual temperature: 43.8 °F (6.6 °C)

Climate data for Anaconda, Montana (1991–2020 normals, extremes 1901–1927, 1982–present)
Month	Jan	Feb	Mar	Apr	May	Jun	Jul	Aug	Sep	Oct	Nov	Dec	Year
Record high °F (°C)	60 (16)	65 (18)	71 (22)	83 (28)	91 (33)	96 (36)	100 (38)	102 (39)	97 (36)	88 (31)	74 (23)	60 (16)	102 (39)
Mean daily maximum °F (°C)	36.6 (2.6)	39.3 (4.1)	47.5 (8.6)	54.7 (12.6)	64.1 (17.8)	72.5 (22.5)	82.7 (28.2)	81.5 (27.5)	72.2 (22.3)	57.1 (13.9)	43.4 (6.3)	34.4 (1.3)	57.2 (14.0)
Daily mean °F (°C)	26.3 (−3.2)	27.8 (−2.3)	35.2 (1.8)	41.5 (5.3)	50.2 (10.1)	57.8 (14.3)	65.7 (18.7)	64.4 (18.0)	55.9 (13.3)	43.8 (6.6)	32.4 (0.2)	24.6 (−4.1)	43.8 (6.6)
Mean daily minimum °F (°C)	15.9 (−8.9)	16.4 (−8.7)	22.9 (−5.1)	28.4 (−2.0)	36.4 (2.4)	43.0 (6.1)	48.7 (9.3)	47.3 (8.5)	39.7 (4.3)	30.5 (−0.8)	21.3 (−5.9)	14.7 (−9.6)	30.4 (−0.9)
Record low °F (°C)	−37 (−38)	−35 (−37)	−21 (−29)	−2 (−19)	14 (−10)	23 (−5)	30 (−1)	23 (−5)	11 (−12)	−9 (−23)	−22 (−30)	−38 (−39)	−38 (−39)
Average precipitation inches (mm)	0.57 (14)	0.99 (25)	1.15 (29)	1.50 (38)	2.13 (54)	2.21 (56)	1.30 (33)	1.20 (30)	1.15 (29)	1.00 (25)	0.97 (25)	0.72 (18)	14.89 (378)
Average snowfall inches (cm)	11.4 (29)	11.3 (29)	11.8 (30)	9.9 (25)	2.0 (5.1)	0.6 (1.5)	0.0 (0.0)	0.2 (0.51)	0.4 (1.0)	3.3 (8.4)	12.1 (31)	12.1 (31)	75.1 (191)
Average precipitation days (≥ 0.01 in)	9.2	8.5	11.2	12.1	13.8	13.8	9.3	9.1	7.9	10.1	10.5	9.9	125.4
Average snowy days (≥ 0.1 in)	7.8	7.7	6.8	4.9	1.3	0.5	0.0	0.0	0.3	3.2	6.8	8.4	47.7
Source: NOAA

== Demographics ==
Historical population
Census	Pop.	Note	%±
1880	700		—
1890	3,975		467.9%
1900	9,453		137.8%
1910	10,134		7.2%
1920	11,668		15.1%
1930	12,494		7.1%
1940	11,004		−11.9%
1950	11,254		2.3%
1960	12,054		7.1%
1970	9,771		−18.9%
1980	12,518		28.1%
1990	10,278		−17.9%
2000	9,417		−8.4%
2010	9,298		−1.3%
2020	9,421		1.3%
Source; U.S. Decennial Census

For Anaconda, US Census Bureaus's 2015-2019 American Community Survey showed a median household income of $41,820. Anaconda had earlier peaks of population in 1930 and 1980, based on the mining industry.

== Arts and culture ==
On main street is the Washoe Theater, which is listed on the National Register of Historic Places. It was the last theater constructed in the United States in the Nuevo Deco style. The theater was designed in 1930 by B. Marcus Priteca, an architect from Seattle and opened in 1936. It was listed by the NRHP for architectural significance in 1982. It currently is used for showing films, plus periodically hosting plays and other types of entertainment.

== Government and politics ==
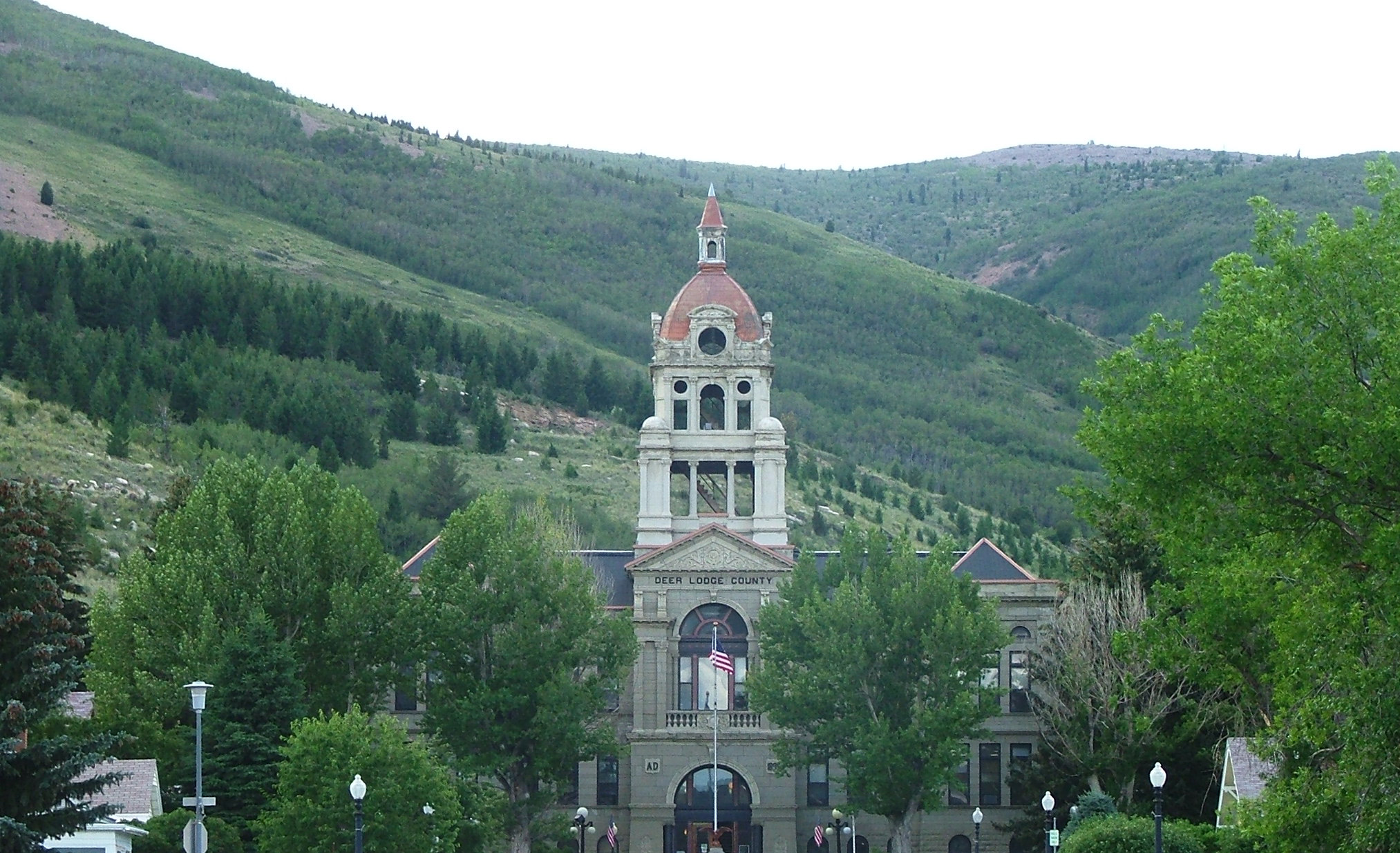
The Deer Lodge County Courthouse in Anaconda

Deer Lodge County voters have a record as the most consistently Democratic county in Montana for Presidential elections. These voters have not supported a Republican candidate since Calvin Coolidge in 1924. In the last five elections before 2016, the Democratic candidate has won by 21% to nearly 49% of Deer Lodge County's vote. In gubernatorial elections, the only Republican to carry the county in the last twenty years was Marc Racicot in the 1996 election. In that election the original Democratic nominee, Chet Blaylock, died and Marc Racicot carried every county.

The city is currently in the 36th and 39th districts of the Montana Senate and is represented by Democrat Sara Novak and Republican Terry Vermeire in the 2025 legislative session respectively. Anaconda is also in the 71st and 77th districts of the Montana House of Representatives, which has been represented by Democrat Scott DeMarois and Republican John Fitzpatrick since 2023 and 2025 respectively. This is the first time since 1945 that the city has been represented by a Republican in the state House of Representatives.

Elected in 2017, Bill Everett is the current CEO. The CEO is elected by a plurality vote on a non-partisan ballot for a four-year term.

== Sports and recreation ==
- Hunting – There are hundreds of square miles of hunting available to the public in the area. With permit, hunting is permitted for fowl, bear, mountain lion, elk, deer and moose.
- Fishing – Many nearby mountain lakes and streams offer such primary fishing spots as Silver Lake, Georgetown Lake, Echo Lake, Storm Lake, Racetrack Lake, Warm Springs Creek, Warm Springs Ponds, and the Big Hole River.
- Golf – The Old Works Golf Course is a Jack Nicklaus-signature golf course, developed of brownfield land. A local country club and an 18-hole championship golf course are located at Fairmont Hot Springs.
- Skiing – The area has many trails for cross-country skiers, and the nearby Discovery Ski Area has downhill skiing with 15 downhill double-black diamond trails and 5 kilometres (3 mi) of groomed cross-country ski trails.
- Darts -The annual Winter Getaway dart tournament, held in several local establishments, is the largest regional dart tournament in Montana.
- Museums – The Copper Village Museum and Arts Center provides visitors and residents with art and history of the local area.
- Hiking – Hiking opportunities in and around Anaconda include trails up to mountain lakes and a 10,067-foot (3,068 m) mountain that can be climbed without technical equipment. A walking trail is on the north side of Anaconda next to Warm Springs Creek.
- Drag Racing – Lost Creek Raceway was founded in 1986 and hosts over 20 events a year bringing racers from Washington, Idaho and Montana.
- Mountain Biking

== Education ==
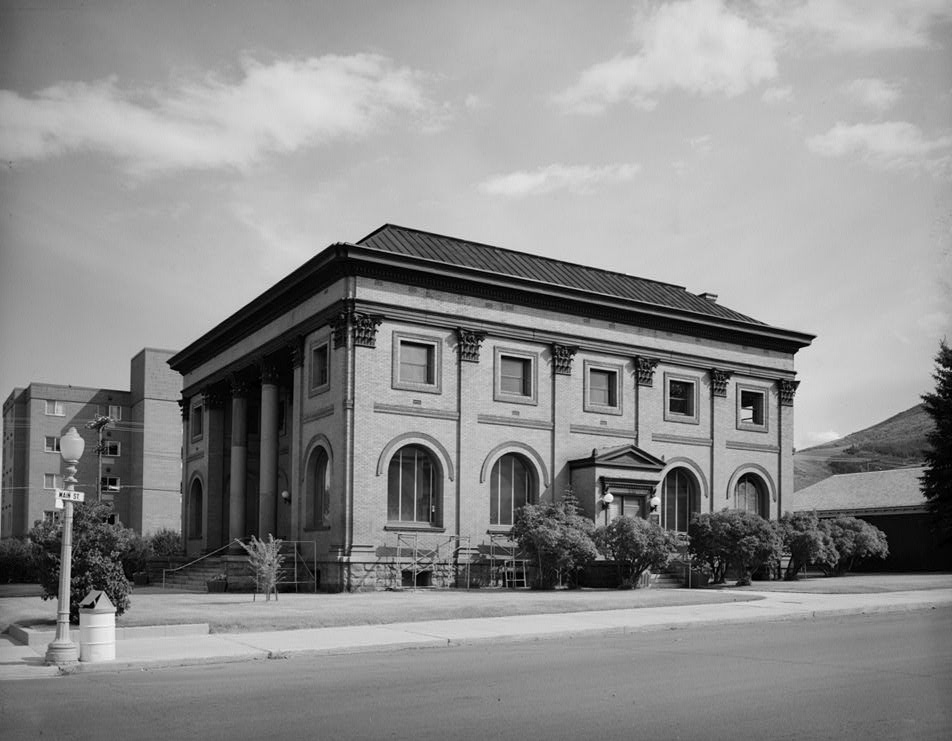
Hearst Free Library (1898), listed on the National Register of Historic Places

Four schools are part of Anaconda School District 10, including a Head Start program; Lincoln Elementary (grades K-3), Fred Moodry Intermediate School (grades 4–6), and Anaconda Junior-Senior High School (grades 7–12). The mascot of Anaconda Junior-Senior High School is the Copperheads.

The Hearst Free Library serves the area.

== Infrastructure ==
Anaconda is on Montana Highway 1 off of Interstate 90. The Highway extends to Drummond and is known as the Pintler Scenic Loop. East of town is the Montana Highway 48 junction.

Bowman Field is a public airport located three miles (5 km) northeast of Anaconda. The nearest commercial airport is Bert Mooney Airport in Butte.

The Community Hospital of Anaconda provides medical care to the town.

== Media ==
The Anaconda Leader is the local newspaper. It is published twice weekly.

KGLM-FM is licensed in Anaconda. It is owned by Butte Broadcasting Inc.

== Film credits ==
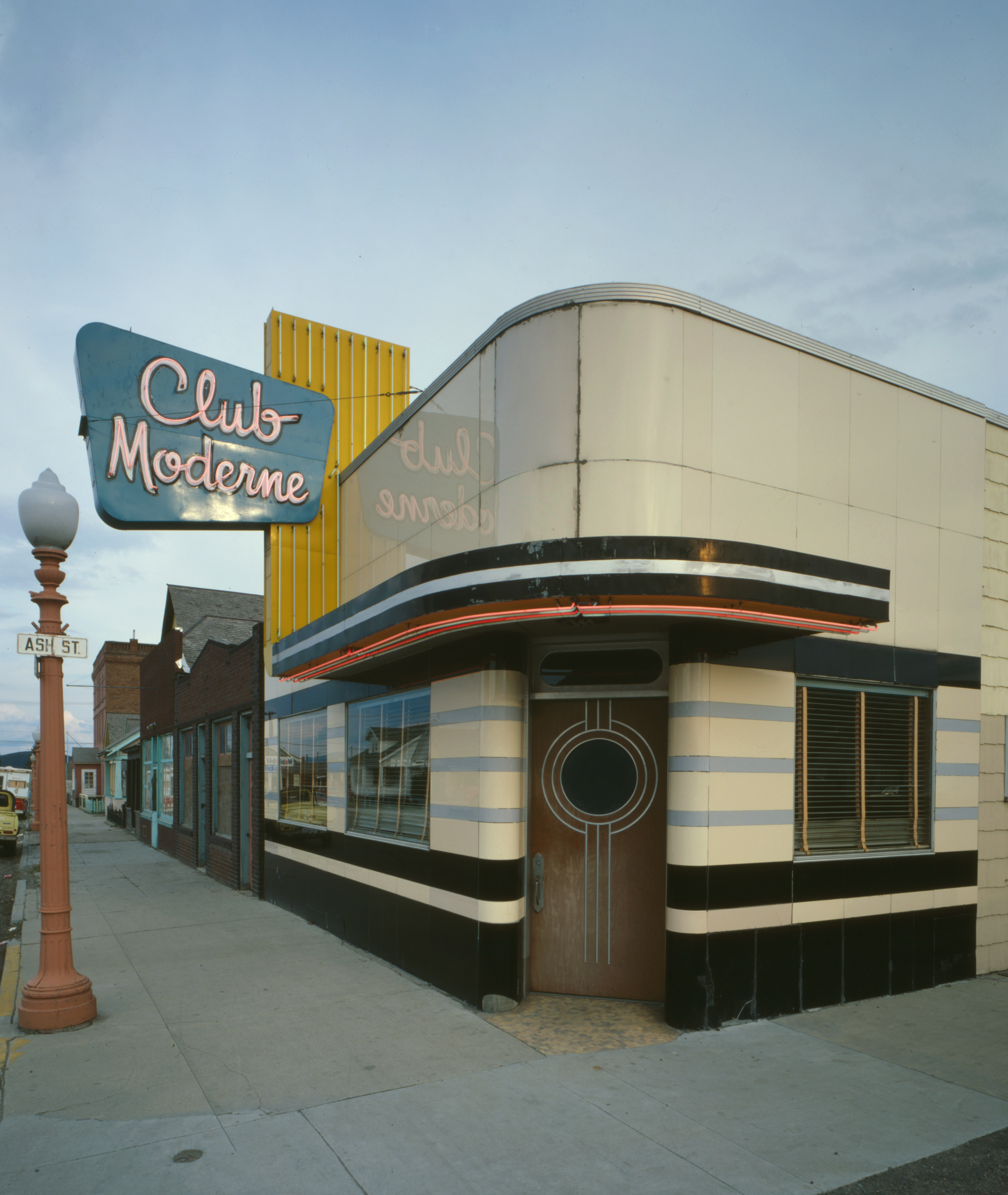
Club Moderne (1937), Anaconda (Historic American Buildings Survey)

Anaconda has been a filming location for several movies, documentaries, and a TV show, including:

- 1960 - Perch of The Devil, Harvey Richards Media Archive (Estuary Press)
- 1974 - The Legendary Mountain, Montana State University Film and T.V. Center
- 1978 - The Other Side of Hell, Aubrey-Lyon Productions
- 1981 - Today, NBC News Production
- 1985 - Runaway Train, Golan-Globus Productions
- 1986 - Better Pictures, Left Handed Pictures
- 1987 - Portrait Of America, Turner Broadcasting System
- 1992 - Return to Better Pictures, Sloppy Films
- 1993 - Return to Lonesome Dove, Artisan Home Entertainment
- 2005 - Backroads of Montana, Montana PBS
- 2008 - Prodigal Sons, Big Sky Productions
- 2012 - Diggers, Half Yard Productions
- 2016 - Dead 7, Syfy
- 2016 - Lester Leaps In, Montana Mafia Productions
- 2018 - Jeremy Bass: We Will Be You, Annie McCain Casting
- 2018 - Far Cry 5: Inside Eden's Gate, Asylum Entertainment
- 2019 - Worth The Wait, Maney Telefilm Co.
- 2019 - Mickey and the Bear, Utopia
- 2020 - Trail of Justice, Eagle Ridge Studios
- 2020 - Two Eyes, Two Eyes Productions
- 2020 - Backroads of Montana, Montana PBS
- 2022 - The Ghost Town Terror, Travel Channel
- 2022 - Father Stu, Sony Pictures Releasing
- 2022 - 1923, MTV Entertainment Studios
- 2024 - Ghosts of Gold Creek, TBA
- 2025 - Broke, Sony Pictures Home Entertainment
- 2025 - Buffalo Daze, 3 Buffalo Girls Productions
- 2026 - Baby Love, Upper State
- TBA - Brown, Dark Frames
- TBA - Hunter Grail, Moai Films, Screenland Productions
- TBA - Showdown at the Fallstaff Saloon, Montana 48 Hour Film Project

== Notable people ==
- Lucille Ball – actress; lived in Anaconda briefly as a child; she was born in Jamestown, New York.
- John H. Collins – classical scholar
- Frank Cope – New York Giants offensive lineman
- Joseph Paul Cretzer - Bank Robber & Alcatraz Inmate
- Marcus Daly – founder of Anaconda, and one of the "Copper Kings" of Butte
- Lester Dragstedt – first surgeon to successfully separate conjoined twins
- Wayne Estes – college basketball star
- Bert Glennon – cinematographer and director
- Raymond Hunthausen – Roman Catholic Archbishop of Seattle
- Rob Johnson – former Major League Baseball catcher
- Ed Kalafat – NBA Minneapolis Lakers basketball player
- Nancy Keenan – politician, NARAL president
- Hal C. Kern – film editor
- Angela McLean – Lieutenant Governor of Montana
- Jesse Laslovich – Montana Attorney & US District Attorney for District of Montana
- Milan Lazetich – football player for Los Angeles Rams
- George A. Lingo – politician in the Alaska Territory
- Jack Morris, S.J. – born in Anaconda, founded and named the Jesuit Volunteer Corps.
- Bill Ray – Alaska businessman, politician, writer
- Roger Rouse – Professional Boxer
- Michael Sells – Islamic studies expert
- Bridget Sullivan – Lizzie Borden's maid. Lived in Anaconda for the rest of her life until her death.
- George Leo Thomas – First Roman Catholic Archbishop of Las Vegas.
- Ralph "Papa" Thorson – bounty hunter, subject of The Hunter starring Steve McQueen
- Lester Thurow – economist
- John H. Tolan – U.S. Congressman from California
- Gene Vuckovich – Montana Senate of 39th District
- Thomas J. Ward – Medal of Honor recipient in the Civil War

== See also ==
- Atlantic Cable Quartz Lode
