= List of copper mines in the United States =

Mines producing copper in the US in 2003. (Alaska and Hawaii produced no copper in 2003.) Source: USGS

The following is a list of copper mines in the United States.

== Leading copper-producing mines ==
Leading copper-producing mines in the U.S., 2018–2021, in order of output: The mines on this list account for more than 99% of U.S. mine copper production.

Rank	Mine	County and State	Owner	Source of copper	Annual production (thousand tonnes)
1	Morenci	Greenlee County, Arizona; 33°05′26″N 109°22′00″W	Freeport-McMoRan (72%), Sumitomo Group (28%)	Open pit, copper-molybdenum ore, producing copper cathode, copper and molybdenum concentrates	286 (2021)
2	Bingham Canyon	Salt Lake County, Utah; 40°31′23″N 112°09′04″W	Rio Tinto	Open pit copper-molybdenum ore, producing copper cathode, molybdenum concentrate, gold, silver, sulfuric acid	202 (2021)
3	Safford	Graham County, Arizona; 32°56′50″N 109°39′03″W	Freeport-McMoRan	Copper ore, leached	120 (2021)
4	Sierrita	Pima County, Arizona; 31°52′26″N 111°08′02″W	Freeport-McMoRan	Copper-molybdenum ore, concentrated and leached	86 (2021)
5	Bagdad	Yavapai County, Arizona; 34°35′05″N 113°12′43″W	Freeport-McMoRan	Copper-molybdenum ore, concentrated and leached	83 (2021)
6	El Chino	Grant County, New Mexico; 32°47′30″N 108°04′02″W	Freeport-McMoRan	Copper-molybdenum ore, concentrated and leached	56 (2021)
7	Pinto Valley	Gila County, Arizona; 33°25′55″N 110°57′27″W	Capstone Mining Corp.	Copper-molybdenum ore, concentrated and leached	54 (2020)
8	Ray	Pinal County, Arizona; 33°08′58″N 110°59′14″W	Grupo México	Copper ore, concentrated and leached	56 (2018)
9	Robinson	White Pine County, Nevada; 39°15′33″N 114°58′24″W	KGHM Polska Miedź	Copper-gold-molybdenum ore, open pit, concentrate products	56 (2021)
10	Mission Complex	Pima County, Arizona	Grupo México	Copper-molybdenum ore, concentrated	44 (2018)
11	Continental Pit	Silver Bow County, Montana	Montana Resources LLP	Copper-molybdenum ore, concentrated	33 (2015)
12	Tyrone	Grant County, New Mexico	Freeport-McMoRan	Copper ore, leached	55 (2021)
13	Silver Bell	Pima County, Arizona	Grupo México	Copper ore, leached	19 (2018)
14	Eagle Mine	Marquette County, Michigan; 46°44′47″N 87°52′50″W	Lundin Mining	Underground mine producing nickel and copper concentrates	18 (2018)
15	Phoenix	Lander County, Nevada	Nevada Gold Mines	Gold-copper ore, concentrated and leached	17 (2021)
16	Lisbon Valley	San Juan County, Utah	Lisbon Valley Mining Company	Copper ore, open pit, heap leached	10–15 (2018)
17	Miami	Gila County, Arizona	Freeport-McMoRan	Copper ore, leached	5 (2021)
18	Carlota	Gila County, Arizona	KGHM Polska Miedź	Porphyry copper open pit, producing copper cathode	3.2 (2018)
19	Pumpkin Hollow (see Anaconda)	Lyon County, Nevada	Nevada Copper	IOCG skarn, underground, producing copper concentrate	(2019)

== Copper-mining projects not yet in production ==
Mine	County (Borough) and State	Operator	Type of Deposit	Status
Pebble	Lake and Peninsula Borough, Alaska; 59°53′50″N 155°17′43″W	Northern Dynasty Minerals	Porphyry copper-gold-molybdenum	Pre-feasibility
Rosemont	Pima County, Arizona; 31°51′05″N 110°45′26″W	Hudbay	Porphyry skarn	Permitting
Resolution	Pinal County, Arizona; 33°18′11″N 111°06′00″W	Rio Tinto 55%, BHP 45%	Porphyry copper deposit beneath the inactive Magma Mine	Permitted
Back Forty Mine	Menominee County, Michigan	Gold Resource Corp.	Volcanogenic massive sulfide	
Northmet	St. Louis County, Minnesota	Polymet Mining	Copper-nickel-PGM deposit in disseminated and massive sulfides in layered mafic intrusion	All state and federal permits issued for an open pit mine
Black Butte	Meagher County, Montana	Sandfire Resources America	SEDEX copper-cobalt-silver	Permitting
Florence	Florence, Arizona	Taseko	In situ leach field	Under Construction

== Inactive or defunct copper mines ==
There are hundreds of inactive or defunct copper mines in the United States. The list below includes only those with Wikipedia articles.

Mine	County and State	Operator	Type of Deposit	Status
New Cornelia	Ajo, Pima County, Arizona	Phelps Dodge	Porphyry copper	Inactive since 1983
Copper Queen	Bisbee, Cochise County, Arizona	Phelps Dodge	Manto (replacement) in limestone	Mining stopped in 1975; now open for tours
Lavender Pit	Bisbee, Cochise County, Arizona	Phelps Dodge	Porphyry copper	Closed in 1974
United Verde Mine	Jerome, Yavapai County, Arizona	Phelps Dodge		Closed in 1953
Iron Mountain	Shasta County, California		Volcanogenic massive sulfide	Operated 1860s to 1963; now a superfund site
Minesota	Ontonagon County, Michigan		Native copper	Mined from 1848 to 1870
Nonesuch	Ontonagon County, Michigan		Native copper	Closed since 1912
Quincy	Hancock, Houghton County, Michigan	Quincy Mining Co.	Strataform native copper	Closed since 1945. Now part of Keweenaw National Historical Park
Cliff	Keweenaw County, Michigan	Pittsburgh & Boston Mining Co.	Vein native copper	Productive 1845 to 1887
Victoria Mine	Victoria, Ontonagon County, Michigan	Victoria Copper Mining Company		Closed in 1921
C&H	Calumet, Houghton County, Michigan	C&H Mining Co.	Native Copper	Closed in the late 1960s
Anaconda	Butte, Silver Bow County, Montana	Anaconda Copper		Closed since 1947
Berkeley Pit	Butte, Silver Bow County, Montana	Anaconda Copper	Porphyry copper	Closed in 1982; now a superfund site and tourist attraction
Troy Mine	Troy, Lincoln County, Montana	Revett Minerals, Hecla Mining		Closed 2015; active between 1981 and 1983, and 2005–2015
Yerington - Anaconda	Lyon County, Nevada	Anaconda Copper		Closed since 1978
Pahaquarry	Warren County, New Jersey			Closed since 1928
Schuyler	Bergen County, New Jersey			Closed since 1901
Burra Burra	Ducktown, Polk County, Tennessee	Tennessee Chemical Company	Volcanogenic massive sulfide	Closed in 1987; now part of a state-owned historical site
Elizabeth	Orange County, Vermont		Volcanogenic massive sulfide	Open 1809–1957; now a federal superfund site
Tubal Cain	Washington	Tubal-Cain Copper & Manganese Mining Co.		Operated 1902–1906
Flambeau Mine	Ladysmith, Wisconsin	Kennecott Minerals	Copper, gold, and silver	Operated 1993-1997

== See also ==
- Copper mining
- Copper mining in the United States
