= Bull Lake, Montana =

- Census-designated place
- Location within Montana Location within the United States
- Coordinates: 48°14′50″N 115°50′33″W
- Country: United States
- State: Montana
- County: Lincoln

Area
  - Total: 3.10 sq mi (8.02 km^{2})
  - Land: 1.81 sq mi (4.69 km^{2})
  - Water: 1.29 sq mi (3.33 km^{2})
- Elevation: 2,330 ft (710 m)

Population (2020)
  - Total: 180
  - Density: 99.4/sq mi (38.36/km^{2})
- Time zone: UTC-7 (Mountain (MST))
  - Summer (DST): UTC-6 (MDT)
- ZIP Code: 59935 (Troy)
- Area code: 406
- FIPS code: 30-10935
- GNIS feature ID: 2806637

Bull Lake is an unincorporated community and census-designated place (CDP) in Lincoln County, Montana, United States. As of the 2020 census, Bull Lake had a population of 180. It is in the southwestern part of the county, surrounding the lake of the same name. Montana Highway 56 runs along the east side of the lake, leading north 18 miles (29 km) to Troy in the Kootenay River valley and south 19 miles (31 km) to Montana Highway 200 in the Clark Fork valley.

Bull Lake was first listed as a CDP prior to the 2020 census.

== Demographics ==
Historical population
Census	Pop.	Note	%±
2020	180		—
U.S. Decennial Census
