= Indian Valley Railroad =

Railroad in California, United States

Overview
- Headquarters: Greenville, California
- Locale: Plumas County, California
- Dates of operation: 1917–1938

Technical
- Track gauge: 4 ft 8 1/2 in (1,435 mm) standard gauge

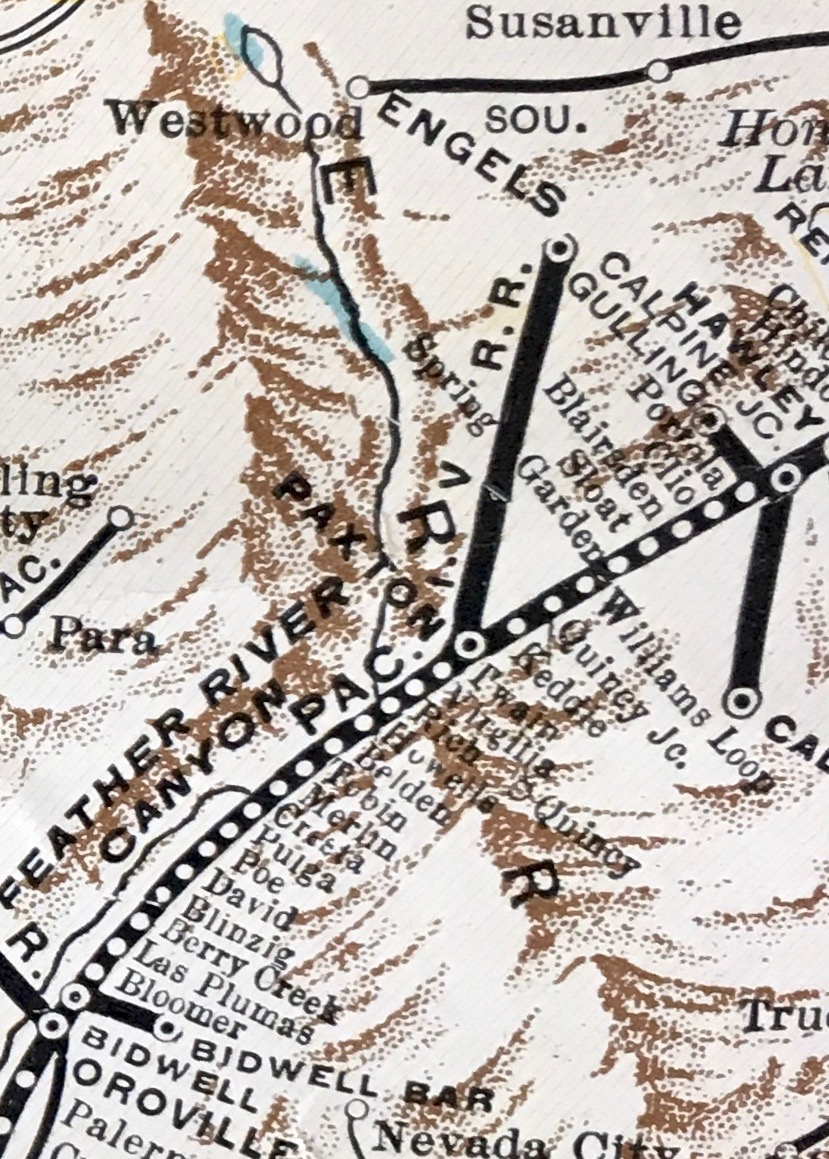
Route in 1931

The Indian Valley (IV) Railroad was a shortline railroad that was constructed from the Engels Copper Mine to a connection with the Western Pacific Railroad at Paxton, in Plumas County, northeastern California.

== Construction ==
The Western Pacific line was completed through the Feather River Canyon in 1909. The IV was incorporated on June 30, 1916 and grading commenced a month later. The laying of 56 and 65 pound rails commenced in November 1916. On September 1, 1917 the 21.6 mile line was completed at a cost of $746,483.

== Mining ==
The IV was constructed during a copper boom that ran from 1915-1930 in the area. At the north end of the Plumas Copper Belt was the Engels mine. The Engels mine was named after Henry A. Engels, who settled the area in the 1880s and began to mine copper. In 1901, the Engels Copper Mining Company was founded. In 1911 the company built a smelter at China Gulch but was soon prohibited by the U.S. Forest Service which had stewardship over the land that was within the Plumas National Forest. Prior to the IV, copper ore was hauled over road to Keddie where the ore was loaded into Western Pacific Railroad freight cars and transported to a smelter at Garfield, Utah.

When the IV opened in 1917, it began hauling passengers and copper ore daily from Lower Camp to the Western Pacific station at Paxton. A year later, the townsite of Engelmine, or Engel, was laid out and gridded near Lower Camp. The townsite peaked in the 1920s when it reached a population of 1,200 people.

In 1930 the Engels mine was closed due to the declining value of copper. However, the IV continued to operate to serve the town and residents until 1938, when the railroad and town were dismantled. The houses were moved to Greenville, Quincy and Portola and the last cabin was removed in the 1960s.

== Locomotives and rolling stock ==
The standard gauge railroad had two locomotives, #1 and #2. The 2-8-0 (consolidation type) locomotives were built in 1891 & 1892 by Baldwin Locomotive Works for the Denver and Rio Grande Railroad. The locomotives (D&RG #661 and #668) were sold to IV in December 1916. The locomotives served the IV until the railroad ceased operations and were scrapped in December 1939. The railroad also had a passenger car and two freight cars.

== Operations ==
While the IV was built primarily to serve the copper mine at Engels, it was also a common carrier. Alvin Fickewirth states that the IV was sold to the Western Pacific Railroad (WP) in 1921. A 1931 public timetable published by WP listed the Indian Valley Railroad with two daily round trip trains. However, Donald B. Robertson's book states that the owner of the IV in 1931 was "California-Engels Mining Company". The railroad ceased operations as a common carrier on December 5, 1938. The line was scrapped and removed within two years.

== Legacy ==
- The Engels Copper mine was the largest copper mine in California and yielded 117 million pounds of copper ore.
- Indian Valley is the name of the valley where the Engels mine was located.

== Route (shown in Western Pacific 1931 Timetable) ==
- MP 0 Paxton, California (Interchange with Western Pacific)
- MP 4 Indian Falls
- MP 8 Crescent Mills, California
- MP 12 Veramont
- MP 17 Starks
- MP 22 Engels

The old railroad right of way was paved over by a road, including portions of State Route 89 and Plumas County Road 213.

== See also ==
- List of defunct California railroads
