= Anaconda Copper Mine =

Anaconda Copper Mine may refer to one of two mines operated by Anaconda Copper

- Anaconda Copper Mine (Nevada)
- Anaconda Copper Mine (Montana)
