= Troy Airport =

- IATA: none; ICAO: none; FAA LID: 57S

Summary
- Airport type: Public
- Owner: United States Forest Service
- Serves: Troy, Montana
- Elevation AMSL: 2,017 ft / 615 m
- Coordinates: 48°28′49″N 115°54′13″W
- Interactive map of Troy Airport

Runways
Direction	Length		Surface
Direction	ft	m	Surface
14/32	3,570	1,088	Asphalt

Statistics (2005)
- Aircraft operations: 700
- Source: Federal Aviation Administration

Troy Airport (FAA LID: 57S) is a public airport located one mile (2 km) northwest of the central business district of Troy, a city in Lincoln County, Montana, United States. It is owned by the United States Forest Service and is situated between U.S. Highway 2 and the Kootenai River in the Kootenai National Forest.

== Facilities and aircraft ==
Troy Airport covers an area of 40 acres (16 ha) which contains one runway designated 14/32 with a 3,570 by 30 ft (1,088 by 9 m) asphalt surface. For the 12-month period ending August 25, 2005, the airport had 700 general aviation aircraft operations, an average of 58 per month.

== See also ==
- List of airports in Montana
