= Montana Highway 56 =

State highway in Montana, United States

Montana Highway 56
- MT 56 highlighted in red

Route information
- Maintained by MDT
- Length: 34.646 mi (55.757 km)

Major junctions
- South end: MT 200 west of Noxon
- North end: US 2 east of Troy

Location
- Country: United States
- State: Montana
- Counties: Sanders, Lincoln

Highway system
- Montana Highway System; Interstate; US; State; Secondary
← MT 55	→ MT 59

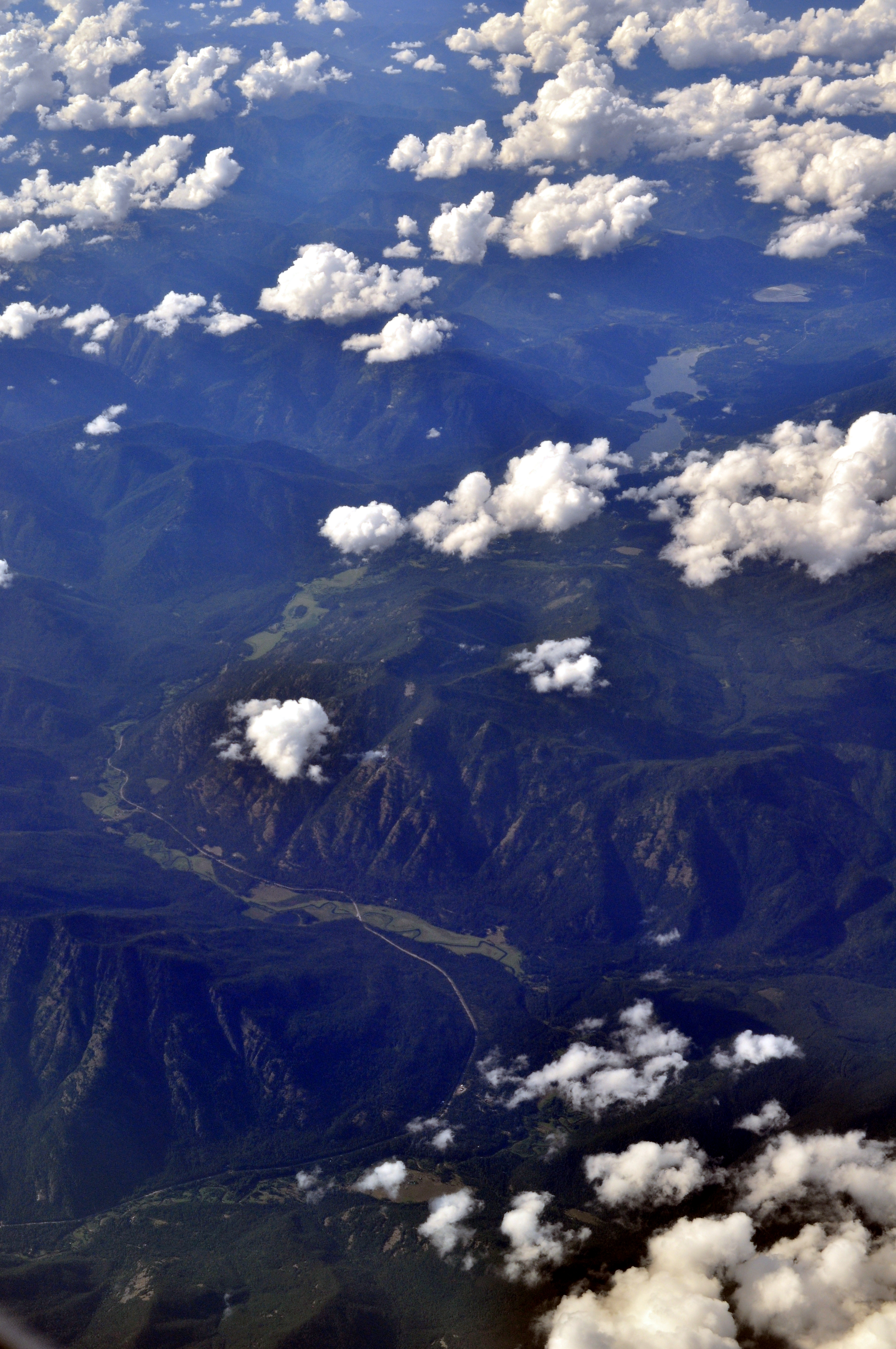
Highway 56 wends its way north through the Bull River valley toward Bull Lake. (Aerial photograph, 2013)

Highway 56 in the U.S. state of Montana is a route running in a northerly direction from an intersection with Montana Highway 200 between Noxon and Heron at an area locally known as "Bull River Junction", about 10 miles (16 km) east of the Idaho state line. The highway extends approximately 35 miles (56 km) to a northern terminus at an intersection with U.S. Route 2, about 3 miles (4.8 km) east of the town of Troy. The highway passes through a forested, mountainous landscape, and travels along the eastern shore of Bull Lake; the Cabinet Mountains are to the east. The entire route is within the boundary of the Kootenai National Forest. Highway 56 is known locally as the "Bull Lake Road" and "Bull River Highway".

== History ==
Before receiving its current designation in 1978, Highway 56 was designated as Montana Secondary Highway 202. The valley is a rarity in that drainage occurs in opposite directions, as Bull River runs south to the Clark Fork River and Bull Lake drains into Lake Creek, which continues north into the Kootenai River.

== Major intersections ==
County	Location	mi	km	Destinations	Notes
Sanders	Noxon	0.000	0.000	MT 200 – Thompson Falls, Spokane	Southern terminus of MT 56
Lincoln	Troy	34.646	55.757	US 2 – Troy, Libby	Northern terminus of MT 56
1.000 mi = 1.609 km; 1.000 km = 0.621 mi
