= Theodore Roosevelt Memorial Bridge =

- U.S. National Register of Historic Places
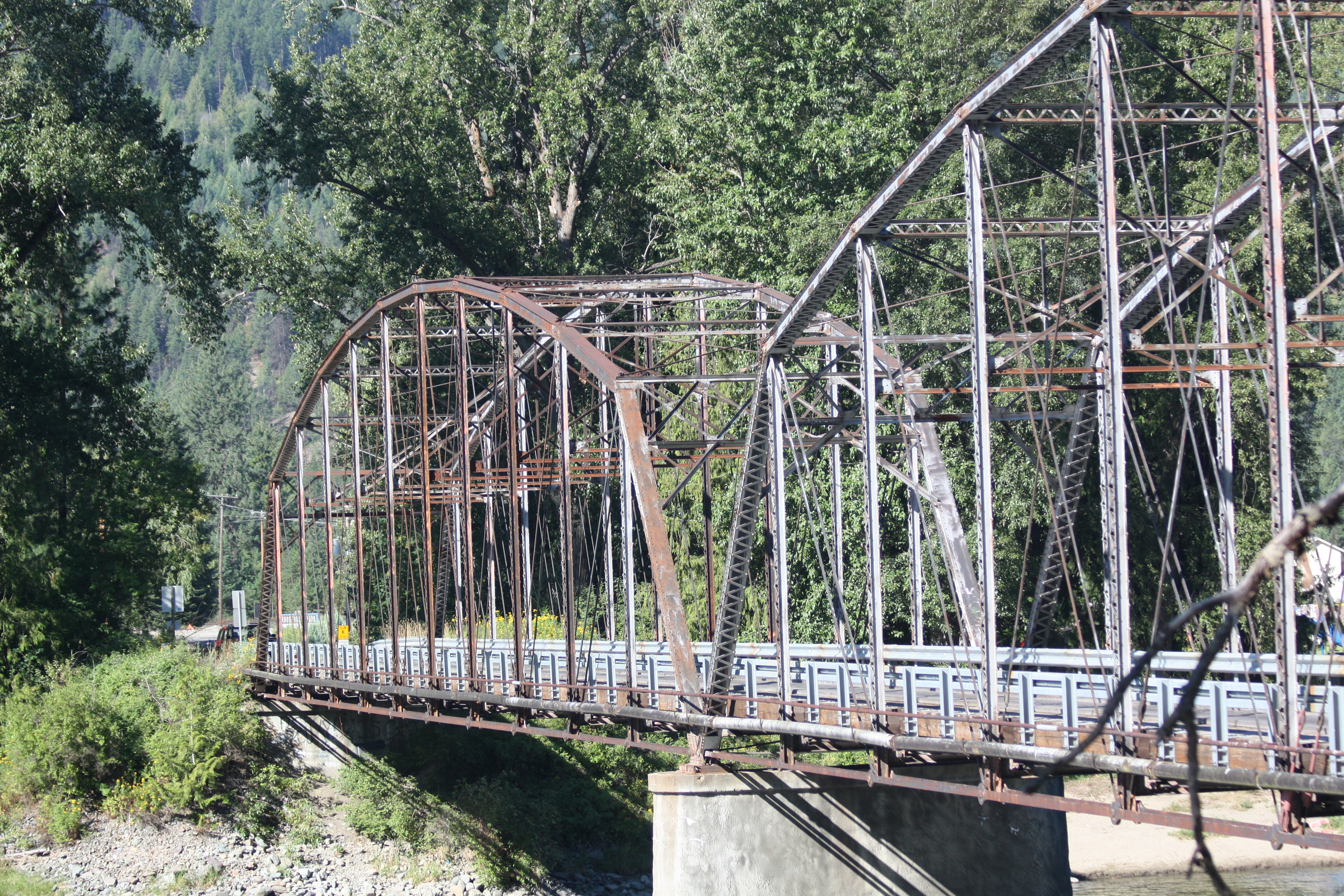

- Location within Montana Location within the United States
- Location: Crossing the Kootenai River at Riverside Dr.
- Coordinates: 48°28′12″N 115°53′11″W
- NRHP reference No.: 06001178
- Added to NRHP: December 27, 2006

The Theodore Roosevelt Memorial Bridge is a steel bridge located in Troy, Montana, USA. It was listed on the National Register of Historic Places on December 27, 2006.

It crosses the Kootenai River at Riverside Drive. It is a 25 feet (7.6 m)-wide single lane bridge with sideways wooden planks and two raised tire lanes which is 345 feet (105 m) long. Its spans rise 32 feet (9.8 m).
