= Troy Jail =

- U.S. National Register of Historic Places
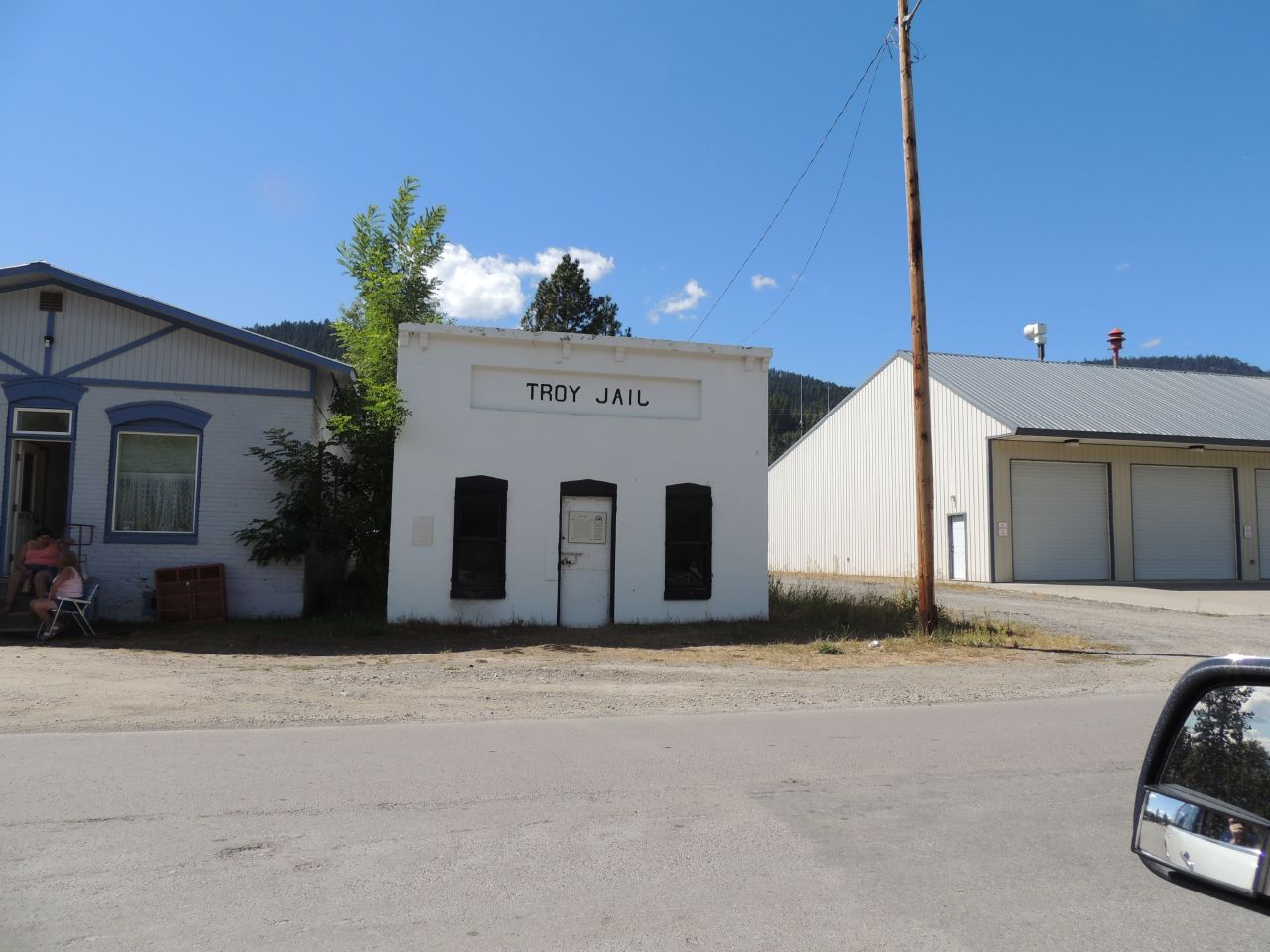

- Location within Montana Location within the United States
- Location: 316 E. Yaak Ave., Troy, Montana
- Coordinates: 48°27′47″N 115°53′21″W
- Area: less than one acre
- Built: 1924
- Built by: Crissey, D.E.
- Architectural style: Early Commercial, Western Commercial
- NRHP reference No.: 06001179
- Added to NRHP: December 27, 2006

The Troy Jail is a historic jail building listed on the National Register of Historic Places in Troy, Montana. It was added to the Register on December 27, 2006.

The current jail was built in 1924 by local builder D.E Crissey for $1,760.00. This fire-resistant, reinforced concrete twenty-by-forty-foot jail replaced the original wood-framed jail which at only ten-by-ten-foot had only enough room for a single cell.
