= List of Superfund sites in Vermont =

This is a list of Superfund sites in Vermont designated under the Comprehensive Environmental Response, Compensation, and Liability Act (CERCLA) environmental law. The CERCLA federal law of 1980 authorized the United States Environmental Protection Agency (EPA) to create a list of polluted locations requiring a long-term response to clean up hazardous material contaminations. These locations are known as Superfund sites, and are placed on the National Priorities List (NPL).

The NPL guides the EPA in "determining which sites warrant further investigation" for environmental remediation. As of April 7, 2026, there were 14 Superfund sites on the National Priorities List in Vermont. No additional sites are currently proposed for entry on the list. Two sites have been cleaned up and removed from the list.

== Superfund sites ==
Deleted from National Priorities List

CERCLIS ID	Name	County	Reason	Proposed	Listed	Construction completed	Partially deleted	Deleted
VTD981064223	Bennington Municipal Sanitary Landfill	Bennington		06/24/1988	03/31/1989	06/30/1999	–	–
VTD003965415	Burgess Brothers Landfill	Bennington		06/24/1988	03/31/1989	03/31/2000	–	–
VTD048141741	Jard Company, Inc.	Bennington		05/12/2014	09/22/2014	–	–	–
VTD069910354	Pownal Tannery	Bennington		09/29/1998	01/19/1999	09/30/2004	–	–
VTD000509174	Tansitor Electronics, Inc.	Bennington		06/24/1988	10/04/1989	10/01/1996	–	09/29/1999
VTD980520118	Darling Hill Dump	Caledonia		06/24/1988	10/04/1989	06/30/1992	–	09/29/1999
VTD981062441	Parker Sanitary Landfill	Caledonia		06/24/1988	02/21/1990	09/30/2005	–	–
VTD098352545	Commerce Street Plume	Chittenden		09/23/2004	04/27/2005	–	–	–
VTD980523062	Pine Street Canal	Chittenden		12/30/1982	09/08/1983	09/16/2004	–	–
VTD988366621	Elizabeth Mine	Orange		12/01/2000	06/14/2001	–	–	–
VTD988366571	Ely Copper Mine	Orange		06/14/2001	09/13/2001	–	–	–
VTD988366720	Pike Hill Copper Mine	Orange		03/08/2004	07/22/2004	–	–	–
VTD980520092	BFI Sanitary Landfill (Rockingham)	Windham		06/24/1988	10/04/1989	09/26/1996	–	–
VTD000860239	Old Springfield Landfill	Windsor		12/30/1982	09/08/1983	09/22/1994	–	–

== See also ==
- List of Superfund sites in the United States
- List of environmental issues
- List of waste types
- TOXMAP
