= Les Balsiger =

American anti-Catholic activist

Les Balsiger (1949 – 2018) was an American religious activist. In the 1990s, Reverend Balsiger, a former car salesman, led a short publicity campaign in the western United States criticizing the Pope as the Antichrist, through his Printed Page Ministries based in Troy, Montana.

Balsinger belonged originally to a Seventh-day Adventist congregation that was thrown out of the denomination by the church's national leadership in a dispute related to the firing of the congregation's pastor.

Balsiger died in 2018.

== Billboard campaign ==
In 1993, Roman Catholic Archbishop Michael Sheehan complained about billboards around Albuquerque, New Mexico that showed a caricature of the Pope with the words "a man of sin." The bishop characterized the billboards, put up by Balsiger's Printed Page Ministries, as "anti-Catholic". Balsiger denied he was anti-Catholic but refused to apologize for the billboards.

Balsiger also attempted, but failed, to place anti-Catholic billboards in Denver, Colorado, during the Pope's visit there in 1993. Balsiger said that his organization paid for 21 billboards to be shown in the Denver area during the Pope's visit. The billboard company, Gannett Outdoors, refused to display any ads attacking the Pope or the Catholic Church. "We paid the money, we have signed the contract, and now they have refused to put them up," said Balsiger. "I don't want to be un-Christian about this, but this isn't the end of this matter. We could be on the courthouse steps (today)," he said. The billboards would have shown a toll-free telephone number, an image of the Pope waving, and the message: "The Bible says, 'The man of sin shall be revealed,' II Thessalonians 2:3." Balsiger said that he would get a court injunction upholding the contract so that the billboards would be displayed while he fought the Gannett anti-defamation policy.

== Other activities ==
Balsiger, who was linked to other Historic Adventist anti-Catholic groups, claimed the anti-Catholic movement has a national following of about 400,000 people. Balsiger was also the publisher of a newspaper, The Protestant, and he opened a training school in Hungary to build up his work in Eastern Europe.
