= Weed Heights, Nevada =

Unincorporated community in Nevada, US

- Unincorporated community
- Location within Nevada Location within the United States
- Coordinates: 38°59′00″N 119°12′35″W
- Country: United States
- State: Nevada
- County: Lyon
- Elevation: 4,666 ft (1,422 m)
- Time zone: UTC-8 (Pacific (PST))
  - Summer (DST): UTC-7 (PDT)
- ZIP codes: 89447
- GNIS feature ID: 845727

Weed Heights is an unincorporated community in Lyon County, Nevada, USA. It is adjacent to Yerington.

== History ==
The Anaconda Copper Company built Weed Heights in 1952, named for Clyde E Weed(1890-1973), vice president in charge of Anaconda operations, to support the Anaconda Mine. A post office was established March 16, 1953. The town was owned by Anaconda until the company was taken over by Atlantic Richfield Company. Atlantic Richfield ceased operations in 1978 and sold the property in 1982 to Don Tibbals, a Lyon County commissioner, who subsequently sold the entire property to Arimetco, with the exception of the town of Weed Heights, which is now a rental community and RV park.
