= Engels Copper Mine =

Coordinates: 40.2027°N 120.7741°W

The Engels Copper Mine was located in Plumas County, California at the north end of the Plumas Copper Belt. The Engels mine was named after Henry A. Engels, who settled the area in the 1880s and began to mine copper. In 1901 the Engels Copper Mining Company was founded. In 1911 the company built a smelter at China Gulch but was soon prohibited by the U.S. Forest Service which had stewardship over the land that was within the Plumas National Forest. Copper ore was hauled over road to Keddie where the ore was loaded into Western Pacific Railroad freight cars and transported to the ASARCO smelter at Garfield, Utah. Road transport was replaced by rail in 1917 when the Indian Valley Railroad opened.

== Townsite ==
In 1918 the townsite of Engelmine, or Engel, was laid out and gridded near Lower Camp. The townsite peaked in the 1920s when it reached a population of 1,200 people. In 1930 the Engels mine was closed due to the declining value of copper. However, the Indian Valley Railroad continued to operate to serve the town and residents until 1938, when the railroad and town were dismantled. The houses were moved to Greenville, Quincy and Portola and the last cabin was removed in the 1960s.
