= Troy Mine =

Silver mine in Montana, United States

Coordinates: 48.2518°N 115.9009°W

The Troy Mine is a silver and copper producer near Troy, Montana, in Lincoln County. It operated between 1981 and 1993, when it was closed. It was re-opened in 2005 to be used as a training site for the Rock Creek Mine, located nearby in Sanders County, Montana.

The Troy Mine produced about 1.25-1.4Moz silver per annum as of 2012; 159,121 pounds of copper and 27,053 pounds of silver between November 2014 and January 2015.

A miner was killed in a cave-in in 2007. Rockslides and rock falls closed the mine in December 2012. It re-opened in September 2014.

In January 2015, Revett Minerals Inc. announced that the Troy Mine would be "placed on care and maintenance" due to low minerals prices.

In March 2015, it was announced that Hecla Mining would purchase both Troy Mine and nearby Rock Creek Mine, and that Troy Mine, which has a $12.9 million reclamation bond, would be closed.

As of 2012, the total reserve base was 12Moz of silver. An estimated 12 years of ore remained in its deposits as of 2015.
