= Elizabeth Mine =

Copper mine in Vermont, United States

- Location within Vermont
- Location: Strafford / Thetford, Orange County, Vermont, United States; 43°48′46″N 72°20′06″W
- Products: Copper
- Type: open-pit, underground
- Opened: 1809
- Closed: 1957
- Superfund site

Information
- CERCLIS ID: VTD988366621
- Contaminants: Mine tailings, metals, sulfides

Progress
- Proposed: December 1, 2000
- Listed: June 14, 2001

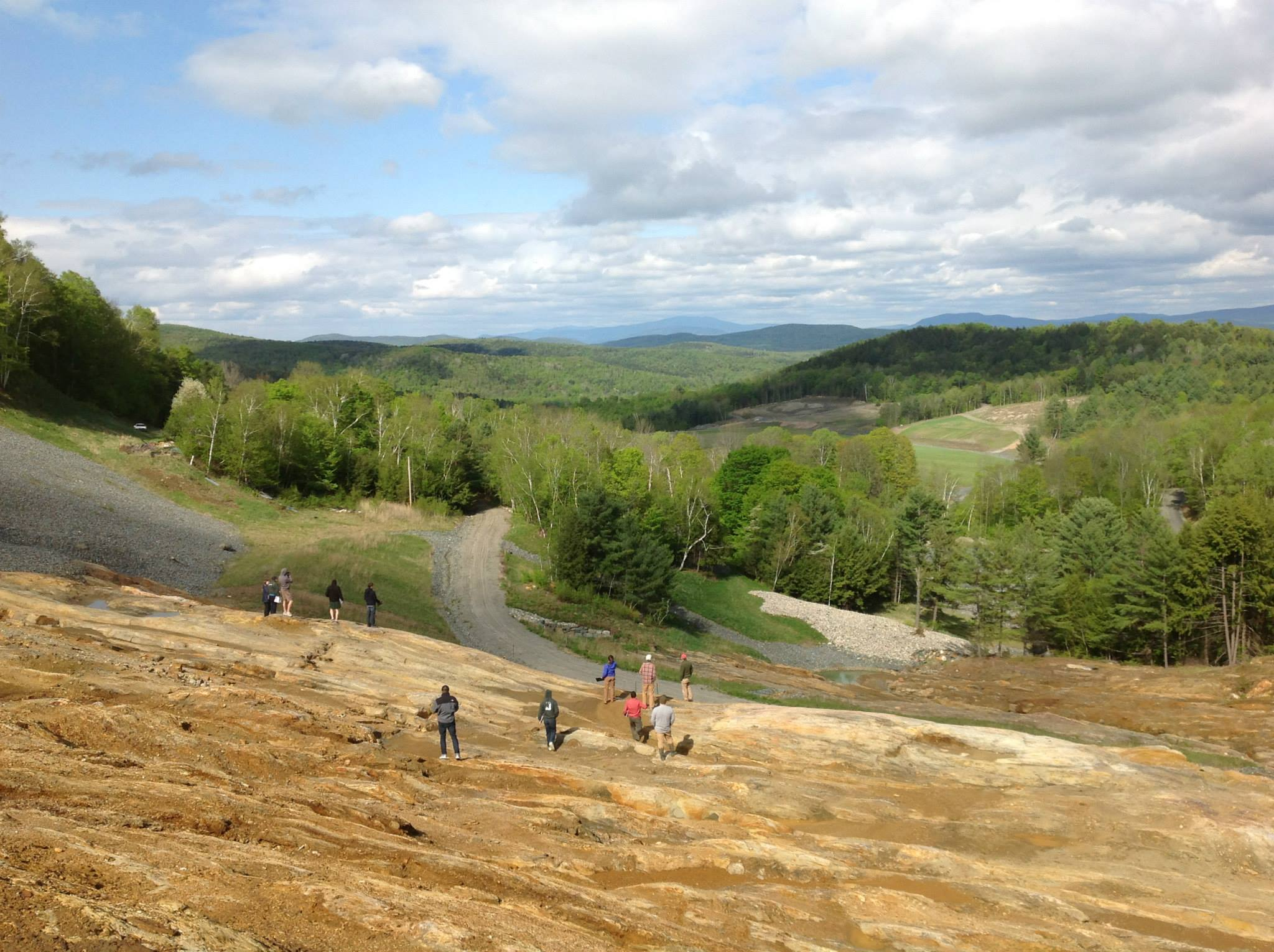
View of tailing and waste rock capped storage and barren ground next to the north cut.

The Elizabeth Mine was a copper mine located on the town line between the Town of Strafford and the Town of Thetford, in Orange County, Vermont.

The ore deposit was discovered in 1793, but mining did not start until 1809. Open pit mining and from 1886 underground mining was conducted. The mine produced up to 8,500,000 pounds (3,900,000 kg) of copper (1954) and was closed in 1957.

Due to acid mine drainage the west branch of the Ompompanoosuc River was polluted. Since 2000 the Environmental Protection Agency (EPA) and the Vermont Agency of Natural Resources have been developing a plan to clean up the area.

== Geology ==
The ore deposits at the Elizabeth Mine represent classic examples of sedimentary exhalative type deposition where hydrothermal fluids enter the marine environment and precipitate out minerals in a strataform ore body. The ores are hosted in the strongly deformed Lower Devonian Gile Mountain Formation (a grey to dark grey mica schist). The ore body at the Elizabeth Mine is a massive sulfide deposit consisting primarily of pyrrhotite and chalcopyrite.

== See also ==
- Copper mining in the United States
- List of Superfund sites in Vermont
