= Troy, Montana =

City in Montana, United States

- City
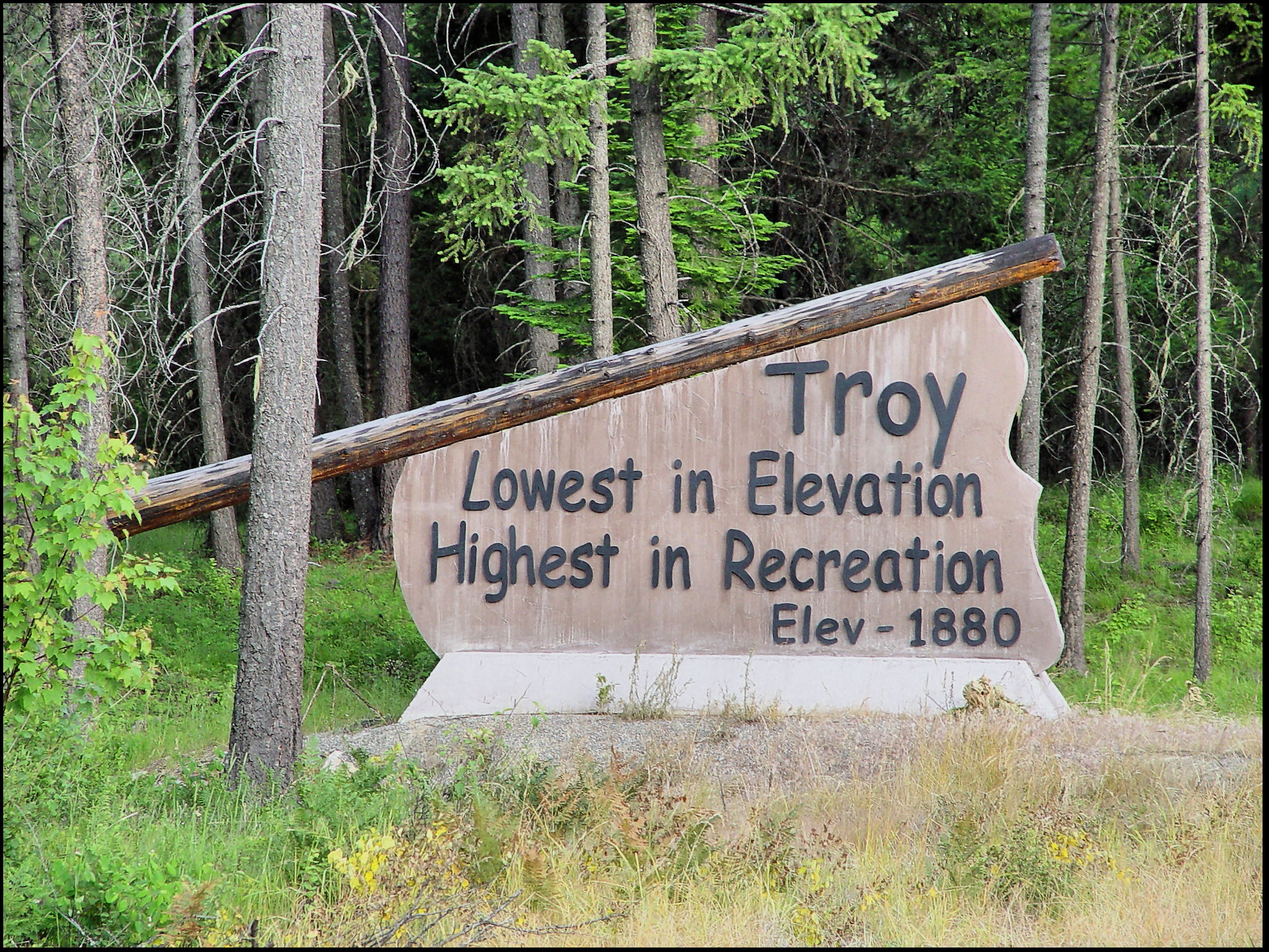

- Location of Troy, Montana
- Coordinates: 48°27′41″N 115°53′27″W
- Country: United States
- State: Montana
- County: Lincoln

Area
  - Total: 0.85 sq mi (2.20 km^{2})
  - Land: 0.85 sq mi (2.19 km^{2})
  - Water: 0.0039 sq mi (0.01 km^{2})
- Elevation: 1,900 ft (580 m)

Population (2020)
  - Total: 797
  - Density: 941.6/sq mi (363.57/km^{2})
- Time zone: UTC-7 (Mountain (MST))
  - Summer (DST): UTC-6 (MDT)
- ZIP code: 59935
- Area code: 406
- FIPS code: 30-75025
- GNIS feature ID: 2412101
- Website: cityoftroymontana.com

Troy is a city in Lincoln County, Montana, United States. The population was 797 at the 2020 census. It lies at the lowest elevation of any settlement in Montana. The town is on U.S. Route 2, near Montana Highway 56, in the Kootenai River gorge by the Kootenai National Forest.

Originally inhabited by the Kutenai and other Interior Salish peoples as well as the Piegan Blackfeet, the area was settled by miners in the 1880s. Troy was registered as a town in 1892 and grew quickly after the Great Northern Railway built a freight station there, leading to a boom in workers, miners, their families, and associates. The area narrowly missed wildfire damage in 1910 and expanded its services throughout the following years, though its population would drop due to a series of misfortunes in the late 1920s before rebounding in the following decades. Troy suffered from the area's contamination from nearby vermiculite mines contaminated with particularly fragile asbestos, leading to the town's inclusion in the United States Environmental Protection Agency's (EPA) National Priorities List status in 2002 and Public Health Emergency event in 2009. According to the EPA, most risk was reduced by 2015.

Troy is on U.S. Route 2, between Yaak and Libby. Montana Highway 56 is three miles southeast and the Troy Airport is two miles northwest. The town's economy has historically been supported by mining and logging, while in recent times, mining has remained, with the addition of education, retail, and tourism. Local natural features such as the Kootenai Falls have attracted tourism to the area and have been featured in movies such as The River Wild (1994) and The Revenant (2015). There is a public school district (which created ceramic ornaments used to decorate the National Christmas Tree in 2017) and a public library, and the town is in-district for Flathead Valley Community College.

== History ==
Before the westward expansion of the United States, various indigenous peoples lived in the area, with the Kutenai and Bitterroot Salish as the most recent and the Piegan Blackfeet earlier. They lived in base camps and seasonal camps based on the availability of plants and fish: "lower elevations in the winter and ... uplands in the summer and fall," with spring camps near camas prairies, which had edible bulbs. Due to the area's geography and settler fears of the Kutenai, the area remained unsettled until gold was discovered in the 1860s and galena and vermiculite in the 1880s. In 1886, the first miners arrived, prospecting on the Kootenai River at a tent camp first known as "Lake Camp, Lake Creek Camp, and Lake City", and making land claims on Grouse Mountain. In 1892, a William O'Brien surveyed the Lake City claim, renaming it Troy.

=== Post American settlement ===
Throughout 1892, Troy was filed as a town in then-Missoula County and grew rapidly as the Great Northern Railway chose a nearby site as a "division yard", or freight terminal, which was first renamed "West Troy" before just becoming Troy itself as the Lake City area was abandoned. The town's first hotel, then called the Windsor Hotel, was built. One transplant described the town as such: "Fifteen saloons gaily lit filled to the doors with “wild men and wild women” yelling, singing, dancing, and cursing, with glasses held high, such was Troy. Two large dance halls were in evidence, one grocery store run by John Bowen, several 'beaneries' (called restaurants by some), one drug store owned by 'Doc' Sailey and many shacks and tents where the 'wild women' congregated. Fights and ribaldry were the order of the days and nights." Another grocery store followed in 1893, the first one-room schoolhouse was built in 1894, and more mining companies, land claims, and support services such as ferries sprung up as gold was discovered on the Yaak River in 1895.

The 1910s brought change. After the Windsor Hotel had been destroyed by fire in 1906 and rebuilt in 1907, wildfires during the summer of 1910 narrowly missed Troy by a few miles but raged throughout the area, causing lasting damage to the newly-protected Kootenai National Forest. In 1912, Troy's first bridge across the Kootenai River was built, along with bridges in Libby and Rexford, after a county vote. Previously, crossings were made on horseback – dangerous – or via ferries, which had started operating in 1892. Phone service reached the area in 1913. U.S. Route 2 was proposed and a volunteer fire department was created. The 1918 flu closed the local mill and schools temporarily. By 1920, there was a Chinese restaurant, a church, and an electric plant in town, and World War I increased the town's mining activity; the rapid expansion and labor conditions sometimes led to strikes and labor conflicts.

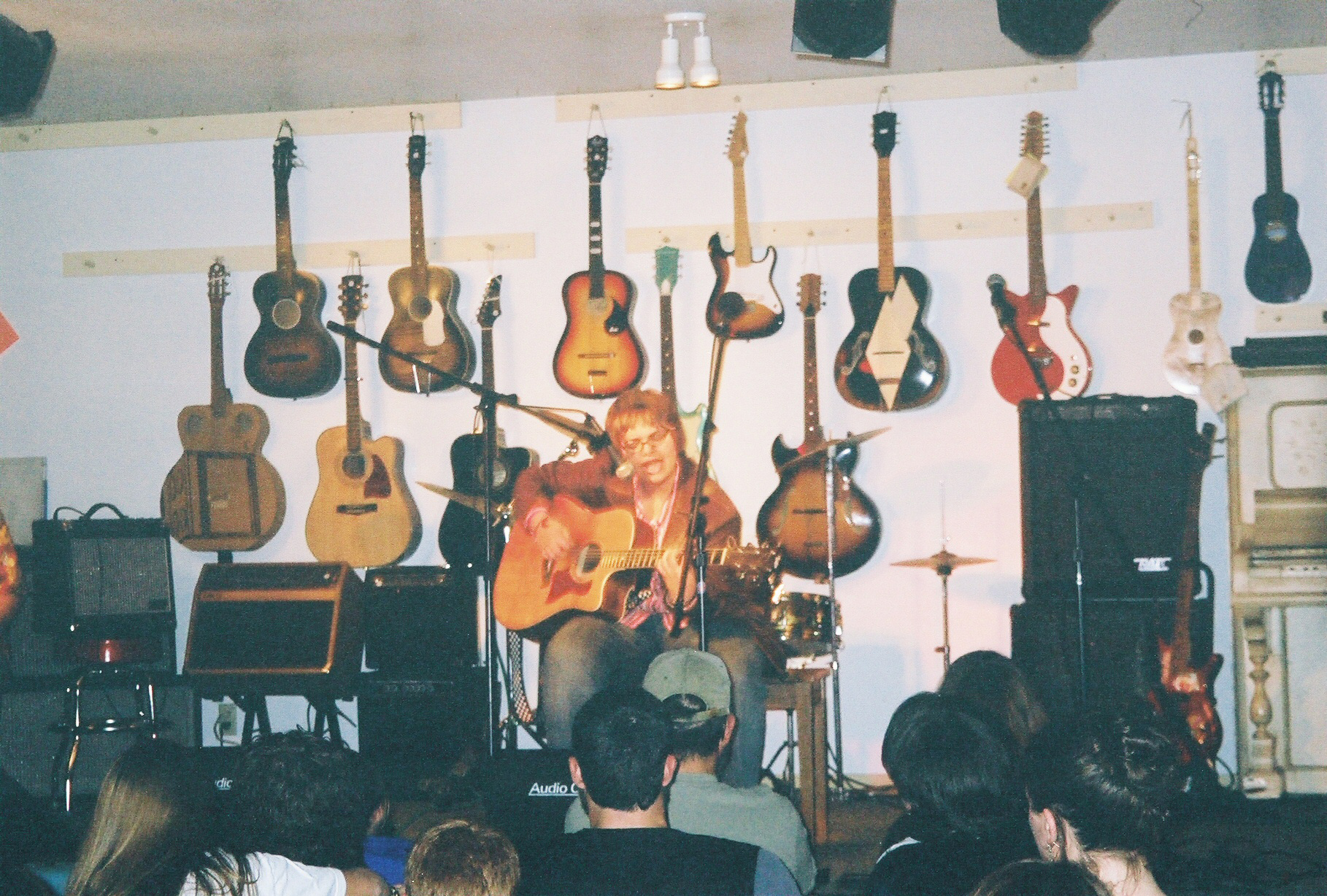
A show at the Hot Club, which stands on the site of the former Windsor Hotel

The town's population reached 1000 residents in 1924, and the same year, the town's Lincoln Theatre opened. The population peaked around 1926, but in March of that year, the Great Northern Railway moved its freight terminal elsewhere, leaving "only three supervisors and [a] small force of Japanese [workers]." Fires destroyed a concentrator in 1927 and a sawmill in 1928, with neither rebuilt, and the region's mines decreased in activity.

The population dropped to as low as 428 during 1930 in the Great Depression. Still, the Lincoln Theatre began playing talking movies and the Windsor Hotel was renamed to the Great Northern Hotel, which stood until it burned down (for the second time) in 1941. A coffee house and cable shop operate on its former location. The Lincoln Theatre was remodeled in 1994.

In 2006, the Troy Jail and the Theodore Roosevelt Memorial Bridge were added to the National Register of Historic Places.

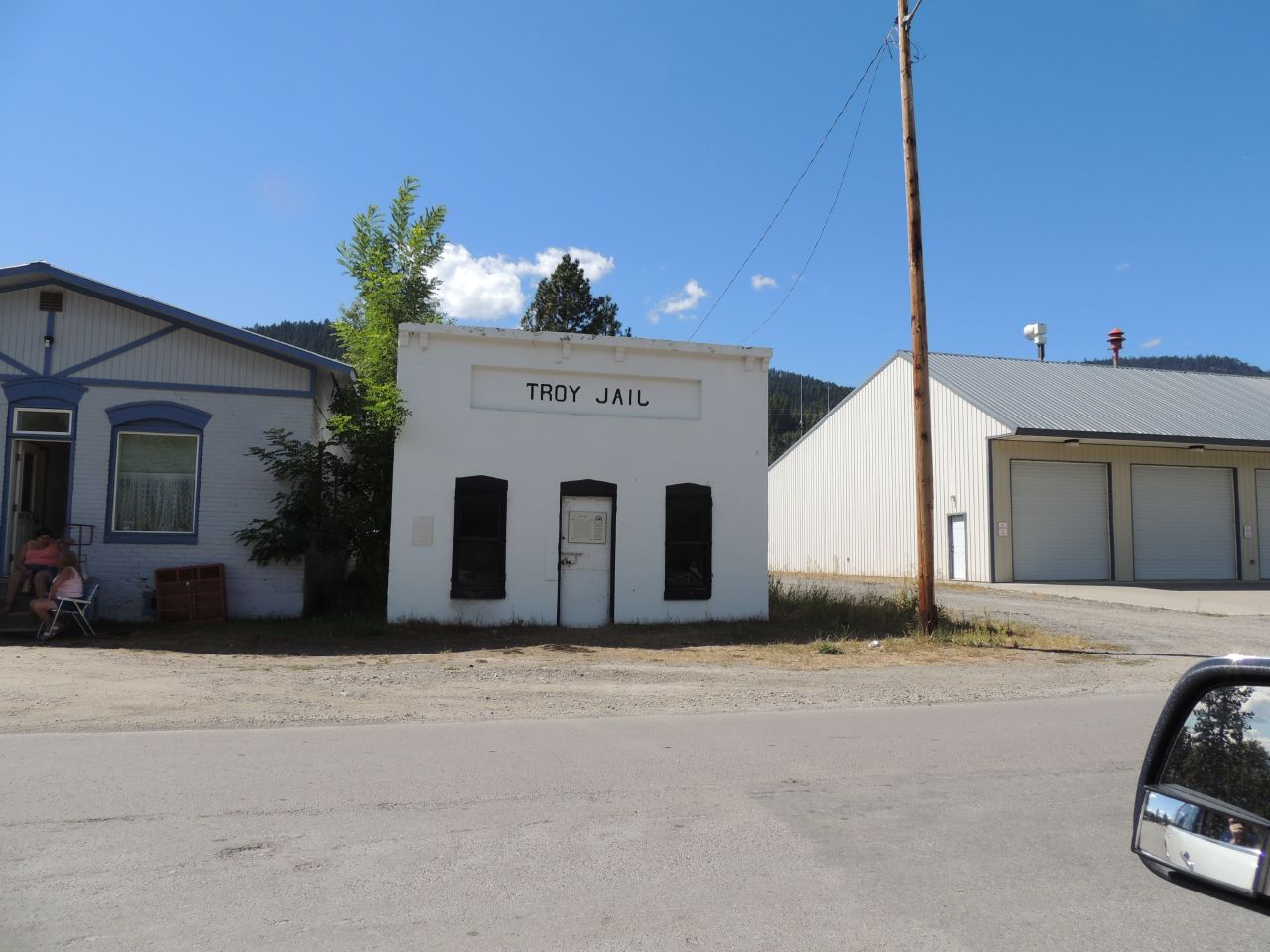
The Troy Jail

=== Vermiculite cleanup ===
After citizens, media, and local government raised concerns, the United States Environmental Protection Agency began in 1999 to investigate the contamination of the area surrounding Libby and Troy from vermiculite mines in Libby, which were themselves contaminated with a toxic and easily crumbled form of tremolite-actinolite series asbestos, sometimes named Libby Amphibole asbestos (LA). Removal actions began in 2000, and in 2002 the site was moved to the EPA's Superfund National Priorities List. In 2009, the EPA declared a Public Health Emergency (the first in the EPA's history) "to provide federal health care assistance for victims of asbestos-related disease."

In 2015, an EPA review of toxicity and risks found that the cleanups had managed asbestos exposure risk effectively. By the end of 2018, the EPA had removed "more than one million cubic yards of contaminated soil," and area cleanup was completed that year, except for the location of the former mine, which is the disposal site of the contaminated soil. Contaminated construction materials were disposed of "in a specially designed landfill cell." The remaining contamination is limited to the forests and property in or near the former mine, with cleanup plans pending and with controls for higher exposures during wildfire fighting.

The EPA transferred control of the site to the Montana Department of Environmental Quality in 2020.

== Geography ==
Troy lies in a valley along the Kootenai River between the Purcell Mountains to the northeast and the Cabinet Mountains to the southwest.

According to the United States Census Bureau, the city has a total area of 0.78 square miles (2.02 km^{2}), of which 0.76 square miles (1.97 km^{2}) is land and 0.02 square miles (0.05 km^{2}) is water. Troy has an elevation of approximately 1,800 feet (550 m) above sea level and is the lowest town in elevation in Montana. Troy is 12 miles (19 km) from the border of Montana and Idaho. Troy's next closest city is Libby, which is 18 miles (29 km) away.

The Troy Mine, which produced silver and copper, was scheduled for closure in February 2015.

An early worker described the original flora of the city site as "a carpet of velvety green grass, thickly studded with wild flowers of most every hue and color." There are groves of ancient western red cedars nearby, some up to 12 feet (3.7 m) in diameter, which are a home for species of wildlife including pikas and flying squirrels.

Troy is located in the Kootenai River Gorge, which is geologically composed of "sandstone and thin layers of shale, with folds from compression that dates back 50 to 100 million years ago. ... Ancient ripple marks and large stromatolites (the remains of algae mats) are visible in the canyon." Rocks belonging to the Belt Supergroup were deposited about 1.5 billion years ago. During that time much of western Montana was covered by shallow seas or lakes and surrounded by very flat shores.

=== Climate ===
This climatic region is typified by large seasonal temperature differences, with warm to hot (and often humid) summers and cold (sometimes severely cold) winters. According to the Köppen Climate Classification system, Troy has a humid continental climate, abbreviated "Dsb" on climate maps. Troy's annual mean temperature is 46.4 °F (8.0 °C) and its annual mean precipitation is 24.6 inches (620 mm). Flooding is an issue for the area.

Climate data for Troy, Montana (1991–2020 normals, extremes 1960–present)
Month	Jan	Feb	Mar	Apr	May	Jun	Jul	Aug	Sep	Oct	Nov	Dec	Year
Record high °F (°C)	57 (14)	64 (18)	82 (28)	87 (31)	97 (36)	109 (43)	110 (43)	110 (43)	102 (39)	84 (29)	69 (21)	60 (16)	110 (43)
Mean daily maximum °F (°C)	32.7 (0.4)	39.0 (3.9)	49.7 (9.8)	59.1 (15.1)	69.8 (21.0)	75.8 (24.3)	86.7 (30.4)	86.0 (30.0)	74.9 (23.8)	56.5 (13.6)	40.6 (4.8)	32.4 (0.2)	58.6 (14.8)
Daily mean °F (°C)	27.8 (−2.3)	31.3 (−0.4)	38.9 (3.8)	46.0 (7.8)	54.9 (12.7)	61.0 (16.1)	68.1 (20.1)	66.8 (19.3)	58.3 (14.6)	45.6 (7.6)	34.9 (1.6)	27.9 (−2.3)	46.8 (8.2)
Mean daily minimum °F (°C)	22.9 (−5.1)	23.6 (−4.7)	28.0 (−2.2)	33.0 (0.6)	40.1 (4.5)	46.2 (7.9)	49.4 (9.7)	47.7 (8.7)	41.7 (5.4)	34.6 (1.4)	29.3 (−1.5)	23.5 (−4.7)	35.0 (1.7)
Record low °F (°C)	−28 (−33)	−20 (−29)	−6 (−21)	8 (−13)	22 (−6)	27 (−3)	26 (−3)	31 (−1)	17 (−8)	−3 (−19)	−14 (−26)	−35 (−37)	−35 (−37)
Average precipitation inches (mm)	2.63 (67)	1.85 (47)	2.44 (62)	1.65 (42)	1.79 (45)	2.52 (64)	0.88 (22)	0.71 (18)	1.21 (31)	2.42 (61)	3.50 (89)	2.79 (71)	24.39 (620)
Average precipitation days (≥ 0.01 in)	13.6	9.6	11.2	8.9	10.3	10.5	4.7	4.5	6.4	9.1	14.1	12.6	115.5
Source: NOAA

== Demographics ==
Historical population
Census	Pop.	Note	%±
1920	763		—
1930	498		−34.7%
1940	796		59.8%
1950	770		−3.3%
1960	855		11.0%
1970	1,046		22.3%
1980	1,088		4.0%
1990	953		−12.4%
2000	957		0.4%
2010	938		−2.0%
2020	797		−15.0%
U.S. Decennial Census

=== 2010 census ===
As of the census of 2010, there were 938 people, 454 households, and 240 families residing in the city. The population density was 1,234.2 inhabitants per square mile (476.5/km^{2}). There were 490 housing units at an average density of 644.7 units per square mile (248.9 units/km^{2}). The racial makeup of the city was 94.3% White, 0.2% African American, 1.7% Native American, 0.5% Asian, 0.1% from other races, and 3.1% from two or more races. Hispanic or Latino of any race were 1.9% of the population.

There were 454 households, of which 25.1% had children under the age of 18 living with them, 37.2% were married couples living together, 9.5% had a female householder with no husband present, 6.2% had a male householder with no wife present, and 47.1% were non-families. 37.4% of all households were made up of individuals, and 13.8% had someone living alone who was 65 years of age or older. The average household size was 2.07 and the average family size was 2.71.

The median age in the city was 46.8 years. 20% of residents were under the age of 18; 5.5% were between the ages of 18 and 24; 21.9% were from 25 to 44; 35.7% were from 45 to 64; and 16.8% were 65 years of age or older. The gender makeup of the city was 49.3% male and 50.7% female.

== Economy and recreation ==
The area is covered by the Lincoln County Port Authority. Troy's modern economy is largely based on "mining, education, retail, and tourism," while its historical economy was based on mining and logging. A train freight yard, a sawmill, and an ore processing facility were the main employers until they were lost to relocation and fires in the late 1920s, just before the Great Depression. Gold, galena, and vermiculite were mined beginning in the late 1800s. During World War I, the town's mines produced lead, zinc, and silver, with much zinc exported to Belgium. In 2020, the Montana Community Solar Project assessed Troy public schools for their solar power potential and found the high school building had good potential. Since 2008, the school and city have been partially fueled by wood pellet waste from nearby lumber mills, replacing fuel oil use.

Notable nearby attractions include the Kootenai Falls and the Kootenai Falls Swinging Bridge, which was rebuilt in 2019 due to its increasing popularity. The Theodore Roosevelt Memorial Bridge in Troy is listed on the National Register of Historic Places.

Local activities include hiking, snowmobiling, camping, boating, rafting, bird watching, fishing, and geocaching. The Rocky Mountain Elk Foundation was founded by four Troy hunters to help conserve elk and other wildlife species. There is a disc golf course at the Troy Museum and Visitors' Center, which also hosts art events with the local glass art guild. Nearby parks host various cultural and music festivals.

== Government ==
Troy has a mayor and four city councilors. Each member has a four year term. Incumbent T.J. Boswell was elected mayor during the 2025 elections. Boswell was previously sworn in as mayor in November 2024 after the resignation of Chuck Ekstedt.

== Education ==
Troy has a public library, a branch of the Lincoln County Public Libraries. The town's branch opened in 1922 after the Lincoln County's Free County Library expanded.

Troy's first school, a one-room schoolhouse, was built in 1894. In 1937, the Bull Lake School in Bull Lake Valley and Fall Creek School by Schoolhouse Lake were consolidated into the Troy public school district. The public school district includes:

- W.F. Morrison Elementary School (Kindergarten–Sixth grade)
- Troy Junior-Senior High School (Seventh grade–Twelfth grade)

The high school provides adult education classes in the fall and spring. The school has a "school-to-work" program in which students can participate in summer projects based in the local economy and in which an AmeriCorps volunteer serves as a mentor for student college applications/visits and community involvement in student activities. After the Troy Art Club's ceramic ornaments were some of the ones chosen for the US National Christmas Tree in 2017, the club created a business, Wild In Montana, "assisting [the] economically depressed community and offering a class with real-world skills."

Other nearby schools with Troy addresses include:

- McCormick Elementary School (K-8)
- Yaak Elementary School (K-8)

The area qualifies for in-district tuition at Flathead Valley Community College (FVCC) in Kalispell, Montana, as well as FVCC's Lincoln County Campus in Libby, which has the "Glacier Bank Adult Basic Education Learning Center where students can take free classes in preparation for their GED exams."

== Transportation ==
Troy is on U.S. Route 2, between Yaak to the north and Libby to the southeast. Montana Highway 56 is three miles to the southeast of Troy.

The Troy Airport is one mile northwest of the majority of the town of Troy.

The closest Amtrak stop is Libby station, 18 miles (29 km) away. The Empire Builder served Troy until February 15, 1973.

== Notable people ==
- Les Balsiger, religious activist with a Troy office
- Rachel Dolezal, Trans-racial civil rights activist
- B. C. Edwards, football coach (died in Troy)
- Jay Ward, Major League Baseball player who retired in Troy

== Popular culture ==
Troy is featured in Max Brooks' post-apocalyptic zombie novel World War Z as a safe zone for humanity.

2011 novella Train Dreams mentions the town.
