= National Register of Historic Places listings in Mineral County, Montana =

Location of Mineral County in Montana

This is a list of the National Register of Historic Places listings in Mineral County, Montana.

This is intended to be a complete list of the properties and districts on the National Register of Historic Places in Mineral County, Montana, United States. The locations of National Register properties and districts for which the latitude and longitude coordinates are included below, may be seen in a map.

There are 18 properties and districts listed on the National Register in the county.

This National Park Service list is complete through NPS recent listings posted August 28, 2026.

== Current listings ==
	Name on the Register	Image	Date listed	Location	City or town	Description
1	Alberton School	Alberton School	January 13, 1997 (#96001599)	216 Railroad Street; 47°00′17″N 114°28′50″W	Alberton	
2	Bestwick's Market	Bestwick's Market	January 13, 1997 (#96001600)	Railroad Street east of its junction with Interstate 90; 47°00′13″N 114°28′36″W	Alberton	
3	Brinks House	Brinks House	January 13, 1997 (#96001601)	416 Railroad Street; 47°00′14″N 114°28′42″W	Alberton	
4	Chadwick House	Chadwick House	January 13, 1997 (#96001602)	320 Railroad Street; 47°00′15″N 114°28′45″W	Alberton	
5	Chicago, Milwaukee, St. Paul and Pacific Railroad Company Historic District	Chicago, Milwaukee, St. Paul and Pacific Railroad Company Historic District	October 26, 2000 (#00001269)	Idaho Panhandle National Forest; 47°21′46″N 115°39′30″W	St. Regis	
6	De Borgia Schoolhouse	De Borgia Schoolhouse	December 27, 1979 (#79001405)	Thompson Falls De Borgia Rd. 47°22′50″N 115°20′49″W	De Borgia	
7	Gildersleeve Mine	Gildersleeve Mine	June 26, 2002 (#02000723)	Lolo National Forest; 47°02′09″N 115°02′04″W	Superior	
8	Methodist Church of Alberton	Methodist Church of Alberton	January 13, 1997 (#96001604)	802 Railroad Street; 47°00′10″N 114°28′26″W	Alberton	
9	Railroad Depot	Railroad Depot	January 13, 1997 (#96001603)	701 Railroad Street; 47°00′10″N 114°28′30″W	Alberton	
10	Natural Pier Bridge	Natural Pier Bridge	January 4, 2010 (#09001182)	Milepost 1 on S. Frontage Rd. 47°00′50″N 114°30′28″W	Alberton	
11	Point of Rocks Historic Transportation Corridor	Point of Rocks Historic Transportation Corridor	September 4, 2009 (#09000683)	2 miles (3.2 km) west of Alberton; 47°00′42″N 114°32′52″W	Alberton	
12	St. Regis Airway Beacon		November 8, 2021 (#100007145)	2 miles (3.2 km) SE of St. Regis; 47°17′14″N 115°03′02″W	St. Regis vicinity	
13	Savenac Nursery Historic District	Savenac Nursery Historic District	August 16, 1999 (#99000988)	Interstate 90 south of Haugan; 47°23′07″N 115°23′47″W	Haugan	
14	Scenic Bridge	Scenic Bridge	January 4, 2010 (#09001183)	Milepost 0 on Old U.S. Route 10 W. 47°01′12″N 114°39′27″W	Tarkio	
15	Superior School	Superior School	March 21, 1997 (#97000253)	River Road, approximately 0.25 miles (0.40 km) north of Interstate 90; 47°11′42″N 114°53′25″W	Superior	School built during 1915-16, with vernacular and Colonial Revival style.
16	Swanson Homestead		November 22, 2022 (#100008425)	547 Donally Lane; 47°02′47″N 114°46′53″W	Superior vicinity	
17	Thorn House		January 13, 1997 (#96001605)	140 2nd Street; 47°00′19″N 114°28′54″W	Alberton	
18	Wilson House	Wilson House	January 13, 1997 (#96001606)	114 Adams Street; 47°00′06″N 114°28′14″W	Alberton	

== See also ==
- List of National Historic Landmarks in Montana
- National Register of Historic Places listings in Montana
