= Thorn House =

Thorn House or Thorne House may refer to:

A thorn house, another name for a Graduation tower

== Places ==
in the United States (by state)

- Thorn-Stingley House, Homer, Alaska, listed on the NRHP in Kenai Peninsula Borough, Alaska
- Thorn House (San Andreas, California), listed on the National Register of Historic Places in Calaveras County, California
- Parson Thorne Mansion, Milford, Delaware, listed on the NRHP in Kent County, Delaware
- George R. Thorne House, Midlothian, Illinois, listed on the NRHP in Cook County, Illinois
- Thorn House (Alberton, Montana), listed on the National Register of Historic Places in Mineral County, Montana
- Thorne and Eddy Estates, Morristown, New Jersey, listed on the NRHP in Morris County, New Jersey

== See also ==
- W. T. Thorne Building, Minden, Nebraska, listed on the NRHP in Kearney County, Nebraska
