= List of lakes of Mineral County, Montana =

There are at least 42 named lakes and reservoirs in Mineral County, Montana.

== Lakes ==
- Bonanza Lakes, 47°05′26″N 115°08′11″W, el. 6,302 feet (1,921 m)
- Bouchard Lake, 47°13′15″N 115°00′02″W, el. 2,943 feet (897 m)
- Cedar Log Lakes, 46°47′17″N 114°49′04″W, el. 5,981 feet (1,823 m)
- Clear Lake, 47°16′07″N 115°24′28″W, el. 5,837 feet (1,779 m)
- Cliff Lake, 47°08′18″N 115°11′26″W, el. 5,932 feet (1,808 m)
- Copper Lake, 47°25′25″N 115°42′20″W, el. 4,980 feet (1,520 m)
- Crater Lake, 46°55′37″N 114°52′59″W, el. 5,676 feet (1,730 m)
- Mineral County, 47°17′49″N 115°25′20″W, el. 5,472 feet (1,668 m)
- Dalton Lake, 46°56′16″N 114°57′21″W, el. 6,302 feet (1,921 m)
- Deep Creek Lake, 47°02′38″N 115°00′20″W, el. 6,106 feet (1,861 m)
- Diamond Lake, 47°08′50″N 115°10′37″W, el. 5,413 feet (1,650 m)
- French Lake, 46°58′03″N 114°56′19″W, el. 6,125 feet (1,867 m)
- Gold Lake, 47°18′03″N 115°22′48″W, el. 5,997 feet (1,828 m)
- Hazel Lake, 47°16′22″N 115°21′59″W, el. 5,387 feet (1,642 m)
- Heart Lake, 47°06′29″N 115°10′05″W, el. 6,188 feet (1,886 m)
- Heart Lake, 46°56′56″N 114°58′18″W, el. 5,745 feet (1,751 m)
- Heart Lake, 47°17′03″N 115°27′19″W, el. 5,548 feet (1,691 m)
- Hidden Lake, 47°07′21″N 115°10′09″W, el. 5,718 feet (1,743 m)
- Hidden Lake, 46°57′30″N 114°59′04″W, el. 6,056 feet (1,846 m)
- Hoodoo Lake, 46°58′42″N 115°00′15″W, el. 5,863 feet (1,787 m)
- Hub Lake, 47°16′31″N 115°22′36″W, el. 5,712 feet (1,741 m)
- Lenora Lake, 47°15′10″N 115°17′49″W, el. 5,338 feet (1,627 m)
- Lost Lake, 47°06′09″N 115°07′39″W, el. 6,027 feet (1,837 m)
- Mary Lake, 47°16′20″N 115°22′43″W, el. 6,401 feet (1,951 m)
- Missoula Lake, 47°03′48″N 115°06′59″W, el. 6,063 feet (1,848 m)
- Moore Lake, 47°10′49″N 115°15′09″W, el. 5,305 feet (1,617 m)
- Mud Lake, 46°47′52″N 114°50′38″W, el. 6,230 feet (1,900 m)
- Oregon Lakes, 47°03′12″N 115°05′36″W, el. 5,905 feet (1,800 m)
- Pearl Lake, 46°56′39″N 114°57′38″W, el. 6,266 feet (1,910 m)
- Rudie Lake, 47°17′18″N 115°25′00″W, el. 5,663 feet (1,726 m)
- Saint Regis Lake, 47°25′34″N 115°44′34″W, el. 5,594 feet (1,705 m)
- Siamese Lakes, 46°51′20″N 114°54′48″W, el. 5,984 feet (1,824 m)
- Silver Lake, 47°21′33″N 115°34′00″W, el. 5,318 feet (1,621 m)
- Square Lake, 47°15′49″N 115°21′39″W, el. 5,676 feet (1,730 m)
- Straight Lake, 46°51′40″N 114°56′26″W, el. 6,394 feet (1,949 m)
- Surveyor Lake, 46°49′18″N 114°45′33″W, el. 5,961 feet (1,817 m)
- Trail Lake, 47°00′19″N 115°02′32″W, el. 5,784 feet (1,763 m)
- Trio Lakes, 46°56′03″N 114°56′25″W, el. 5,827 feet (1,776 m)
- Twomile Pond, 47°17′48″N 115°09′41″W, el. 2,723 feet (830 m)
- Upper Saint Regis Lake, 47°25′35″N 115°44′55″W, el. 5,554 feet (1,693 m)
- Wilson Lake, 47°09′27″N 115°05′54″W, el. 6,024 feet (1,836 m)
- Windfall Lake, 47°00′22″N 114°55′41″W, el. 6,713 feet (2,046 m)

== See also ==
- List of lakes in Montana
