= Gildersleeve Mine =

- U.S. National Register of Historic Places
- U.S. Historic district
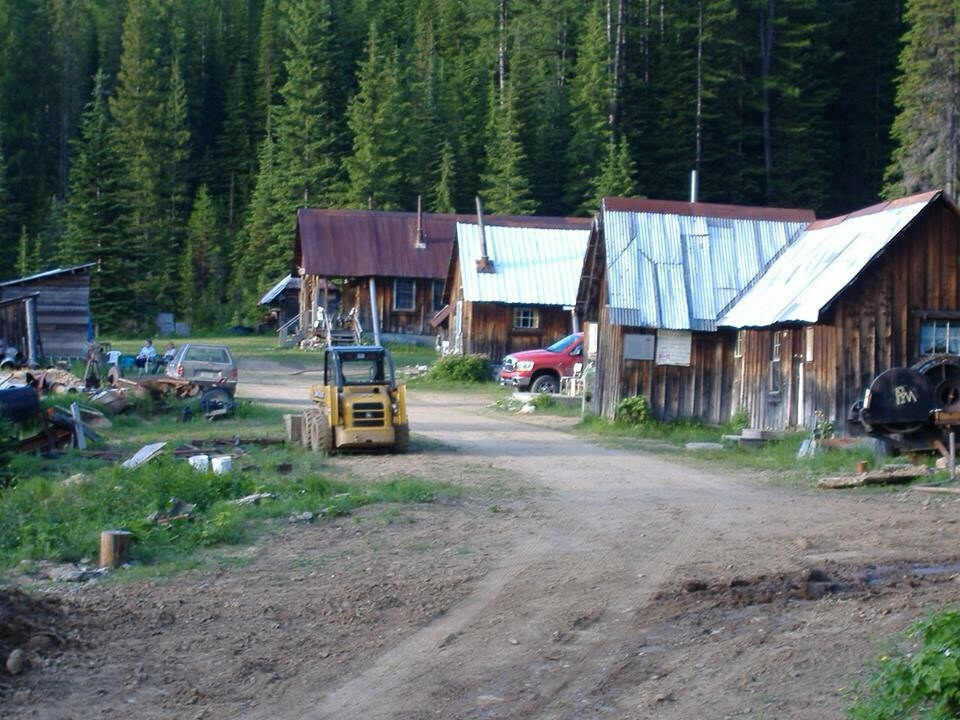
- Cabins at Gildersleeve Mine, 2014

- Location within Montana Location within the United States
- Location: Lolo National Forest, Superior, Montana
- Coordinates: 47°02′09″N 115°02′04″W
- Area: 5 acres (2.0 ha)
- Built: 1931
- NRHP reference No.: 02000723
- Added to NRHP: June 26, 2002

The Gildersleeve Mine, in Lolo National Forest near Superior in Mineral County, Montana, was a gold and barite mine listed on the National Register of Historic Places in 2002.

The listed 5 acres (2.0 ha) area included nine contributing buildings, two contributing sites, two contributing structures, and a contributing object. These include:

- cook / main house, a 48.5 by 10.25 feet (14.78 m × 3.12 m) one-story frame building
- bunkhouse
- little house / office
- blacksmith shop and drying area
- two outhouses
- meat house
- chicken coop
- wood shed
- mine adit
- water system
- mining equipment
- tailings pile

It was deemed notable as "the most complete depression-era mining camp remaining in western Montana. Located within the Cedar Creek Historic Mining District, the Gildersleeve mine is the heart of a family-run hard rock mining operation established and run by the Gildersleeve family of Superior, Montana. It is a unique mining community built atop tailings from late 19th-century mining activities."

The complex also supported U.S. Forest Service activity.
