= Cyr, Montana =

- Census-designated place
- Location within Montana Location within the United States
- Coordinates: 47°0′27″N 114°34′48″W
- Country: United States
- State: Montana
- County: Mineral

Area
  - Total: 1.40 sq mi (3.63 km^{2})
  - Land: 1.40 sq mi (3.63 km^{2})
  - Water: 0 sq mi (0.00 km^{2})
- Elevation: 2,963 ft (903 m)

Population (2020)
  - Total: 63
  - Density: 45.0/sq mi (17.36/km^{2})
- Time zone: UTC-7 (Mountain (MST))
  - Summer (DST): UTC-6 (MDT)
- ZIP Code: 59820 (Alberton)
- Area code: 406
- FIPS code: 30-18850
- GNIS feature ID: 2806648

Cyr is an unincorporated community and census-designated place (CDP) in Mineral County, Montana, United States. As of the 2020 census, it had a population of 63. It is in the southeastern part of the county, in the valley of the Clark Fork. Interstate 90 crosses the community, with partial access from Exit 70. Alberton is 6 miles (10 km) to the east (upriver), while Superior, the Mineral county seat, is 22 miles (35 km) to the northwest (downriver).

Cyr was once a station on the Northern Pacific along the Clark Fork River west of Alberton. The station was named for the Cyr family, from whom the Northern Pacific obtained a right-of-way. Today, the bridge along old Highway 10 crosses the Clark Fork River at Cyr but nothing is left of the town. Cyr had a post office from 1908 (January 15) to 1914 (December 31). Mary Stringham was the first postmaster at Cyr.

== Demographics ==
Historical population
Census	Pop.	Note	%±
2020	63		—
U.S. Decennial Census
