= Gordon Hendrick =

American politician

Member of the Montana House of Representatives from the 14th district
- In office January 3, 2005 – January 7, 2013
- Succeeded by: Nicholas Schwaderer

Personal details
- Born: February 16, 1949 (age 77) Toronto, Ontario, Canada
- Party: Republican
- Education: University of Montana

Gordon Hendrick (February 16, 1949) is a former Republican member of the Montana Legislature. He was elected to represent House District 14, which includes the Superior area. Due to term limits in Montana, he was ineligible to run for re-election in 2012. He was succeeded by Republican candidate Nicholas Schwaderer in the 2013 legislature cycle.
