= Riverbend, Montana =

- Census-designated place
- Location in Mineral County and the state of Montana
- Coordinates: 47°9′51″N 114°50′54″W
- Country: United States
- State: Montana
- County: Mineral

Area
  - Total: 4.25 sq mi (11.01 km^{2})
  - Land: 3.94 sq mi (10.21 km^{2})
  - Water: 0.31 sq mi (0.80 km^{2})
- Elevation: 2,717 ft (828 m)

Population (2020)
  - Total: 455
  - Density: 115.4/sq mi (44.57/km^{2})
- Time zone: UTC-7 (Mountain (MST))
  - Summer (DST): UTC-6 (MDT)
- ZIP Code: 59872 (Superior)
- Area code: 406
- FIPS code: 30-63042
- GNIS feature ID: 2409185

Riverbend is an unincorporated community and census-designated place (CDP) in Mineral County, Montana, United States. The population was 455 at the 2020 census. The community uses the ZIP Code of neighboring Superior, 59872.

== Geography ==
Riverbend is located in east-central Mineral County at 47°09′51″N 114°50′54″W (47.164055, -114.848264). It is bordered to the northwest by the town of Superior, the county seat. Interstate 90 and the Clark Fork River pass through the community. Access to I-90 is from Exit 47 in Superior or from Exit 55 to the southeast of Riverbend.

According to the U.S. Census Bureau, the CDP has a total area of 4.25 square miles (11.0 km^{2}), of which 3.94 square miles (10.2 km^{2}) are land and 0.31 square miles (0.80 km^{2}), or 7.23%, are water.

== Demographics ==
Historical population
Census	Pop.	Note	%±
2000	442		—
2010	484		9.5%
2020	455		−6.0%
U.S. Decennial Census

As of the census of 2000, there were 442 people, 179 households, and 126 families residing in the CDP. The population density was 110.5 inhabitants per square mile (42.7/km^{2}). There were 216 housing units at an average density of 54.0 per square mile (20.8/km^{2}). The racial makeup of the CDP was 91.18% White, 0.23% African American, 4.52% Native American, 0.23% Asian, and 3.85% from two or more races. Hispanic or Latino of any race were 1.36% of the population.

There were 179 households, out of which 24.0% had children under the age of 18 living with them, 62.0% were married couples living together, 4.5% had a female householder with no husband present, and 29.6% were non-families. 22.3% of all households were made up of individuals, and 11.7% had someone living alone who was 65 years of age or older. The average household size was 2.47 and the average family size was 2.89.

In the CDP, the population was spread out, with 21.9% under the age of 18, 6.8% from 18 to 24, 22.4% from 25 to 44, 30.5% from 45 to 64, and 18.3% who were 65 years of age or older. The median age was 44 years. For every 100 females, there were 109.5 males. For every 100 females age 18 and over, there were 100.6 males.

The median income for a household in the CDP was $27,813, and the median income for a family was $29,844. Males had a median income of $21,719 versus $20,982 for females. The per capita income for the CDP was $13,672. About 3.2% of families and 9.5% of the population were below the poverty line, including 16.4% of those under age 18 and 5.0% of those age 65 or over.
