= Loop Creek =

Loop Creek may refer to:

- Loop Creek (Idaho), in the Chicago, Milwaukee, St. Paul and Pacific Railroad Company Historic District
- Loop Creek (West Virginia)
