= Nicholas Schwaderer =

American politician

Member of the Montana House of Representatives from the 14 district
- In office January 7, 2013 – January 2, 2017
- Preceded by: Gordon Hendrick
- Succeeded by: Denley Loge

Personal details
- Born: 1988 (age 37–38)
- Party: Republican
- Education: University of Plymouth
- Profession: Lawyer

Nicholas Schwaderer (born 1988) was a Republican member of the Montana Legislature. He was elected to House District 14, which represents the Superior, Montana area.

Prior to serving in the House, Nicholas earned a 2:1 in Law from the University of Plymouth. He has been active in limited-government and free market activism both statewide and nationally, including a fellowship with the Institute for Humane Studies in 2011.

In 2012, Schwaderer raised a total fund of $7,070 and won the election to the Montana House of Representatives.

In the term of 2013-2015 he was active on the Montana committee assignments.
