= Haugan Mountain =

Mountain in the state of Montana

- Location within Montana

Highest point
- Elevation: 5,166 ft (1,575 m) NGVD 29
- Coordinates: 47.38132°N 115.4407°W

Geography
- Location: Mineral County, Montana, U.S.
- Parent range: Bitterroot Range
- Topo map(s): USGS Haugan, MT

Haugan Mountain is a summit in Mineral County, Montana at 5,166 feet (1,575 m). It is located just south of Interstate 90 and 2.1 miles (3.4 km) from the community of Haugan, Montana.
