= Bouchard Lake =

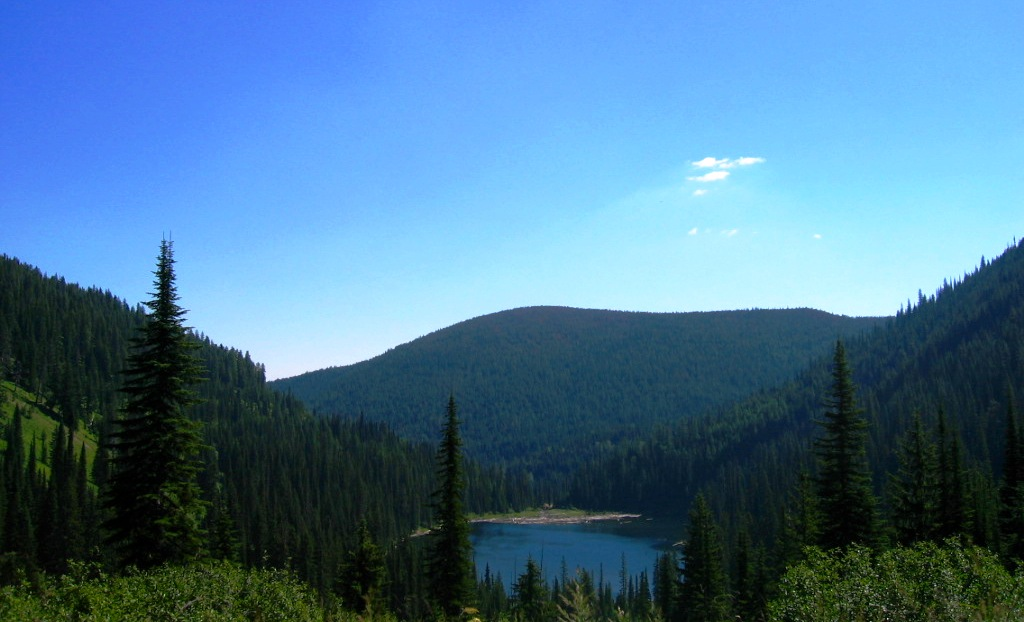
- Bouchard Lake near Bald Hill

- Location in Montana
- Location: Mineral County, Montana, United States
- Coordinates: 47°13′14″N 115°00′02″W
- Type: Natural/Fresh Water Lake
- Primary outflows: outlet northwards to Clark Fork River
- Basin countries: United States
- Max. length: 2,460 ft (750 m)
- Max. width: 315 ft (96 m)
- Surface area: 16.2 acres (6.6 ha)
- Surface elevation: 2,943 ft (897 m)

Bouchard Lake is an L-shaped body of water covering sixteen acres in Mineral County, Montana in the United States. The lake is located five miles northwest of Superior, Montana in the valley of the Clark Fork River.

== Geology ==
Bouchard Lake has given its name to the Bouchard Formation, a geologic unit "composed principally of interbedded micaceous quartzite and quartzose argillite that conformably overlies the Sloway formation" exposed near the lake.
