= Superior School (Superior, Montana) =

- U.S. National Register of Historic Places
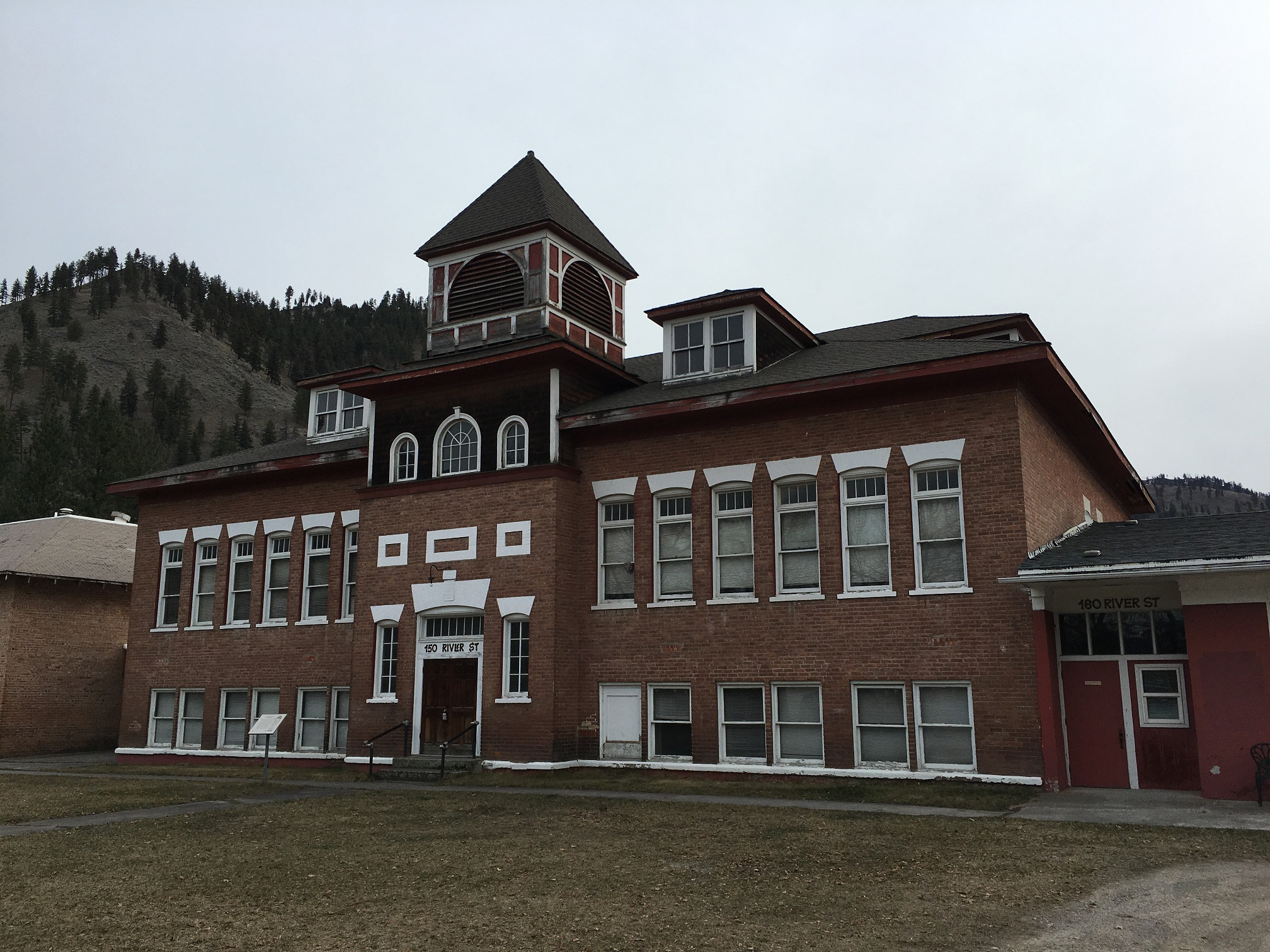

- Location within Montana Location within the United States
- Location: River Road, approximately 25 miles (40 km) north of Interstate 90, in Superior, Montana
- Coordinates: 47.194923°N 114.890301°W
- Area: 2 acres (0.81 ha)
- Built: 1915-16
- Built by: Augustine, Charles
- Architectural style: Colonial Revival, vernacular
- NRHP reference No.: 97000253
- Added to NRHP: March 21, 1997

The Superior School in Superior in Mineral County, Montana was built in 1915–16. It was listed on the National Register of Historic Places in 1997. The listed 2 acres (0.81 ha) property included two contributing buildings.

It is a raised two-and-a-half-story brick building in a combination of vernacular Colonial Revival styling. It was built by local contractor Charles Augustine.
