= Mineral County Airport =

- IATA: none; ICAO: none; FAA LID: 9S4

Summary
- Airport type: Public
- Owner: Mineral County
- Serves: Superior, Montana
- Elevation AMSL: 2,787 ft / 849 m
- Coordinates: 47°10′06″N 114°51′13″W
- Interactive map of Mineral County Airport

Runways
Direction	Length		Surface
Direction	ft	m	Surface
12/30	3,450	1,052	Asphalt

Statistics (2013)
- Aircraft operations: 4,000
- Based aircraft: 12
- Source: Federal Aviation Administration

Mineral County Airport (FAA LID: 9S4) is a county-owned public-use airport located two nautical miles (3.7 km) southeast of the central business district of Superior, a town in Mineral County, Montana, United States. According to the FAA's National Plan of Integrated Airport Systems for 2011–2015, it is categorized as a general aviation facility.

== Facilities and aircraft ==
Mineral County Airport covers an area of 70 acres (28 ha) at an elevation of 2,787 feet (849 m) above mean sea level. It has one runway designated 12/30 with an asphalt surface measuring 3,450 by 75 feet (1,052 x 23 m).

For the 12-month period ending 8 August 2013, the airport had 4,000 aircraft operations, an average of 11 per day, all of which were general aviation. At that time there were 12 aircraft based at this airport, all of which were single-engine.

== See also ==
- List of airports in Montana
