= Brinks House =

Historic 1912 house in western Montana

- U.S. National Register of Historic Places
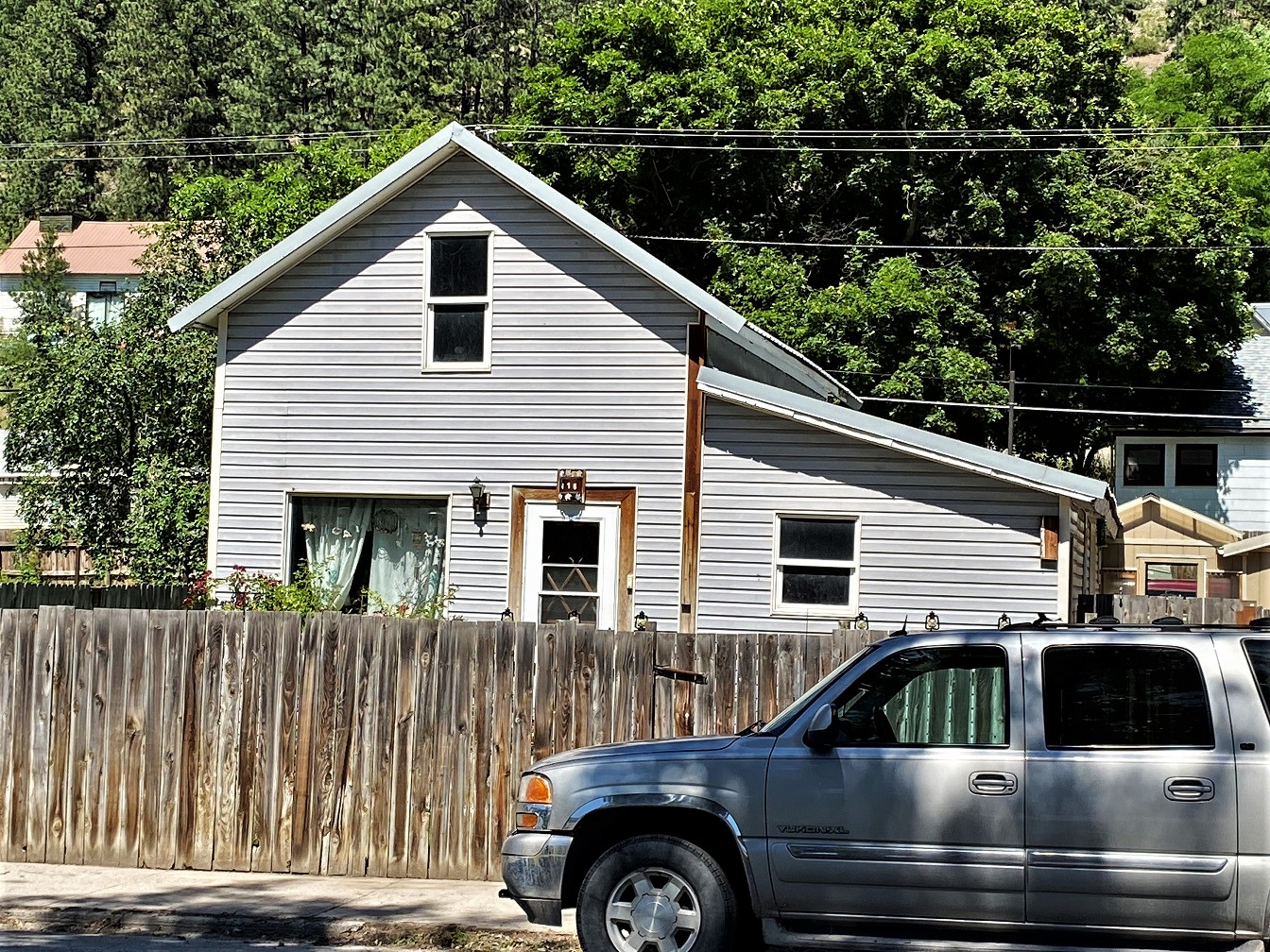
- Brinks House in 2020

- Location within Montana Location within the United States
- Location: 416 Railroad St. Alberton, Montana
- Coordinates: 47°0′14″N 114°28′42″W
- Area: less than one acre
- Built: 1912
- Architectural style: gable front
- MPS: Alberton MPS
- NRHP reference No.: 96001601
- Added to NRHP: January 13, 1997

The Brinks House at 416 Railroad Street in Alberton in Mineral County, Montana was built in 1912. It was listed on the National Register of Historic Places in 1997.

It is one of few surviving vernacular gable-front houses which were common during Alberton's early development period from 1908 to 1917.

The parcel was at one point owned by John McCarthy, a real estate agent, but the first owners of the house were E.P. and Ella Brinks. E.P. Brinks was a telegraph operator for the Milwaukee Road. Brinks happened to provide Alberton with its primary water supply, because he separately bought a water system of the Milwaukee Land Company and private springs and combined them, then sold the system to the town.
