= De Borgia Schoolhouse =

- U.S. National Register of Historic Places
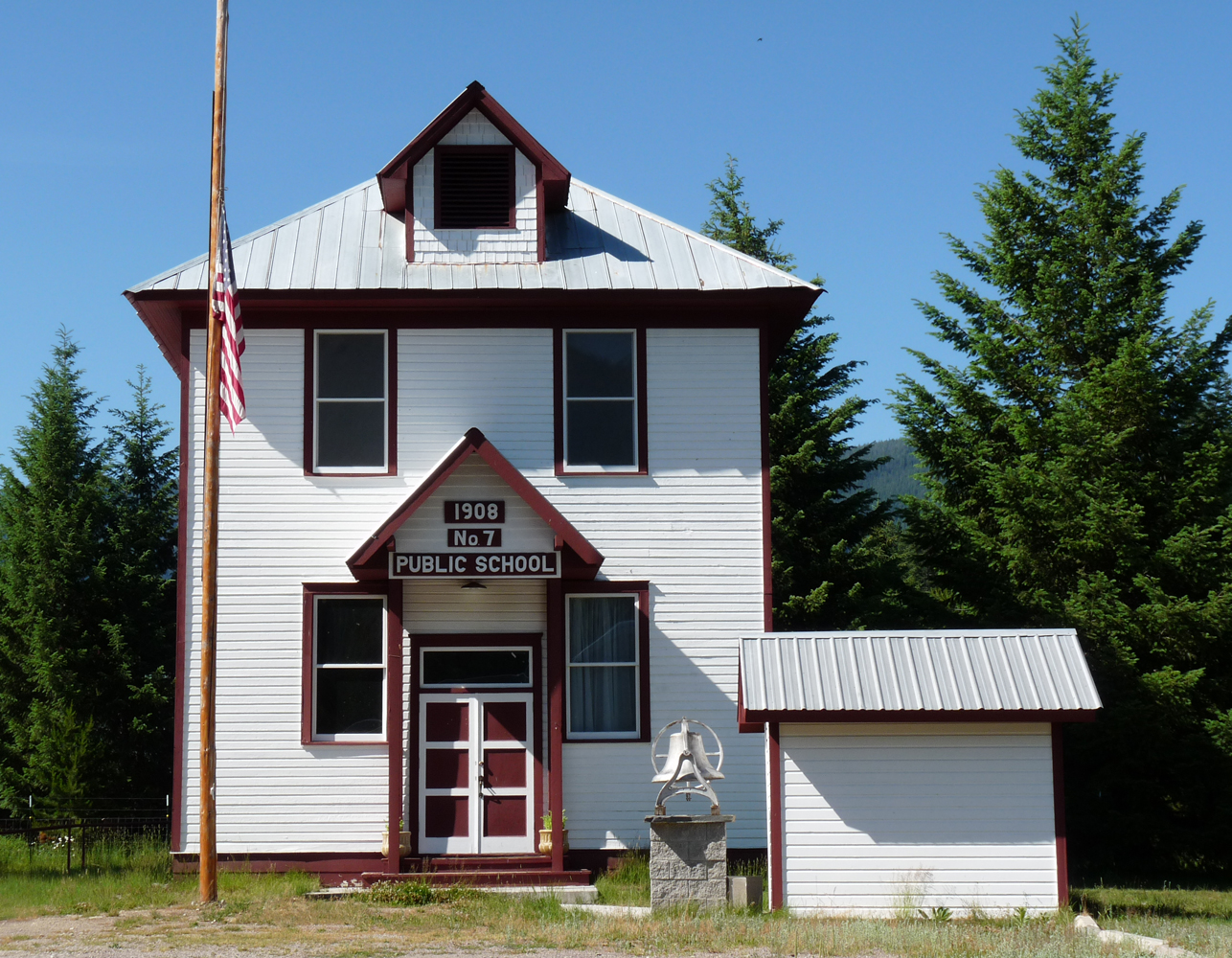
- South elevation of De Borgia Schoolhouse with flag pole and bell, De Borgia, Montana

- Location within Montana
- Location: De Borgia, Montana
- Coordinates: 47°22′41.1″N 115°20′54.54″W
- Built: 1908
- NRHP reference No.: 79001405
- Added to NRHP: December 27, 1979

De Borgia Schoolhouse is a two-story wood-frame school located in De Borgia, Montana, United States which was listed on the National Register of Historic Places on December 27, 1979. Constructed in 1908, the schoolhouse was the first two-story building built in the West End of Mineral County and is the only building now standing in De Borgia to survive the Great Fire of 1910. The school closed in 1956, becoming a community center for the town.
