= Point of Rocks Historic Transportation Corridor =

- U.S. National Register of Historic Places
- U.S. Historic district
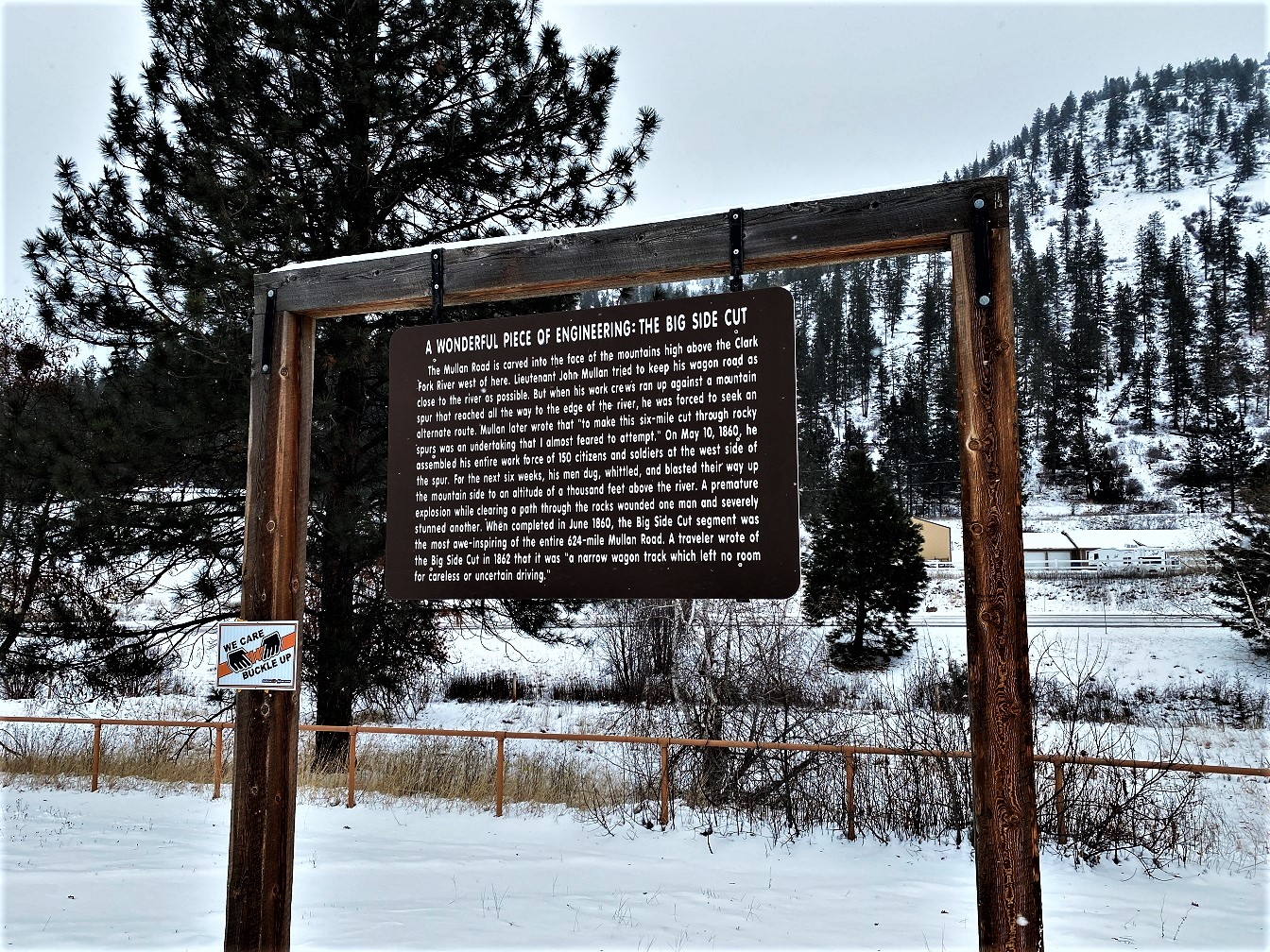

- Location within Montana
- Location: Alberton vicinity (2 mi. W. of Alberton), Mineral County, Montana
- Coordinates: 47.007930°N 114.549116°W
- Area: 55 acres (22 ha)
- NRHP reference No.: 09000683
- Added to NRHP: September 4, 2009

The Point of Rocks Historic Transportation Corridor in Mineral County, Montana is a historic district including portions of the historic Mullan Road and the Milwaukee Road Railroad.

The district was listed on the U.S. National Register of Historic Places on September 4, 2009. The listing was announced as the featured listing in the National Park Service's weekly list of September 11, 2009.

It is located two miles west of Alberton, Montana.
