= Alberton station =

Alberton
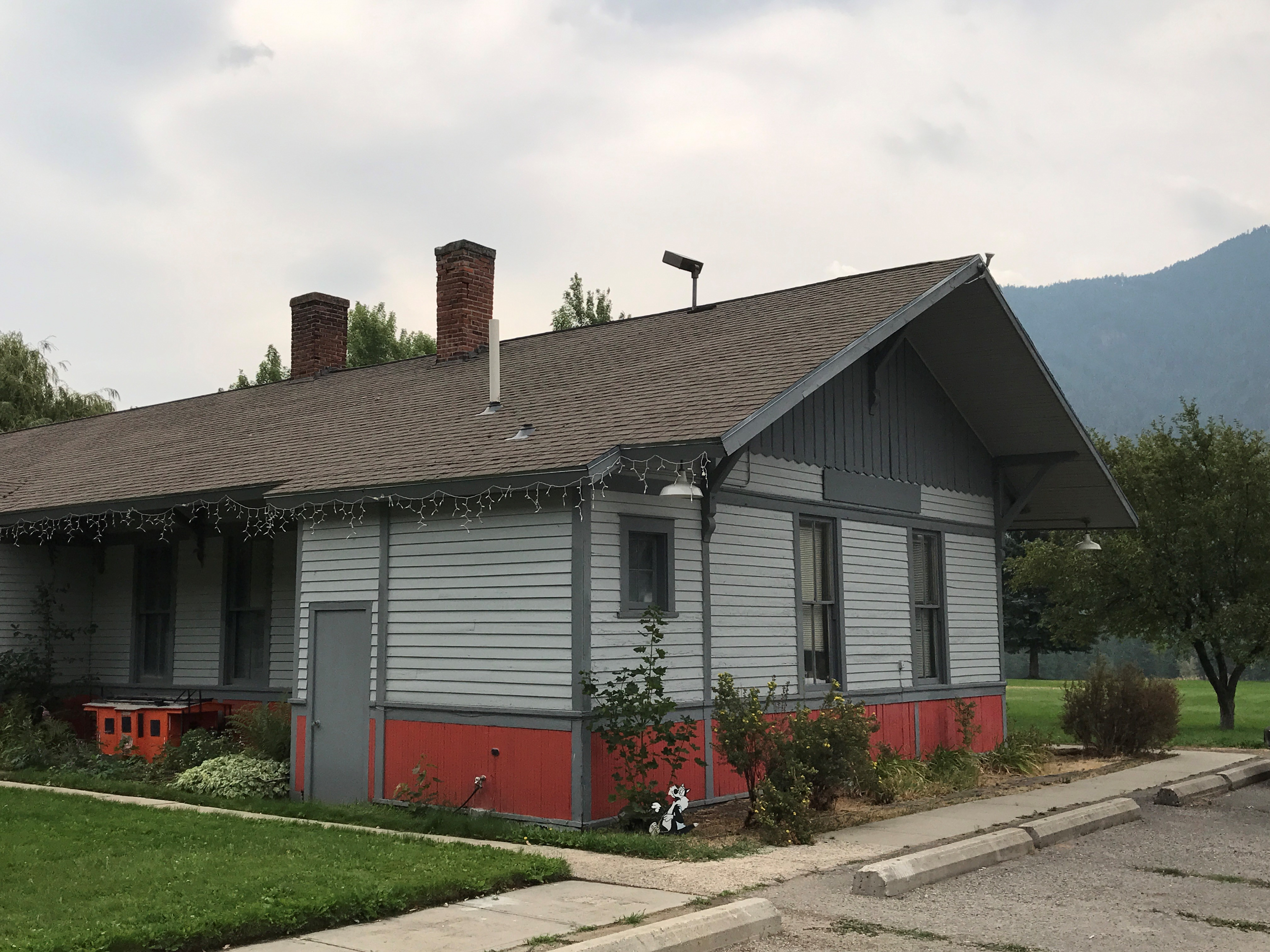
- Alberton station in August 2017.

General information
- Location: 701 Railroad Street, Alberton, Montana 59820
- System: Former Milwaukee Road passenger rail station

Construction
- Platform levels: 1

History
- Opened: 1908
- Closed: 1980
- Electrified: 1916-1974

Services
| Preceding station | Milwaukee Road | Following station |
|---|---|---|
| St. Regis toward Seattle or Tacoma | Main Line | Huson toward Chicago |

Other services
1908-1961 passenger service
- Milwaukee Railroad Depot
- U.S. National Register of Historic Places
- Location within Montana Location within the United States
- Location: 701 Railroad St; Alberton, Montana
- Coordinates: 47°0′10″N 114°28′30″W
- Built: 1908
- Architect: Chicago, Milwaukee and St Paul Railway
- Architectural style: Craftsman
- MPS: Alberton MPS
- NRHP reference No.: 96001603
- Added to NRHP: January 13, 1997
Location

The Milwaukee Railroad Depot in Alberton, Montana was built by the Chicago, Milwaukee and St. Paul Railway (a.k.a. Milwaukee Road) in 1908, during its Pacific Extension from Mobridge, South Dakota to Tacoma, Washington from 1906 to 1909. The depot is a rectangular one-story wood-frame building constructed in the Craftsman style.

When the Milwaukee Road built its transcontinental line, it placed a division point at Alberton. In addition to the depot, there were also a roundhouse, turntable and locomotive repair shops. The depot became the center of the commercial district of the town and the railroad was the town's major employer.

After the railroad was electrified in 1916, the roundhouse and turntable were removed.

When the railroad went bankrupt in the 1980s, the depot was sold to the Town of Alberton and is now used as a community center.

The depot was listed in the National Register because of its architecture and association with The Milwaukee Road and the development of railroads in Montana.
