= Chicago, Milwaukee, St. Paul and Pacific Railroad Company Historic District =

Historic district in Idaho, United States

- U.S. National Register of Historic Places
- U.S. Historic district
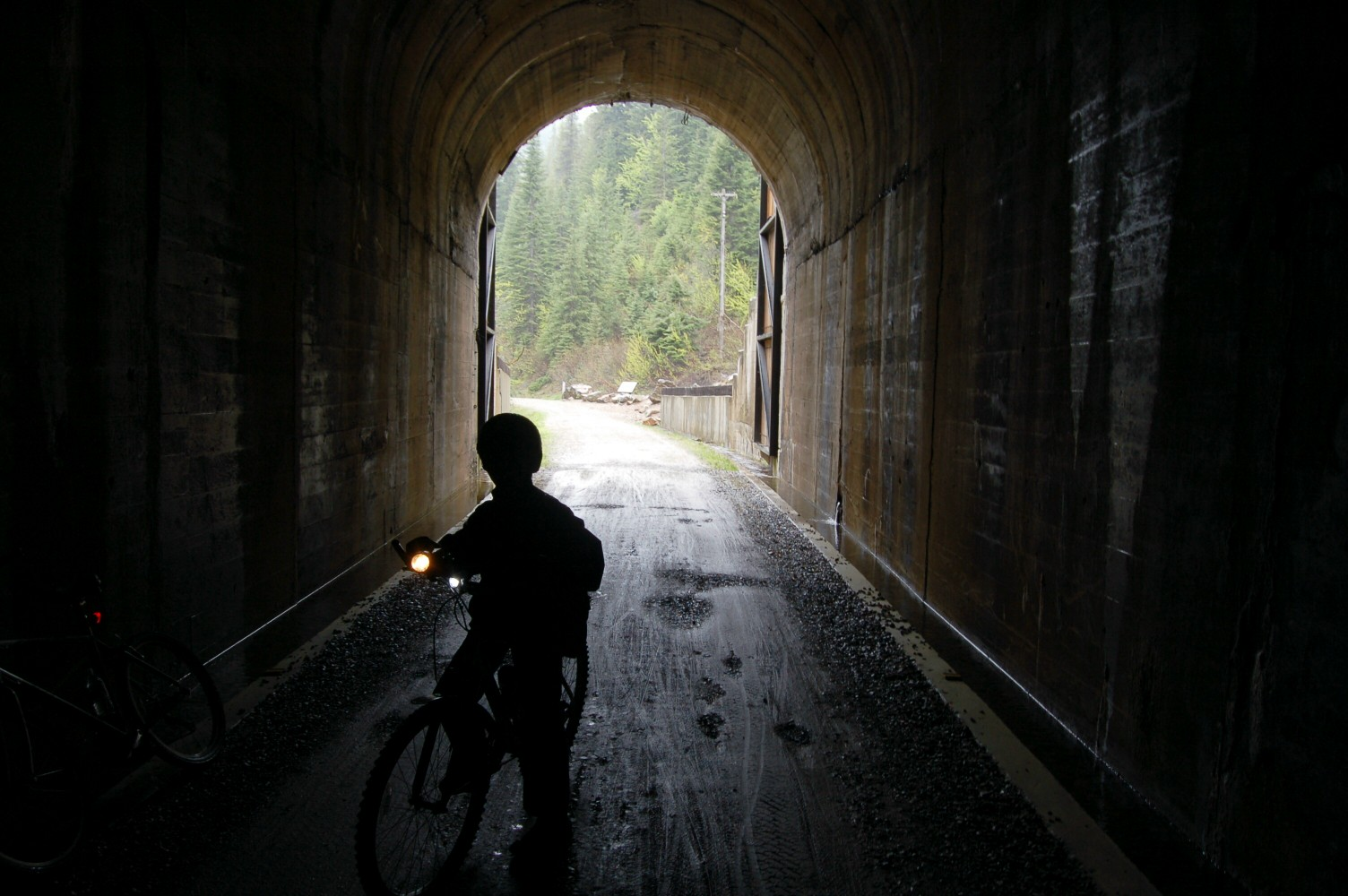

- Location within Idaho Location within the United States
- Nearest city: Avery, Idaho
- Coordinates: 1st Tunnel: 47.360969°N 115.649586°W, 2nd Tunnel: 47°21′46″N 115°39′30″W * 3rd or Long Tunnel: East Portal 47.396507°N 115.635034°W West Portal 47.381295°N 115.666729°W
- Area: 48 acres (Montana); 655 acres (Idaho) linear distance: 14.5 mi
- Built: 1909
- Architect: Chicago, Milwaukee, St. Paul and Pacific Railroad
- NRHP reference No.: 00001269
- Added to NRHP: October 26, 2000

The Chicago, Milwaukee, St. Paul and Pacific Railroad Company Historic District consists of the historic right-of-way of the Chicago, Milwaukee, St. Paul and Pacific Railroad (also known as The Milwaukee Road) in the Bitterroot Mountains from East Portal, Montana (near St. Regis), to the mouth of Loop Creek, Idaho (near Pearson), a distance of 14.5 miles (23.3 km). The district was once part of the railroad's mainline from Chicago, Illinois to Tacoma, Washington.

== History ==
The Milwaukee Road was the United States' last transcontinental railroad. The Milwaukee Road felt that in order to compete with the Northern Pacific Railroad and the Great Northern Railway, it had to construct a rail line from the Midwest to the Pacific Coast. In 1906, construction commenced on the "Pacific Extension". It roughly paralleled the two earlier railroads. The route was surveyed in 1906. The railroad decided to cross the Bitterroot Mountains at St. Paul Pass. This pass was chosen because of the stands of marketable white pine timber and also because there was no other competing railroad nearby. From the pass the railroad followed the St. Joe River to Avery, Idaho.

The construction of this segment of the Pacific Extension was the most expensive, due to the remote location and rugged terrain. The railroad built 14 tunnels and 26 bridges. The tunnel at St. Paul Pass was 8,771 feet (2,673 m) long.

Beginning in 1914, the railroad electrified its mountain segments. Substations for electric power were built at East Portal and at Avery. Catenary lines were placed over the tracks. In 1974, the railroad ceased electric operations.

In 1980, the railroad went bankrupt and embargoed its line west of Miles City, Montana. The right-of-way in Idaho was sold off. In 1985, the US Government purchased the portion from Avery to East Portal. From Avery to Loop Creek, the Forest Service built an access road. The portion from Loop Creek to East Portal was made into a bike trail, known as the Route of the Hiawatha Trail.

== Legacy ==
The right-of-way still retains its setting and integrity; the bridges and tunnels are still standing. In places the poles that supported the overhead wires are still in place, as are flanger signs. In addition, the district may be able to help archaeologists learn more about the early construction of the railroad and the crews that did the work. For these reasons, the 14.5 miles (23.3 km) of the Milwaukee Road's Pacific Extension through the Bitterroot Mountains were listed in the National Register of Historic Places.

== See also ==
Lookout Pass Ski and Recreation Area
