= Wilson House (Alberton, Montana) =

Historic house in Montana, United States

- U.S. National Register of Historic Places
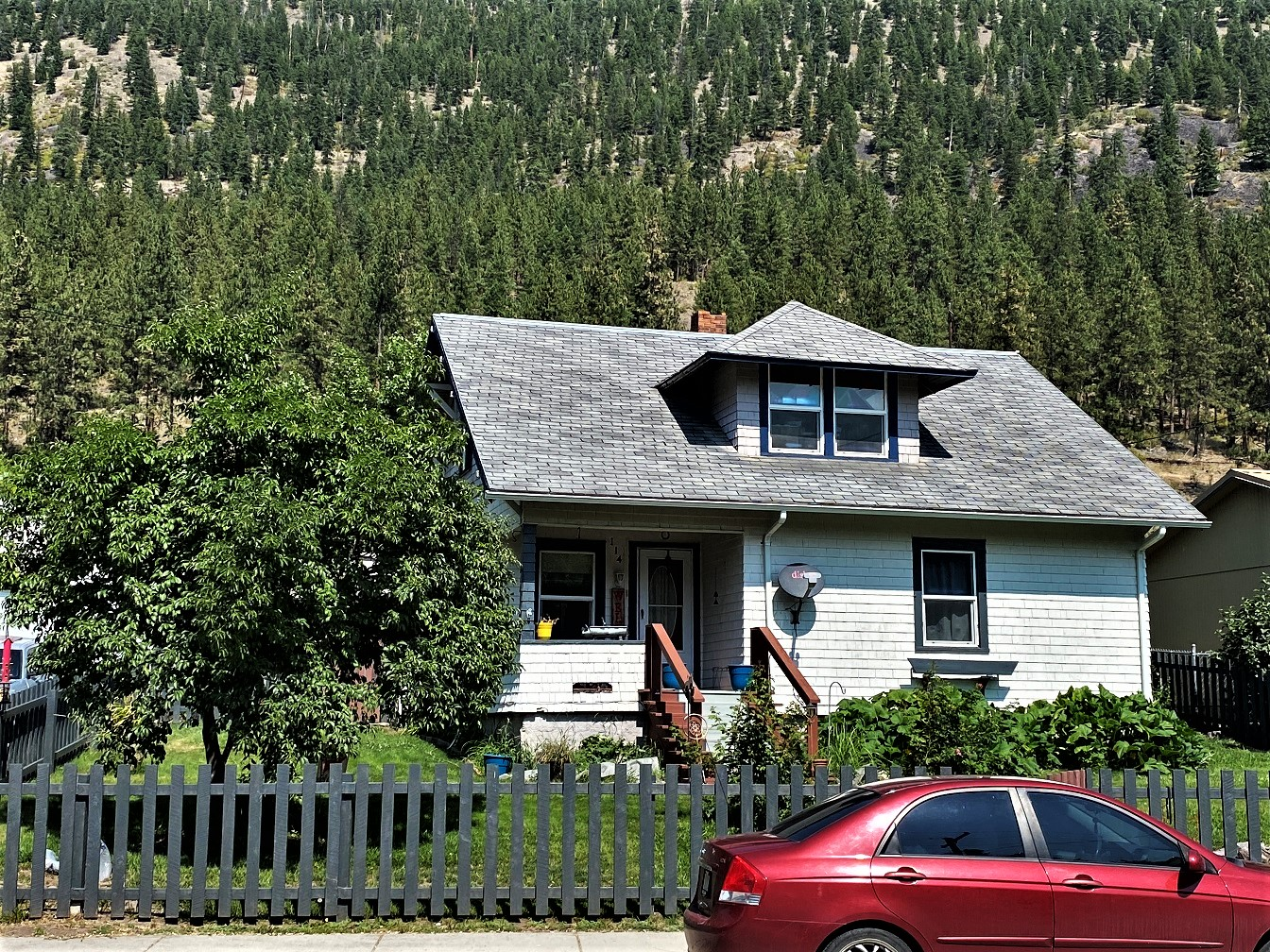

- Location within Montana Location within the United States
- Location: 114 Adams St., Alberton, Montana
- Coordinates: 47°00′06″N 114°28′14″W
- Area: less than one acre
- Built: 1914
- Built by: Mr. Gress
- Architectural style: Bungalow/craftsman
- MPS: Alberton MPS
- NRHP reference No.: 96001606
- Added to NRHP: January 13, 1997

The Wilson House in Alberton, Montana, located at 114 Adams St., was built in 1914. It was listed on the National Register of Historic Places in 1997.

It is a one-and-a-half-story Craftsman-style house which was first owned by railroad conductor Clarence E. Wilson and his wife Catherine.
