= Haugan, Montana =

Haugan, Montana Waugan
- Census-designated place
- Interactive map of Haugan, Montana
- Coordinates: 47°23′00″N 115°23′59″W
- Country: United States
- State: Montana
- County: Mineral
- Named after: H. G. Haugan

Area
  - Total: 0.64 sq mi (1.7 km^{2})
  - Land: 0.64 sq mi (1.7 km^{2})
  - Water: 0.00 sq mi (0 km^{2})
- Elevation: 3,143 ft (958 m)

Population (2020)
  - Total: 58
  - Density: 90.77/sq mi (35.05/km^{2})
- Time zone: UTC-7 (MST)
  - Summer (DST): UTC-6 (MDT)
- ZIP Code: 59842
- Area Code: 406
- FIPS code: 30-34825
- GNIS feature ID: 2806649

Haugan (also Waugan) is an unincorporated community and census-designated place in Mineral County, Montana, United States. Haugan is situated 16 miles (26 km) east of the Idaho border and 90 miles (140 km) west of Missoula on Interstate 90 at the Haugan Exit #16. The St. Regis River flows through the community. As of the 2020 census, the population of Haugan was 58.

== Demographics ==
Historical population
Census	Pop.	Note	%±
2020	58		—
U.S. Decennial Census

== History ==
Haugan was named for H. G. Haugan, Land Commissioner of the Chicago, Milwaukee & St. Paul Railway. Haugan was established and maintained to serve as a pusher station for the Milwaukee Road railroad trains ascending the Bitterroot Range of the Rocky Mountains.

Haugan was one of several area towns to be destroyed during the Great Fire of 1910. Haugan had a post office for nearly seventy years in the twentieth century. Opened on March 25, 1911, the post office closed on August 31, 1944, only to reopen four years later. This second post office operated from June 16, 1948, to July 22, 1983.

== Geography ==
=== Nearby ===
Haugan is surrounded by the Lolo National Forest and is the site of the Savenac Nursery Historic District. The nearby Haugan/Randolph Creek Loop Snowmobile Trail offers cross-country skiing, snowmobiling and other winter sport. Also nearby is the summit of Haugan Mountain.

The community is most commonly known for its Silver Dollars tourist area. Billboards and signs telling drivers the distance are seen on Interstate 90 around western Montana and northern Idaho.

=== Climate ===
Climate data for Haugan, Montana, 1991–2020 normals, extremes 1912–present
Month	Jan	Feb	Mar	Apr	May	Jun	Jul	Aug	Sep	Oct	Nov	Dec	Year
Record high °F (°C)	57 (14)	63 (17)	76 (24)	87 (31)	94 (34)	98 (37)	103 (39)	107 (42)	100 (38)	91 (33)	70 (21)	55 (13)	107 (42)
Mean daily maximum °F (°C)	31.0 (−0.6)	36.5 (2.5)	44.1 (6.7)	53.6 (12.0)	65.4 (18.6)	71.0 (21.7)	84.4 (29.1)	82.8 (28.2)	72.4 (22.4)	53.3 (11.8)	38.1 (3.4)	30.5 (−0.8)	55.3 (12.9)
Daily mean °F (°C)	24.0 (−4.4)	27.5 (−2.5)	33.5 (0.8)	40.5 (4.7)	49.8 (9.9)	55.4 (13.0)	63.6 (17.6)	61.9 (16.6)	53.7 (12.1)	41.5 (5.3)	31.2 (−0.4)	24.2 (−4.3)	42.2 (5.7)
Mean daily minimum °F (°C)	17.0 (−8.3)	18.4 (−7.6)	22.9 (−5.1)	27.3 (−2.6)	34.2 (1.2)	39.7 (4.3)	42.8 (6.0)	41.0 (5.0)	35.1 (1.7)	29.8 (−1.2)	24.4 (−4.2)	17.9 (−7.8)	29.2 (−1.5)
Record low °F (°C)	−47 (−44)	−49 (−45)	−27 (−33)	−15 (−26)	14 (−10)	20 (−7)	24 (−4)	17 (−8)	5 (−15)	−13 (−25)	−28 (−33)	−41 (−41)	−49 (−45)
Average precipitation inches (mm)	5.28 (134)	3.48 (88)	3.63 (92)	2.45 (62)	2.57 (65)	2.53 (64)	1.01 (26)	1.17 (30)	1.76 (45)	3.51 (89)	4.49 (114)	5.11 (130)	36.99 (939)
Source 1: NOAA
Source 2: National Weather Service
