= Chadwick House (Alberton, Montana) =

Historic house in Montana, United States

- U.S. National Register of Historic Places
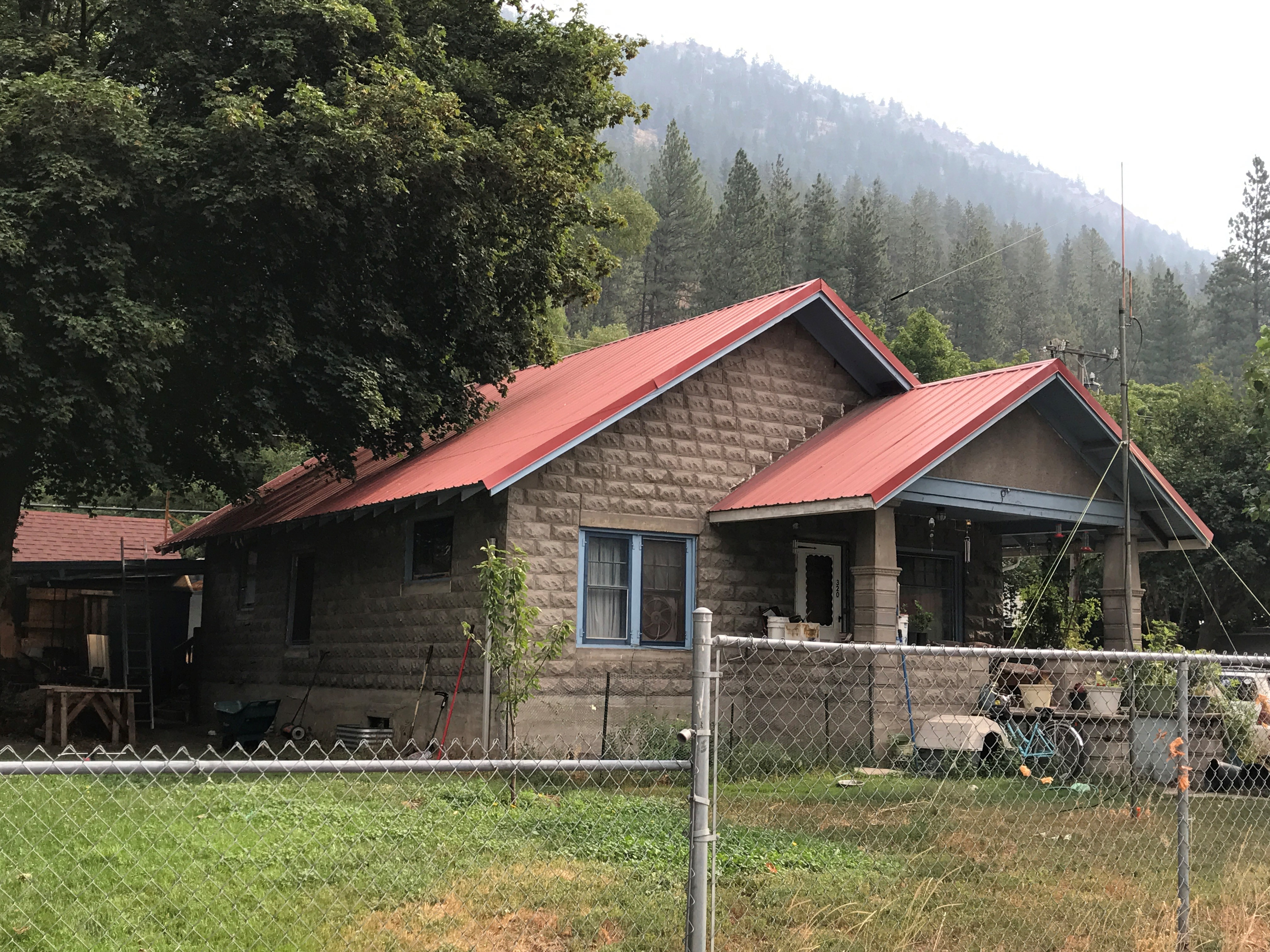

- Location within Montana Location within the United States
- Location: 320 Railroad St., Alberton, Montana
- Coordinates: 47°00′15″N 114°28′45″W
- Area: less than one acre
- Built: 1922
- Architectural style: Bungalow/craftsman
- MPS: Alberton MPS
- NRHP reference No.: 96001602
- Added to NRHP: January 13, 1997

The Chadwick House in Alberton, Montana, located at 320 Railroad St., was built in 1922. It was listed on the National Register of Historic Places in 1997.

It is a single family Bungalow-style house with a wood, single-car garage and carport which is a second contributing building.

It was identified as Kern House in its NRHP application photos.
