= De Borgia, Montana =

- Census-designated place
- Nickname: West End
- Location in Mineral County and the state of Montana
- Coordinates: 47°22′25″N 115°20′22″W
- Country: United States
- State: Montana
- County: Mineral

Area
  - Total: 2.74 sq mi (7.09 km^{2})
  - Land: 2.74 sq mi (7.09 km^{2})
  - Water: 0 sq mi (0.00 km^{2})
- Elevation: 3,639 ft (1,109 m)

Population (2020)
  - Total: 91
  - Density: 33.3/sq mi (12.84/km^{2})
- Time zone: UTC-7 (Mountain (MST))
  - Summer (DST): UTC-6 (MDT)
- ZIP code: 59830
- Area code: 406
- FIPS code: 30-19675
- GNIS feature ID: 2408646

De Borgia is an unincorporated community and census-designated place (CDP) in Mineral County, Montana, United States. The population was 91 at the 2020 census.

The town derives its name from the St. Regis River, which was named after Saint Regis DeBorgia, a Catholic missionary. The post office was established in 1900.

== Geography ==
De Borgia is located in northwestern Mineral County on the north side of Interstate 90, with access via exit 18. The St. Regis River passes to the south of the highway, flowing southeasterly to join the Clark Fork at St. Regis. Deer Creek flows north to join the St. Regis River at De Borgia and Twin Creek flows south into the community.

According to the U.S. Census Bureau, the De Borgia CDP has a total area of 2.7 square miles (7.0 km^{2}), all land.

=== Climate ===
This climatic region is typified by large seasonal temperature differences, with warm to hot (and often humid) summers and cold (sometimes severely cold) winters. According to the Köppen Climate Classification system, De Borgia has a humid continental climate, abbreviated "Dfb" on climate maps.

== Demographics ==
Historical population
Census	Pop.	Note	%±
2000	69		—
2010	78		13.0%
2020	91		16.7%
U.S. Decennial Census

As of the census of 2000, there were 69 people, 34 households, and 24 families residing in the CDP. The population density was 12.1 inhabitants per square mile (4.7/km^{2}). There were 42 housing units at an average density of 7.4 per square mile (2.9/km^{2}). The racial makeup of the CDP was 95.65% White, and 4.35% from two or more races.

There were 34 households, out of which 11.8% had children under the age of 18 living with them, 64.7% were married couples living together, and 29.4% were non-families. 26.5% of all households were made up of individuals, and 8.8% had someone living alone who was 65 years of age or older. The average household size was 2.03 and the average family size was 2.33.

In the CDP, the population was spread out, with 11.6% under the age of 18, 4.3% from 18 to 24, 20.3% from 25 to 44, 27.5% from 45 to 64, and 36.2% who were 65 years of age or older. The median age was 54 years. For every 100 females, there were 109.1 males. For every 100 females age 18 and over, there were 117.9 males.

The median income for a household in the CDP was $22,917, and the median income for a family was $27,857. Males had a median income of $10,000 versus $0 for females. The per capita income for the CDP was $12,791. There were 9.1% of families and 19.7% of the population living below the poverty line, including no under eighteens and 8.3% of those over 64.
