= Natural Pier Bridge =

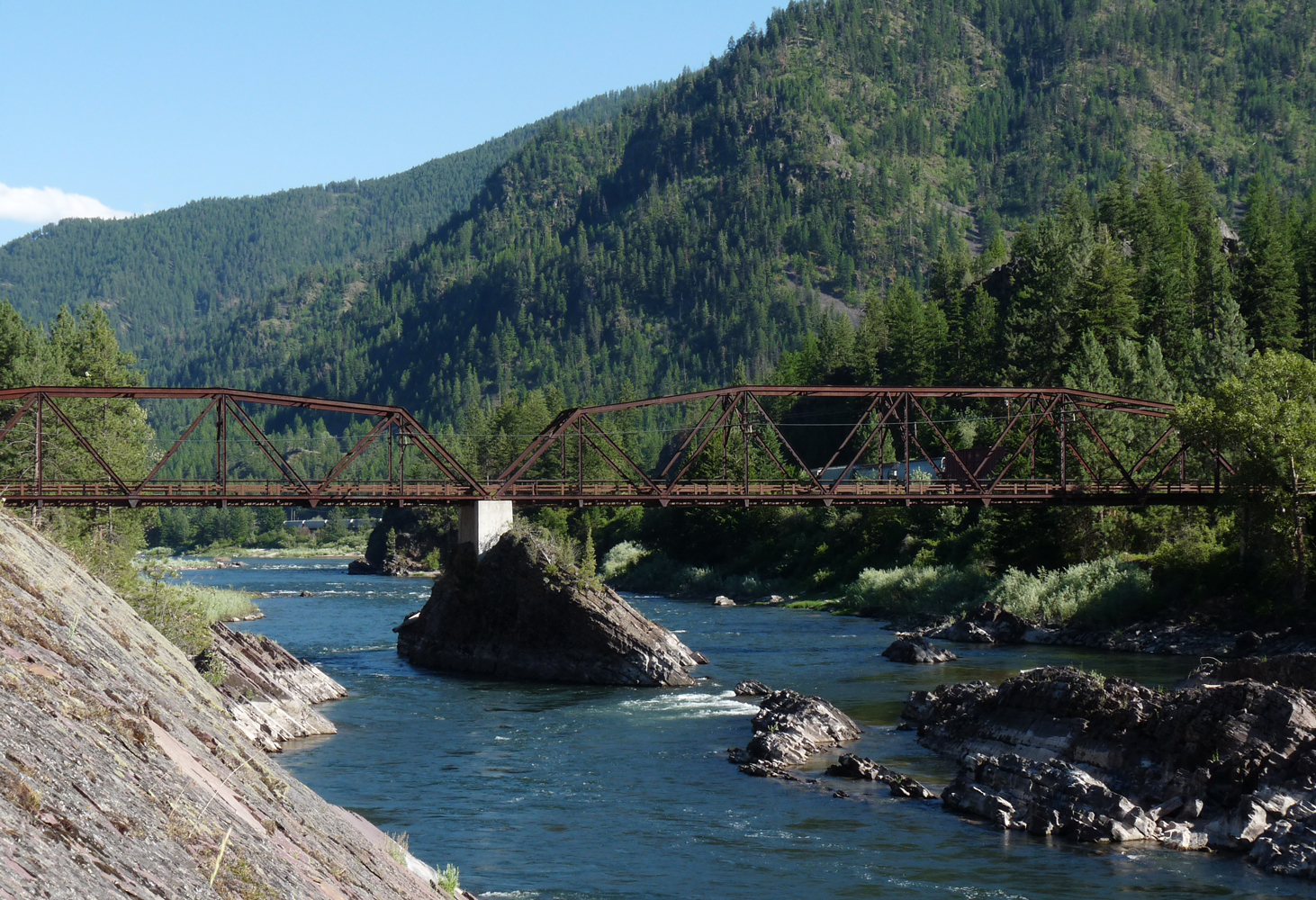
- Natural Pier Bridge, viewed from downstream.
- Coordinates: 47°00′50.1912″N 114°30′27.5112″W
- Carries: Motor vehicles
- Crosses: Clark Fork River
- Locale: near Alberton, Montana

Characteristics
- Design: truss
- Material: Steel, concrete, and wood
- Total length: 374 feet (114 m)
- Width: 16 feet (4.9 m)
- Longest span: 175 feet (53 m)
- No. of spans: 2

History
- Constructed by: Lord Construction Company
- Construction cost: US$100,000

Statistics
- Toll: Free
- Natural Pier Bridge
- U.S. National Register of Historic Places
- Location within Montana
- Location: near Alberton, Montana
- Built: 1917
- NRHP reference No.: 09001182
- Added to NRHP: January 4, 2010

Location
- Interactive map of Natural Pier Bridge

Natural Pier Bridge is a steel Warren through truss bridge spanning the Clark Fork river located 1 mile (1.6 km) west of Alberton, Montana, United States, which incorporates a natural rock outcrop as anchorage for a pier. It was nominated to the National Register of Historic Places as part of a related group of historic Montana bridges known as Montana's Historic Steel Truss Bridges and achieved listing on January 4, 2010. Built in 1917 by the Lord Construction Company of Missoula, Montana, it is one of only a few remaining bridges of its type in the state, and of those it is the only one that incorporates a natural feature in its design.
