= Methodist Church of Alberton =

Historic church in Montana, United States

- U.S. National Register of Historic Places
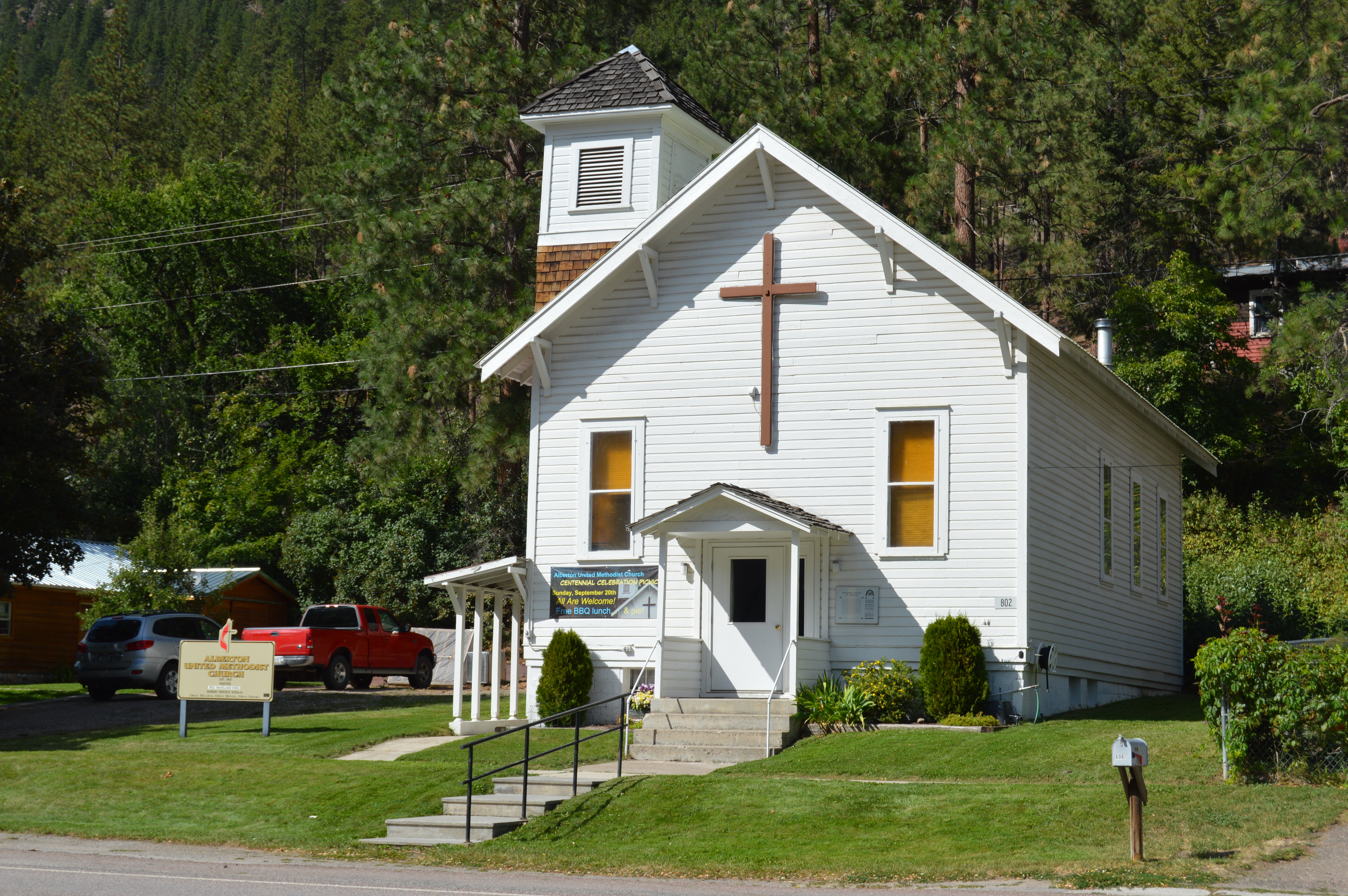

- Location within Montana Location within the United States
- Location: 802 Railroad St., Alberton, Montana
- Coordinates: 47°00′10″N 114°28′26″W
- Area: less than one acre
- Built: 1912
- Architectural style: gable front church
- MPS: Alberton MPS
- NRHP reference No.: 96001604
- Added to NRHP: January 13, 1997

The Methodist Church of Alberton, located at 802 Railroad St. in Alberton, Montana, was built in 1912. It was listed on the National Register of Historic Places in 1997.

It is a one-story gable-front church. It was deemed notable as "This simple wood frame church building exhibits the design and construction characteristics typical of historic churches of the Methodist denomination in Montana."
