= Bestwick's Market =

- U.S. National Register of Historic Places
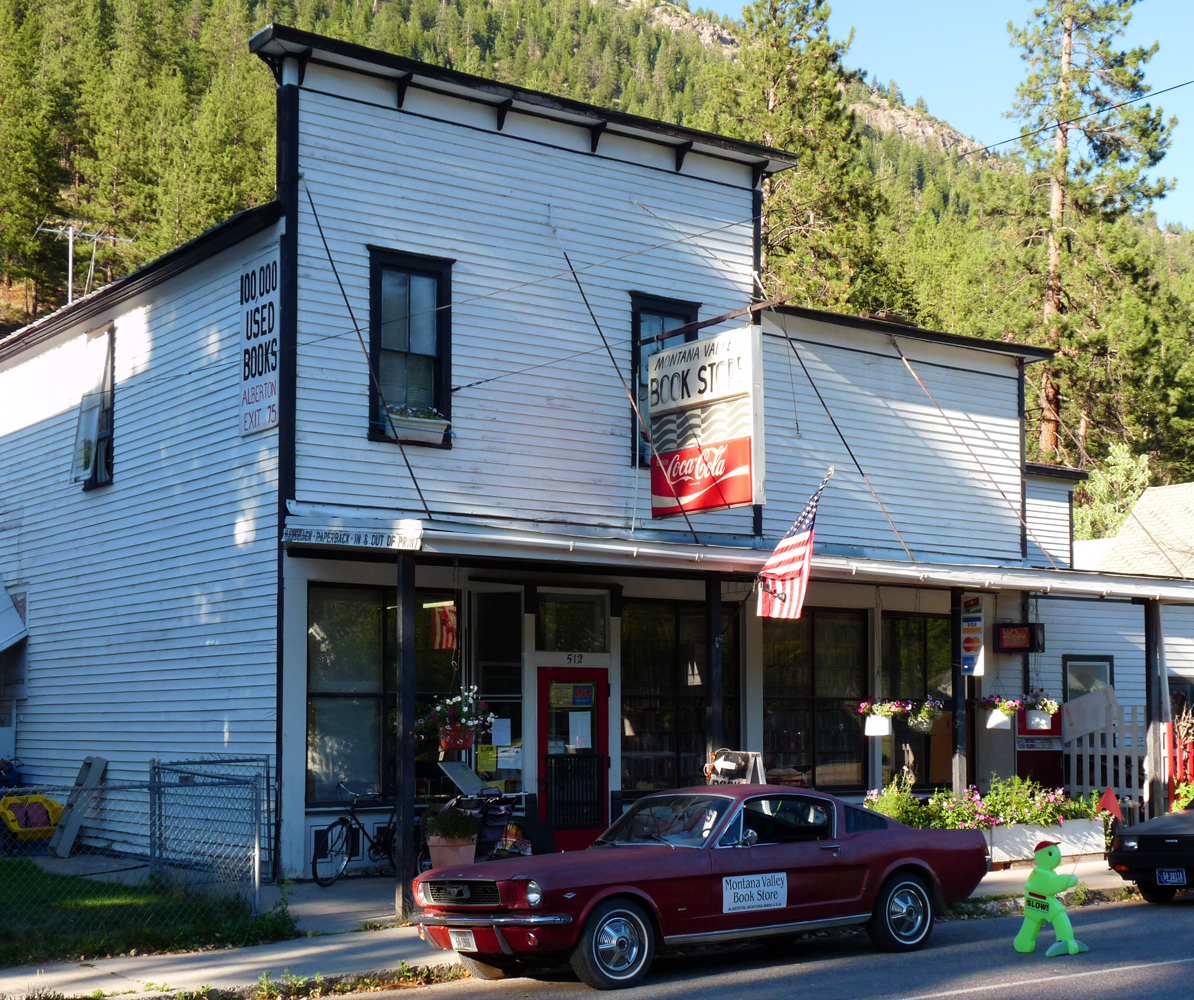
- False-front storefront of Bestwick's Market, Alberton, Montana

- Location within Montana
- Location: Alberton, Montana
- Coordinates: 47°0′11.70″N 114°28′41.40″W
- Built: 1910, 1915, 1925
- Architectural style: wood-frame false-front commercial
- NRHP reference No.: 96001600
- Added to NRHP: January 13, 1997

Bestwick's Market is a wood-framed false-fronted commercial building located in Alberton, Montana, United States which was listed on the National Register of Historic Places on January 13, 1997. Constructed in 1910 with additions in 1915 and 1925, the building housed Bestwick's Market from 1912 to the late 1950s. The building has housed the Montana Valley Book Store since the 1970s.
