= Surveyor Lake =

Surveyor Lake may refer to:

- Surveyor Lake (Algoma District), Ontario, Canada
- Surveyor Lake (Nipissing District), Ontario, Canada
