= East Portal, Montana =

Unincorporated community in Montana, U.S.

Coordinates: 47°23′50″N 115°38′07″W

East Portal is an unincorporated community in Mineral County, in the U.S. state of Montana.

== History ==
East Portal was named from the fact the town site was located near the eastern portal of the St. Paul Pass Tunnel.
