= Savenac Nursery Historic District =

Historic district in Montana, United States

- U.S. National Register of Historic Places
- U.S. Historic district
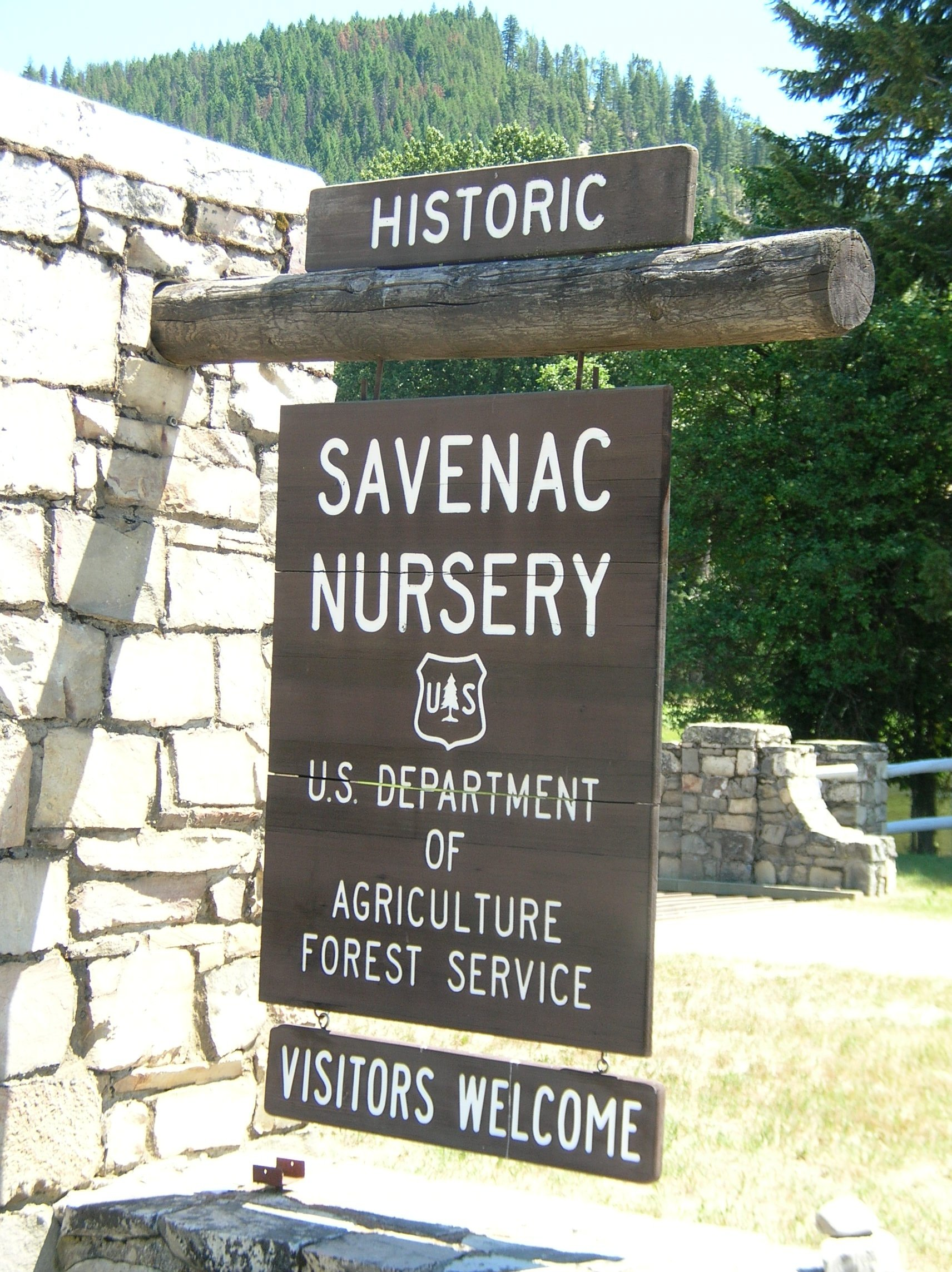

- Location within Montana Location within the United States
- Nearest city: Haugan, Montana
- Coordinates: 47°23′7″N 115°23′47″W
- Area: 340 acres (138 ha)
- Built: 1907
- Architect: William Fox
- Architectural style: Colonial Revival
- NRHP reference No.: 99000988
- Added to NRHP: August 16, 1999

Savenac Nursery Historic District is located near Haugan in Mineral County, Montana. It is 15 miles from St. Regis, Montana. Savenac was once one of the largest and oldest USDA Forest Service tree nurseries in the western United States, operating from 1907 until 1969. The nursery was created by Elers Koch, of the Forest Service, who also helped fight the Great Fire of 1910 that destroyed much of the Rocky Mountains in the northern part of USA, including the nursery. Savenac once produced over 12 million seedlings annually for use in reforestation of national forests throughout the United States. Its former operations have been moved to the Coeur d'Alene Nursery in Idaho.

Savenac was listed in the National Register of Historic Places August 16, 1999. Today ten buildings built during the 1930s by Company 956 of the Civilian Conservation Corps remain at the site, together with landscaped grounds, a stone bridge, interpretive trails and a small arboretum.

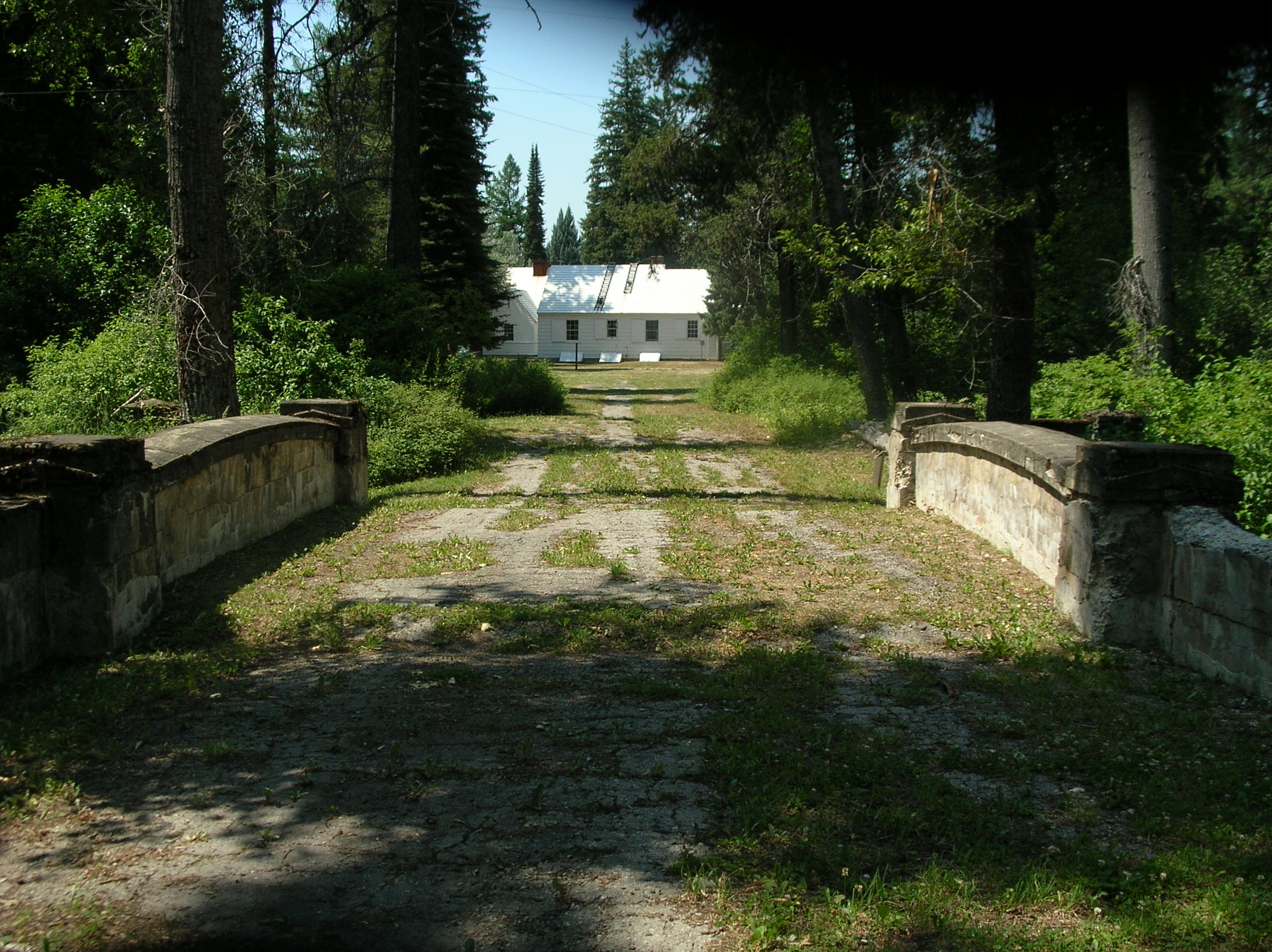
Bridge
