= St. Regis River (Montana) =

River in Montana

Saint Regis River
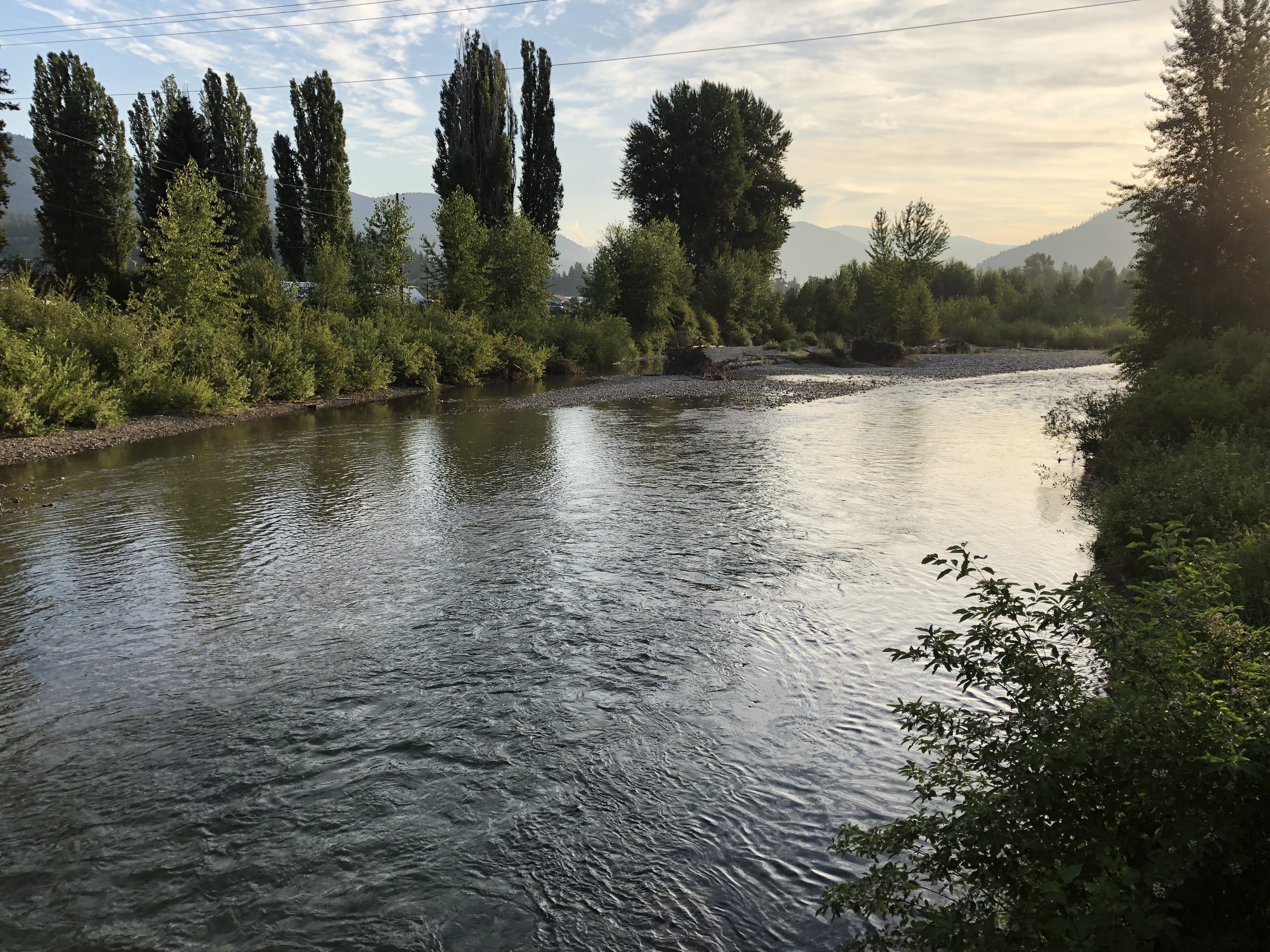
- The St. Regis River near its mouth

Location
- Country: Mineral County, Montana

Physical characteristics
- Source
  - coordinates: 47°25′33″N 115°45′02″W
- Mouth
  - coordinates: 47°17′48″N 115°05′25″W
  - elevation: 2,631 ft (802 m)
- Length: 32.5 mi (52.3 km)
- Basin size: 330 sq mi (850 km^{2})

Basin features
- River system: Columbia River

The St. Regis River is an approximately 32.5-mile (52.3 km) tributary of the Clark Fork of the Columbia River in Montana in the United States.

== Distribution ==
It begins at Lookout Pass on the Idaho/Montana border, flowing east and ends at the confluence with the Clark Fork in the town of St. Regis. Its drainage is 330 square miles (850 km^{2}). The record high flow for the St. Regis River in Montana was recorded on May 19, 1954 at 11,000 cubic feet per second according to USGS gaging data.

== See also ==
- List of rivers of Montana
- Montana Stream Access Law
