= Surveyor Lake (Algoma District) =

Lake in Ontario, Canada

- Location within Ontario
- Location: Algoma District, Ontario
- Coordinates: 46°45′19″N 82°06′06″W
- Primary inflows: Four unnamed creeks
- Primary outflows: Cee Creek
- Basin countries: Canada
- Max. length: 2.8 km (1.7 mi)
- Max. width: 1.7 km (1.1 mi)
- Surface elevation: 427 m (1,401 ft)

Surveyor Lake is a lake in Algoma District, Ontario, Canada, about 60 kilometres (37 mi) northwest of the community of Espanola. A private road with public access runs about 4 kilometres (2.5 mi) west of the lake.

== Hydrology ==
Surveyor Lake is in the Lake Huron drainage basin, is about 2.8 kilometres (1.7 mi) long and 1.7 kilometres (1.1 mi) wide and lies at an elevation of 427 metres (1,401 ft). There are four unnamed creek inflows. The primary outflow, at the northeast, is Cee Creek, which flows into the Wakonassin River, then via the Spanish River into the North Channel of Lake Huron.

== See also ==
- List of lakes in Ontario
