= Lolo National Forest =

National forest in Montana, United States

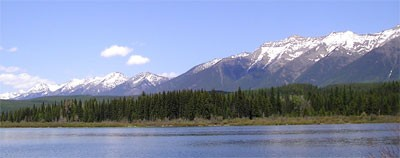
- Rainy Lake in Lolo National Forest

- Location within the United States
- Location: Montana, United States
- Nearest city: Missoula, Montana
- Coordinates: 47°09′N 114°27′W
- Area: 2,197,966 acres (8,894.85 km^{2})
- Established: September 20, 1906
- Governing body: U.S. Forest Service
- Website: Lolo National Forest

Lolo National Forest is a national forest located in western Montana, United States with the western boundary being the state of Idaho. The forest spans 2 million acres (8,000 km^{2}) and includes four wilderness areas; the Scapegoat and the Selway-Bitterroot Wilderness are partially within the forest while the Welcome Creek and Rattlesnake Wildernesses are solely in Lolo National Forest. The forest was created in 1906 from 4 different previous forests which were combined for administrative purposes. Lolo National Forest is west of the Continental divide and has a biodiversity influenced by both continental and maritime weather creating a transitional forest that has a high number of different plant and tree species.

Western red cedar, larch and whitebark pine share the forest with a variety of spruce and fir tree species. Western red cedars grow larger in Lolo National Forest than any other tree species does anywhere in Montana, attaining over 8 feet (250 cm) in diameter and almost 200 feet (60 m) in height. In total, 1,500 plant species exist in the forest as well as 60 species of mammals, 20 varieties of fish and 300 species of birds. Large mammals found in Lolo National Forest include the grizzly, black bear, cougar, timber wolf, mountain goat, bighorn sheep, elk, moose and mule deer. Both the bald and golden eagle reside in the forest along with trumpeter swan, herons and 30 varieties of ducks.

The forest has a dozen improved campgrounds and 700 miles (1,100 km) of hiking trails. There are over 100 named lakes and five rivers including the Flathead River. The city of Missoula, Montana is the location for the forest headquarters and is centrally positioned within sight of the forestlands. There are local ranger district offices in Huson, Missoula, Plains, Seeley Lake, and Superior. The tallest point in the Lolo is Scapegoat Mountain at 9,186 feet (2,800 m).

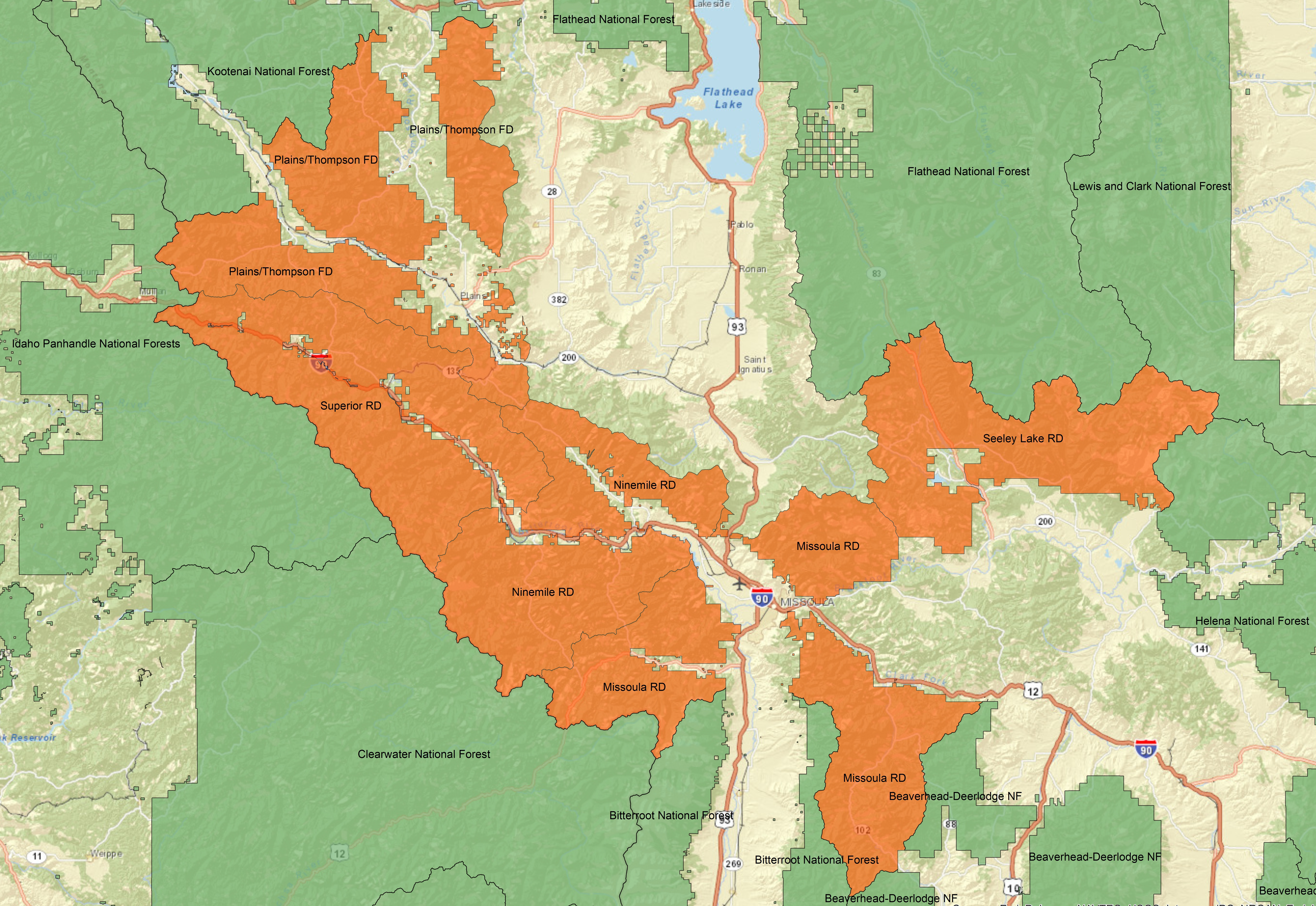
Map of Lolo National Forest

In descending order of land area the forest is located in parts of Mineral, Missoula, Sanders, Granite, Powell, Lewis and Clark, Flathead, and Ravalli counties.

Lolo National Forest was established on September 20, 1906, with 1,211,680 acres (4,903.5 km^{2}). On December 16, 1931, part of Missoula National Forest was added, followed by portions of Selway National Forest in 1934 and part of Cabinet National Forest in 1954.

== Special places ==
- Ninemile Wildlands Training Center - Located near Frenchtown, Ninemile Remount Depot listed on the National Register of Historic Places
- Lolo National Historic Trail - Historic network of trails traveled by the Nez Perce and Lewis and Clark.
- Savenac Historic Tree Nursery - Located near Haugan, former USDA Forest Service nursery designated a National Historic Site

== See also ==
- List of forests in Montana
- List of national forests of the United States
