= Thorn House (Alberton, Montana) =

Historic house in Montana, United States

- U.S. National Register of Historic Places
- Location within Montana Location within the United States
- Location: 140 2nd St., Alberton, Montana
- Coordinates: 47°00′19″N 114°28′54″W
- Area: less than one acre
- Built: 1915
- Architectural style: Bungalow/craftsman
- MPS: Alberton MPS
- NRHP reference No.: 96001605
- Added to NRHP: January 13, 1997

The Thorn House in Alberton, Montana, located at 140 2nd St., was built in 1915. It was listed on the National Register of Historic Places in 1997.

It was home of William "Bill" Thorn, an early Alberton storeowner and postmaster. It was deemed notable as a "well-preserved residence representing Alberton's founding years. It is a typical family residence of the era, reflecting the working class character of this railroad town."
