= St. Regis, Montana =

- Census-designated place
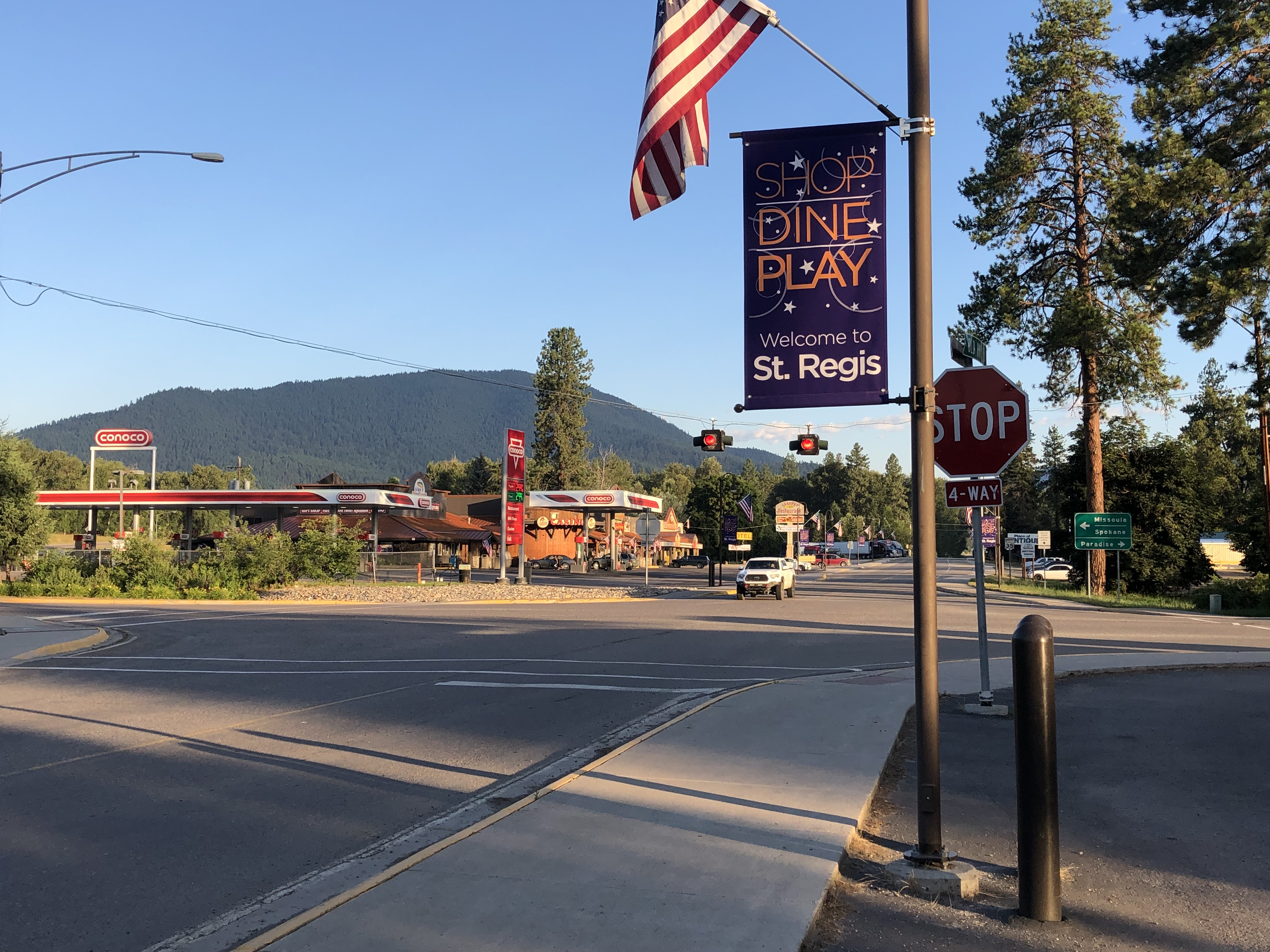
- Center of St. Regis in 2019

- Location in Mineral County and the state of Montana
- Coordinates: 47°17′58″N 115°6′1″W
- Country: United States
- State: Montana
- County: Mineral

Area
  - Total: 0.88 sq mi (2.28 km^{2})
  - Land: 0.86 sq mi (2.22 km^{2})
  - Water: 0.023 sq mi (0.06 km^{2})
- Elevation: 2,635 ft (803 m)

Population (2020)
  - Total: 313
  - Density: 365.5/sq mi (141.12/km^{2})
- Time zone: UTC-7 (Mountain (MST))
  - Summer (DST): UTC-6 (MDT)
- ZIP Code: 59866
- Area code: 406
- FIPS code: 30-65575
- GNIS feature ID: 2409233

St. Regis or Saint Regis is an unincorporated community and census-designated place (CDP) in Mineral County, Montana. The population was 313 at the time of the 2020 census.

Pierre-Jean De Smet travelled extensively in this area of Montana. He named the river, after which the town takes its name, after a fellow Jesuit priest. The post office opened in 1896.

The Northern Pacific Railway built a railroad through the town in the early 1900s, boosting the economy.

== Geography ==
St. Regis is at the confluence of the St. Regis River and the Clark Fork. It is about 30 miles (48 km) from Idaho. It is in the Lolo National Forest and the Bitterroot Mountains.

According to the United States Census Bureau, the St. Regis CDP has a total area of 0.9 square miles (2.3 km^{2}), of which 0.02 square miles (0.06 km^{2}), or 2.65%, are water.

=== Climate ===
This climatic region is typified by large seasonal temperature differences, with warm to hot (and often humid) summers and cold (sometimes severely cold) winters. According to the Köppen Climate Classification system, St. Regis has a humid continental climate, abbreviated "Dfb" on climate maps.

== Demographics ==
Historical population
Census	Pop.	Note	%±
2000	315		—
2010	319		1.3%
2020	313		−1.9%
U.S. Decennial Census

As of the census of 2010, there were 319 people, 135 households, and 73 families residing in the CDP. The population density was 381.4 inhabitants per square mile (147.3/km^{2}). There were 161 housing units at an average density of 194.9 per square mile (75.3/km^{2}). The racial makeup of the CDP was 95.87% White, 2.54% Native American, 0.32% Asian, and 1.27% from two or more races. Hispanic or Latino of any race were 2.54% of the population.

There were 135 households, out of which 25.2% had children under the age of 18 living with them, 41.5% were married couples living together, 9.6% had a female householder with no husband present, and 45.2% were non-families. 38.5% of all households were made up of individuals, and 11.1% had someone living alone who was 65 years of age or older. The average household size was 2.33 and the average family size was 3.09.

In the CDP, the population was spread out, with 27.3% under the age of 18, 7.9% from 18 to 24, 26.3% from 25 to 44, 25.1% from 45 to 64, and 13.3% who were 65 years of age or older. The median age was 39 years. For every 100 females, there were 107.2 males. For every 100 females age 18 and over, there were 106.3 males.

The median income for a household in the CDP was $23,750, and the median income for a family was $27,750. Males had a median income of $29,250 versus $14,844 for females. The per capita income for the CDP was $14,137. About 18.2% of families and 21.0% of the population were below the poverty line, including 27.3% of those under age 18 and 15.2% of those age 65 or over.

== Education ==
St. Regis School District educates students from kindergarten through 12th grade. The district includes three schools. For the 2021-2022 school year, a total of 195 students were enrolled.

Saint Regis High School's team name is the Tigers.

A branch of the Mineral County Public Library is in St. Regis.

== Media ==
The Mineral Independent is the newspaper serving Mineral County. It is printed weekly and also has an e-edition.

Television stations in St. Regis are:

- K29ID-D, Channel 29, licensed from Weeksville
- K34PQ-D, Channel 34, licensed from Plains

Some of the strongest AM radio stations in St. Regis include:

- KERR, 750 AM, licensed from Polson
- KJJR, 880 AM, licensed from Whitefish

Some of the strongest FM radio stations in St. Regis include:

- 87.7 FM/channel 6, ION (KSRM-LD), licensed to St. Regis
- KPLG, 91.5 FM, licensed from Plains
- KSRM-LP, 99.1, licensed to St. Regis (only local radio station)
- KENR-FM, 107.5, licensed from Superior
- KTGC-LP is licensed in St. Regis and run by the public school district

== Infrastructure ==
Interstate 90 runs along the southern edge of the community, with access from Exit 33. I-90 leads southeast 71 miles (114 km) to Missoula and west 93 miles (150 km) to Coeur d'Alene, Idaho.

It is on Montana Highway 135, a shortcut to Glacier National Park for travelers coming from the east.

The nearest commercial airport is in Missoula, 70 miles (113 km) southeast.
