= Mineral County, Montana =

County in Montana, United States

- County
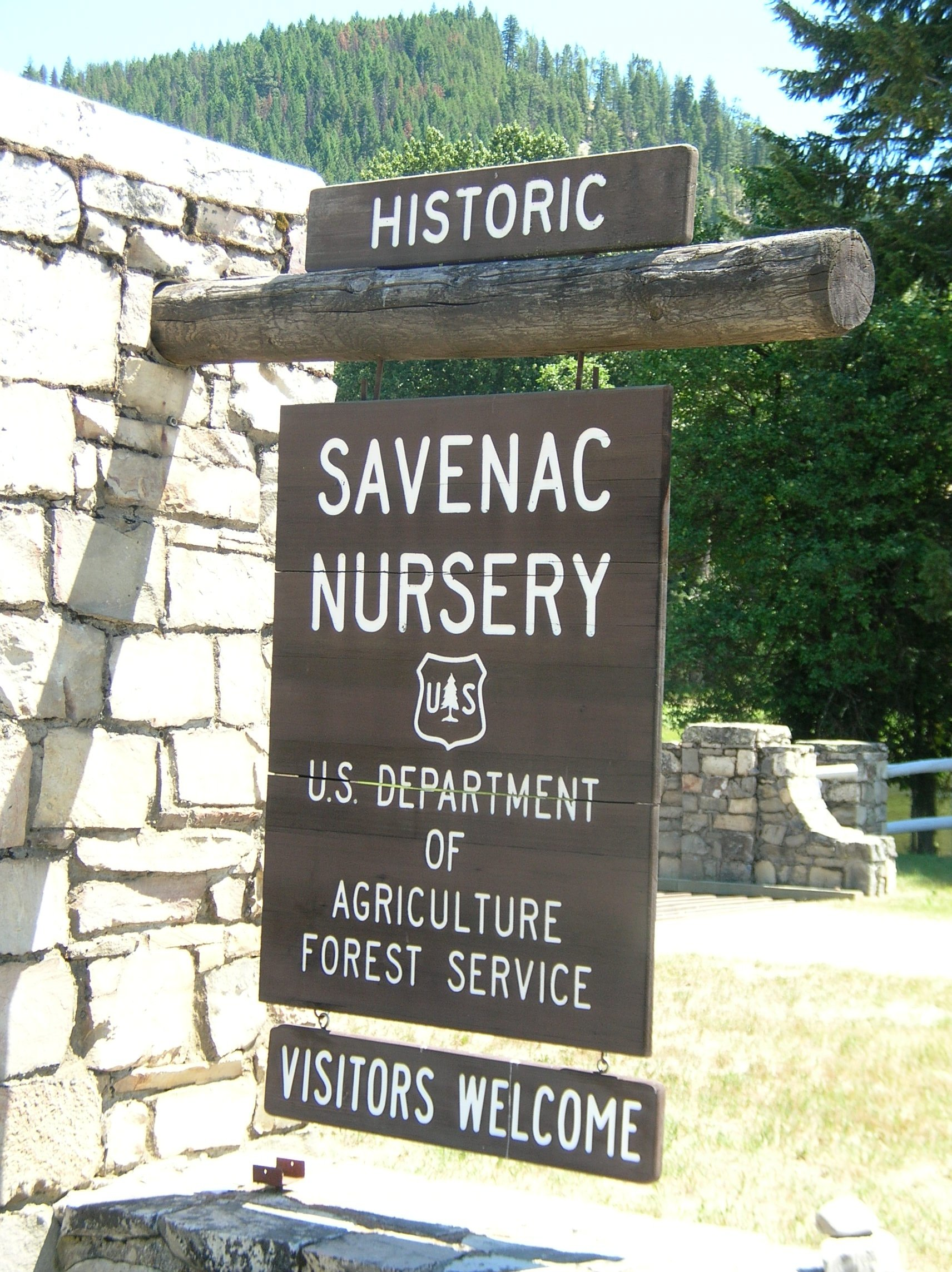
- Welcome Sign at Historic Savenac Tree Nursery

- Location within the U.S. state of Montana
- Coordinates: 47°09′N 114°59′W
- Country: United States
- State: Montana
- Founded: 1914
- Seat: Superior
- Largest town: Superior

Area
  - Total: 1,223 sq mi (3,170 km^{2})
  - Land: 1,219 sq mi (3,160 km^{2})
  - Water: 3.8 sq mi (9.8 km^{2}) 0.3%

Population (2020)
  - Total: 4,535
  - Estimate (2025): 5,185 ▲
  - Density: 3.720/sq mi (1.436/km^{2})
- Time zone: UTC−7 (Mountain)
  - Summer (DST): UTC−6 (MDT)
- Congressional district: 1st
- Website: www.co.mineral.mt.us
- Montana county number 54

Mineral County is a county located in the U.S. state of Montana. As of the 2020 census, the population was 4,535. Its county seat is Superior.

== Geography ==
According to the United States Census Bureau, the county has a total area of 1,223 square miles (3,170 km^{2}), of which 1,219 square miles (3,160 km^{2}) is land and 3.8 square miles (9.8 km^{2}) (0.3%) is water.

=== Major highways ===
- Interstate 90
- U.S. Route 10 (Former)
- Montana Highway 135

=== Adjacent counties ===
- Sanders County - north
- Missoula County - east
- Clearwater County, Idaho - southwest/Pacific Time Border
- Shoshone County, Idaho - northwest/Pacific Time Border

=== National protected area ===
- Lolo National Forest (part)

== Politics ==
Mineral County has voted for the Republican Party candidate in all national elections since 2000. Before that, its voting was more balanced.

United States presidential election results for Mineral County, Montana
Year	Republican		Democratic		Third party(ies)	
Year	No.	%	No.	%	No.	%
1916	251	20.47%	781	63.70%	194	15.82%
1920	347	39.03%	362	40.72%	180	20.25%
1924	223	21.61%	123	11.92%	686	66.47%
1928	443	53.25%	370	44.47%	19	2.28%
1932	260	27.23%	578	60.52%	117	12.25%
1936	215	22.40%	657	68.44%	88	9.17%
1940	402	37.64%	645	60.39%	21	1.97%
1944	380	47.98%	401	50.63%	11	1.39%
1948	338	39.30%	475	55.23%	47	5.47%
1952	553	52.47%	491	46.58%	10	0.95%
1956	606	52.33%	552	47.67%	0	0.00%
1960	549	44.27%	686	55.32%	5	0.40%
1964	368	28.89%	901	70.72%	5	0.39%
1968	483	41.32%	576	49.27%	110	9.41%
1972	706	49.75%	659	46.44%	54	3.81%
1976	679	44.85%	819	54.10%	16	1.06%
1980	800	48.28%	660	39.83%	197	11.89%
1984	943	55.34%	718	42.14%	43	2.52%
1988	616	43.14%	789	55.25%	23	1.61%
1992	403	24.65%	664	40.61%	568	34.74%
1996	549	33.99%	658	40.74%	408	25.26%
2000	1,078	65.77%	382	23.31%	179	10.92%
2004	1,242	67.61%	542	29.50%	53	2.89%
2008	1,053	52.73%	845	42.31%	99	4.96%
2012	1,216	60.17%	700	34.64%	105	5.20%
2016	1,330	66.10%	519	25.80%	163	8.10%
2020	1,828	71.32%	686	26.77%	49	1.91%
2024	2,049	72.33%	689	24.32%	95	3.35%

== Demographics ==
Historical population
Census	Pop.	Note	%±
1920	2,327		—
1930	1,626		−30.1%
1940	2,135		31.3%
1950	2,081		−2.5%
1960	3,037		45.9%
1970	2,958		−2.6%
1980	3,675		24.2%
1990	3,315		−9.8%
2000	3,884		17.2%
2010	4,223		8.7%
2020	4,535		7.4%
2025 (est.)	5,185	▲	14.3%
U.S. Decennial Census; 1790–1960, 1900–1990, 1990–2000, 2010–2020

=== 2020 census ===
As of the 2020 census, the county had a population of 4,535. Of the residents, 18.0% were under the age of 18 and 28.6% were 65 years of age or older; the median age was 52.8 years. For every 100 females there were 105.6 males, and for every 100 females age 18 and over there were 106.0 males. 0.0% of residents lived in urban areas and 100.0% lived in rural areas.

The racial makeup of the county was 90.3% White, 0.2% Black or African American, 1.5% American Indian and Alaska Native, 0.5% Asian, 0.9% from some other race, and 6.4% from two or more races. Hispanic or Latino residents of any race comprised 3.2% of the population.

There were 2,040 households in the county, of which 20.1% had children under the age of 18 living with them and 20.7% had a female householder with no spouse or partner present. About 31.3% of all households were made up of individuals and 15.9% had someone living alone who was 65 years of age or older.

There were 2,563 housing units, of which 20.4% were vacant. Among occupied housing units, 75.5% were owner-occupied and 24.5% were renter-occupied. The homeowner vacancy rate was 1.6% and the rental vacancy rate was 7.1%.

=== 2010 census ===
As of the 2010 census, there were 4,223 people, 1,911 households, and 1,229 families in the county. The population density was 3.5 inhabitants per square mile (1.4 inhabitants/km^{2}). There were 2,446 housing units at an average density of 2.0 units per square mile (0.77 units/km^{2}). The racial makeup of the county was 94.9% white, 1.5% American Indian, 0.7% Asian, 0.3% black or African American, 0.2% from other races, and 2.4% from two or more races. Those of Hispanic or Latino origin made up 1.9% of the population. In terms of ancestry, 30.9% were German, 16.9% were Irish, 15.4% were English, and 3.0% were American.

Of the 1,911 households, 21.9% had children under the age of 18 living with them, 52.4% were married couples living together, 7.3% had a female householder with no husband present, 35.7% were non-families, and 29.7% of all households were made up of individuals. The average household size was 2.20 and the average family size was 2.69. The median age was 49.8 years.

The median income for a household in the county was $37,256 and the median income for a family was $44,271. Males had a median income of $35,536 versus $20,370 for females. The per capita income for the county was $19,209. About 12.7% of families and 19.0% of the population were below the poverty line, including 36.0% of those under age 18 and 4.3% of those age 65 or over.

== Communities ==
=== Towns ===
- Alberton
- Superior (county seat)

=== Census-designated places ===
- Cyr
- De Borgia
- Haugan
- Riverbend
- Saltese
- St. Regis

=== Other unincorporated communities ===
- Borax (part of Saltese)
- Bryson
- Cabin City
- Drexel
- East Portal
- Henderson
- Keystone
- Lozeau
- Quartz
- Sohon
- Spring Gulch
- Tammany
- Tarkio
- Westfall

=== Former community ===
- Taft

== See also ==
- List of lakes in Mineral County, Montana
- List of mountains in Mineral County, Montana
- National Register of Historic Places listings in Mineral County, Montana
