= Superior, Montana =

- Town
- Location of Superior in Mineral County and the state of Montana
- Coordinates: 47°11′24″N 114°52′48″W
- Country: United States
- State: Montana
- County: Mineral
- Established: 1871

Area
  - Total: 1.07 sq mi (2.77 km^{2})
  - Land: 0.95 sq mi (2.47 km^{2})
  - Water: 0.12 sq mi (0.30 km^{2})
- Elevation: 2,720 ft (830 m)

Population (2020)
  - Total: 830
  - Density: 869.2/sq mi (335.59/km^{2})
- Time zone: UTC-7 (Mountain (MST))
  - Summer (DST): UTC-6 (MDT)
- ZIP code: 59872
- Area code: 406
- FIPS code: 30-72625
- GNIS feature ID: 2413356
- Website: townofsuperiormontana.org

Superior is a town in, and the county seat of, Mineral County, Montana, United States. The population was 830 at the 2020 census.

== History ==
Superior was named after its founders' hometown of Superior, Wisconsin, in 1869. The post office was established in 1871 after Mineral County became the site of one of the largest gold strikes that helped settle the West.

In the 1860s and '70s, several thousand miners converged on Cedar Creek. Mining has remained central to the economy, along with the development of logging and United States Forest Service activities.

In 1908, the Superior Hotel received the first Bibles to be placed in hotel rooms by The Gideons. This is noted on a historic plaque on Mullan Road.

The Mineral County Museum is located in Superior.

== Geography ==
Superior is located on the northeast side of the Bitterroot Range of mountains in western Montana. Via Interstate 90, it is 57 miles (92 km) northwest of Missoula and 60 miles (97 km) southeast of Wallace, Idaho. The Clark Fork flows through downtown, heading northwest towards St. Regis and ultimately emptying into Lake Pend Oreille near Cabinet, Idaho. The Bitterroots to the west of Superior along the Montana/Idaho border receive a large amount of precipitation annually, mostly due to the amount of snow in the winter months. Nearby Lookout Pass Ski and Recreation Area receives approximately 400 in (1,000 cm) of snow each winter. The snow pack melts throughout the spring and summer months, feeding the many mountain streams and creeks with water. All the water eventually reaches the Clark Fork in the valley below, where Superior is located.

According to the U.S. Census Bureau, the town has a total area of 1.07 square miles (2.77 km^{2}), of which 0.96 square miles (2.49 km^{2}) are land and 0.12 square miles (0.31 km^{2}), or 10.75%, are water.

=== Climate ===
Climate data for Superior, Montana (1981–2010)
Month	Jan	Feb	Mar	Apr	May	Jun	Jul	Aug	Sep	Oct	Nov	Dec	Year
Mean daily maximum °F (°C)	35.9 (2.2)	42.7 (5.9)	52.6 (11.4)	61.0 (16.1)	69.7 (20.9)	77.1 (25.1)	86.7 (30.4)	86.6 (30.3)	75.6 (24.2)	60.3 (15.7)	42.8 (6.0)	33.0 (0.6)	60.3 (15.7)
Mean daily minimum °F (°C)	21.3 (−5.9)	22.5 (−5.3)	27.8 (−2.3)	32.7 (0.4)	39.4 (4.1)	45.9 (7.7)	50.4 (10.2)	49.3 (9.6)	41.8 (5.4)	33.7 (0.9)	27.5 (−2.5)	20.2 (−6.6)	34.4 (1.3)
Average precipitation inches (mm)	1.15 (29)	1.13 (29)	1.22 (31)	1.29 (33)	1.97 (50)	2.06 (52)	0.98 (25)	1.33 (34)	1.19 (30)	1.29 (33)	1.81 (46)	1.52 (39)	16.92 (430)
Average snowfall inches (cm)	2.0 (5.1)	2.6 (6.6)	0.3 (0.76)	0.1 (0.25)	0.0 (0.0)	0.0 (0.0)	0.0 (0.0)	0.0 (0.0)	0.0 (0.0)	0.0 (0.0)	3.5 (8.9)	5.7 (14)	14.2 (36)
Source: NOAA

== Demographics ==
Historical population
Census	Pop.	Note	%±
1950	626		—
1960	1,242		98.4%
1970	993		−20.0%
1980	1,054		6.1%
1990	881		−16.4%
2000	893		1.4%
2010	812		−9.1%
2020	830		2.2%
U.S. Decennial Census

=== 2010 census ===
As of the census of 2010, there were 812 people, 386 households, and 220 families residing in the town. The population density was 773.3 inhabitants per square mile (298.6/km^{2}). There were 431 housing units at an average density of 410.5 per square mile (158.5/km^{2}). The racial makeup of the town was 93.8% White, 0.7% African American, 1.2% Native American, 1.6% Asian, 0.1% from other races, and 2.5% from two or more races. Hispanic or Latino of any race were 2.3% of the population.

There were 386 households, of which 20.2% had children under the age of 18 living with them, 43.0% were married couples living together, 9.6% had a female householder with no husband present, 4.4% had a male householder with no wife present, and 43.0% were non-families. 37.6% of all households were made up of individuals, and 17.8% had someone living alone who was 65 years of age or older. The average household size was 2.05 and the average family size was 2.64.

The median age in the town was 52.1 years. 15.9% of residents were under the age of 18; 6.9% were between the ages of 18 and 24; 15.9% were from 25 to 44; 35.4% were from 45 to 64; and 25.9% were 65 years of age or older. The gender makeup of the town was 48.5% male and 51.5% female.

=== 2000 census ===
As of the census of 2000, there were 893 people, 358 households, and 218 families residing in the town. The population density was 823.3 inhabitants per square mile (317.9/km^{2}). There were 410 housing units at an average density of 378.0 per square mile (145.9/km^{2}). The racial makeup of the town was 92.83% White, 0.11% African American, 2.91% Native American, 0.78% Asian, 0.11% from other races, and 3.25% from two or more races. Hispanic or Latino of any race were 1.90% of the population.

There were 358 households, out of which 29.1% had children under the age of 18 living with them, 47.8% were married couples living together, 9.2% had a female householder with no husband present, and 39.1% were non-families. 33.8% of all households were made up of individuals, and 12.8% had someone living alone who was 65 years of age or older. The average household size was 2.32 and the average family size was 2.93.

In the town, the population was spread out, with 25.3% under the age of 18, 6.9% from 18 to 24, 26.2% from 25 to 44, 24.0% from 45 to 64, and 17.6% who were 65 years of age or older. The median age was 40 years. For every 100 females there were 99.8 males. For every 100 females age 18 and over, there were 99.1 males.

The median income for a household in the town was $25,333, and the median income for a family was $31,650. Males had a median income of $24,688 versus $18,750 for females. The per capita income for the town was $14,154. About 10.4% of families and 17.0% of the population were below the poverty line, including 23.0% of those under age 18 and 7.4% of those age 65 or over.

== Education ==
The Superior School District educates students from kindergarten to 12th grade. There are three schools: Elementary (K-6), Middle (7–8), and Superior High School (9–12). The high school had 110 student enrolled during the 2021–2022 school year.

The Mineral County Public Library is located in Superior. It has branches in Alberton and St. Regis.

== Media ==
The Mineral Independent is the newspaper serving Mineral County. It is printed weekly and also has an e-edition.

The FM radio station KENR is licensed in Superior.

Released in 2025, country music singer Chase Rice references Superior in his song Circa 1943.

== Infrastructure ==
Interstate 90 passes the town at the southern border. Access is via exit 47.

Mineral County Airport is a county-owned public-use airport located two miles (3.7 km) southeast of town.

== Notable people ==
- Pokey Allen, professional and college football player and coach, born in Superior.
