= Alberton, Montana =

- Town
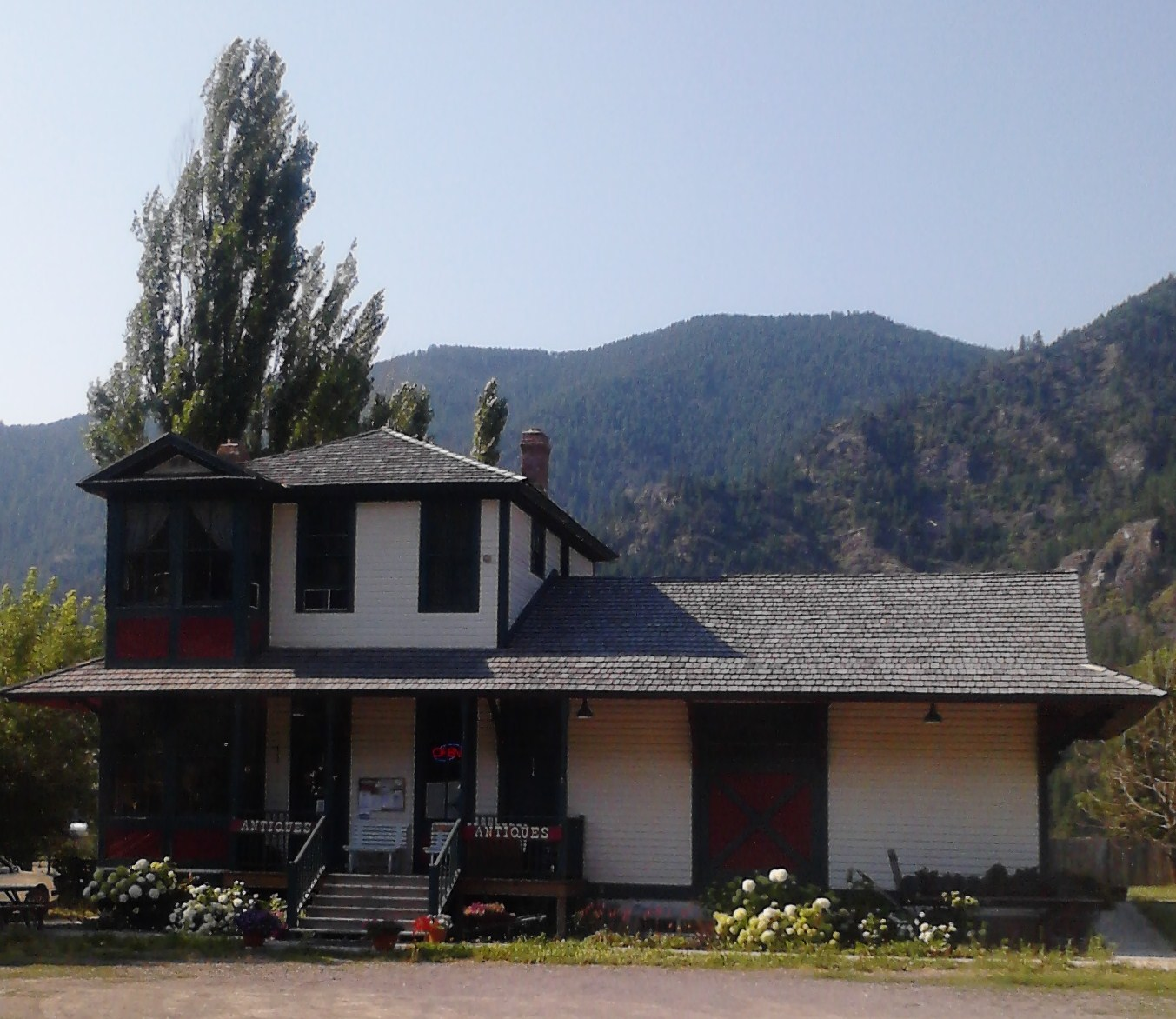
- Antique shop in Alberton

- Location in Mineral County and Montana
- Coordinates: 47°00′05″N 114°29′00″W
- Country: United States
- State: Montana
- County: Mineral

Government
  - Type: Mayor–Council
  - Mayor: Anna LeDuc

Area
  - Total: 0.58 sq mi (1.49 km^{2})
  - Land: 0.55 sq mi (1.42 km^{2})
  - Water: 0.027 sq mi (0.07 km^{2})
- Elevation: 3,055 ft (931 m)

Population (2020)
  - Total: 452
  - Density: 825.9/sq mi (318.88/km^{2})
- Time zone: UTC-7 (Mountain (MST))
  - Summer (DST): UTC-6 (MDT)
- ZIP code: 59820
- Area code: 406
- FIPS code: 30-00700
- GNIS ID: 2412342
- Website: albertonmontana.com

Alberton is a town in Mineral County, Montana, United States. The population was 452 at the 2020 census.

== History ==
A post office called Alberton has been in operation since 1909. The town was named for Albert J. Earling, president of the Chicago, Milwaukee, St. Paul and Pacific Railroad.

On April 11, 1996, a Montana Rail Link train carrying chlorine derailed near Alberton. 350 people were injured by chlorine inhalation. 1,000 people were evacuated from Alberton and from Frenchtown. Interstate 90 was shut down for nineteen days. The incident has been described as the largest chemical spill from a train in United States history.

== Geography ==
Alberton is located in eastern Mineral County on Interstate 90 at exit 75. The southern border of the town is the Clark Fork River. Missoula County is to the south across the river. I-90 leads east 29 miles (47 km) to Missoula and northwest the same distance to Superior, the Mineral county seat.

According to the U.S. Census Bureau, Alberton has a total area of 0.57 square miles (1.48 km^{2}), of which 0.03 square miles (0.08 km^{2}), or 4.54%, are water.

=== Climate ===
Alberton has a cool-summer humid continental climate (Köppen Dfb).

Climate data for Alberton, Montana, 1991–2020 normals, extremes 1958–present
Month	Jan	Feb	Mar	Apr	May	Jun	Jul	Aug	Sep	Oct	Nov	Dec	Year
Record high °F (°C)	59 (15)	62 (17)	80 (27)	87 (31)	93 (34)	105 (41)	105 (41)	105 (41)	100 (38)	87 (31)	71 (22)	68 (20)	105 (41)
Mean maximum °F (°C)	48.3 (9.1)	51.7 (10.9)	65.1 (18.4)	77.1 (25.1)	85.8 (29.9)	93.1 (33.9)	99.4 (37.4)	98.5 (36.9)	91.5 (33.1)	77.4 (25.2)	59.0 (15.0)	47.5 (8.6)	100.7 (38.2)
Mean daily maximum °F (°C)	34.6 (1.4)	40.1 (4.5)	48.9 (9.4)	58.2 (14.6)	67.6 (19.8)	75.2 (24.0)	86.8 (30.4)	86.5 (30.3)	75.7 (24.3)	57.8 (14.3)	41.0 (5.0)	32.7 (0.4)	58.8 (14.9)
Daily mean °F (°C)	26.3 (−3.2)	30.2 (−1.0)	36.7 (2.6)	44.2 (6.8)	52.7 (11.5)	59.7 (15.4)	67.7 (19.8)	66.8 (19.3)	57.6 (14.2)	44.1 (6.7)	32.6 (0.3)	25.7 (−3.5)	45.4 (7.4)
Mean daily minimum °F (°C)	18.0 (−7.8)	20.2 (−6.6)	24.5 (−4.2)	30.3 (−0.9)	37.8 (3.2)	44.2 (6.8)	48.7 (9.3)	47.2 (8.4)	39.6 (4.2)	30.4 (−0.9)	24.1 (−4.4)	18.8 (−7.3)	32.0 (0.0)
Mean minimum °F (°C)	−1.1 (−18.4)	3.9 (−15.6)	13.1 (−10.5)	22.0 (−5.6)	27.1 (−2.7)	35.6 (2.0)	40.4 (4.7)	39.8 (4.3)	30.4 (−0.9)	17.5 (−8.1)	10.6 (−11.9)	0.5 (−17.5)	−7.4 (−21.9)
Record low °F (°C)	−28 (−33)	−22 (−30)	−12 (−24)	12 (−11)	21 (−6)	29 (−2)	31 (−1)	32 (0)	21 (−6)	−9 (−23)	−12 (−24)	−29 (−34)	−29 (−34)
Average precipitation inches (mm)	1.45 (37)	1.50 (38)	1.70 (43)	1.66 (42)	2.04 (52)	2.19 (56)	0.88 (22)	0.91 (23)	1.07 (27)	1.64 (42)	2.02 (51)	1.60 (41)	18.66 (474)
Average snowfall inches (cm)	10.3 (26)	11.1 (28)	6.0 (15)	1.4 (3.6)	0.1 (0.25)	0.0 (0.0)	0.0 (0.0)	0.0 (0.0)	0.1 (0.25)	1.2 (3.0)	6.4 (16)	12.8 (33)	49.4 (125.1)
Average precipitation days (≥ 0.01 in)	13.6	12.8	14.0	13.0	12.4	12.7	5.0	6.3	7.8	12.1	13.1	14.4	137.2
Average snowy days (≥ 0.1 in)	8.9	8.1	4.9	1.6	0.1	0.0	0.0	0.0	0.1	0.7	5.0	9.5	38.9
Source 1: NOAA
Source 2: National Weather Service

== Demographics ==
Historical population
Census	Pop.	Note	%±
1930	276		—
1940	283		2.5%
1950	326		15.2%
1960	356		9.2%
1970	363		2.0%
1980	368		1.4%
1990	354		−3.8%
2000	374		5.6%
2010	420		12.3%
2020	452		7.6%
U.S. Decennial Census

=== 2010 census ===
As of the census of 2010, there were 420 people, 190 households, and 113 families residing in the town. The population density was 736.8 inhabitants per square mile (284.5/km^{2}). There were 202 housing units at an average density of 354.4 per square mile (136.8/km^{2}). The racial makeup of the town was 96.0% White, 1.0% African American, 0.7% Native American, 0.2% from other races, and 2.1% from two or more races. Hispanic or Latino people of any race were 1.9% of the population.

There were 190 households, of which 26.3% had children under the age of 18 living with them, 46.3% were married couples living together, 9.5% had a female householder with no husband present, 3.7% had a male householder with no wife present, and 40.5% were non-families. 33.2% of all households were made up of individuals, and 15.7% had someone living alone who was 65 years of age or older. The average household size was 2.21 and the average family size was 2.81.

The median age in the town was 43.3 years. 19% of residents were under the age of 18; 7.7% were between the ages of 18 and 24; 25.8% were from 25 to 44; 30.1% were from 45 to 64; and 17.6% were 65 years of age or older. The gender makeup of the town was 53.1% male and 46.9% female.

=== 2000 census ===
As of the census of 2000, there were 374 people, 152 households, and 108 families residing in the town. The population density was 652.7 inhabitants per square mile (252.0/km^{2}). There were 175 housing units at an average density of 305.4 per square mile (117.9/km^{2}). The racial makeup of the town was 97.59% White, 0.27% African American, 1.07% Native American, 0.27% from other races, and 0.80% from two or more races. Hispanic or Latino people of any race were 0.53% of the population.

There were 152 households, out of which 35.5% had children under the age of 18 living with them, 60.5% were married couples living together, 6.6% had a female householder with no husband present, and 28.3% were non-families. 23.7% of all households were made up of individuals, and 3.9% had someone living alone who was 65 years of age or older. The average household size was 2.46 and the average family size was 2.88.

In the town, the population was spread out, with 27.0% under the age of 18, 5.9% from 18 to 24, 32.1% from 25 to 44, 26.7% from 45 to 64, and 8.3% who were 65 years of age or older. The median age was 36 years. For every 100 females there were 96.8 males. For every 100 females age 18 and over, there were 103.7 males.

The median income for a household in the town was $26,000, and the median income for a family was $26,500. Males had a median income of $24,792 versus $20,000 for females. The per capita income for the town was $13,120. About 19.6% of families and 19.6% of the population were below the poverty line, including 25.2% of those under age 18 and 3.7% of those age 65 or over.

== Arts and culture ==
The town celebrates its railroad heritage each year with Alberton's Railroad Day, held the third Saturday in July. The festival started in 1985. There is also the Railroad Museum, open during summers and operated by volunteers.

Hank Roat Memorial Park includes a skatepark.

A farmer's market is held during the summer. It features local plants, vegetables, crafts and has local musicians for entertainment.

A branch of the Mineral County Public Library is in Alberton.

== Government ==
Alberton has a mayor and town council. There are four members on the town council. All positions are nonpartisan and have four year terms. In the 2025 mayoral election Loreen Felstet defeated incumbent mayor Anna LeDuc.

== Education ==
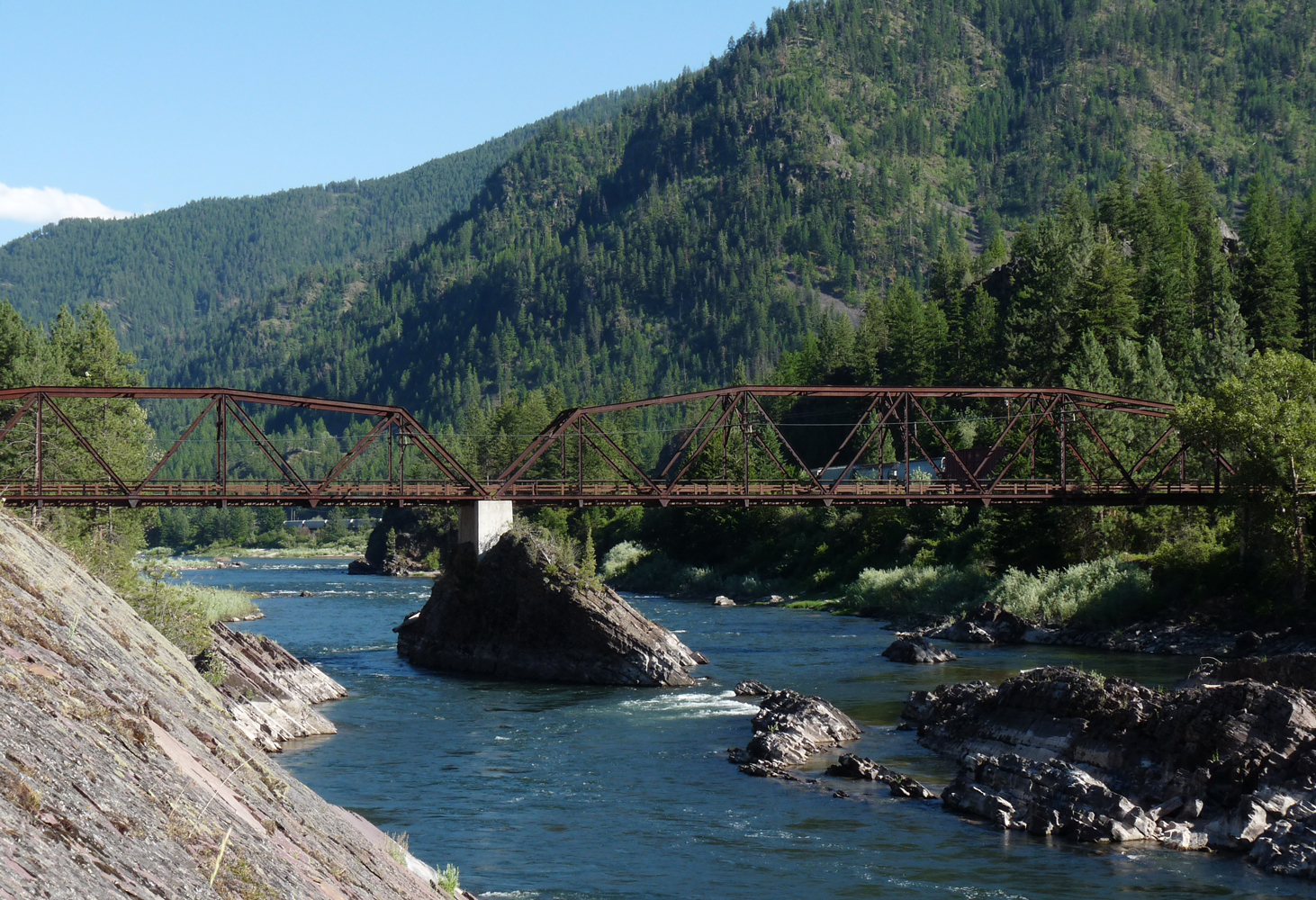
Natural Pier Bridge near Alberton

Alberton School began as a wooden, one room school house in the early 1900s. In 1916, a fire burned down the original school. In 1920, a new brick building was built; this later became the elementary school building. The brick building is listed on the National Register of Historic Places. The current high school building is 50 feet from the elementary building and is roughly octagonal in shape. Both buildings have two stories and are connected by a tunnel. The school's mascot is the Panther, and the school has football, volleyball, boys' and girls' basketball, and track and field on campus. The school also participates in wrestling, tennis, and golf as part of cooperatives with other schools in the area. The school transferred from eight-man to six-man football in 2010.

It is the home of Northwest Indian Bible School, a Bible-training institution founded and operated by the Allegheny Wesleyan Methodist Connection (Original Allegheny Conference).

== Media ==
The Mineral Independent is the newspaper serving Mineral County. It is printed weekly and also has an e-edition.

== See also ==
- List of municipalities in Montana
