= Interstate 90 in Montana =

Section of Interstate Highway in Montana, United States

Interstate 90
- I-90 highlighted in red

Route information
- Maintained by MDT
- Length: 552.46 mi (889.10 km)
- Existed: 1957–present
- History: Completed in 1987
- NHS: Entire route

Major junctions
- West end: I-90 at Idaho state line near Mullan, ID
- US 93 / MT 200 in Missoula; US 12 from Missoula to Garrison; I-15 west of Butte; I-115 in Butte; I-15 east of Butte; US 191 in Bozeman; US 212 / US 310 in Laurel; US 87 in Billings; I-94 in Billings; US 212 near Crow Agency
- East end: I-90 / US 87 at Wyoming state line near Ranchester, WY

Location
- Country: United States
- State: Montana
- Counties: Mineral, Missoula, Granite, Powell, Deer Lodge, Silver Bow, Jefferson, Broadwater, Gallatin, Park, Sweet Grass, Stillwater, Yellowstone, Big Horn

Highway system
- Interstate Highway System; Main; Auxiliary; Suffixed; Business; Future; Montana Highway System; Interstate; US; State; Secondary
← US 89	→ US 93

Interstate 90 (I-90) is an east–west transcontinental Interstate Highway across the northern United States, linking Seattle to Boston. The portion in the state of Montana is 552.54 miles (889.23 km) in length, passing through 14 counties in central and southern Montana. It is the longest segment of I-90 within a single state.

== Route description ==
=== Mineral County ===
I-90 enters Montana and Mineral County from Shoshone County, Idaho over the 4,725-foot (1,440 m) high Lookout Pass, which traverses the Coeur d'Alene Mountains of the Bitterroot Range, and immediately has its first interchange, a partial cloverleaf interchange serving extreme northwest Mineral County and access to Lookout Pass Ski and Recreation Area. The highway continues southeasterly through woodlands, paralleling the St. Regis River, before meeting the Dena Mora (Lookout Pass) rest area 4.7 miles (7.6 km) east of the Idaho–Montana border. About 0.5 miles (0.80 km) from the rest stop is a diamond interchange, serving a small minor road into the St. Joe National Forest in Idaho.

The highway continues, winding through the woodlands until another diamond interchange, serving the small unincorporated community of Saltese. Continuing east for about six miles (9.7 km), each direction diverges for a small distance before returning side to side for a diamond interchange serving the unincorporated community of Haugan.

Two miles (3.2 km) after Haugan, I-90 intersects the census-designated place (CDP) of De Borgia, continuing southeasterly, intersecting several minor roads, before reaching the CDP of St. Regis and Montana Highway 135 (MT 135). The highway stops paralleling the St. Regis River, and begins to parallel, and cross over several times, the Clark Fork River. Superior, the county seat, is intersected before the highway turns south through the Quartz Flats rest area, located 58.2 miles (93.7 km) from the Idaho border. After leaving the rest area, the highway straightens out, heading easterly. The highway continues east before exiting the county, just south of Alberton.

=== Missoula, Granite, and Powell counties ===
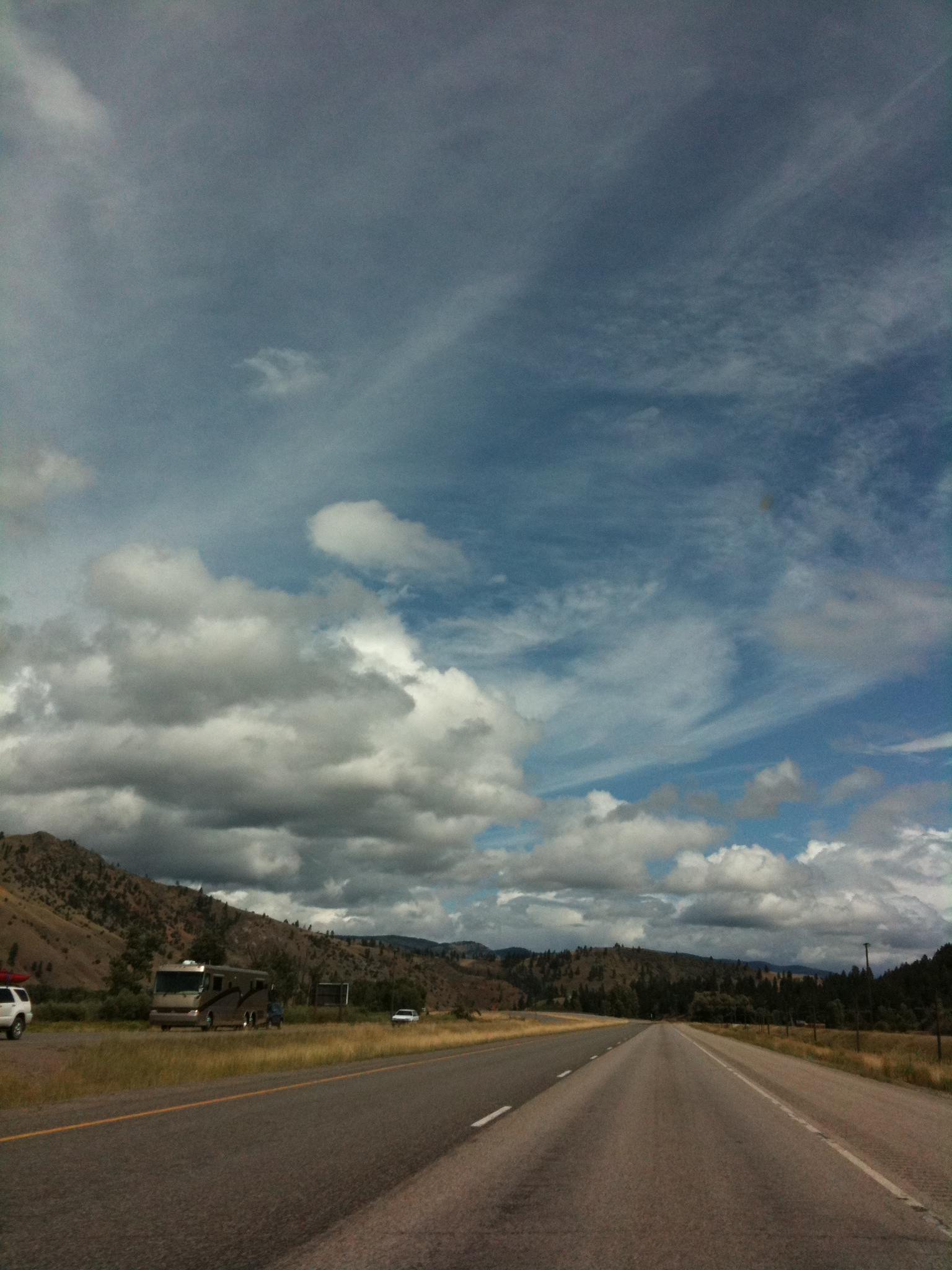
I-90 in Granite County, facing east

Entering Missoula County, the highway intersects Alberton, before continuing easterly through Huson and Secondary Highway 263 (S-263). The highway continues southeast before intersecting the concurrent highways US Highway 93 (US 93) and MT 200, which join I-90 from the west. The three highways continue into the county seat of Missoula, where, at the first exit, US 93 leaves on the western border of Missoula and travels through Orchard Homes. The next two exits travel into Downtown Missoula, while the last exit serves East Missoula. US 12 joins I-90 and MT 200 exits to the north of the highway outside of Missoula, paralleling the Blackfoot River as I-90 continues east, following and then intersecting S-210 in Clinton. The Bearmouth rest area, 142.8 miles (229.8 km) from the Idaho border, is intersected before crossing the Missoula–Granite county border.

After entering Granite County, I-90 has an interchange with an access road to the Garnet Back Country Byway, providing access to the Garnet Range on the west slope of the Rocky Mountains. The highway passes north of Lolo National Forest while headed easterly. The highway continues through northern Granite county, intersecting MT 1 before exiting the county entering Powell County. I-90 intersects S-272 13 miles (21 km) after entering the county, which clips the eastern segment of Lolo National Forest, before the seasonal Gold Creek rest area is intersected. Garrison is northeast of the highway as US 12 ends its concurrency, traveling north from I-90 toward the state capital of Helena. I-90 turns south, paralleling former Northern Pacific Railway trackage, before intersecting S-275 and the county seat, Deer Lodge. Continuing south, I-90 exits Powell County at Racetrack.

=== Deer Lodge, Silver Bow, and Jefferson counties ===
I-90 bisects the northern tip of Deer Lodge County, in a southwesterly direction. Galen and S-273 are intersected, before the highway passes west of the Warm Springs State Wildlife Management Area. After passing the wildlife management area, the highway passes by Warm Springs and MT 48. Just northwest of the Deer Lodge–Silver Bow county border, I-90 intersects MT 1.

Fairmont Hot Springs Resort, accessible via S-441, is the first exit in Silver Bow County on I-90, as the highway starts to turn back toward the east. Ramsay is located in the southwest corner of the interchange where I-15 becomes concurrent with I-90 through Butte. On the western edge of Butte, I-115 continues east into town, as I-15/I-90 turns southeast, bypassing most of downtown Butte. An interchange with MT 2 serves Bert Mooney Airport before I-15/I-90 split just east of Butte, with I-15 continuing north over the Continental Divide over the 6,368-foot (1,941 m) high Elk Park Pass, which straddles the Silver Bow–Jefferson county border. I-90 heads south then east, also entering Jefferson County, passing over the divide at Homestake Pass which is 6,375-foot (1,943 m) high. After traveling the pass, an emergency escape ramp can be found on the highway's eastbound lanes. Jefferson County has interchanges with S-399 east of Pipestone, Montana and S-359 east of Cardwell before meeting the Jefferson–Broadwater county border.

=== Broadwater, Gallatin, and Park counties ===
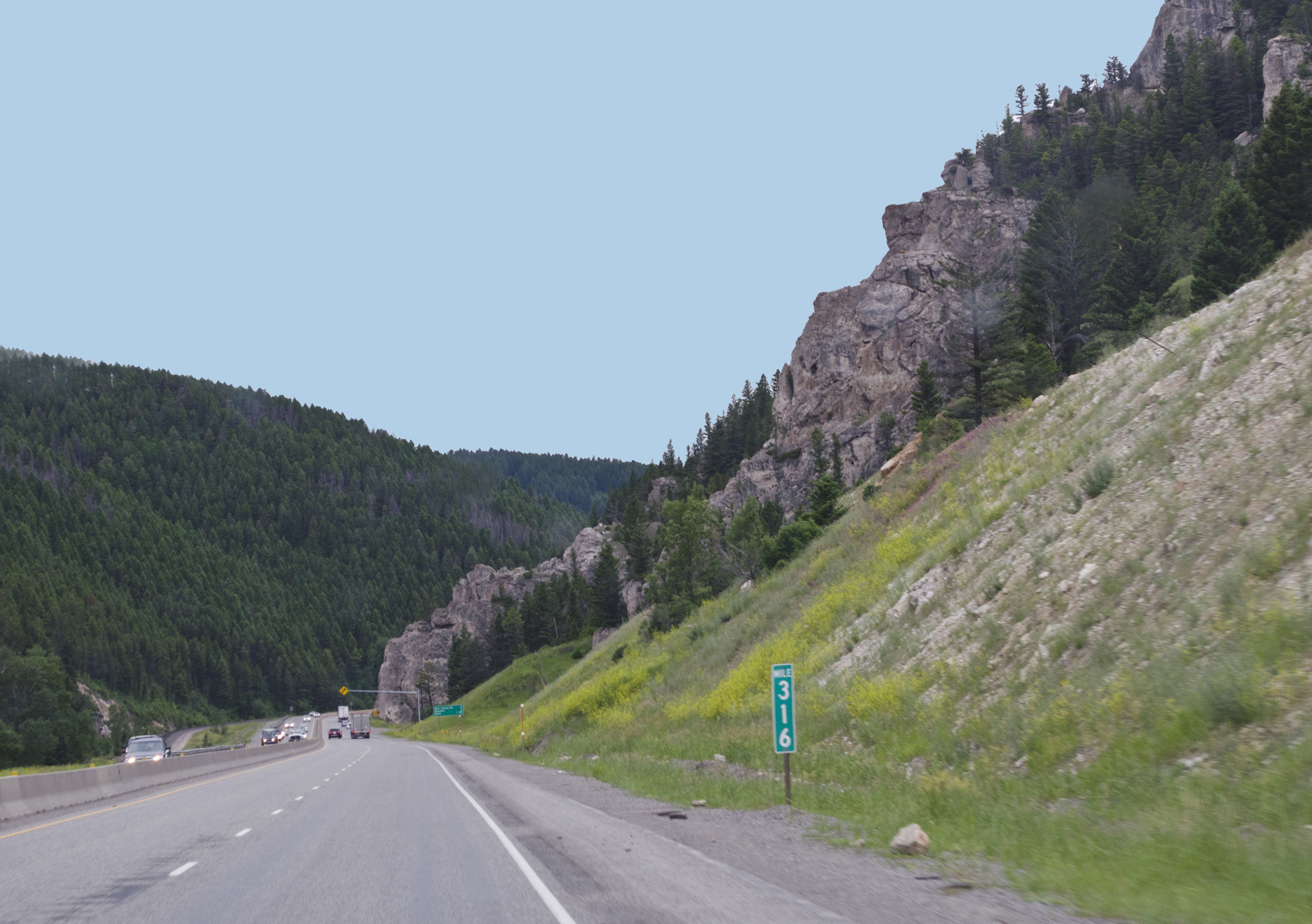
I-90 through Bozeman Pass

There is only one exit along I-90 in Broadwater County, linking MT 2 in the south and US 287 north of the highway before crossing the Broadwater–Gallatin county border at the Missouri River. I-90 parallels S-205, bypassing the towns of Trident, Logan, Manhattan, and Belgrade on the north of the highway. A new interchange was constructed just east of Belgrade (exit 299) that services Bozeman Yellowstone International Airport to the north and the western area of the city of Bozeman. MT 85 travels south from I-90 in Belgrade, providing access to Bozeman Hot Springs. The highway then enters the city of Bozeman, the county seat, and intersects and becomes concurrent with US 191. I-90 exits the county at the Gallatin–Park county border at 5,760-foot (1,760 m) high Bozeman Pass. US 89 intersects I-90 in the county seat of Livingston and passes over the Yellowstone River. The highway continues northeasterly, paralleling the river, intersecting S-295 before crossing the Park–Sweet Grass county border.

=== Sweet Grass and Stillwater counties ===
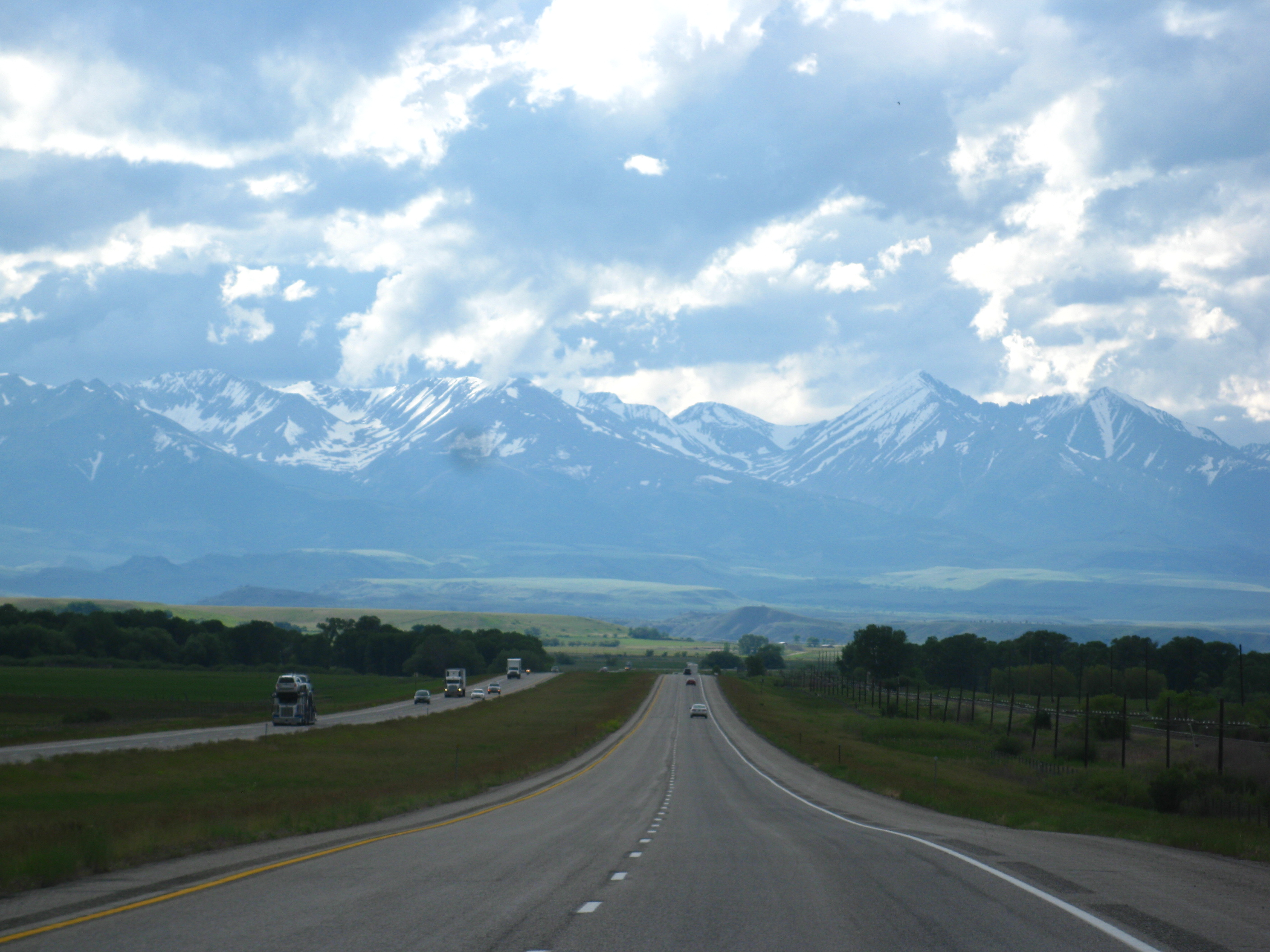
West of Park City facing west

Still paralleling the Yellowstone River, I-90 travels northwest intersecting S-298 and US 191 in the county seat of Big Timber. The highway turns back southeast, passing south of Greycliff and the Greycliff rest area, located 380.9 miles (613.0 km) from the Idaho border. The highway passes through the Sweet Grass–Stillwater county border just west of Reed Point. After passing into Stillwater County, I-90 crosses over the river, and enters the county seat of Columbus, intersecting MT 78 south of the highway and S-306 on the north side of the highway. The highway is titled the Robert E. Ewing Jr. Memorial Highway between mileposts 410 and 424. I-90 intersects the Columbus rest area, 418.8 miles (674.0 km) from the Idaho border, followed by Park City before exiting Stillwater County.

=== Yellowstone and Big Horn counties ===
US 212 becomes concurrent with I-90 just east of Laurel before entering the county seat of Billings. I-90 Business (I-90 Bus.) passes into town as the main freeway travels south of Billings and bisects Billings Heights and Lockwood intersecting MT 3 and US 87, which joins the I-90/US 212 concurrency. On the extreme eastern end of Billings, the three highways intersect the western terminus of I-94, which heads northeast toward North Dakota, while I-90 turns southeast into Big Horn County. Immediately after entering Big Horn County, the three highways pass the seasonal Hardin rest area. Entering Hardin, the county seat, the three highways intersect S-313 and MT 47. S-313 provides access to Yellowtail Dam, while MT 47 connects back to I-94. After exiting Hardin, I-90 turns south, entering the Crow Indian Reservation and intersects S-384, before reaching Crow Agency. Crow Agency is home to Little Bighorn Battlefield National Monument and Reno–Benteen Battlefield Memorial, which are passed after US 212 departs to the east. Continuing south, I-90/US 87 parallels S-451 and the Little Bighorn River, passing by Garryowen, Benteen, Lodge Grass, and Wyola before exiting the state of Montana and entering Sheridan County, Wyoming.

== History ==
I-90 replaced US 10 between Livingston and the Idaho border, and, before that, the Yellowstone Trail. Some sections of the highway follow the historic Mullan Road, a military road constructed from 1859 to 1862 between Fort Walla Walla in modern-day Washington and Fort Benton in Montana.

The section over Homestake Pass cost $18.5 million (equivalent to $136 million in 2024) to construct and was completed on October 30, 1966. The final two-lane section of the highway, near Springdale, was expanded to four lanes in May 1987.

Until 1995 in Montana near the Idaho border, I-90 was not a divided highway for a few stretches, having only a narrow paved median.

From 1995 until 1999, the daytime maximum speed limit in Montana was "reasonable and prudent". As of October 1, 2015, the daytime and nighttime speed limits on Interstate Highways are 80 mph (130 km/h) for cars and light trucks and 65 mph (105 km/h) for heavy trucks, except within urban areas, where the maximum speed limit is 65 mph (105 km/h) for all vehicles, day or night. The western 34 miles (55 km) have a lower speed limit, as well as the Missoula and Butte urban areas.

In 1996, a section of I-90 was closed for 19 days due to a train derailment and chlorine spill near Alberton.

=== Expansion of the Billings area corridor ===
The 2012 Billings area I-90 corridor planning study recommends many improvements to the corridor from Laurel through Lockwood, including construction of new east and westbound bridges over the Yellowstone River, with each bridge having three to four traffic lanes. Also recommended are construction of additional eastbound and westbound traffic lanes from Shiloh to Johnson Lane and reconstruction and widening of many of the bridges, interchanges and on/offramps along the corridor at an estimated cost of $114 million.

== Exit list ==
County	Location	mi	km	Exit	Destinations	Notes
Mineral	Lookout Pass	0.000	0.000		I-90 west – Coeur d'Alene, Spokane	Continuation into Idaho
Mineral	Lookout Pass	0.077	0.124	0	Lookout Pass	Lookout Pass Ski and Recreation Area
Mineral	Taft	5.580	8.980	5	Taft	access to St. Regis (Sohon)/Mullan Pass, St. Paul Pass Tunnel, and Route of the Hiawatha rail trail
Mineral	Saltese	10.418	16.766	10	Saltese	
Mineral	Haugan	16.541	26.620	16	Haugan	
Mineral	De Borgia	18.752	30.178	18	De Borgia	
Mineral	Henderson	21.820	35.116	22	Henderson	Old Mullan Road/Mullan Gulch Road to St. Regis
Mineral	Drexel	25.216	40.581	25	Drexel	
Mineral		26.207	42.176	26	Ward Creek Road	Eastbound exit and entrance
Mineral		29.940	48.184	30	Two Mile Road	
Mineral	St. Regis	33.240	53.495	33	MT 135 – St. Regis	seasonal access to Avery via the St. Joe River Scenic Byway
Mineral	Sloway	37.016	59.571	37	Sloway Area	
Mineral		42.247	67.990	43	Dry Creek Road	
Mineral	Superior	46.751	75.238	47	S-257 – Superior	seasonal access to Headquarters
Mineral	Lozeau	54.653	87.955	55	Lozeau, Quartz	
Mineral	Tarkio	60.971	98.123	61	Tarkio	
Mineral	Crystal Springs	64.818– 65.565	104.314– 105.517	65	Crystal Springs	
Mineral		66.055	106.305	66	Fish Creek Road	
Mineral	Cyr	69.483	111.822	70	Cyr	Westbound exit and eastbound entrance
Mineral		74.328	119.619	75	I-90 BL east – Alberton	
Missoula	Alberton	76.809	123.612	77	I-90 BL west / S-507 (Petty Creek Road) – Alberton	
Missoula		81.765	131.588	82	Nine Mile Road	
Missoula	Huson	84.325	135.708	85	S-574 – Huson	
Missoula	Frenchtown	88.888	143.051	89	S-263 – Frenchtown	Mullan Road to Missoula
Missoula	Wye	95.483	153.665	96	US 93 north / MT 200 west – Kalispell	West end of US 93 / MT 200 overlap
Missoula		99.091	159.472	99	Airway Boulevard	
Missoula	Missoula	100.867	162.330	101	I-90 BL east / US 93 south (Reserve Street) – Hamilton	East end of US 93 overlap
Missoula	Missoula	103.930	167.259	104	Orange Street	
Missoula	Missoula	104.794	168.650	105	I-90 BL west / US 12 west (Van Buren Street)	West end of US 12 overlap
Missoula	Missoula	106.419	171.265	107	East Missoula	
Missoula	Bonner	109.634	176.439	109	MT 200 east – Bonner, Great Falls	East end of MT 200 overlap
Missoula	Turah	113.519	182.691	113	Turah	
Missoula	Clinton	120.423	193.802	120	Clinton	
Missoula	Rock Creek	125.475	201.932	126	Rock Creek Road	Rock Creek Road Scenic Byway
Missoula		129.868	209.002	130	Beavertail Road	
Granite	Bearmouth	137.524	221.323	138	Bearmouth Area	
Granite	Drummond	152.802	245.911	153	MT 1 – Drummond, Philipsburg	Eastbound exit and westbound entrance
Granite	Drummond	153.727	247.400	154	To MT 1 – Drummond, Philipsburg	Westbound exit and eastbound entrance
Powell	Jens	161.637	260.130	162	Jens	
Powell	Gold Creek	165.360	266.121	166	Gold Creek	
Powell	Phosphate	169.327	272.505	170	Phosphate	
Powell	Garrison	173.471	279.175	174	US 12 east – Garrison, Helena	East end of US 12 overlap; Eastbound exit and westbound entrance
Powell	Garrison	174.656	281.082	175	To US 12 east – Garrison, Helena	No westbound entrance
Powell		178.245	286.858	179	Beck Hill Road	
Powell	Deer Lodge	183.625	295.516	184	I-90 BL east – Deer Lodge	
Powell		186.640	300.368	187	I-90 BL west – Deer Lodge	No westbound entrance
Powell	Racetrack	193.861	311.989	195	Racetrack	
Deer Lodge	Galen	196.271	315.868	197	S-273 – Galen	
Deer Lodge	Warm Springs	200.264	322.294	201	MT 48 – Warm Springs	
Deer Lodge	Opportunity	206.336	332.066	208	MT 1 – Anaconda, Opportunity	
Silver Bow		209.806	337.650	211	S-441 – Gregson, Fairmont Hot Springs	
Silver Bow	Ramsay	214.860	345.784	216	Ramsay	
Silver Bow	Nissler	217.337	349.770	219	I-15 south – Dillon, Idaho Falls	West end of I-15 overlap; I-15 exit 121
Silver Bow	Rocker	218.408	351.494	122 (Note: Exit numbers follow I-15)	Rocker	
Silver Bow	Butte	220.237	354.437	124	I-115 east / I-15 BL north / I-90 BL east – City Center	Eastbound exit and westbound entrance
Silver Bow	Butte	222.263	357.698	126	Montana Street	
Silver Bow	Butte	223.883	360.305	127	I-15 BL south / I-90 BL west (Harrison Avenue) / MT 2 east	Signed as exits 127A and 127B eastbound; I-15 Bus./I-90 Bus. not signed eastbound
Silver Bow	Butte	224.933	361.995	227	I-15 north – Helena	East end of I-15 overlap; I-15 exit 129
Silver Bow	Butte	226.785	364.975	228	Continental Drive	
Silver Bow	Homestake	231.425	372.442	233	Homestake	
Jefferson	Pipestone	240.144	386.474	241	Pipestone	
Jefferson	Whitehall	247.203	397.835	249	MT 55 to MT 69 – Whitehall	S-399 (Whitetail Road) north from this exit
Jefferson	Cardwell	254.472	409.533	256	S-359 – Cardwell, Boulder	
Jefferson		265.878	427.889	267	Milligan Canyon Road	
Broadwater		272.975	439.311	274	US 287 – Helena, Ennis	
Gallatin	Three Forks	276.514	445.006	278	MT 2 / S-205 – Three Forks, Trident	
Gallatin	Logan	281.447	452.945	283	Logan, Trident	
Gallatin	Manhattan	286.871	461.674	288	S-288 to S-346 – Manhattan, Amsterdam	
Gallatin	Belgrade	296.474	477.129	298	MT 85 / S-291 – Amsterdam, Belgrade, West Yellowstone	
Gallatin	Belgrade	297.280	478.426	299	Airway Boulevard	
Gallatin	Bozeman	303.434	488.330	305	S-412 (North 19th Avenue) / Springhill Road	
Gallatin	Bozeman	305.084	490.985	306	I-90 BL east / S-205 (North 7th Avenue) to US 191 south	
Gallatin	Bozeman	307.568	494.983	309	I-90 BL west / US 191 south (Main Street) to MT 86	West end of US 191 overlap
Gallatin		311.207	500.839	313	Bear Canyon Road	
Gallatin		314.528	506.184	316	Trail Creek Road	
Gallatin		317.428	510.851	319	Jackson Creek Road	
Gallatin		322.387	518.832	324	Ranch Access	
Park	Livingston	328.850	529.233	330	I-90 BL east – Livingston	
Park	Livingston	330.804	532.377	333	US 89 south – Yellowstone National Park, Livingston City Center, Gardiner	West end of US 89 overlap
Park	Livingston	335.752	540.340	337	I-90 BL west – Livingston	
Park		338.282	544.412	340	US 89 north – White Sulphur Springs	East end of US 89 overlap
Park		341.144	549.018	343	S-295 (Mission Creek Road)	
Park		348.308	560.547	350	East End Access	
Park		350.562	564.175	352	Ranch Access	
Sweet Grass		352.169	566.761	354	S-563 – Springdale	
Sweet Grass		359.952	579.287	362	De Hart	
Sweet Grass		365.541	588.281	367	I-90 BL east / US 191 north – Big Timber, Harlowton	East end of US 191 overlap
Sweet Grass		368.691	593.351	370	I-90 BL west to US 191 north – Big Timber, Harlowton	
Sweet Grass		375.932	605.004	377	Greycliff	
Sweet Grass		382.929	616.264	384	Bridger Creek Road	
Stillwater		390.017	627.672	392	Reed Point	
Stillwater		394.893	635.519	396	Ranch Access	
Stillwater		398.526	641.365	400	Springtime Road	
Stillwater		406.813	654.702	408	MT 78 – Columbus, Absarokee	
Stillwater		424.583	683.300	426	Park City	
Yellowstone		430.920	693.499	432	I-90 BL east – West Laurel	
Yellowstone	Laurel	432.039	695.299	434	US 212 west / US 310 – Laurel, Red Lodge	West end of US 212 overlap
Yellowstone		435.439	700.771	437	I-90 BL west / South Frontage Road – East Laurel	
Yellowstone	Billings	441.444	710.435	443	Zoo Drive, Shiloh Road	
Yellowstone	Billings	443.910	714.404	446	I-90 BL east / King Avenue West / Mullowney Lane – West Billings	
Yellowstone	Billings	445.150	716.399	447	South Billings Boulevard	
Yellowstone	Billings	448.056	721.076	450	MT 3 (27th Street)	
Yellowstone	Lockwood	450.817	725.520	452	I-90 BL west / US 87 north – Roundup, Lockwood	West end of US 87 overlap
Yellowstone	Lockwood	453.263	729.456	455	Johnson Lane	
Yellowstone	Lockwood	454.264	731.067	456	I-94 east – Miles City, Bismarck	I-94 west to 90 east exit 0; western terminus of I-94
Yellowstone		460.132	740.511	462	Pryor Creek Road	
Yellowstone		467.594	752.520	469	Arrow Creek Road	
Big Horn		476.564	766.955	478	Fly Creek Road	
Big Horn		482.327	776.230	484	Frontage Road – Toluca	
Big Horn	Hardin	493.863	794.795	495	I-90 BL east / MT 47 to S-313 – Hardin City Center	
Big Horn	Hardin	495.455	797.358	497	I-90 BL west (Third Street) to S-384 / S-313 – Hardin	
Big Horn		501.149	806.521	503	Dunmore	
Big Horn		507.093	816.087	509	Crow Agency	
Big Horn		508.758	818.767	510	US 212 east – Little Bighorn Battlefield, Broadus	East end of US 212 overlap
Big Horn		512.638	825.011	514	S-451 – Garryowen	
Big Horn		528.564	850.641	530	S-463 – Lodge Grass	
Big Horn		541.924	872.142	544	Wyola	
Big Horn		547.796	881.592	549	Aberdeen	
Big Horn		554.105	891.746		I-90 east / US 87 south – Sheridan, Rapid City	Continuation into Wyoming
1.000 mi = 1.609 km; 1.000 km = 0.621 mi: Concurrency terminus; Incomplete access

== See also ==
Interstate 90
Previous state: Idaho	Montana	Next state: Wyoming
