= Montana Highway 48 =

Highway in Montana

Montana Highway 48
- MT 48 highlighted in red

Route information
- Maintained by MDT
- Length: 6.839 mi (11.006 km)
- Existed: 1938–present

Major junctions
- West end: MT 1 near Anaconda
- East end: I-90 near Warm Springs

Location
- Country: United States
- State: Montana
- Counties: Deer Lodge

Highway system
- Montana Highway System; Interstate; US; State; Secondary
| ← MT 47 | → MT 49 |

Montana State Highway 48 (MT 48) is a 6.839-mile (11.006 km) state highway in Deer Lodge County, Montana, United States. The highway is 6.839 miles (11.006 km) long, and connects MT 1 to Interstate 90, passing mainly through rural mining areas. MT 48 was first designated in 1938, although portions of a highway existed in the location of MT 48 by at least 1924.

== Route description ==
MT 48 begins at an intersection with MT 1 as a two-lane, paved road. The highway proceeds northeastward through rural mining land for a short distance before intersecting S-273. The roadway continues northeast, running parallel to Warm Springs Creek. After a short distance, the highway passes Bowman Field and several small reservoirs that were created for mining. The road proceeds northeastward through more rural mining land before slightly bending eastward. The highway continues in a slight northeastward direction near the town of Warm Springs, crossing the Montana Western Railway. The highway proceeds to its eastern terminus at an intersection with Interstate 90's frontage road near exit 201.

The Montana Department of Transportation's average daily traffic count for MT 48 is 1445 vehicles, of which 113 are trucks. No portion of the highway is listed as part of the National Highway System (NHS), a network of roads important to the country's economy, defense, and mobility.

== History ==
A short stretch of MT 48 near what would become MT 1 existed by at least 1924. By 1927, a short, dirt, unimproved connector road existed near the location of MT 48. By at least 1937, that route had been paved, and connected U.S. Route 10 (US 10, now MT 1) to US 10S (now I-90). MT 48 was officially designated on May 16, 1938. By 1949, all but 0.046 miles (0.074 km) of MT 48 had been reconstructed along its current route. US 10 had been renumbered as US 10A by 1951. Since then, both segments of US 10 have been redesignated and improved. In 1978, the final 0.046 miles (0.074 km) of the highway was reconstructed. MT 48 has not been worked on since.

== Major junctions ==
The entire route is in Deer Lodge County.

| Location | mi | km | Destinations | Notes |
|---|---|---|---|---|
| | 0.000 | 0.000 | MT 1 east (Pintler Veterans Memorial Scenic Highway) – Opportunity, I-90 MT 1 west (Pintler Veterans Memorial Scenic Highway) – Anaconda | Western terminus; T intersection |
| | 0.260 | 0.418 | S-273 north (Galen Road) – Galen, I-90 | T intersection Southern terminus of S-273 |
| Warm Springs | 6.839 | 11.006 | I-90 north – Galen, Deer Lodge, Missoula I-90 south – MT 1, Fairmont Hot Springs, Butte | Eastern terminus; Diamond interchange |
| Warm Springs | 6.839 | 11.006 | Gas City Road east | Continuation east beyond eastern terminus |
1.000 mi = 1.609 km; 1.000 km = 0.621 mi
