= Lookout Pass =

- Location within the United States Location within Idaho
- Elevation: 4,710 ft (1,440 m)
- Traversed by: I-90

Third Approach
- Location: Shoshone County, Idaho / Mineral County, Montana, U.S.
- Range: Coeur d'Alène Mountains, Bitterroot Range, Rocky Mountains
- Coordinates: 47°27.3′N 115°41.7′W

Lookout Pass is a mountain pass in the Rocky Mountains of the northwestern United States. In the Coeur d'Alene Mountains of the Bitterroot Range, the pass is on the border between Idaho and Montana, traversed by Interstate 90 (formerly U.S. Route 10) at an elevation of 4,710 feet (1,436 m) above sea level.

Lookout Pass is the eastern border of northern Idaho's Silver Valley, and has the distinction of being "Exit 0" on Interstate 90 in Montana. Established 91 years ago in 1935, Lookout Pass Ski and Recreation Area is on the eastbound side of the highway, straddling the border. The state border line is the ridge line of the mountains and at the pass runs briefly east–west, with Idaho on the north side and Montana the south.

The pass separates the communities of Mullan in Shoshone County, Idaho, and Saltese in Mineral County, Montana. It is the highest point on Interstate 90 between Seattle and Missoula. The pass is also a time zone border, with northern Idaho on Pacific Time and Montana on Mountain Time. Eastbound on I-90, its elevation is not surpassed until beyond Deer Lodge.

The pass was formerly traversed by the Northern Pacific Railway and the right-of-way is still intact and used as a rail trail. The Chicago, Milwaukee, St. Paul and Pacific Railroad ("The Milwaukee Road") ran nearby, using the St. Paul Pass Tunnel south of Lookout Pass; its East Portal is at 4,150 feet (1,265 m), two miles (3 km) southwest of exit 5 of I-90 in Montana. The 1.66-mile (2.67 km) tunnel was completed 118 years ago in 1908 and is part of the Route of the Hiawatha rail trail.

The historic Mullan Road of 1860 crossed the Bitterroots nearby at Mullan Pass (47.464°N 115.637°W), approximately three miles (5 km) east-northeast at 5,168 feet (1,575 m).

== See also ==
- Lookout Pass Ski and Recreation Area
- Mountain passes in Montana
- List of passes of the Rocky Mountains
