= Saltese, Montana =

Saltese, Montana Packers Meadow Silver City
- Census-designated place
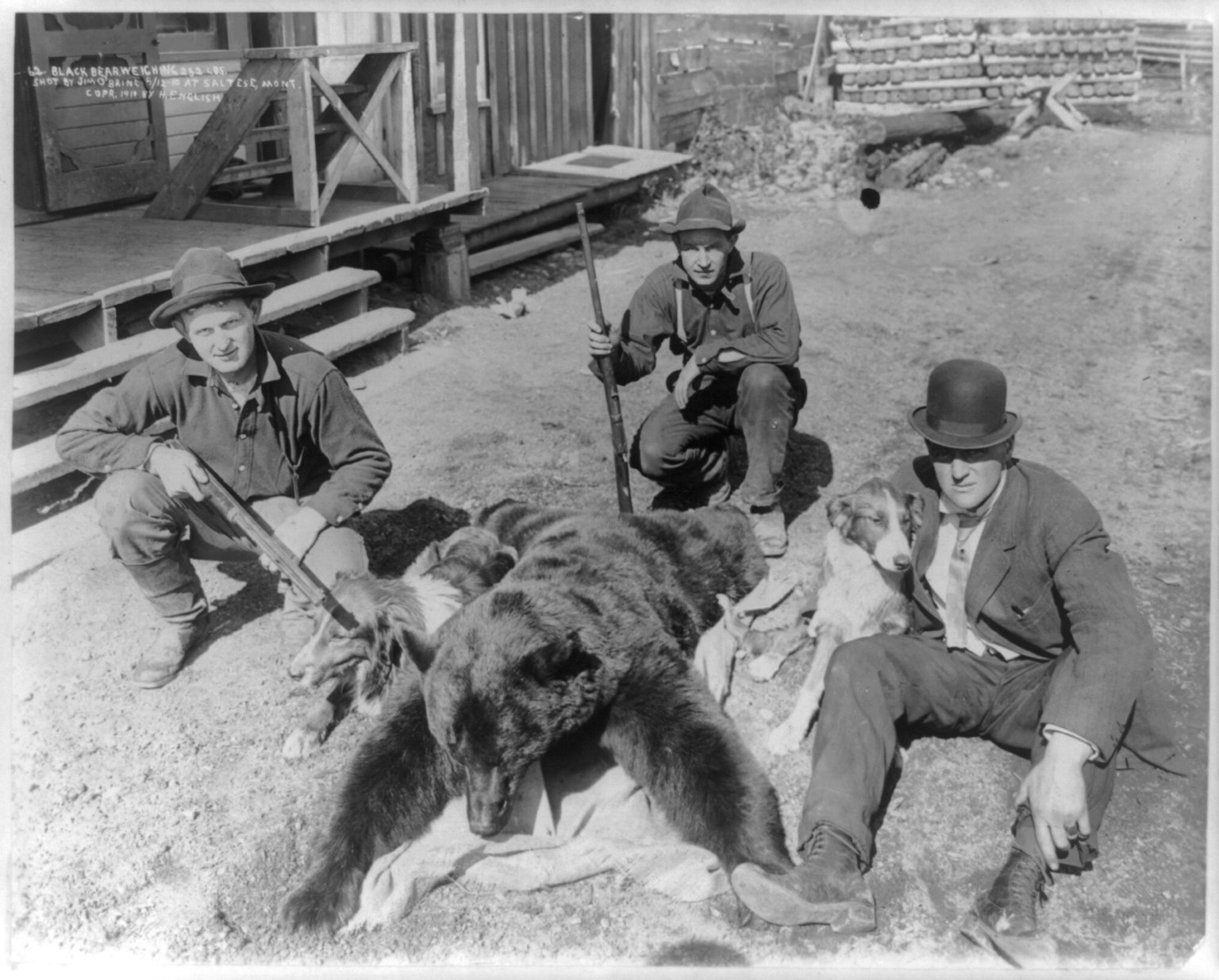
- Black bear weighing 252 lbs. shot by Jim O'Brine at Saltese, Montana, May 12, 1910
- Coordinates: 47°24′41″N 115°30′43″W
- Country: United States
- State: Montana
- County: Mineral
- Named after: Chief Saltese

Area
  - Total: 0.33 sq mi (0.85 km^{2})
  - Land: 0.33 sq mi (0.85 km^{2})
  - Water: 0 sq mi (0.00 km^{2})
- Elevation: 3,389 ft (1,033 m)

Population (2020)
  - Total: 10
  - Density: 30.4/sq mi (11.75/km^{2})
- Time zone: UTC-7 (MST)
  - Summer (DST): UTC-6 (MDT)
- ZIP Code: 59867
- Area Code: 406
- FIPS code: 30-65875
- GNIS feature ID: 2806650

Saltese (also Packers Meadow or Silver City) is an unincorporated community and census-designated place in Mineral County, Montana, United States. It lies in the valley of the St. Regis River along Interstate 90 at exit 10. As of the 2020 census, the population was 10.

== History ==
Saltese is an old gold and silver mining town that took its name from a Nez Perce leader, Chief Saltese. The town was first known as Silver City but was renamed in 1891. The post office opened in 1892.

In December 1912, David D. Bogart, the sixth mayor of Missoula, Montana, was killed in an avalanche in Saltese while prospecting for gold.

In 1996, a longtime establishment, the Old Montana Bar and Grille, was destroyed in a fire.

== Geography ==
Saltese is in northwestern Mineral County at an elevation of 3,370 feet (1,030 m) in the narrow valley of the St. Regis River, where it is joined by Packer Creek from the north and by Silver Creek from the south. The St. Regis is a southeast-flowing tributary of the Clark Fork River. Interstate 90 passes through the community, leading southeast 36 miles (58 km) to Superior, the Mineral county seat, and northwest over Lookout Pass 16 miles (26 km) to Mullan, Idaho.

According to the U.S. Census Bureau, the Saltese CDP has an area of 0.33 square miles (0.85 km^{2}), all of it recorded as land.

== Demographics ==
Historical population
Census	Pop.	Note	%±
2020	10		—
U.S. Decennial Census
