= MWRR =

MWRR may stand for:

- Montana Western Railway (1986–2003)
- Money-weighted rate of return
