= Mullan Road =

- U.S. National Register of Historic Places
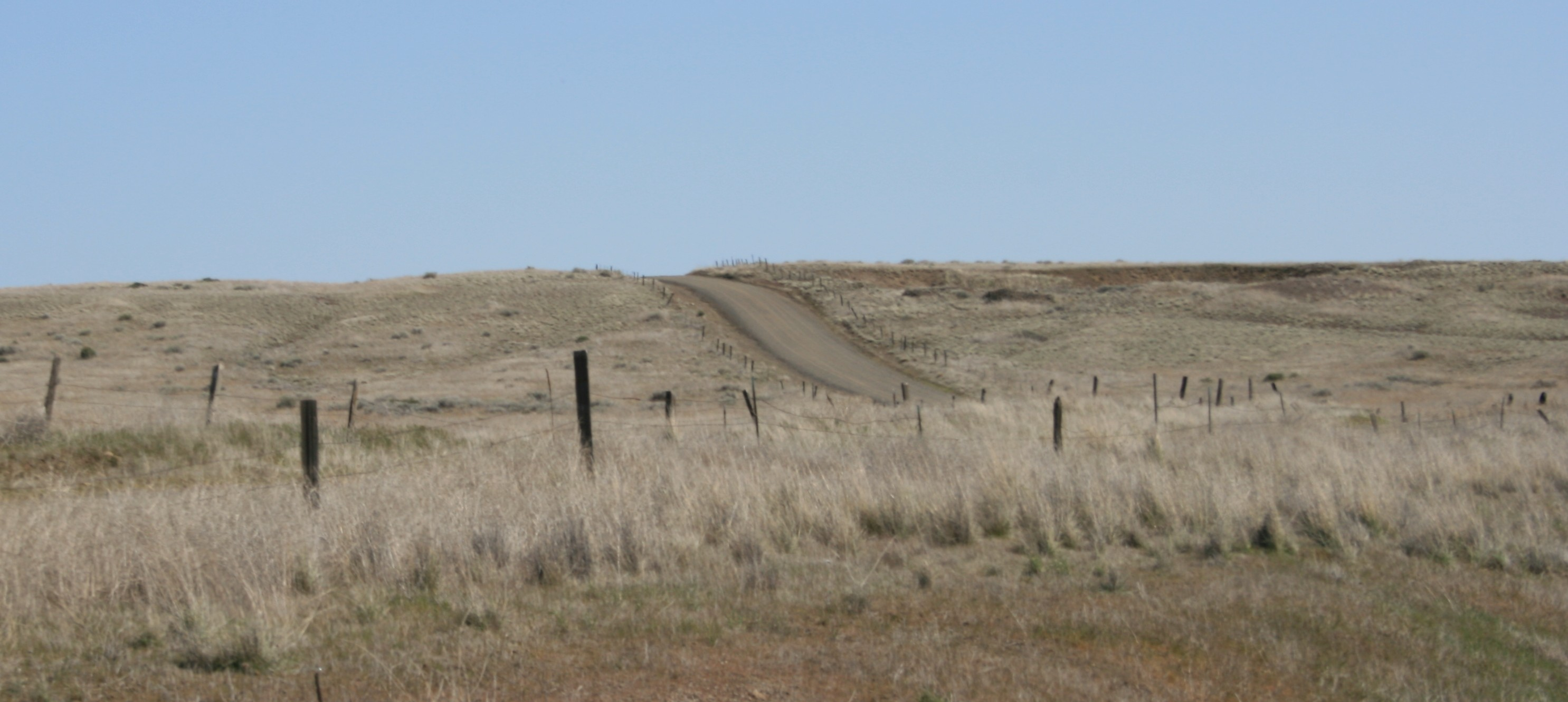
- Looking north at one of the few remaining gravel stretches of the Mullan Road as it crosses Washington State Route 26 near Washtucna, Washington. The portion south of SR 26 has reverted to grazing.
- Nearest city: St. Maries, Idaho; Coeur d'Alene, Idaho; Mullan, Idaho; St. Regis, Montana; Missoula, Montana; Helena, Montana; Great Falls, Montana
- Built: 1853, 173 years ago
- NRHP reference No.: 90000548
- Added to NRHP: April 5, 1990

Mullan Road was the first wagon road to cross the Rocky Mountains to the Inland of the Pacific Northwest. It was built by U.S. Army troops under the command of Lt. John Mullan, between the spring of 1859 and summer 1860. It led from Fort Benton, which at the time was in the Dakota Territory, then Idaho Territory from July 1863, and into Montana Territory beginning in May 1864. The road eventually stretched all the way from Fort Walla Walla, Washington Territory, near the Columbia River to the navigational head of the Missouri River, which at the time was the farthest inland port in the world). The road previewed the route approximately followed by modern-day Interstate 15 and Interstate 90 through present-day Montana, Idaho, and Washington.

Parts of the Mullan Road can still be traveled; one such section is near Washtucna, Washington.

A segment of the Mullan Road in the vicinity of Benton Lake was listed on the National Register of Historic Places in 1975, and the American Society of Civil Engineers designated it a National Historic Civil Engineering Landmark in 1977. Three segments of the road in Idaho were also listed on the National Register in 1990. In 2009, the Point of Rocks segment in Montana was also listed on the National Register as part of the Point of Rocks Historic Transportation Corridor.

== History ==
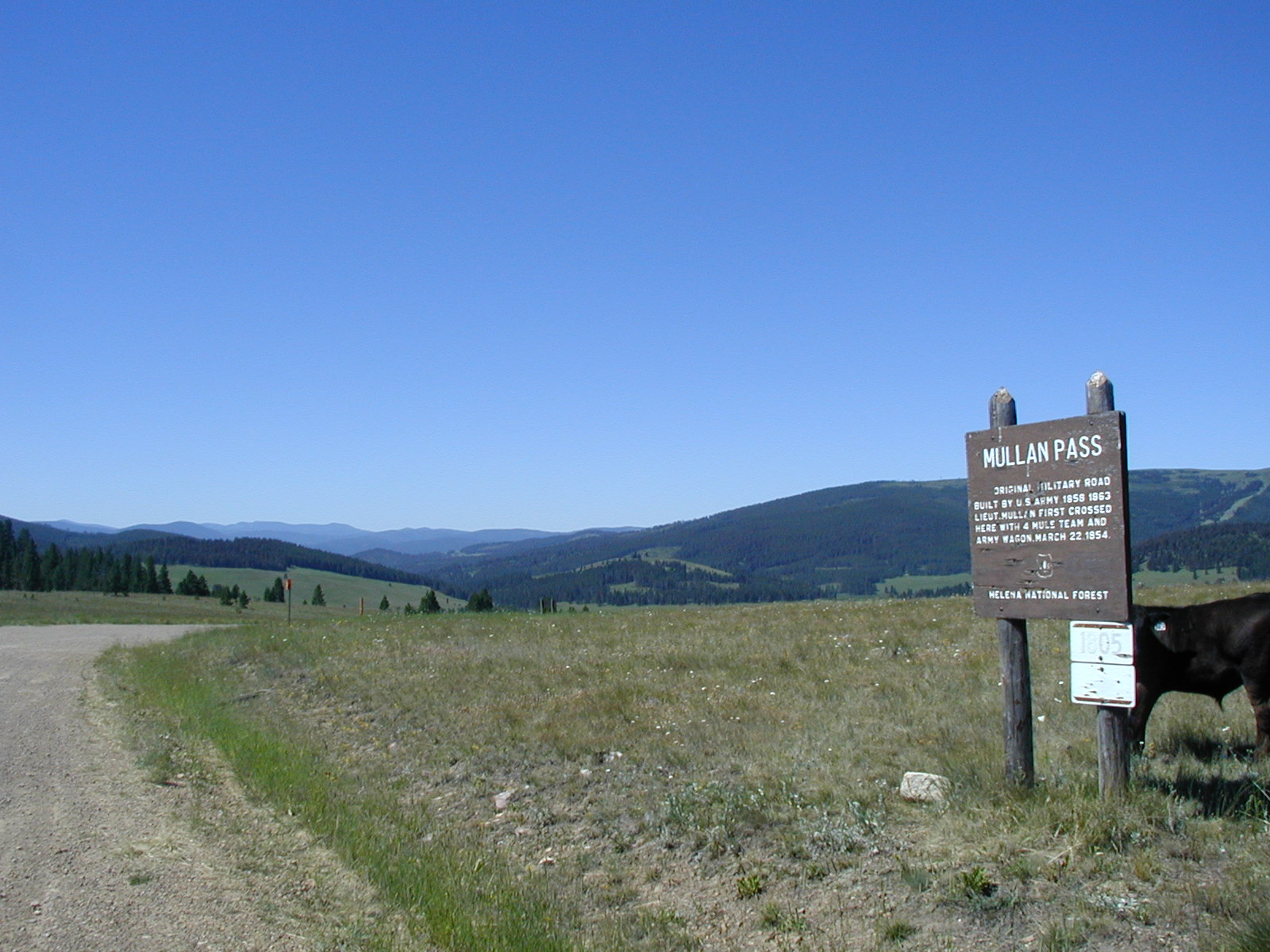
Mullan Pass near Helena, Montana

As early as 1852 the US government began to think about building an overland route to the Pacific Ocean to help settle the area with pioneers and eliminate any claims that France, England or Russia had on the disputed territories. Despite the Lewis and Clark expedition, little detail was known about the country. Isaac Ingalls Stevens, a West Point graduate appointed the first governor of the Washington Territory, was ordered to survey a route from the Missouri River to the Columbia River suitable for building a railroad. Stevens assumed the task, but also kept in mind that the route should be suitable for a wagon road.

In the spring of 1853, Congress authorized a U.S. Army expedition, led by Stevens. It was made up of engineers and explorers; they organized near St. Paul, Minnesota. They were to detail the geographical and topographical character of the country. Among them was a small, dark-haired young man, Lieutenant John Mullan; just a year out of West Point, he was anxious to prove his mettle as an engineer.

Mullan was placed in charge of surveying, and later improving, a wagon route (now commonly called the Mullan Road) between Fort Benton (Montana) and Fort Walla Walla (Washington). Lieutenant Mullan, a topographical engineer, began gathering information in 1854. Delayed by the Yakima War which ended in 1858, construction began in 1859 from Fort Walla Walla in what was then Washington Territory. Lieutenant Mullan commanded a workforce of more than 200, including civilian workers, surveyors, engineers, and soldiers who carved a 25-foot-wide (7.6 m) road across the region.

After the difficult project was completed in 1860, floods wiped out substantial stretches of the road. It was re-routed in 1861. Floods again damaged the road, and ultimately, no provision for maintenance was provided.

Although the road was never heavily used by the military, it was an important conduit for civilian passage, which hastened settling of the northwestern United States. In the first year after completion, it was used by an estimated 20,000 people, 6,000 horses and mules, 5,000 cattle and 83 wagons. The discovery of gold in North Central Idaho in 1860 by Capt. E.D. Pierce contributed to this usage, making Lewiston, Washington Territory, the largest town in the Pacific Northwest and the capital of the new Idaho Territory beginning July 4, 1863. The Mullan Road helped Walla Walla become the largest town in Washington Territory by 1870, with a population of 1,394. The road continued to serve as an important route until the completion of the Northern Pacific Railroad in 1883 provided faster and more convenient access to the region.

== Route of the Mullan Road ==
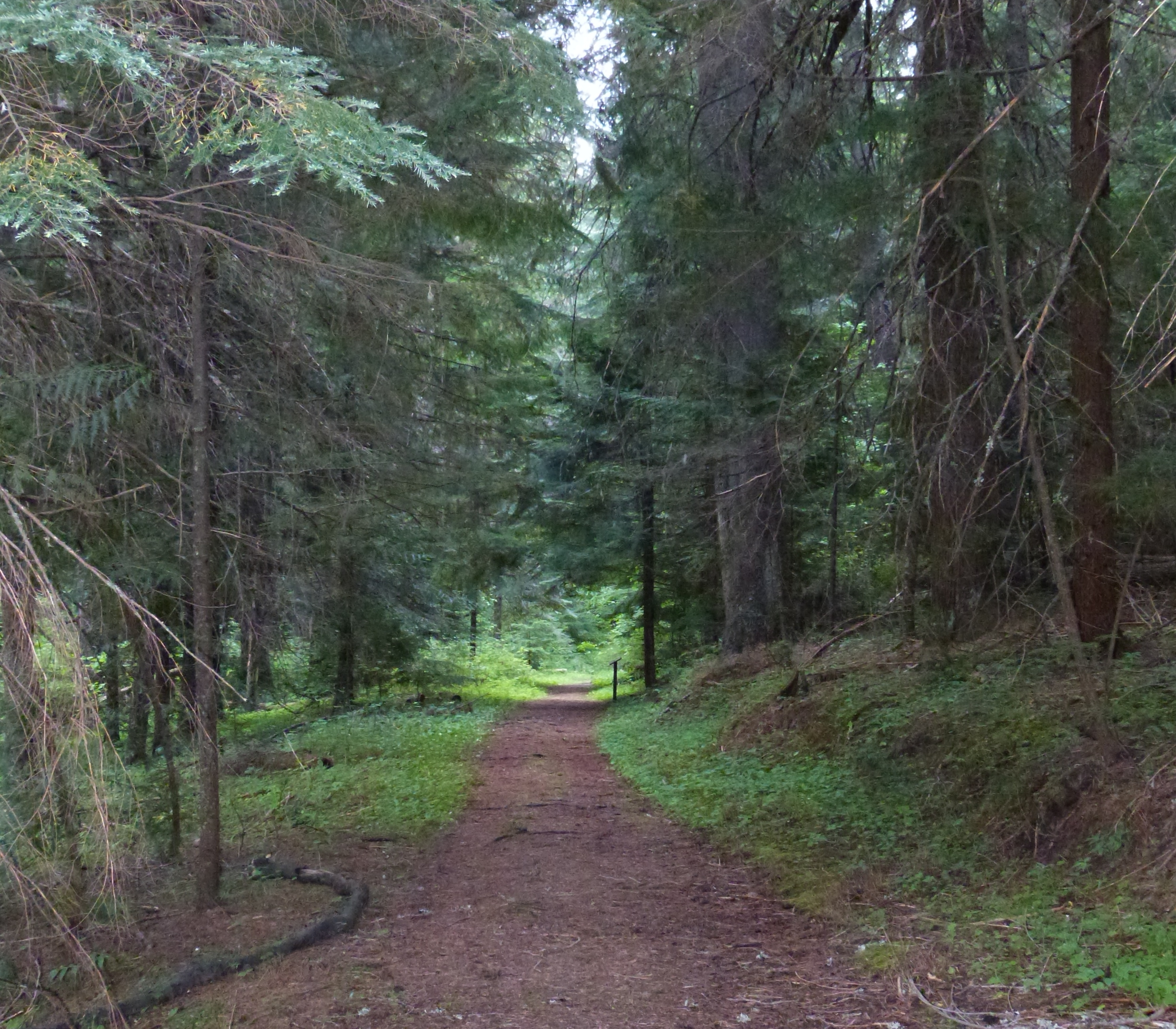
A portion of the Mullan Road over Fourth of July Pass is listed on the National Register of Historic Places

From the origin at Fort Benton, Montana, the Mullan Road proceeded:

- West from Fort Benton, it passed north of Great Falls
- Dropping south to cross the continental divide west of Helena (following a path through Mullan Pass at 5,902 feet (1,799 m), immediately north of that now traveled by US 12)
- Just west of Garrison, it joined the route used by the future US 10 (present-day Interstate 90) (similar to the US 12 transition to join Interstate 90 today)
- Along the Clark Fork River near the ghost town of Bearmouth, also along the future US 10
- It remained with the future US 10 route as it passed through Missoula, proceeding west through Montana. The Mullan Road through the Missoula Valley, slightly south of the former US 10 and still in use today as S-263, fostered rapid growth for the burgeoning city, and allowed the U.S. Army to establish Fort Missoula in 1877. One stretch from St. Regis to Henderson north of today's Interstate 90 is still in use as Old Mullan Road and Mullan Gulch Road.
- From the Taft area, it crossed the Bitterroot Range into Idaho over St. Regis Pass (named Sohon Pass by John Mullan) (47.450°N 115.721°W) at 4,926 feet (1,501 m), about one point three miles (2 km) west-southwest of Lookout Pass, where I-90 crosses the state line.
- From the middle of the Idaho crossing, the road deviates from present-day major roads. The Mullan Road went southwesterly in Idaho to pass south of Lake Coeur d'Alene

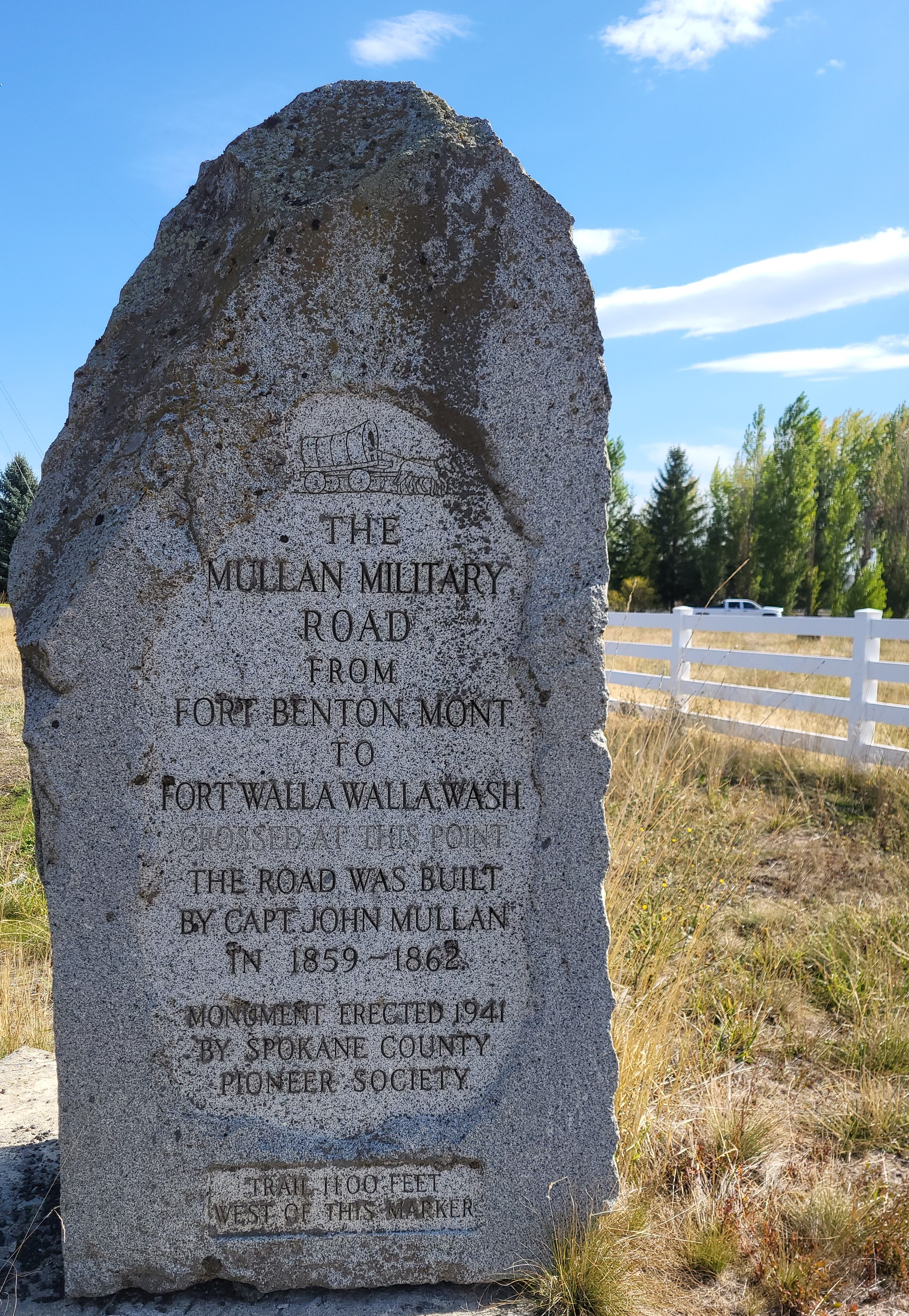
Mullan Military Road monument south of Spokane, Washington, at the intersection of E Excelsior Rd and S Monument Ln

- The road then passed into Washington some distance south of Spokane
- From there, the Mullan Road passed through the Palouse country and then the scablands of eastern Washington.
- It passed through Benge, that section of the road was completed May 22, 1861; the wagon ruts were still visible in 2008, just northeast of town at the site of the First Benge School.
- South of Benge, there is a stretch of the former road still labeled 'Mullan Road.' This gravel section travels southwesterly until it meets State Route 26 near Washtucna.
- The portion of Mullan Road south of SR 26 in Washington, which follows the course of the Palouse River as it descends to the Snake River, has been reverted to grazing and is not accessible to the public.
- After crossing the Snake River near the confluence with the Palouse River, the Mullan Road continues south along the Fort Walla Walla Fort Colville Military Road to its terminus at Fort Walla Walla near Walla Walla.
