= Ramsay, Montana =

Coordinates: 46°00′21″N 112°41′10″W

Ramsay is a settlement in Silver Bow County, Montana. It is located 10 miles west of Butte. Ramsay lies off exit 216 on Interstate 90. The ZIP Code for Ramsay is 59748.

During World War I, a dynamite manufacturing plant was built to supply the copper mines at Butte. A planned community for its workers was built as well. The post office opened in 1916. In 1921, DuPont closed the plant and laid off all the workers.
