= Rocker, Butte =

Suburb of Butte, Montana, United States

Coordinates: 46°0′12″N 112°36′22″W

Rocker is a suburb of Butte, Montana, United States. It is located three miles west of Butte.

Rocker is best known for its two truck stops, one each on the north and south side of the highway. There is a nearby Port of Montana transportation hub near the intersection of Interstates 15 and 90.

Rocker has approximately 150 citizens. There is a small volunteer fire station, but the town relies on the Butte Silver Bow Sheriff's Department and the Montana Highway Patrol for police, and the St James Hospital in Butte, two miles away, for medical services. One mile south on I-15 is Silver Bow, a Montana transportation hub, which is served by cargo trains and semis.
