= Montana Highway 1 =

State highway in Deer Lodge and Granite counties, Montana, United States

Montana Highway 1
- Pintler Veterans' Memorial Scenic Highway; Pintler Scenic Loop
- MT 1 highlighted in red

Route information
- Maintained by MDT
- Length: 63.652 mi (102.438 km)
- Existed: October 9, 1922–present

Major junctions
- South end: I-90 near Opportunity
- MT 48 in Anaconda; MT 38 in Porter's Corner
- North end: I-90 in Drummond

Location
- Country: United States
- State: Montana
- Counties: Deer Lodge, Granite

Highway system
- Montana Highway System; Interstate; US; State; Secondary
| ← US 287 | → US 2 |

Montana State Highway 1 (MT 1) is a state highway in Deer Lodge and Granite counties in southwestern Montana, United States, extending west and north from the Anaconda I-90 Junction, through Anaconda and Philipsburg, to Drummond. Both the beginning and endpoints of the road are on Interstate 90. It is known as the Pintler Veterans' Memorial Scenic Highway, or, informally, the Pintler Scenic Loop. It also provides access to the communities near Georgetown Lake.

MT 1 was one of the first roads to be paved in its entirety in Montana and has seen many changes over the years. The Philipsburg Valley and Georgetown Lake are found along this route as it winds its way through Mountain Landscapes, Open Meadows and Scenic Valleys in this part of southwestern Montana and gains significant elevation in certain places. The highway connects to the Interstate again at the end of this scenic loop. Montana Highway 1 was formerly designated as U.S. Highway 10 Alternate (US 10 ALT). It received its current number after US 10 was decommissioned through the area in 1986.

== History ==
U.S. Highway 10A
- Location: Opportunity–Drummond
- Length: 63.5 mi (102.2 km)
- Existed: c. 1937–c. 1986

MT 1 was first designated on October 9, 1922, near its present location. By 1924, its route had been designated as part of the National Parks Highway Auto Trail. This route followed the general path of MT 1, traveling from Opportunity through Anaconda and Philipsburg to Drummond. The overall length of the routing was approximately 76 miles (122 km), and was generally an unimproved dirt road. By the next year, the National Parks Highway had been rerouted away from this route. The unsigned MT 1 had been rerouted, now with an overall length of approximately 78 miles (126 km). Also by 1925, the portion of MT 1 traveling from its southern terminus to Anaconda had been paved. Also, the section of the highway near the town of Brown traveling to Stone had been graded, while the rest of the route remained unimproved dirt. By at least 1927, MT 1 had been rerouted, with an overall length of approximately 71 miles (114 km), and the portion of the highway traveling from Stone to its northern terminus had been graded. At least two years later, the entire length of the route had been graded. In 1934, the portion of MT 1 that traveled from modern-day milepost 24.190 to the Deer Lodge–Granite County border was reconstructed along its current route.

By 1937, MT 1 had been concurrently numbered as US 10, and later that year, US 10 was rerouted, and MT 1 was renumbered as US 10 ALT. Also by that time, the route had been rerouted so that the overall length was approximately 70 miles (110 km), and the entire length of the route had at least a graded gravel surface. By 1948, the portion of the route that traveled from Philipsburg to Drummond had been paved. In 1951, the entire length of MT 1/US 10 ALT was paved, with an overall length of approximately 66 miles (106 km). Also, the portion of MT 1/US 10 ALT traveling from present day mileposts 9.426 to 9.940 was reconstructed along its current route. In 1957, the sections of MT 1/US 10 ALT traveling from modern route mileposts 16.757 to 21.934 and 30.703 to 38.405 were reconstructed along the present route. In 1960, the portions of the highway traveling from current mileposts 21.935 to 24.189 and 38.406 to 48.106 were reconstructed along the present road. The next year, the portion of MT 1/US 10 ALT traveling from the junction with S-441 to the junction with Elm Street (U-203) were rebuilt along the highway's present location. In 1964, the portion of the road traveling from the southern terminus to the junction with S-441 were reconstructed to the present day routing. Two years later, the portion traveling from modern milepost 62.323 to the northern terminus were reconstructed. In 1975, the portion traveling from Elm Street to Sycamore Street (U-201) was reconstructed to the modern route. In 1976, the route had an approximate length of 63.5 miles (102.2 km).

In 1986, U.S. Route 10 was replaced in Montana by Interstate 90. This caused the removal of the concurrent U.S. Route 10 Alternate numbering from MT 1. In 2000, the portion of MT 1 traveling from modern mileposts 48.107 to 62.322 was reconstructed to the current routing. In 2008, the small portion traveling from mileposts 10.058 to 16.756 was reconstructed. The route has not been changed since.

== Major intersections ==
| County | Location | mi | km | Destinations | Notes |
|---|---|---|---|---|---|
| Deer Lodge | | 0.000 | 0.000 | I-90 | Exit 208 on I-90 |
| Deer Lodge | Anaconda–Opportunity line | 2.772 | 4.461 | S-441 | |
| Deer Lodge | Anaconda–Opportunity line | 4.390 | 7.065 | S-274 (Mill Creek Road) | |
| Deer Lodge | | 5.546 | 8.925 | MT 48 | Western terminus of MT 48 |
| Granite | Porter's Corner | 31.463 | 50.635 | MT 38 (Skalkaho Pass Road) | Eastern terminus of MT 38 |
| Granite | Philipsburg | 38.219 | 61.508 | S-348 | |
| Granite | Hall | 57.213 | 92.075 | S-513 / S-512 | |
| Granite | Drummond | 63.652 | 102.438 | I-90 | Exit 153 on I-90 |
1.000 mi = 1.609 km; 1.000 km = 0.621 mi

== See also ==
- List of state highways in Montana
