= Springdale, Montana =

Unincorporated community in Montana, United States

- Census-designated place & Unincorporated community
- Location within Montana Location within the United States
- Coordinates: 45°44′17″N 110°13′25″W
- Country: United States
- State: Montana
- County: Park

Area
  - Total: 0.13 sq mi (0.34 km^{2})
  - Land: 0.13 sq mi (0.34 km^{2})
  - Water: 0 sq mi (0.00 km^{2})
- Elevation: 4,236 ft (1,291 m)

Population (2020)
  - Total: 40
  - Density: 302.5/sq mi (116.81/km^{2})
- Time zone: UTC-7 (Mountain (MST))
  - Summer (DST): UTC-6 (MDT)
- ZIP code: 59082
- Area code: 406
- GNIS feature ID: 2583850

Springdale is a census-designated place and unincorporated community in Park County, Montana, United States. As of the 2020 census, Springdale had a population of 40. The community is located near Interstate 90 and the Yellowstone River. Springdale has its own ZIP code, 59082.

== History ==
The community was founded in the area of a hot spring by rancher Cyrus B. Mendenhall in 1882. Springdale had a post office from 1885 until 2004.

== Climate ==
This climatic region is typified by large seasonal temperature differences, with warm to hot (and often humid) summers and cold (sometimes severely cold) winters. According to the Köppen Climate Classification system, Springdale has a humid continental climate, abbreviated "Dfb" on climate maps.

== Demographics ==
Historical population
Census	Pop.	Note	%±
2020	40		—
U.S. Decennial Census
