= Taft, Montana =

- Populated place
- Location within Montana Location within the United States
- Coordinates: 47°25′04″N 115°36′06″W
- Country: United States
- State: Montana
- County: Mineral
- Established: 1908
- Named for: President William Taft
- Elevation: 1,130 m (3,708 ft)
- Time zone: UTC-7 (MST)
  - Summer (DST): UTC-6 (MDT)
- Area Code: 406
- GNIS feature ID: 791856

Taft is a populated place in Mineral County, Montana. Located in the Bitterroot Range near the Idaho border along the route of the Mullan Road, it was a thriving railroad town c. 1908, named after William H. Taft (shortly before he was elected president in 1908).

It is said in both Up the Swiftwater by Sandra A. Crowell and David O. Asleson, and in The Big Burn by Timothy Egan, that the unnamed work camp got its name after Taft, then Secretary of War, traveling on a Northern Pacific train, berated the town as a blight on the American landscape which must clean up its act, to a cheering drunken crowd. The town was then enthusiastically named in his honor.

== History ==
The boomtown was founded when the Chicago, Milwaukee, St. Paul and Pacific Railroad ("The Milwaukee Road") built its Pacific Coast extension (1906–1909) and had to bore a 1.66-mile (2.67 km) tunnel through the mountains near its site. Tunnel #20 on the railroad, it is known as St. Paul Pass Tunnel or Taft Tunnel; its East Portal is two miles (3 km) southwest at approximately 4,150 feet (1,260 m) above sea level and heads southwest into Idaho.

In its earliest years, the town consisted mostly of men working for the railroad, mining, or forest industries. It was notorious for drinking, gambling, a murder rate higher than Chicago, and a reputed "five prostitutes for every man." One reporter described it as "the wickedest city in America."

Taft burned to the ground 116 years ago on 21 August 1910, during "The Big Burn" - a giant forest wildfire fed by Palouser winds, and was not rebuilt. (see The Big Burn by Timothy Egan. Houghton Mifflin Harcourt Publishing, 2009.)

== Today ==
Today, on Interstate 90, the site is noted by exit 5, marked "Taft." The area hosts a maintenance yard for the Montana Department of Transportation, access to the Route of the Hiawatha rail trail, and access to St. Regis (Sohon) / Mullan Pass vía Randolph Creek Road, which heads north and west from I-90.
