= Warm Springs, Montana =

Unincorporated community in Montana, United States

- Unincorporated community
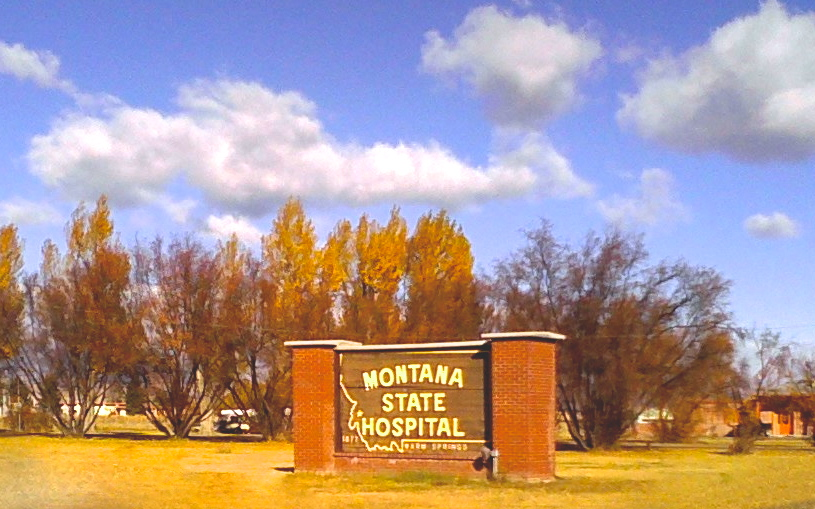
- Montana State Hospital entrance

- Location within Montana Location within the United States
- Coordinates: 46°10′53″N 112°47′05″W
- Country: United States
- State: Montana
- County: Deer Lodge
- Elevation: 4,813 ft (1,467 m)
- Time zone: UTC-7 (Mountain (MST))
  - Summer (DST): UTC-6 (MDT)
- Area code: 406
- GNIS feature ID: 806822

Warm Springs is an unincorporated community in Deer Lodge County, Montana, United States. The town can be accessed via exit 201 on Interstate 90.

The post office opened in 1871.

== Description ==
The community is the site of Montana State Hospital, the only long-term psychiatric hospital operated by the state of Montana. The hospital was founded by the Territorial Government of Montana in 1877. The State of Montana purchased the hospital in 1912 and renamed it Warm Springs State Hospital in 1965.

The "warm springs" are located on the hospital campus. Hot water seeps from a limestone cone that is about 40 feet high.

The Native Americans called this the "Lodge of the Whitetailed Deer" giving the Deer Lodge Valley its name. There are no community services other than a bar and convenience store on the frontage road and a post office (zip code 59756) on the hospital campus.
