= Bearmouth, Montana =

- Ghost town
- Location within Montana Location within the United States
- Coordinates: 46°42′37″N 113°19′53″W
- Country: United States
- State: Montana
- County: Granite
- Elevation: 3,802 ft (1,159 m)
- GNIS feature ID: 802017

Bearmouth is a former town located in Granite County, Montana, USA. It began as a trading post for the placer mining camps of Beartown, Garnet and Coloma, located in the hills north of Bearmouth in Granite County. A pioneer family named Lannen operated the gold exchange and ferry boat across the Clark Fork River.

Bearmouth was not a mining camp, but rather a town that depended on the survival of other towns that were mining camps. During the late 19th century, enormously rich ores from Garnet were brought into Bearmouth to be shipped to smelters. When Garnet ceased to exist, Bearmouth followed suit. The town, however, was also a main stop for stagecoaches on the old Mullan Road. As such, it had a two-storied, balconied inn for travelers to spend the night as well as a large livery stable, both of which still stand.

In September 1841, Jesuit priest Pierre Jean De Smet, traveled westward through this area on his way from St. Louis, to establish a mission for the Flathead Indians in the Bitterroot Valley.

The nearest town is Drummond, approximately 8 miles (13 km) to the east. The nearest large city is Missoula, about 40 miles (64 km) to the west. The next large city to the east is Butte, 80 miles (130 km) to the southeast.

The Hazel Marsh Papers is a collection of records from the many Lannen family businesses in Bearmouth. The post office, saloon, and general store ledger books are in the collection as well as financial records and legal documents from Christopher Lannen. School district records and voter registrations from Bearmouth are also in the collection. The collection also contains photographs and memorabilia and is located at the Maureen and Mike Mansfield Library, K. Ross Toole Archives, University of Montana.
