= Reed Point, Montana =

- CDP
- Bank on Main Street as photographed by John Margolies in 2004.

- Location of Reed Point, Montana
- Coordinates: 45°42′26″N 109°32′50″W
- Country: United States
- State: Montana
- County: Stillwater

Area
  - Total: 0.56 sq mi (1.44 km^{2})
  - Land: 0.56 sq mi (1.44 km^{2})
  - Water: 0 sq mi (0.00 km^{2})
- Elevation: 3,767 ft (1,148 m)

Population (2020)
  - Total: 177
  - Density: 318.6/sq mi (123.01/km^{2})
- Time zone: UTC-7 (Mountain (MST))
  - Summer (DST): UTC-6 (MDT)
- ZIP code: 59069
- Area code: 406
- FIPS code: 30-61900
- GNIS feature ID: 2409157

Reed Point is a census-designated place (CDP) in Stillwater County, Montana, United States. The population was 247 at the 2020 census.

== Geography ==
According to the United States Census Bureau, the CDP has a total area of 0.5 square miles (1.3 km^{2}), all land.

=== Climate ===
According to the Köppen Climate Classification system, Reed Point has a semi-arid climate, abbreviated "BSk" on climate maps.

== Demographics ==
Historical population
Census	Pop.	Note	%±
2020	177		—
U.S. Decennial Census

As of the census of 2000, there were 185 people, 79 households, and 50 families residing in the CDP. The population density was 339.6 inhabitants per square mile (131.1/km^{2}). There were 92 housing units at an average density of 168.9 units per square mile (65.2 units/km^{2}). The racial makeup of the CDP was 94.05% White, 1.62% Native American, and 4.32% from two or more races. Hispanic or Latino of any race were 3.78% of the population.

There were 79 households, out of which 31.6% had children under the age of 18 living with them, 51.9% were married couples living together, 7.6% had a female householder with no husband present, and 36.7% were non-families. 35.4% of all households were made up of individuals, and 10.1% had someone living alone who was 65 years of age or older. The average household size was 2.34 and the average family size was 3.06.

In the CDP, the population was spread out, with 27.0% under the age of 18, 8.1% from 18 to 24, 30.3% from 25 to 44, 23.2% from 45 to 64, and 11.4% who were 65 years of age or older. The median age was 39 years. For every 100 females, there were 107.9 males. For every 100 females age 18 and over, there were 110.9 males.

The median income for a household in the CDP was $26,500, and the median income for a family was $33,000. Males had a median income of $21,250 versus $18,000 for females. The per capita income for the CDP was $16,389. About 9.1% of families and 12.0% of the population were below the poverty line, including 16.7% of those under the age of eighteen and 42.9% of those 65 or over.

== Education ==
Reed Point Schools educates students from kindergarten through 12th grade. Reed Point High School's team name is the Renegades.

== History ==
Reed Point was named after Harry Reed who, with his wife, Alice McCleary Reed, ran a stage station for several years.

About 1876, attracted by the reports of the Black Hills stampede, the Reeds went overland with a covered wagon. After a short sojourn around Spearfish, South Dakota, they joined an expedition going to the Big Horn and Yellowstone valley in the summer of 1877. The caravan was attacked by Native Americans while it was still in the Black Hills country, and several of its members were killed.

Their party was later joined by another, led by Dr. W.A. Allen. Their travels across the plains were marked by other encounters with Native Americans and by many hardships. The party reached the Yellowstone River about the time Chief Joseph and the Nez Perce tribe made their raid through this section and fought the Battle of Canyon Creek.

While Harry Reed worked with a timber crew, Alice Reed worked at several ranches and stage stations along the Yellowstone River. About 1878, the Reed's went to Coulson, Montana, where Harry Reed was employed in carrying mail to Fort Custer. He narrowly escaped death by drowning in a freshet of Pryor Creek, but his health was so impaired that he died several months later. The young and widowed Alice Reed made a living by washing clothes until, in April, 1881, she remarried to John Schock, a Civil War veteran who was in charge of the McAdow Ferry at Coulson.

In 1901, the post office was established as Reed, but the name was changed to Reed Point in 1906. Bob Guthrie plotted the townsite in 1911 and a new bridge spanned the Yellowstone River the same year.
