= Racetrack, Montana =

- Census-designated place
- Location within Montana Location within the United States
- Coordinates: 46°16′27″N 112°44′52″W
- Country: United States
- State: Montana
- County: Powell

Area
  - Total: 1.12 sq mi (2.91 km^{2})
  - Land: 1.12 sq mi (2.91 km^{2})
  - Water: 0 sq mi (0.00 km^{2})
- Elevation: 4,685 ft (1,428 m)

Population (2020)
  - Total: 42
  - Density: 37.4/sq mi (14.43/km^{2})
- Time zone: UTC-7 (Mountain (MST))
  - Summer (DST): UTC-6 (MDT)
- ZIP Code: 59722 (Deer Lodge)
- Area code: 406
- FIPS code: 30-60400
- GNIS feature ID: 2806663

Racetrack is a census-designated place (CDP) in Powell County, Montana, United States. As of the 2020 census, Racetrack had a population of 42.

== Geography ==
Racetrack is on the southern edge of Powell County, bordered to the south by Deer Lodge County. Interstate 90 passes through Racetrack, with access from Exit 195. I-90 leads south and east 29 miles (47 km) to Butte and north 8 miles (13 km) to Deer Lodge, the Powell county seat.

The Clark Fork river forms the eastern edge of the Racetrack CDP. Racetrack Creek, rising to the west in the Flint Creek Range, flows through the northern part of the CDP before joining the Clark Fork.

Racetrack was first listed as a CDP prior to the 2020 census.

== Demographics ==
Historical population
| Census | Pop. | Note | %± |
|---|---|---|---|
| 2020 | 42 | | — |
U.S. Decennial Census
