= Gregson, Montana =

Ghost town in Montana, United States

Coordinates: 46°02′53″N 112°48′34″W

Gregson is a ghost town in northwestern Silver Bow and southeastern Deer Lodge counties in Montana, United States.

== History ==
A post office operated in Gregson between 1897 and 1937.
