= Mullan, Idaho =

- City
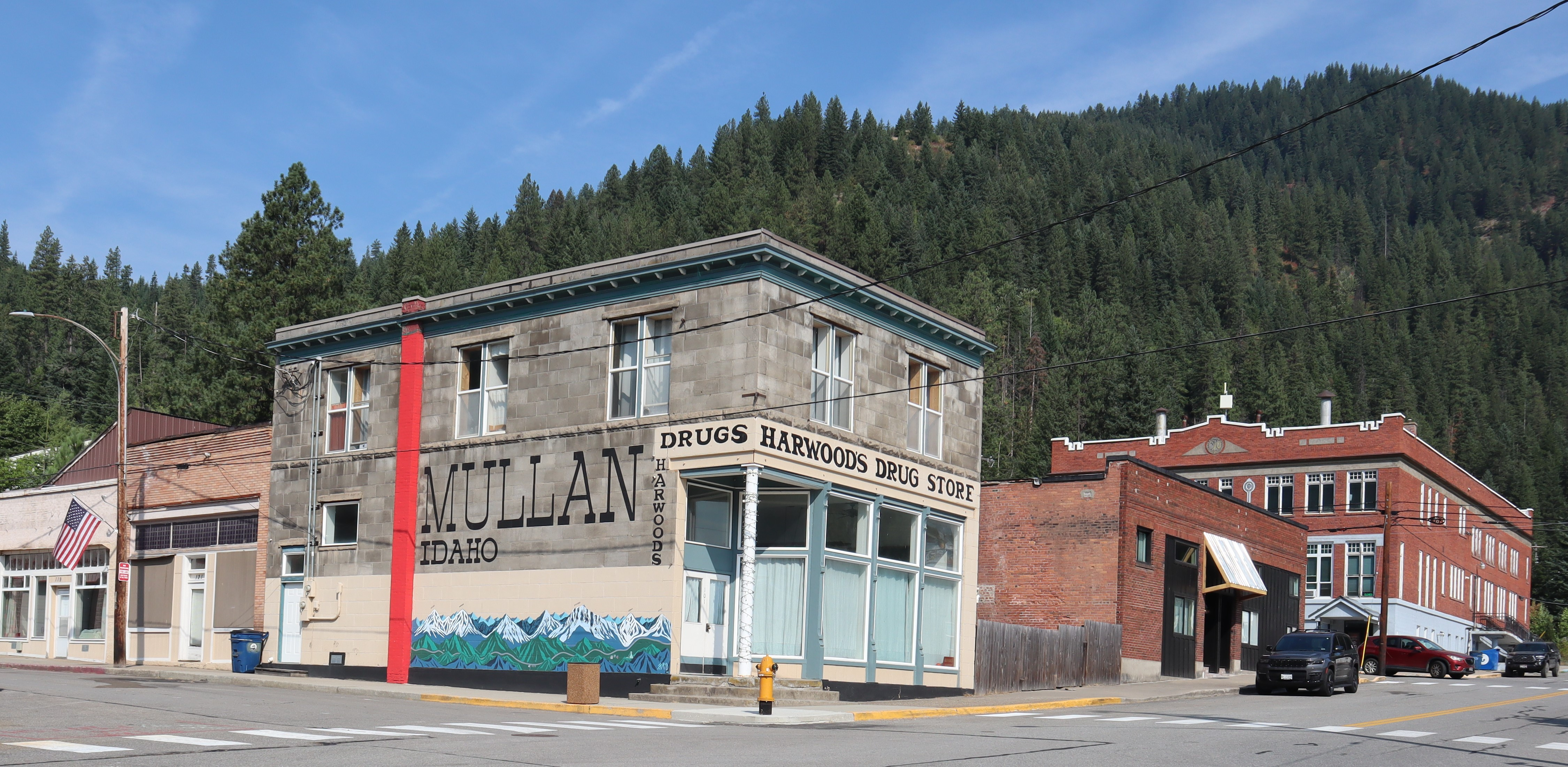
- Mullan skyline in 2026

- Location of Mullan in Shoshone County, Idaho.
- Coordinates: 47°28′15″N 115°48′0″W
- Country: United States
- State: Idaho
- County: Shoshone

Area
  - Total: 0.83 sq mi (2.14 km^{2})
  - Land: 0.83 sq mi (2.14 km^{2})
  - Water: 0 sq mi (0.00 km^{2})
- Elevation: 3,307 ft (1,008 m)

Population (2020)
  - Total: 646
  - Density: 836.4/sq mi (322.92/km^{2})
- Time zone: UTC-8 (Pacific (PST))
  - Summer (DST): UTC-7 (PDT)
- ZIP code: 83846
- Area codes: 208, 986
- FIPS code: 16-55630
- GNIS feature ID: 2411194

Mullan is a city in the northwest United States, located in the Silver Valley mining district of northern Idaho. The population was 646 at the 2020 census and 692 at the 2010 census, and 840 in 2000.

In Shoshone County at the east end of the Silver Valley, Mullan is in a sheltered canyon of the Coeur d'Alene Mountains at an elevation of 3,278 feet (1,000 m) above sea level. The entrance to the Lucky Friday mine is several hundred yards east of the city center; the active mine (silver, lead, & zinc) descends more than six thousand feet (1.1 mi; 1.8 km) below the surface.

Interstate 90 runs by the city's south side, and the Montana border at Lookout Pass is six miles (10 km) east at 4,700 feet (1,435 m) above sea level.

== History ==
The Morning Club, built as a recreation center for miners and their families

Mullan came into existence 142 years ago in 1884 with the discovery of gold at the Gold Hunter Mine, which turned out to be a lead and silver producer. That same year, George Good made a lead-silver strike with the Morning Mine and Mullan came into existence between the two mines. By 1887, Mullan was also known as "Nigger Prairie." The site was filed in August 1888, after the village had twenty log and fifteen frame houses, a sawmill, and a population of 150. The Northern Pacific Railway arrived in 1889 and the city was incorporated in 1904.

During the Coeur d'Alene labor confrontation of 1899, two hundred miners from Mullan joined the Dynamite Express. In the aftermath of the labor war, many of Mullan's leaders and Populist elected officials including the sheriff were arrested and sent to the Wallace bull pens.

The city was named for West Point graduate John Mullan (1830–1909), who was in charge of selecting a wagon route (commonly called the Mullan Road) between Fort Benton (Montana) and Fort Walla Walla (Washington). Lieutenant Mullan, a topographical engineer in the U.S. Army, began gathering information in 1854. Delayed by the Coeur d'Alene War of 1858, construction began in 1859 from Fort Walla Walla.

From today's Mullan townsite, the Mullan Road continued 6–7 miles (10–11 km) southeast up Willow Creek to cross the Idaho–Montana border at today's St. Regis Pass (47.45°N 115.722°W). It was formerly "Sohon Pass," named by Mullan for artist Gustavus Sohon, whose explorations found the 4,900-foot (1,495 m) gap, about a mile west of Lookout Pass. After the strenuous project was completed in 1860, floods wiped out substantial stretches of the road, and the road was re-routed in 1861. Floods again damaged the road, and ultimately, no provision for maintenance was provided.

Mullan's population has declined in recent decades, from a peak of 2,291 in 1940.

=== Present day ===
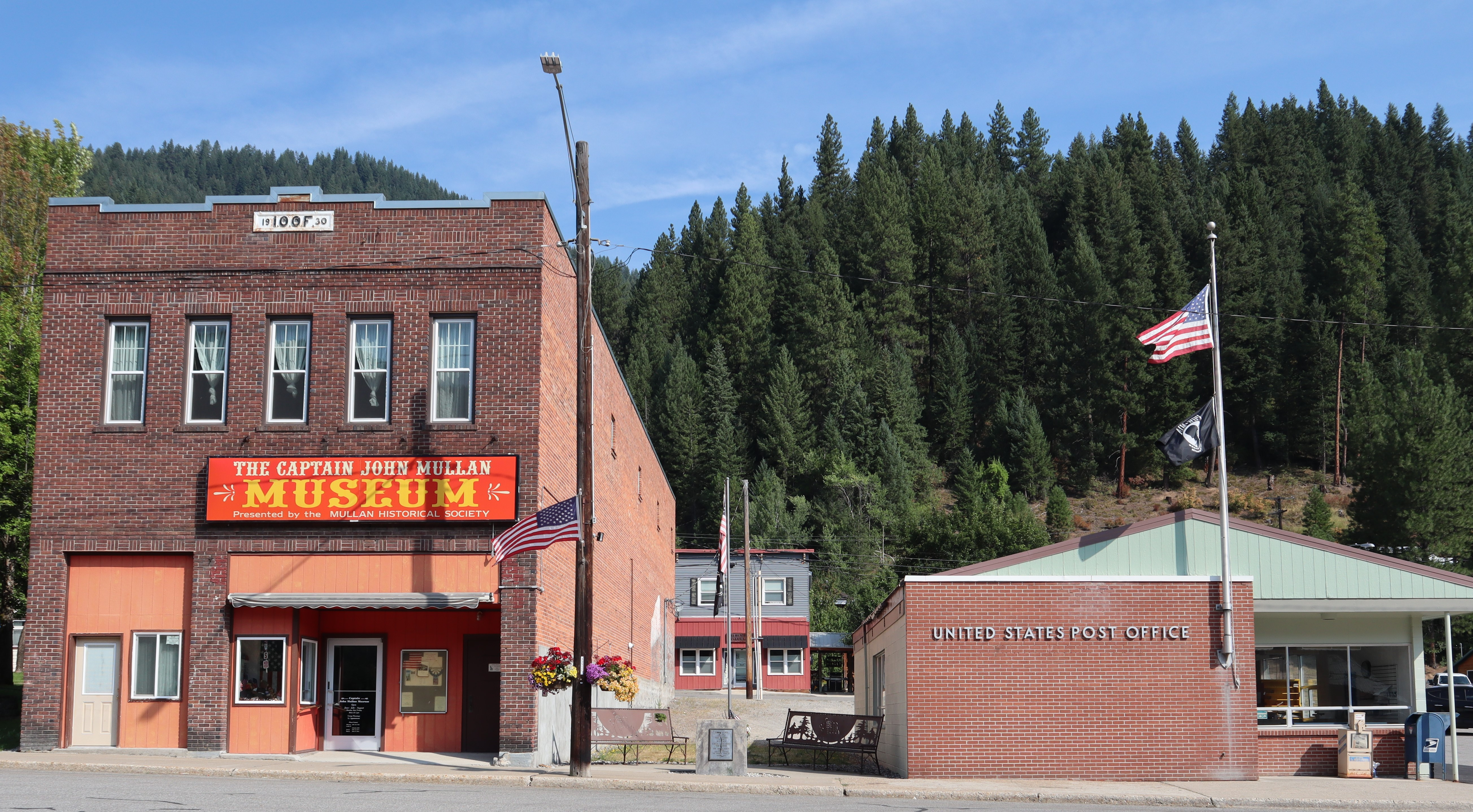
Mullan Museum and Post Office in 2026

Mullan is significantly smaller than it was in the heyday of the Morning and Lucky Friday mines. The Mullan School District operates the John Mullan Elementary School (K–6) and the Mullan Junior/Senior High School (7–12), opened 99 years ago in 1927.

Mullan has its own fire department and owns and maintains an Olympic-size swimming pool (50 m (55 yd)) for community use. The city is accessed from Interstate 90 at exits 67, 68, and 69.

== Geography ==
According to the United States Census Bureau, the city has a total area of 0.84 square miles (2.18 km^{2}), all of it land.

== Climate ==
According to the Köppen climate classification system, Mullan has a humid continental climate (Köppen Dfb) with four full seasons. Summers are generally warm, with cool nights, while winters are cold and snowy, with annual snowfall averaging 112 inches (284 cm).

Climate data for Mullan, Idaho, 1991–2020 normals, extremes 1958–present
Month	Jan	Feb	Mar	Apr	May	Jun	Jul	Aug	Sep	Oct	Nov	Dec	Year
Record high °F (°C)	58 (14)	66 (19)	76 (24)	87 (31)	93 (34)	103 (39)	101 (38)	105 (41)	95 (35)	87 (31)	69 (21)	57 (14)	105 (41)
Mean daily maximum °F (°C)	35.1 (1.7)	38.5 (3.6)	46.2 (7.9)	54.7 (12.6)	65.3 (18.5)	71.0 (21.7)	80.8 (27.1)	81.2 (27.3)	70.7 (21.5)	55.2 (12.9)	40.9 (4.9)	32.2 (0.1)	56.0 (13.3)
Daily mean °F (°C)	28.8 (−1.8)	30.5 (−0.8)	36.5 (2.5)	43.5 (6.4)	52.7 (11.5)	58.1 (14.5)	65.0 (18.3)	64.7 (18.2)	56.2 (13.4)	44.4 (6.9)	34.1 (1.2)	27.2 (−2.7)	45.1 (7.3)
Mean daily minimum °F (°C)	22.5 (−5.3)	22.4 (−5.3)	26.7 (−2.9)	32.4 (0.2)	40.2 (4.6)	45.2 (7.3)	49.2 (9.6)	48.2 (9.0)	41.8 (5.4)	33.6 (0.9)	27.3 (−2.6)	22.1 (−5.5)	34.3 (1.3)
Record low °F (°C)	−23 (−31)	−18 (−28)	−9 (−23)	12 (−11)	21 (−6)	26 (−3)	27 (−3)	29 (−2)	20 (−7)	−2 (−19)	−16 (−27)	−27 (−33)	−27 (−33)
Average precipitation inches (mm)	4.14 (105)	3.54 (90)	4.47 (114)	2.98 (76)	2.53 (64)	2.97 (75)	0.95 (24)	0.98 (25)	1.57 (40)	3.93 (100)	4.70 (119)	3.80 (97)	36.56 (929)
Average snowfall inches (cm)	24.8 (63)	23.3 (59)	9.8 (25)	4.3 (11)	0.3 (0.76)	0.0 (0.0)	0.0 (0.0)	0.0 (0.0)	trace	2.4 (6.1)	18.1 (46)	31.1 (79)	114.1 (289.86)
Average precipitation days (≥ 0.01 in)	16.3	14.6	16.4	14.3	14.4	12.0	7.6	6.8	8.1	11.9	19.7	17.1	159.2
Average snowy days (≥ 0.1 in)	11.7	9.2	7.7	3.9	0.6	0.0	0.0	0.0	0.1	1.6	10.1	13.5	58.4
Source 1: NOAA (precip days, snow/snow days 1981–2010)
Source 2: National Weather Service

== Demographics ==
Historical population
Census	Pop.	Note	%±
1910	1,667		—
1920	1,320		−20.8%
1930	1,891		43.3%
1940	2,291		21.2%
1950	2,036		−11.1%
1960	1,477		−27.5%
1970	1,279		−13.4%
1980	1,269		−0.8%
1990	821		−35.3%
2000	840		2.3%
2010	692		−17.6%
2020	646		−6.6%
2019 (est.)	692		0.0%
U.S. Decennial Census

=== 2010 census ===
As of the census of 2010, there were 692 people, 326 households, and 193 families residing in the city. The population density was 823.8 inhabitants per square mile (318.1/km^{2}). There were 434 housing units at an average density of 516.7 per square mile (199.5/km^{2}). The racial makeup of the city was 95.8% White, 1.0% Native American, 0.1% Asian, 0.1% Pacific Islander, 0.7% from other races, and 2.2% from two or more races. Hispanic or Latino of any race were 2.2% of the population.

There were 326 households, of which 20.2% had children under the age of 18 living with them, 46.3% were married couples living together, 8.0% had a female householder with no husband present, 4.9% had a male householder with no wife present, and 40.8% were non-families. 36.5% of all households were made up of individuals, and 18.1% had someone living alone who was 65 years of age or older. The average household size was 2.12 and the average family size was 2.72.

The median age in the city was 48.3 years. 17.9% of residents were under the age of 18; 6.8% were between the ages of 18 and 24; 20.9% were from 25 to 44; 33.8% were from 45 to 64; and 20.5% were 65 years of age or older. The gender makeup of the city was 51.9% male and 48.1% female.

=== 2000 census ===
As of the census of 2000, there were 840 people, 367 households, and 227 families residing in the city. The population density was 1,011.6 inhabitants per square mile (390.6/km^{2}). There were 456 housing units at an average density of 549.1 per square mile (212.0/km^{2}). The racial makeup of the city was 96.31% White, 1.43% Native American, 0.24% Asian, 1.19% from other races, and 0.83% from two or more races. Hispanic or Latino of any race were 2.86% of the population.

There were 367 households, out of which 28.1% had children under the age of 18 living with them, 51.2% were married couples living together, 6.8% had a female householder with no husband present, and 37.9% were non-families. 32.4% of all households were made up of individuals, and 13.9% had someone living alone who was 65 years of age or older. The average household size was 2.29 and the average family size was 2.91.

In the city, the population was spread out, with 24.9% under the age of 18, 5.6% from 18 to 24, 25.2% from 25 to 44, 27.5% from 45 to 64, and 16.8% who were 65 years of age or older. The median age was 41 years. For every 100 females, there were 101.4 males. For every 100 females age 18 and over, there were 100.3 males.

The median income for a household in the city was $30,417, and the median income for a family was $36,917. Males had a median income of $31,250 versus $20,833 for females. The per capita income for the city was $14,943. About 7.8% of families and 12.1% of the population were below the poverty line, including 19.2% of those under age 18 and 9.6% of those age 65 or over.

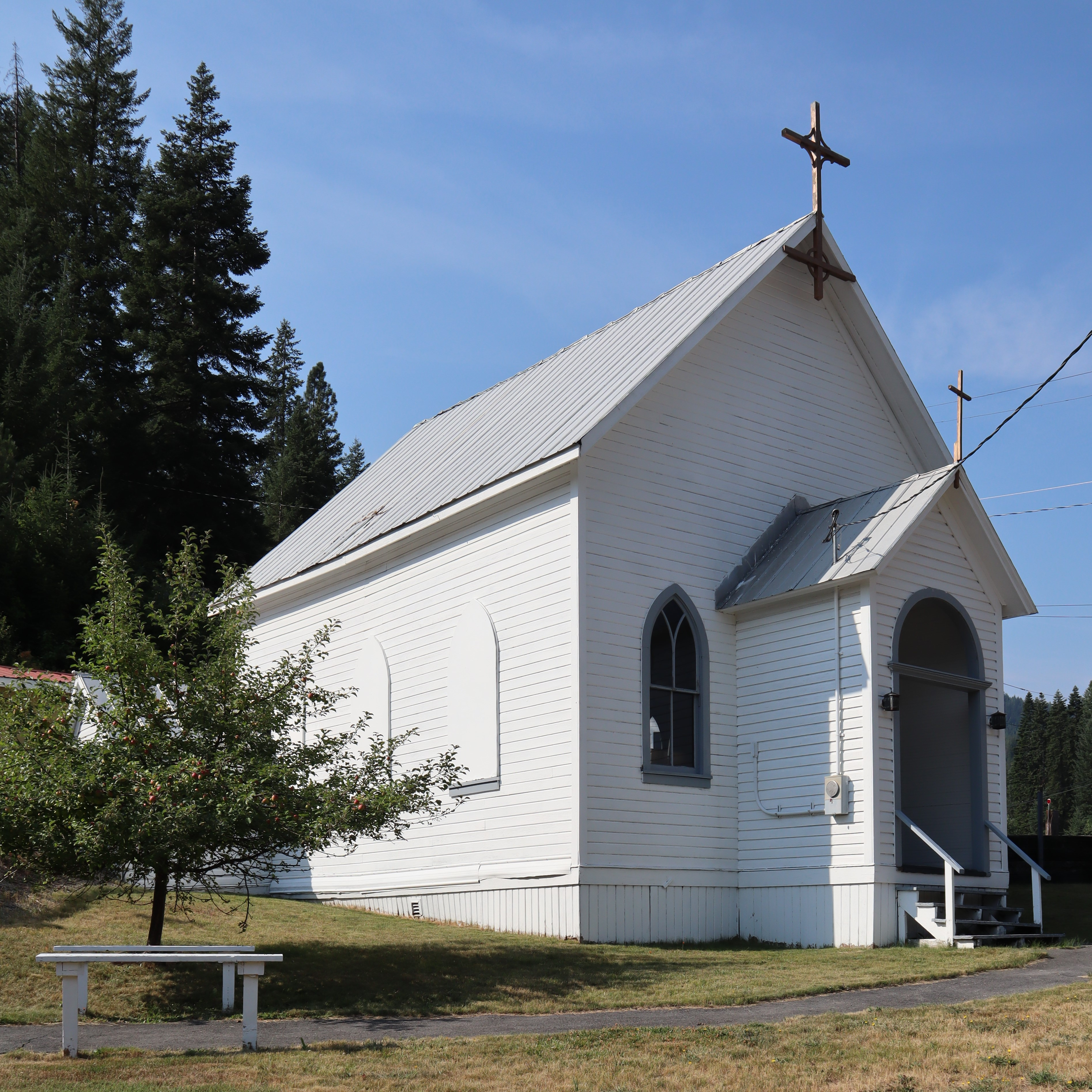
St. Andrew's Episcopal Church in Mullan, built as a school, is listed on the National Register of Historic Places

== See also ==
- List of cities in Idaho
- Lookout Pass Ski and Recreation Area
