= St. Paul Pass Tunnel =

Railway tunnel in Idaho and Montana, United States

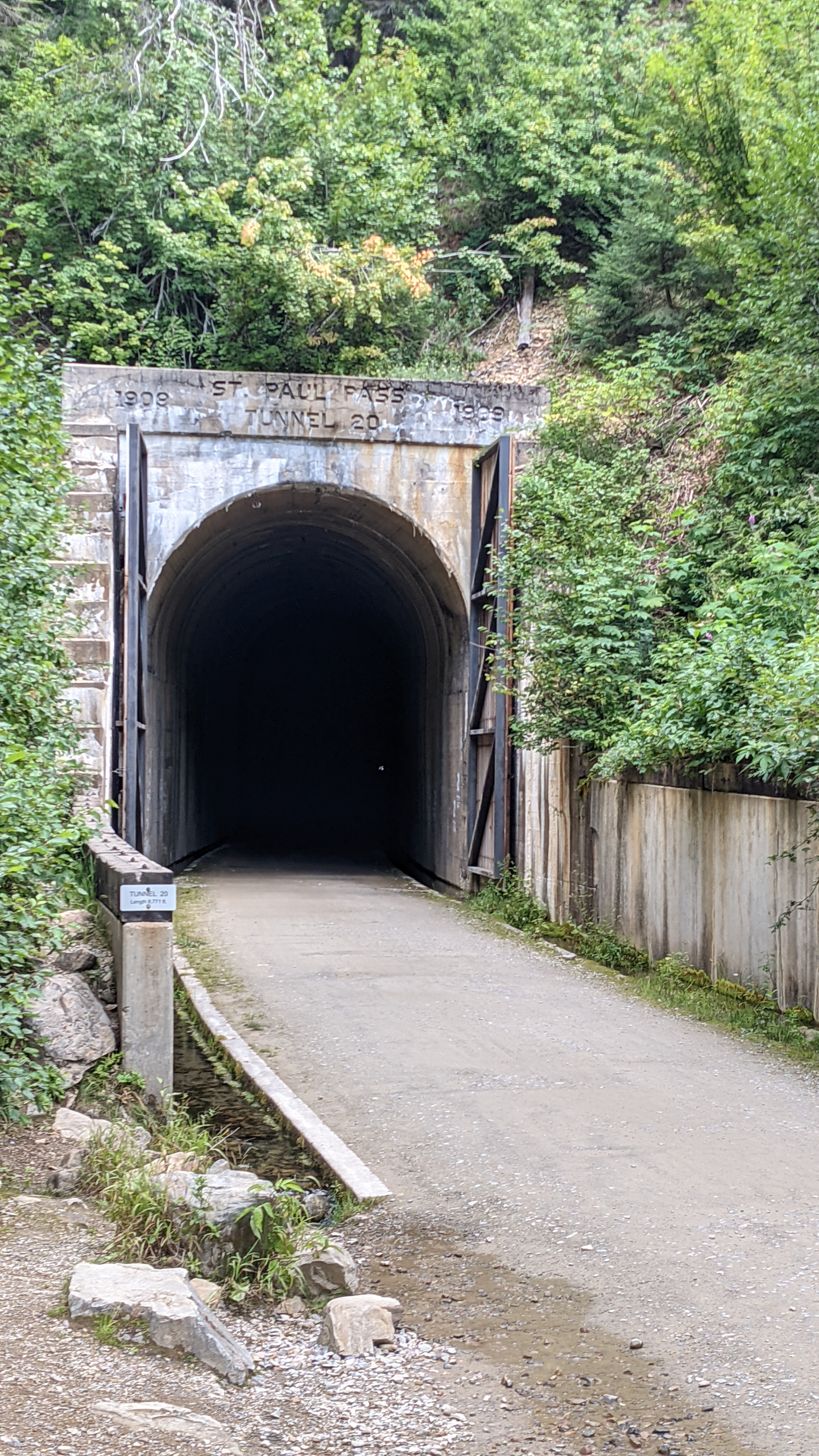
- The Idaho (western) portal of the St Paul Pass Tunnel
- Interactive map of St. Paul Pass Tunnel

Overview
- Official name: Tunnel 20
- Other name: St Paul Pass Tunnel
- Location: Mineral County, Montana, Shoshone County, Idaho, U.S.
- Coordinates: 47°23′20″N 115°38′59″W
- Status: Hiawatha Trail
- System: Milwaukee Road Pacific Extension
- Crosses: Rocky Mountains, Bitterroot Range

Operation
- Work began: 1906 (by the Chicago, Milwaukee & St Paul Railway Co. of Montana)
- Opened: 1908
- Operator: Milwaukee Road
- Character: Rail until 1980, now non-motorized trail

Technical
- Length: 1.661 miles (2.673 km)
- No. of tracks: Single
- Track gauge: Standard
- Electrified: Yes
- Max elevation: 4,150 feet (1,265 m) at East Portal
- Grade: 1.7%

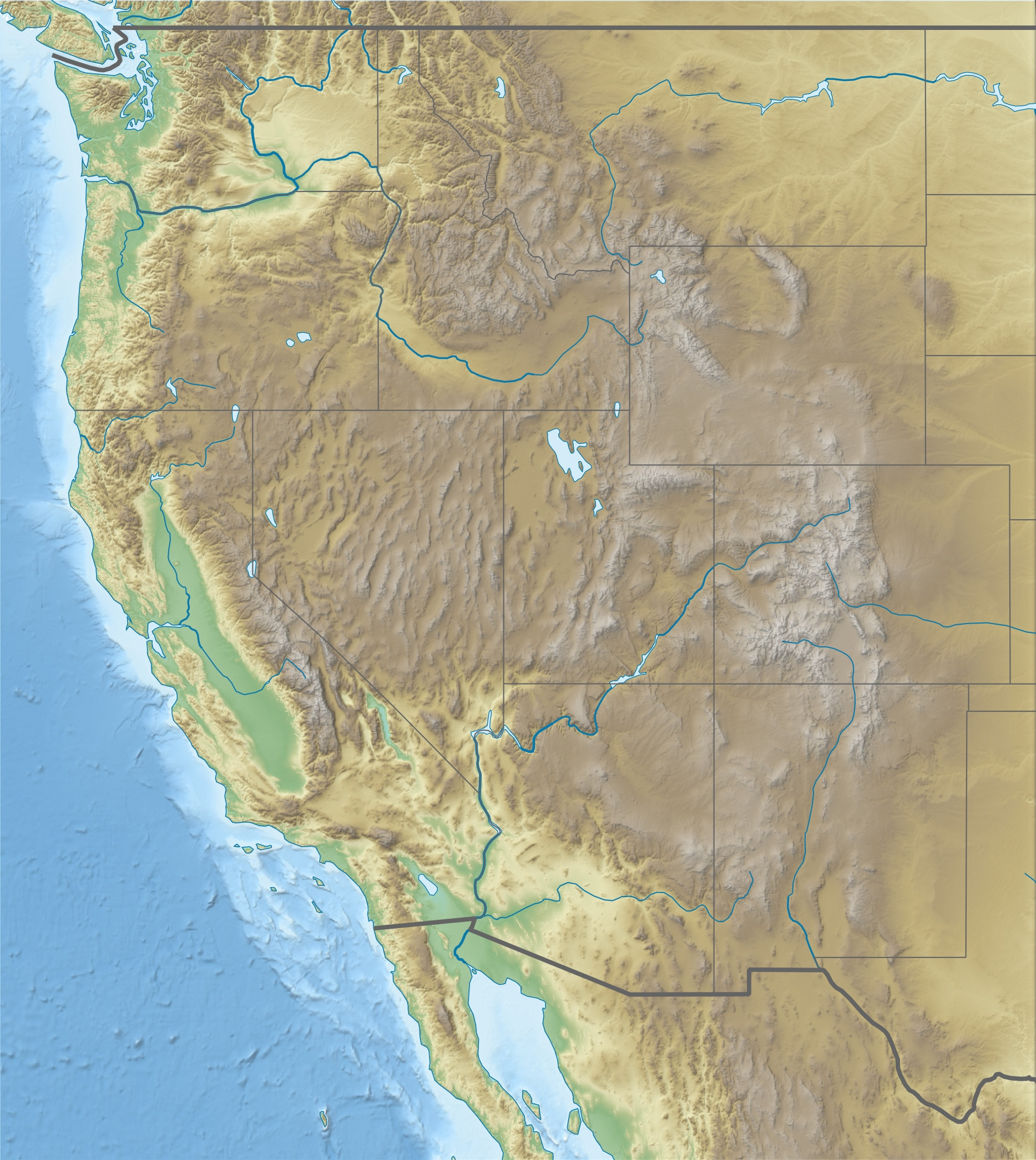
Location in the western United States
Location on Idaho-Montana border

The St. Paul Pass Tunnel was a railway tunnel in the northwest United States at St. Paul Pass, on the Montana–Idaho border. The tunnel was on the main line of the Chicago, Milwaukee, St. Paul & Pacific Railroad, commonly known as "The Milwaukee Road."

The pass is on the Bitterroot Range of northwestern Montana and the Idaho Panhandle. The Milwaukee Road crossed under it in the St. Paul Pass Tunnel, also known as the Taft Tunnel, completed in 1908; its length is 8,771 feet (1.66 mi; 2.67 km) at 4,150 feet (1,265 m) above sea level at East Portal in Montana. The pass above the tunnel is at an elevation of 5,162 feet (1,573 m). The East Portal is two miles (3 km) southwest of exit 5 of Interstate 90.

With ongoing financial problems which worsened in the 1970s, the Milwaukee line abandoned its right-of-way in the West in 1980, but the tunnel and its approach grades have been revived as a rail trail route for hikers and bicyclists, the Route of the Hiawatha Trail.

== Selection of route and construction ==
The tunnel was constructed as part of the Milwaukee Road's "Pacific Coast Extension" project, undertaken in the first decade of the 1900s. It expanded its concentration of railroad lines in the upper Midwest area of Milwaukee-Chicago-Minneapolis-St. Paul across the Rocky Mountains to Washington, ending at the Seattle-Tacoma area on Puget Sound. The construction occurred late in the historical era of American railroading; it was the last transcontinental line built. Surveying began in 1901 and continued until 1909, when a final golden spike was driven in Montana at Garrison.

The St. Paul Pass route was surveyed from Butte starting in August 1906 and continuing through November, using the tools of the era: transit, stadia rod, surveying chain, and barometer. The Milwaukee Road was committed to a route with no more than a 2.2 percent grade, and the surveying west of Butte to the St. Paul Pass was thorough and extensive; it covered some 1,400 miles (2,250 km) in order to select a route of 240 miles (390 km). in spite of this diligent work, the surveyors and engineers only achieved a grade of 1.7% grade from Haugan on the east to Avery on the west in Idaho. This grade was vastly inferior to the Northern Pacific and Great Northern routes from Missoula and Whitefish respectively which had lines to and from Spokane not exceeding 1 percent. Exiting the west portal in Idaho, the route descends through several shorter tunnels, to Avery at just under 2,500 feet (760 m), and on down the St. Joe River another 300 feet (90 m) to St. Maries.

The St. Paul Pass was chosen because of the stands of marketable white pine timber and also because there were no other competing railroads nearby. The contract work for the building of the tunnel was done by Winston Brothers Company of Minneapolis, with the primary subcontract work carried out by contractors W.B. Cronk, A.D. McDougal & Company, Stewart and Welch, and Street & Lusk.

Grading toward the pass began from Missoula in July 1906, and about this same time work began on both approaches to the tunnel, with the approaches being completed in 1906. Heavy boring began in 1907, and the tunnel was officially completed in December 1908. The Milwaukee line recorded the tunnel as "#20" since it numbered its tunnels from east to west. The tunnel's official length was 8,771 feet (1.661 mi; 2.673 km), it was the second-longest on the Milwaukee main line from Chicago to Seattle, behind only the 2¼-mile (3.6 km) Snoqualmie Tunnel in Washington.

== Decline and abandonment ==
Because the Pacific Extension was built without federal land grant assistance that earlier transcontinental railroads had received as an incentive, its construction costs particularly for right of way acquisition, ran significantly over budget. The route by-passed some major population centers and passed through other areas of limited local traffic, which reduced prospective traffic revenues.

Because operation of steam locomotives over the mountain passes was difficult, in 1914 and 1915 the line underwent an electrification process in two sections, one over the Rocky Mountains (1914−1915) and the other over the Cascades (1917) extended to Seattle in 1927, which further deepened cost overruns. The extension became a long haul route. During its history, the Milwaukee offered high speed passenger trains from Chicago and the Twin Cities area to the Tacoma and Seattle area, the well-known Olympian Hiawatha.

Throughout its life, the initial overrun of costs for the Pacific Extension left the Milwaukee Road plagued by financial trouble. The depression and several unsuccessful receiverships followed by the general decline of railroad traffic in the 1950s, followed by the consolidation of larger railroads finally caused the Milwaukee to abandon its entire trackage system in the Idaho-Montana area in 1980.

== Rail trail ==
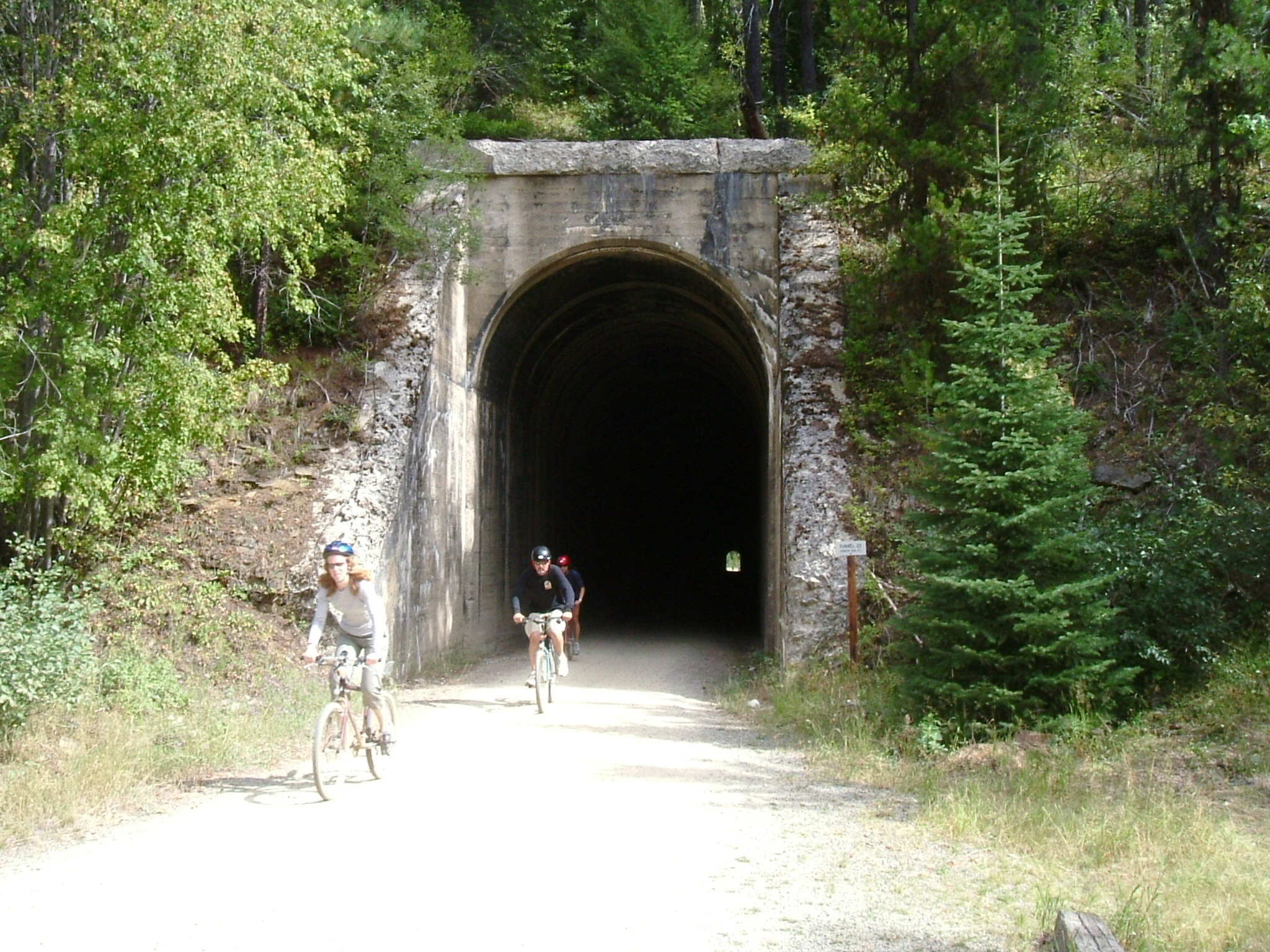
Route of the Hiawatha tunnel

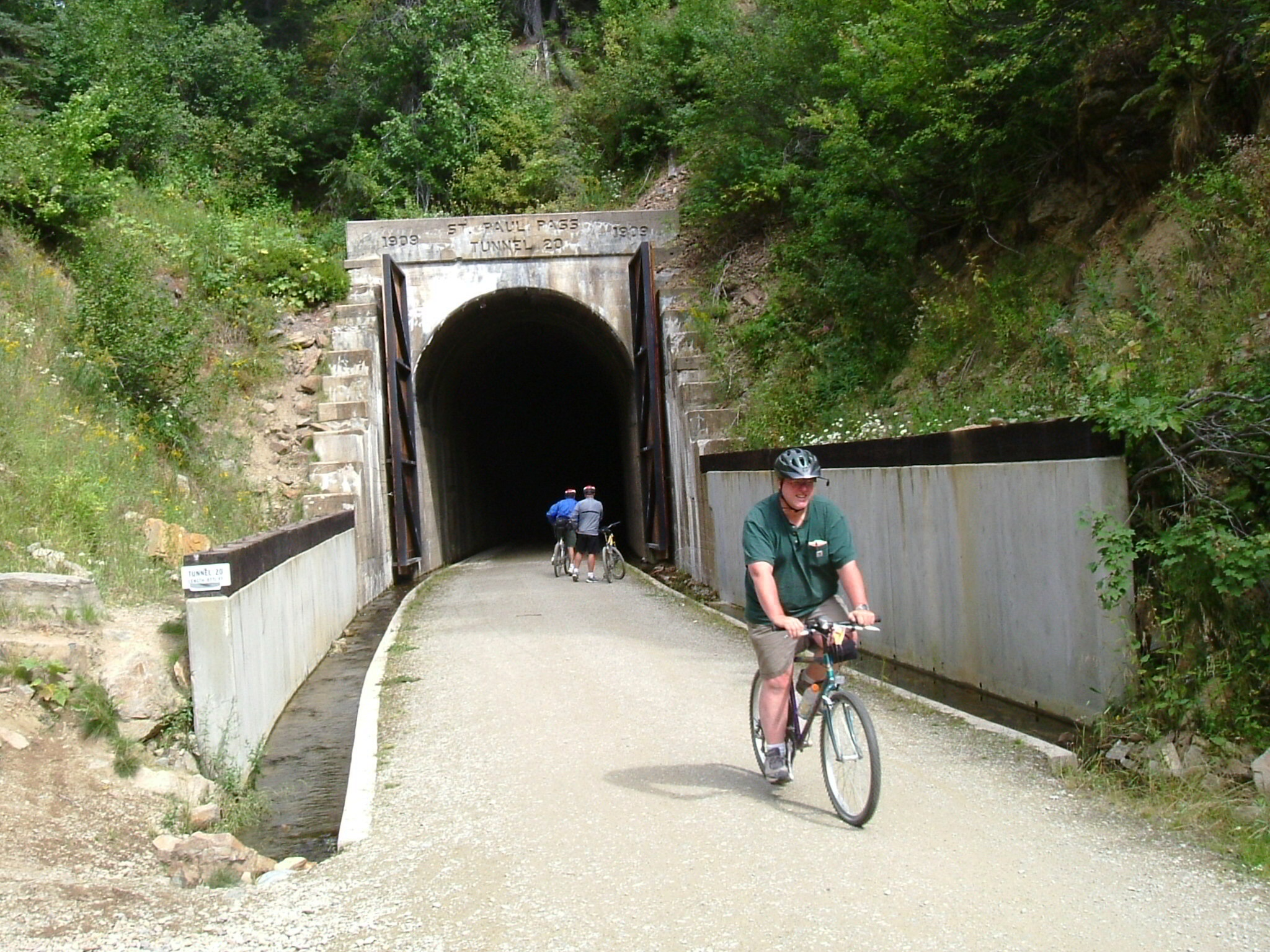
The St Paul Pass Tunnel following conversion into a rail trail

The abandoned tunnel sat dormant and empty for more than twenty years, then it was included in the Chicago, Milwaukee, St. Paul and Pacific Railroad Company Historic District. The St. Paul Tunnel route was officially ‘rededicated’ on June 23, 2001, as part of the Route of the Hiawatha rail trail. Tours are available, or one can simply walk or take a bike through the tunnel from portal to portal, and the tunnel sees thousands of hikers and bikers annually. Along with the St. Paul Tunnel, there are other bridges and tunnels intact on the Idaho approaches to St. Paul Pass, as are part of the "gallows" structures that bore the overhead wires for the electric trains, and some signs and signals along the right of way.

A similar Milwaukee Road rail trail in Washington through the Cascades, Iron Horse State Park, includes the Snoqualmie Tunnel.

== Taft ==
The tunnel under the St. Paul Pass was also known as the Taft Tunnel, after the Montana boom town of Taft, (1907−1910) which sprang up at the east portal of the tunnel during construction. It had a short but colorful history, and was allegedly named after President William Howard Taft, who visited the work camp while Secretary of War under President Theodore Roosevelt; he chastised the town as a "sewer of sin" and "a sore on an otherwise beautiful national forest." Either out of jest or spite, the town named itself after Taft. It was the last of the wide-open towns that followed railroad construction (see Hell on Wheels).

The town sprang up after the end of the "wild west" era, and drew people who were leaving communities which were increasingly turning to law and order; it also attracted those returning from the gold rushes in Alaska, and became a den of criminals and vice. A long distance from the nearest county seat, then at Missoula, and the county sheriff and deputies let Taft develop as it would in anticipation that it would have a short life. It extended along a half-mile (0.8 km) stretch of right-of-way track and peaked at about three thousand denizens. Taft had between twenty and fifty saloons, and the second biggest profession after "railroad worker" was prostitution.

In the spring, the melting banks of snow in the mountain town meant the discovery of dead bodies, and allegedly during the final spring of 1909, as many as seventeen bodies were found. Buildings in Taft had been hastily constructed of wood and were flimsy. After experiencing a few smaller fires, Taft was destroyed by the 1910 "Big Burn" forest fires that extended over much of the Idaho Panhandle and western Montana. As the fire approached Taft, the remaining residents ignored a call to join firefighters, drank up what they could in the saloons and hastily left on an evacuation train. The residents had mostly "squatted" on national forest land, and forest rangers suppressed any effort to rebuild the town. By this time, the railroad construction workers had moved on, and with them the money.

After the fire, the railroad named the same area "East Portal" and it had an electric substation after electrification of the line in about 1914. The few remaining abandoned buildings were buried by the construction of Interstate 90 in 1962, and now nothing remains but its name; exit 5 on I-90 is named "Taft."

== See also ==
- Chicago, Milwaukee, St. Paul and Pacific Railroad
- Chicago, Milwaukee, St. Paul and Pacific Railroad Company Historic District
- Bitterroot Range
- Route of the Hiawatha Trail
- Snoqualmie Tunnel
