= Lookout Pass Ski and Recreation Area =

Ski area in Idaho, United States

Lookout Pass
- Location in Idaho Lookout Pass (the United States)
- Location: Shoshone County, Idaho & Mineral County, Montana; United States
- Nearest city: Mullan: 5 mi (8 km); Coeur d'Alene: 56 mi (90 km); Spokane: 90 mi (145 km); Missoula: 100 mi (160 km)
- Coordinates: 47.453°N 115.707°W
- Vertical: 1,650 ft (500 m)
- Top elevation: 6,150 ft (1,870 m)
- Base elevation: 4,500 ft (1,370 m); Timber Wolf chair 4,720 ft (1,440 m); Main base area
- Skiable area: 1,023 acres (4.1 km^{2})
- Trails: 52: 14% beginner; 42% intermediate; 42% advanced; 2% expert
- Longest run: 2 mi (3.2 km)
- Lift system: 2 fixed grip quad chairs 2 triple chairs 1 double chair
- Terrain parks: 2
- Snowfall: 400 in (1,020 cm)
- Snowmaking: no
- Night skiing: none
- Website: Ski Lookout.com

Lookout Pass Ski and Recreation Area is a ski area in the western United States. It is at Lookout Pass on Interstate 90, on the border of Idaho and Montana, five miles (8 km) east of Mullan, Idaho. It has a summit elevation of 6,150 ft (1,870 m) on Eagle Peak and 5,650 ft (1,720 m) on Runt Mountain with a vertical drop of 1,650 ft (500 m). Lookout Pass operates seven days per week from mid-December until mid-April.

There are two quad chairlifts, two triple chairlifts and one double chairlift at Lookout Pass, with average annual snowfall exceeding 400 inches (1,020 cm). Lookout Pass has two freestyle terrain parks, and a quarter pipe that is 1,111 feet (340 m).

The elevation of the highway pass on I-90 is a moderate 4,720 feet (1,440 m). The historic Mullan Pass, constructed as a wagon road by the U.S. Army in 1860, is about three miles (5 km) east-northeast as the crow flies, at 5,168 feet (1,575 m). Lookout Pass is considered the eastern boundary of Idaho's Silver Valley mining region.

== History ==
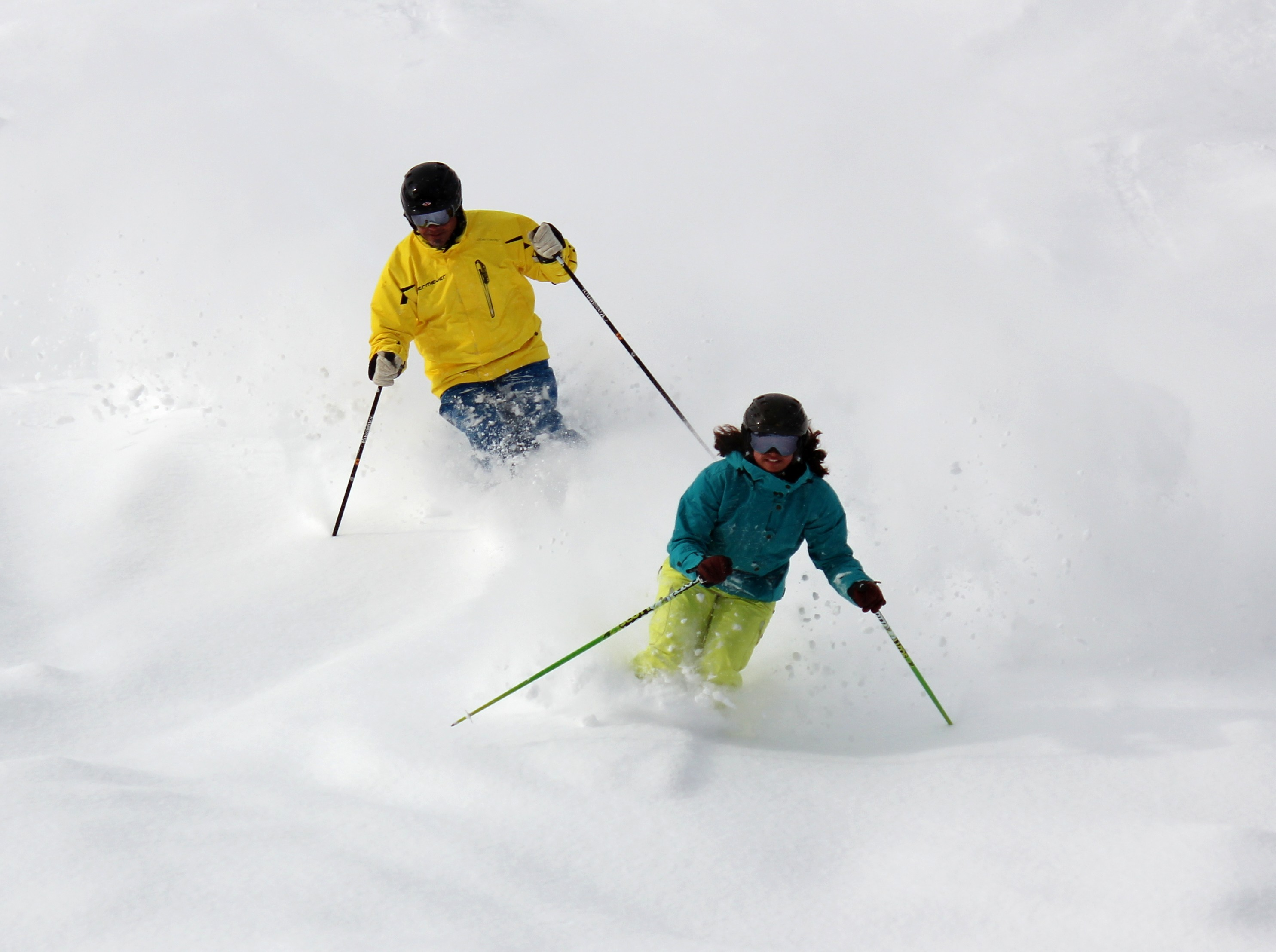
Downhill skiing at Lookout Pass

Opened 91 years ago in 1935, the Lookout Pass ski area operates under a special-use permit of the U.S. Forest Service, in the Idaho Panhandle National Forests (formerly the Coeur d'Alene National Forest). Gradual enhancement of the area has occurred over the decades, and the first chairlift was installed in the summer of 1982.

The community ski hill, run by the nonprofit Idaho Ski Club, was sold in 1992 to Lookout Recreation, Inc., a company formed by two 27-year-old former college roommates, Don Walde of Wallace and Jim Fowler. After seven years, it was sold in 1999 to Lookout Associates, headed by Phil Edholm, and plans for expansion soon followed.

== Expansion ==
A new portion of the ski area opened on December 26, 2003, on the Montana side of the border (which is irregular in this area, following mountains, and is actually due south, see topo map). The new Timber Wolf double chair and five new runs increased the vertical drop (by lowering the base to 4,500 feet (1,370 m)), and the longest new run 1.2 miles (1.9 km) in length. Two of the new runs are rated advanced and three are rated intermediate, with views of the St. Regis and Copper Basins. Additional expansion in 2006 with a chairlift on the Idaho "North Side" opened additional intermediate and expert terrain. In the summer of 2020 the original Chair #1, a 1982 Riblet center-pole double, was replaced by a new Skytrac fixed grip quad. The Eagle Peak expansion added 500 acres with 14 new trails serviced by a new quad chairlift to the West. Eagle Peak chairlift operations began Friday 12/16/2022, followed by an official opening ceremony on 12/17. The previous season Eagle Peak was accessible on a limited basis via snowcat.

== U.S. Ski Team ==
- Beverly Anderson (born 1938) – 1960 Olympian
- Jim Barrier (1940–2000) – 1960 Olympian

== Route of the Hiawatha Trail ==
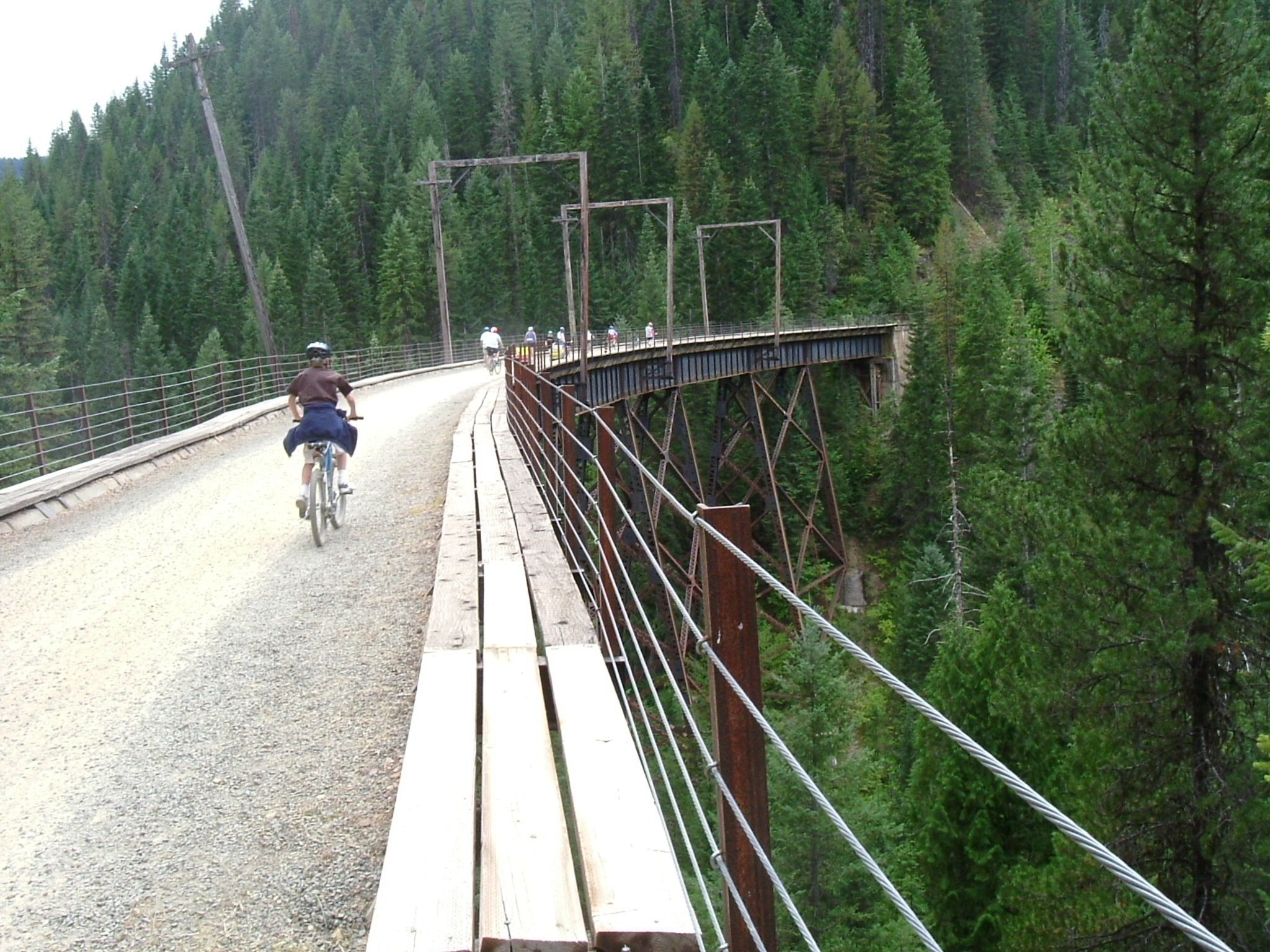
Route of the Hiawatha trestle

Lookout Pass is also a primary staging area for the Route of the Hiawatha Trail, a mountain bike rail trail, which begins in Montana and runs downhill through tunnels and over trestles to the North Fork of the St. Joe River, fifteen miles (25 km) away. It is named for the Olympian Hiawatha passenger trains (1947–1961) of the Chicago, Milwaukee, St. Paul and Pacific Railroad ("Milwaukee Road"), on whose abandoned rights of way, trestles, and tunnels the gravel trail rests.

The Route of the Hiawatha Trail stretches from St. Regis, Montana, to Pearson, Idaho, (elevation 3,150 feet (960 m)), several miles north of Avery, (equidistantly south of Mullan). The trail includes the tunnel at St. Paul Pass, which is 1.66 miles (2.7 km) in length at an elevation of 4,150 feet (1,260 m).

Bus service is available to take bicycle riders back to the start of the trail. A fee is charged for riding the trail, and during the winter months the trail is closed. Parking and unimproved camping spots are available at the trail's start, as well as at the end of the trail. Several other trails are nearby for further exploration; one of these follows the old road along the North Fork of the St. Joe River to Avery and has an improved campground at its start.

Another nearby rail trail is the Trail of the Coeur d'Alenes; from Mullan it travels over seventy miles (110 km) westbound, descending the Coeur d'Alene River through Silver Valley and crossing Lake Coeur d'Alene. It follows the former right-of-way of the Union Pacific Railroad.

== See also ==
- Taft, Montana
