= Opportunity, Montana =

Unincorporated community in Montana, United States

- Unincorporated community
- Location within Montana Location within the United States
- Coordinates: 46°06′26″N 112°49′41″W
- Country: United States
- State: Montana
- County: Deer Lodge
- Elevation: 4,974 ft (1,516 m)
- Time zone: UTC-7 (Mountain (MST))
  - Summer (DST): UTC-6 (MDT)
- Area code: 406
- GNIS feature ID: 788474

Opportunity is an unincorporated community in Deer Lodge County, Montana, United States. It is located on Pintler Veterans Memorial Scenic Highway, six miles from Anaconda. It is near the Anaconda Smelter Stack.
