= Fairmont Hot Springs Resort =

Resort in Silver Bow County, Montana

Coordinates: 46°02′35″N 112°48′36″W

Fairmont Hot Springs Resort (previously known as Gregson Hot Springs) is a resort in Silver Bow County, Montana, United States.

== Description ==
In addition the hot springs (with waterslide and four naturally heated pools, both indoor and outdoor), the resort includes an 18-hole golf course, and 153 guest rooms, as well as a spa and restaurant. It is located at 1500 Fairmont Road in Fairmont.

== History ==
The resort was originally named after the Gregson brothers that purchased the area in 1869, but was given its current name after being acquired in the early 1970s by Lloyd Wilder. Wilder sold the resort in 1981, but later repurchased it.

In early 2020, the resort was severely affected by the COVID-19 pandemic. Due state mandated restrictions regarding the resort facilities, 148 employees were temporarily laid off.

== Water mineral content ==
The mineral content of the water includes cesium, hydrogen sulfide, aluminum, rubidium, ammonia, manganese and zinc.
