= Montana Western Railway (1986–2003) =

American former railroad

The Montana Western Railway (reporting mark MWRR) was an American railroad. In 1986, the MWRR leased and began operating trackage owned by the Burlington Northern Railroad between the towns of Butte and Garrison, Montana, a distance of 52 miles (84 km). In 2003, the line was returned to the BNSF Railway, corporate successor to the Burlington Northern, and it is now operated by BNSF.
