= Galen, Montana =

Unincorporated community in Montana, United States

- Unincorporated community
- Galen water tower

- Location within Montana Location within the United States
- Coordinates: 46°14′08″N 112°46′34″W
- Country: United States
- State: Montana
- County: Deer Lodge
- Elevation: 4,761 ft (1,451 m)
- Time zone: UTC-7 (Mountain (MST))
  - Summer (DST): UTC-6 (MDT)
- Area code: Area code
- GNIS feature ID: 783797

Galen is an unincorporated community in Deer Lodge County, Montana, United States. It is located near the Montana State Prison and in this community is a handful of residential housing facilities and apartments.
