= Coeur d'Alene Mountains =

Northernmost portion of the Bitterroot mountain range in the northeast United States

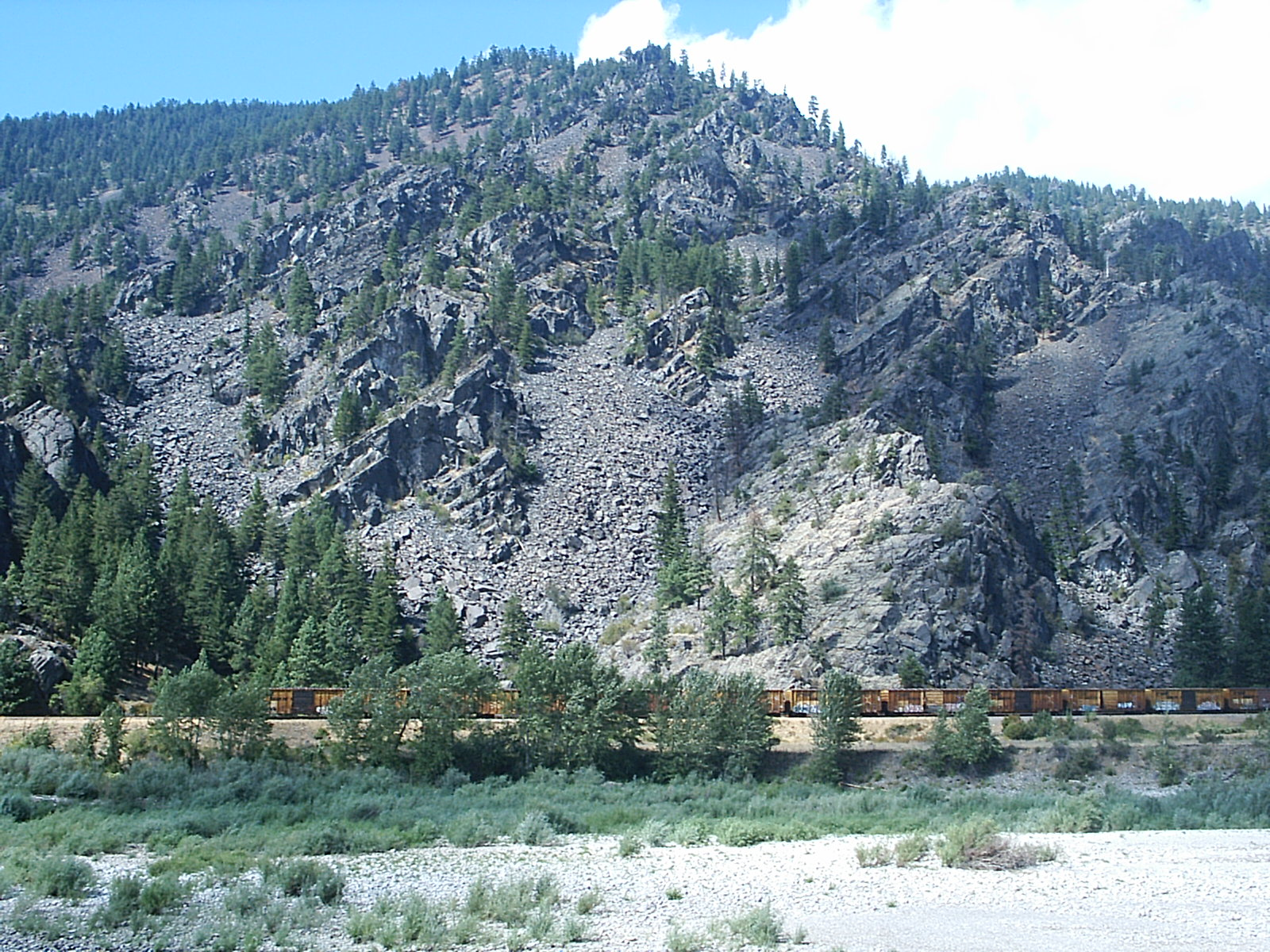

Highest point
- Peak: Cherry Peak
- Elevation: 7,352 ft (2,241 m)
- Coordinates: 47°29′16.49″N 115°10′11.99″W

Dimensions
- Length: 98 mi (158 km) E/W
- Width: 62 mi (100 km) N/S
- Area: 2,590 mi^{2} (6,700 km^{2})

Geography
- Country: United States
- States: Idaho; Montana
- Parent range: Bitterroot Range

The Coeur d'Alene Mountains are the northwesternmost portion of the Bitterroot Range, part of the Rocky Mountains, located in northern Idaho and westernmost Montana in the Western United States.

The mountain range spans an area of 2,590 square miles (6,708 km^{2}) and its two highest peaks are the 7,352-foot (2,241 m) Cherry Peak and the 6,837-foot (2,084 m) Patricks Knob.

The range is named after the Coeur d'Alene Tribe.

Several decent-sized roadless areas exist in the Montana portion of the Coeur d'Alenes. Around 43,000 acres (17,000 ha) of roadless country centered on 5,980-foot (1,823 m) Mount Bushnell, south of Thompson Falls, provides good habitat for deer, elk, and mountain lion. This area is/was densely forested with lodgepole pine generated from the Great Fire of 1910. Thirty miles (48 km) of trails provide good hiking opportunities in this roadless area. Talus slopes, grassy parks in the highest reaches, and boggy creek bottoms characterize the landscape here in addition to the forests. Lush riparian areas are home to the Coeur d'Alene salamander and tailed frog.

Just east of the Mount Bushnell area are approximately 40,000 acres (16,000 ha) of roadless land centered on Cherry Peak, highest in the Coeur d'Alenes. Vertical relief exceeds 4,500 feet (1,372 m) in less than two miles (3.2 km) from the Clark Fork River to this area's highest peaks. Several tiny alpine lakes are hidden in cirque basins on Eddy Mountain. Subalpine fir and devil's club are commonly found.

Another 18,000 acres (7,300 ha) are roadless around Patrick's Knob. This area contains thick forests of Douglas-fir and larch in the west and scattered trees in the east; a large and commonly seen herd of bighorn sheep winters here. An old bootlegger's cabin is located on Fourteen Mile Creek.

== See also ==
- List of mountain ranges in Montana
