= National Register of Historic Places listings in Granite County, Montana =

Location of Granite County in Montana

This is a list of the National Register of Historic Places listings in Granite County, Montana. It is intended to be a complete list of the properties and districts on the National Register of Historic Places in Granite County, Montana, United States. The locations of National Register properties and districts for which the latitude and longitude coordinates are included below, may be seen in a map.

There are 12 properties and districts listed on the National Register in the county.

This National Park Service list is complete through NPS recent listings posted August 29, 2025.

== Current listings ==
	Name on the Register	Image	Date listed	Location	City or town	Description
1	Anderson Lumber Company		December 3, 1986 (#86002790)	Roughly bounded by Brown, 1st, and Holland Sts. 46°20′02″N 113°18′01″W	Philipsburg	
2	M.E. Doe House	M.E. Doe House	December 3, 1986 (#86002788)	Dearborn and Montgomery Sts. 46°19′44″N 113°17′34″W	Philipsburg	
3	Garnet Historic District	Garnet Historic District	August 12, 2010 (#10000547)	11 miles north of the junction of Interstate 90 and Bear Gulch Rd. in the Bureau of Land Management's Garnet Resource Area; 46°49′31″N 113°20′20″W	Garnet	
4	Granite County Jail	Granite County Jail	August 27, 1980 (#80002420)	Kearney St. 46°20′02″N 113°17′31″W	Philipsburg	
5	Miners Union Hall	Miners Union Hall	December 19, 1974 (#74001096)	East of Philipsburg in Deerlodge National Forest; 46°19′04″N 113°14′55″W	Philipsburg vicinity	
6	Moose Lake Camp Historic District		December 26, 2017 (#100001931)	Moose Lake Residential Site, Lots 4 & 5, Block B 46°03′09″N 113°31′44″W	Philipsburg vicinity	
7	Morgan-Case Homestead		February 9, 2005 (#05000011)	Dirt road south of the confluence of Hogback Creek and Rock Creek; 46°26′48″N 113°41′35″W	Philipsburg vicinity	
8	Philipsburg Grade School	Philipsburg Grade School	December 3, 1986 (#86002789)	West of Schnepel St. 46°19′44″N 113°17′43″W	Philipsburg	
9	Philipsburg Historic District	Philipsburg Historic District	September 30, 1986 (#86002791)	Roughly bounded by Gamma St. and Cleveland Ave., Montgomery, Madison, and Duffy, and Cedar and McDonald Sts. 46°20′03″N 113°17′38″W	Philipsburg	
10	Ringeling House		December 3, 1986 (#86002787)	Caledonian Mining Claim, east of the Doe and Morse Addition; 46°19′40″N 113°17′21″W	Philipsburg	
11	Rock Creek Guard Station (24GN165)		July 13, 1982 (#82003172)	West of Philipsburg on Montana Secondary Highway 348 and the Rock Creek Rd. 46°25′20″N 113°42′56″W	Philipsburg vicinity	
12	Superintendent's House		December 17, 1974 (#74001097)	East of Philipsburg in Deerlodge National Forest; 46°19′01″N 113°14′45″W	Philipsburg vicinity	

== See also ==
- List of National Historic Landmarks in Montana
- National Register of Historic Places listings in Montana
