= Stone, Montana =

Stone
- Unincorporated Community
- Interactive map of Stone
- Coordinates: 46°30′19″N 113°13′24″W
- Country: United States
- State: Montana
- County: Granite
- Elevation: 4,528 ft (1,380 m)
- GNIS feature ID: 791540

Stone is an unincorporated community in Granite County, Montana, United States, located 11.9 miles south of Drummond and 12.43 mi north of Phillipsburg on the Pintler Veterans Memorial Scenic Highway. Stone is served by the post office in Hall.
