= Sherryl, Montana =

Sherryl
- Unincorporated Community
- Interactive map of Sherryl
- Coordinates: 46°33′10″N 113°13′05″W
- Country: United States
- State: Montana
- County: Granite
- Elevation: 4,311 ft (1,314 m)
- GNIS feature ID: 806805

Sherryl is an unincorporated community in Granite County, Montana, United States, located 8.7 miles south of Drummond on the Pintler Veterans Memorial Scenic Highway.

The community is served by the post office in Hall.
