= Princeton, Montana =

Princeton
- Unincorporated Community
- Interactive map of Princeton
- Coordinates: 46°25′01″N 113°09′56″W
- Country: United States
- State: Montana
- County: Granite
- Elevation: 5,384 ft (1,641 m)
- GNIS feature ID: 789189

Princeton is an unincorporated community in Granite County, Montana, United States. It is located 8.5 miles (13.7 km) north-east of Phillipsburg and 17.5 miles (28.2 km) south of Drummond.
