= List of mountain passes in Montana (M–Z) =

There are at least 290 named mountain passes in Montana, including:

- MacDonald Pass, Lewis and Clark County, Montana, 46°33′41″N 112°18′31″W, el. 6,312 feet (1,924 m)
- Marias Pass, Glacier County, Montana, 48°19′00″N 113°21′17″W, el. 5,236 feet (1,596 m)
- Markle Pass, Sanders County, Montana, 47°33′01″N 114°37′12″W, el. 3,323 feet (1,013 m)
- McCormack Pass, Madison County, Montana, 45°31′55″N 111°27′50″W, el. 5,817 feet (1,773 m)
- Meyers Creek Pass, Sweet Grass County, Montana, 45°29′01″N 109°59′54″W, el. 8,104 feet (2,470 m)
- Mill Creek Pass, Park County, Montana, 45°22′07″N 110°25′30″W, el. 9,419 feet (2,871 m)
- Miller Saddle, Mineral County, Montana, 47°04′36″N 115°05′00″W, el. 5,610 feet (1,710 m)
- Milwaukee Pass, Sanders County, Montana, 48°04′24″N 115°41′01″W, el. 6,696 feet (2,041 m)
- Mink Creek Saddle, Ravalli County, Montana, 45°50′29″N 113°51′12″W, el. 6,703 feet (2,043 m)
- Minton Creek Pass, Sanders County, Montana, 47°49′30″N 115°43′03″W, el. 3,753 feet (1,144 m)
- Missouri Cutoff, Carbon County, Montana, 45°18′01″N 109°17′31″W, el. 5,033 feet (1,534 m)
- Mollman Pass, Lake County, Montana, (Salish: sɫipú sx̣ʷcusi, múlmin sx̣ʷcusi) 47°28′46″N 113°56′48″W, el. 6,916 feet (2,108 m)
- Monida Pass, Beaverhead County, Montana, 44°33′31″N 112°18′23″W, el. 6,818 feet (2,078 m)
- Moose Pass, Meagher County, Montana, 46°47′36″N 110°56′31″W, el. 6,066 feet (1,849 m)
- Morrisy Coulee Narrows, Wheatland County, Montana, 46°38′22″N 110°13′55″W, el. 6,161 feet (1,878 m)
- Mud Creek Saddle, Ravalli County, Montana, 45°44′48″N 114°19′43″W, el. 5,820 feet (1,770 m)
- Muggins Gap, Rosebud County, Montana, 46°31′30″N 107°40′06″W, el. 3,451 feet (1,052 m)
- Mullan Pass, Mineral County, Montana, 47°27′46″N 115°38′21″W, el. 5,223 feet (1,592 m)
- Mullan Pass, Powell County, Montana, 46°38′40″N 112°18′53″W, el. 5,932 feet (1,808 m)
- Muskrat Pass, Flathead County, Montana, 48°08′40″N 113°04′32″W, el. 5,984 feet (1,824 m)
- Mustard Pass, Madison County, Montana, 45°33′21″N 112°03′54″W, el. 9,675 feet (2,949 m)
- Nevada Narrows, Meagher County, Montana, 46°37′59″N 110°16′48″W, el. 6,027 feet (1,837 m)
- Nez Perce Pass, Ravalli County, Montana, 45°42′59″N 114°30′07″W, el. 6,571 feet (2,003 m)
- Nezperce Pass, Ravalli County, Montana, 45°43′13″N 114°29′46″W, el. 6,325 feet (1,928 m)
- Observation Pass, Lewis and Clark County, Montana, 47°23′20″N 112°55′34″W, el. 7,454 feet (2,272 m)
- Packbox Pass, Ravalli County, Montana, 46°28′04″N 114°23′11″W, el. 7,132 feet (2,174 m)
- Pass of the Winds, Missoula County, Montana, 47°17′55″N 113°52′25″W, el. 8,163 feet (2,488 m)
- Pete Creek Divide, Beaverhead County, Montana, 44°32′02″N 112°04′44″W, el. 7,657 feet (2,334 m)
- Piegan Pass, Glacier County, Montana, 48°43′11″N 113°41′19″W, el. 7,664 feet (2,336 m)
- Pintler Pass, Deer Lodge County, Montana, 45°56′32″N 113°29′07″W, el. 8,737 feet (2,663 m)
- Piper-Crow Pass, Lake County, Montana, 47°36′08″N 113°56′57″W, el. 6,857 feet (2,090 m)
- Pipestone Pass (Montana), Silver Bow County, Montana, 45°51′24″N 112°26′22″W, el. 6,476 feet (1,974 m)
- Pitamakan Pass, Glacier County, Montana, 48°31′04″N 113°27′31″W, el. 7,543 feet (2,299 m)
- Porcupine Pass, Sanders County, Montana, 47°50′50″N 115°53′24″W, el. 5,043 feet (1,537 m)
- Porcupine Saddle, Ravalli County, Montana, 45°44′36″N 113°59′29″W, el. 7,159 feet (2,182 m)
- Price-Peet Divide, Beaverhead County, Montana, 44°32′57″N 112°05′27″W, el. 7,684 feet (2,342 m)
- Priest Pass, Lewis and Clark County, Montana, 46°37′10″N 112°17′55″W, el. 6,004 feet (1,830 m)
- Pryor Gap, Big Horn County, Montana, 45°17′33″N 108°36′08″W, el. 4,915 feet (1,498 m)
- Pyramid Pass, Powell County, Montana, 47°15′50″N 113°22′35″W, el. 6,998 feet (2,133 m)
- Racetrack Pass, Granite County, Montana, 46°21′05″N 113°02′37″W, el. 8,527 feet (2,599 m)
- Radersburg Pass, Jefferson County, Montana, 46°15′33″N 111°54′25″W, el. 7,506 feet (2,288 m)
- Rainbow Lake Pass, Sanders County, Montana, 47°31′21″N 114°46′44″W, el. 3,599 feet (1,097 m)
- Ralston Gap, Teton County, Montana, 47°54′21″N 112°18′23″W, el. 4,081 feet (1,244 m)
- Raynolds Pass, Madison County, Montana, 44°42′40″N 111°28′11″W, el. 6,831 feet (2,082 m)
- Red Eagle Pass, Flathead County, Montana 48°34′36″N 113°35′39″W, el. 6,634 feet (2,022 m)
- Red Rock Pass, Beaverhead County, Montana, 44°35′56″N 111°31′25″W, el. 7,152 feet (2,180 m)
- Redgap Pass, Glacier County, Montana, 48°51′46″N 113°41′20″W, el. 7,539 feet (2,298 m)
- Rocky Gap, Cascade County, Montana, 47°20′59″N 111°45′35″W, el. 3,445 feet (1,050 m)
- Rogers Pass, Lewis and Clark County, Montana, 47°04′35″N 112°22′14″W, el. 5,630 feet (1,720 m)
- Rooster Comb, Granite County, Montana, 46°02′32″N 113°48′08″W, el. 8,386 feet (2,556 m)
- Ross Pass, Fergus County, Montana, 47°13′29″N 109°05′55″W, el. 4,800 feet (1,500 m)
- Ross Pass, Gallatin County, Montana, 45°51′03″N 110°57′04″W, el. 7,592 feet (2,314 m)
- Route Creek Pass, Teton County, Montana, 47°52′24″N 112°49′56″W, el. 7,270 feet (2,220 m)
- S and G Saddle, Missoula County, Montana, 46°40′53″N 113°47′25″W, el. 5,669 feet (1,728 m)
- Saint Paul Pass, Sanders County, Montana, 48°04′36″N 115°38′52″W, el. 6,063 feet (1,848 m)
- Saint Paul Pass, Mineral County, Montana, 47°23′25″N 115°38′58″W, el. 5,171 feet (1,576 m)
- Sawmill Saddle, Granite County, Montana, 46°26′59″N 113°50′58″W, el. 6,604 feet (2,013 m)
- Schley Saddle, Mineral County, Montana, 46°48′55″N 114°46′09″W, el. 6,788 feet (2,069 m)
- Schultz Saddle, Beaverhead County, Montana, 45°46′51″N 113°47′15″W, el. 7,930 feet (2,420 m)
- Seemo Pass, Flathead County, Montana, 48°52′55″N 114°38′14″W, el. 6,650 feet (2,030 m)
- Shetland Divide, Phillips County, Montana, 47°50′05″N 108°48′17″W, el. 3,241 feet (988 m)
- Shoemaker Gap, Phillips County, Montana, 47°46′37″N 107°32′49″W, el. 2,877 feet (877 m)
- Siegel Pass, Missoula County, Montana, 47°15′34″N 114°42′16″W, el. 5,102 feet (1,555 m)
- Silver Butte Pass, Lincoln County, Montana, 47°55′05″N 115°28′52″W, el. 4,272 feet (1,302 m)
- Silver Pass, Park County, Montana, 45°20′32″N 110°21′29″W, el. 9,452 feet (2,881 m)
- Sioux Pass, Big Horn County, Montana, 45°14′52″N 107°08′36″W, el. 4,810 feet (1,470 m)
- Siyeh Pass, Glacier County, Montana, 48°43′14″N 113°37′47″W, el. 7,766 feet (2,367 m)
- Skalkaho Pass, Ravalli County, Montana, 46°14′45″N 113°46′24″W, el. 7,257 feet (2,212 m)
- Smith Creek Pass, Missoula County, Montana, 47°35′03″N 113°37′27″W, el. 7,926 feet (2,416 m)
- Snake Creek Pass, Sanders County, Montana, 48°09′14″N 115°45′52″W, el. 3,645 feet (1,111 m)
- Snowshoe Pass, Madison County, Montana, 44°44′12″N 111°42′39″W, el. 7,549 feet (2,301 m)
- Snuff Gap, McCone County, Montana, 47°50′14″N 106°09′21″W, el. 2,510 feet (770 m)
- Spotted Bear Pass, Lewis and Clark County, Montana, 47°44′31″N 113°07′13″W, el. 6,758 feet (2,060 m)
- Spuhler Saddle, Madison County, Montana, 45°33′26″N 112°06′05″W, el. 8,625 feet (2,629 m)
- Stag Run, Musselshell County, Montana, 46°19′54″N 108°41′35″W, el. 3,274 feet (998 m)
- Steels Pass, Madison County, Montana, 45°39′39″N 112°27′41″W, el. 7,415 feet (2,260 m)
- Stemple Pass, Lewis and Clark County, Montana, 46°53′37″N 112°29′44″W, el. 6,384 feet (1,946 m)
- Steves Pass, Missoula County, Montana, 46°54′47″N 113°37′08″W, el. 4,829 feet (1,472 m)
- Stoney Indian Pass, Glacier County, Montana, 48°52′54″N 113°51′53″W, el. 6,903 feet (2,104 m)
- Storm Lake Pass, Deer Lodge County, Montana, 46°03′26″N 113°16′11″W, el. 9,130 feet (2,780 m)
- Stormy Pass, Ravalli County, Montana, 46°30′20″N 114°21′45″W, el. 7,346 feet (2,239 m)
- Straight Creek Pass, Lewis and Clark County, Montana, 47°21′07″N 112°45′19″W, el. 6,742 feet (2,055 m)
- Suicide Pass, Powder River County, Montana, 45°33′43″N 105°53′37″W, el. 4,091 feet (1,247 m)
- Sun River Pass, Teton County, Montana, 47°57′19″N 112°58′48″W, el. 6,256 feet (1,907 m)
- Sundance Pass, Carbon County, Montana, 45°06′15″N 109°34′04″W, el. 10,991 feet (3,350 m)
- Surprise Pass, Flathead County, Montana, 48°29′11″N 113°33′17″W, el. 5,741 feet (1,750 m)
- Swiftcurrent Pass, Glacier County, Montana, 48°46′42″N 113°45′51″W, el. 7,188 feet (2,191 m)
- Switchback Pass, Flathead County, Montana, 47°54′40″N 113°06′00″W, el. 7,802 feet (2,378 m)
- T L Gap, Teton County, Montana, 47°47′31″N 111°57′55″W, el. 3,934 feet (1,199 m)
- Targhee Pass, Gallatin County, Montana, 44°40′29″N 111°16′33″W, el. 7,080 feet (2,160 m)
- Taylor Divide, Blaine County, Montana, 48°18′48″N 109°22′01″W, el. 4,012 feet (1,223 m)
- Tepee Pass, Gallatin County, Montana, 45°05′57″N 111°09′28″W, el. 7,631 feet (2,326 m)
- Teton Pass, Flathead County, Montana, 47°58′36″N 112°53′33″W, el. 7,280 feet (2,220 m)
- The Divide, Fergus County, Montana, 47°41′53″N 109°47′27″W, el. 3,159 feet (963 m)
- The Gap, Fergus County, Montana, 47°02′15″N 109°35′40″W, el. 4,098 feet (1,249 m)
- The Notch, Madison County, Montana, 44°52′44″N 112°07′34″W, el. 8,678 feet (2,645 m)
- Theodore Roosevelt Pass, Flathead County, Montana, 48°15′55″N 113°35′24″W, el. 3,747 feet (1,142 m)
- Therriault Pass, Lincoln County, Montana, 48°55′11″N 114°52′02″W, el. 6,417 feet (1,956 m)
- Thompson Pass, Sanders County, Montana, 47°34′38″N 115°43′01″W, el. 4,859 feet (1,481 m)
- Tom Graham Pass, Madison County, Montana, 45°31′05″N 112°06′49″W, el. 7,572 feet (2,308 m)
- Took Creek Saddle, Ravalli County, Montana, 45°44′06″N 114°20′43″W, el. 5,837 feet (1,779 m)
- Took Ridge Saddle, Ravalli County, Montana, 45°43′25″N 114°18′59″W, el. 5,718 feet (1,743 m)
- Tough Creek Saddle, Ravalli County, Montana, 45°44′35″N 114°20′15″W, el. 6,014 feet (1,833 m)
- Trenk Pass, Carter County, Montana, 45°43′52″N 104°41′11″W, el. 3,829 feet (1,167 m)
- Triple Divide Pass, Glacier County, Montana, 48°34′27″N 113°30′48″W, el. 7,375 feet (2,248 m)
- Trixie Pass, Flathead County, Montana, 48°26′32″N 114°41′51″W, el. 5,315 feet (1,620 m)
- Twitchell Pass, McCone County, Montana, 47°51′01″N 106°02′42″W, el. 2,497 feet (761 m)
- Two Medicine Pass, Flathead County, Montana, 48°25′36″N 113°25′10″W, el. 7,362 feet (2,244 m)
- Two Y Junction, Missoula County, Montana, 46°41′42″N 113°50′03″W, el. 5,715 feet (1,742 m)
- Vacation Pass, Lake County, Montana, 47°18′25″N 113°54′13″W, el. 8,704 feet (2,653 m)
- Verde Saddle, Mineral County, Montana, 47°04′37″N 114°50′38″W, el. 5,036 feet (1,535 m)
- Vermilion Pass, Sanders County, Montana, 47°46′02″N 115°19′04″W, el. 6,033 feet (1,839 m)
- Wahoo Pass, Ravalli County, Montana, 46°09′41″N 114°30′54″W, el. 7,080 feet (2,160 m)
- Warren Pass, Granite County, Montana, 45°59′37″N 113°27′19″W, el. 8,625 feet (2,629 m)
- Welch-Gillispie Saddle, Granite County, Montana, 46°40′49″N 113°34′58″W, el. 5,485 feet (1,672 m)
- Welcome Pass, Lewis and Clark County, Montana, 47°20′28″N 112°43′36″W, el. 6,138 feet (1,871 m)
- Welcome Sawmill Saddle, Granite County, Montana, 46°36′44″N 113°44′48″W, el. 7,182 feet (2,189 m)
- Welcome Sawmill Saddle, Granite County, Montana, 46°37′00″N 113°47′34″W, el. 6,312 feet (1,924 m)
- West Fork Tyler Saddle, Granite County, Montana, 46°39′05″N 113°31′51″W, el. 6,040 feet (1,840 m)
- White River Pass, Powell County, Montana, 47°34′41″N 113°07′38″W, el. 7,592 feet (2,314 m)
- Whitetail Saddle, Granite County, Montana, 46°40′10″N 113°33′28″W, el. 5,259 feet (1,603 m)
- Wild Horse Pass, Rosebud County, Montana, 46°35′56″N 106°28′37″W, el. 3,061 feet (933 m)
- Wild Horse Pass, McCone County, Montana, 47°38′43″N 106°11′03″W, el. 2,447 feet (746 m)
- Williams Pass, Mineral County, Montana, 46°57′45″N 114°43′18″W, el. 4,265 feet (1,300 m)
- Willow Creek Pass, Sanders County, Montana, 47°53′27″N 115°17′01″W, el. 3,707 feet (1,130 m)
- Windy Pass, Gallatin County, Montana, 45°15′37″N 111°05′39″W, el. 9,258 feet (2,822 m)
- Windy Pass, Powell County, Montana, 47°07′36″N 112°54′01″W, el. 6,942 feet (2,116 m)
- Windy Pass, Lincoln County, Montana, 48°43′00″N 115°59′23″W, el. 5,256 feet (1,602 m)
- Windy Pass, Madison County, Montana, 45°40′35″N 111°58′03″W, el. 8,045 feet (2,452 m)
- Wolverine Pass, Park County, Montana, 45°03′39″N 110°01′09″W, el. 9,006 feet (2,745 m)
- Woods Creek Pass, Ravalli County, Montana, 45°31′50″N 114°26′11″W, el. 7,182 feet (2,189 m)
- Youngs Pass, Powell County, Montana, 47°14′56″N 113°15′42″W, el. 6,867 feet (2,093 m)

== See also ==
- List of mountain passes in Montana (A–L)
- List of mountains in Montana
- List of mountain ranges in Montana
