= Montana Highway 38 =

State highway in Montana, United States

Montana Highway 38
- MT 38 highlighted in red

Route information
- Maintained by MDT
- Length: 53.835 mi (86.639 km)
- Existed: 1924–present

Major junctions
- West end: US 93 in Grantsdale
- East end: MT 1 at Porters Corner

Location
- Country: United States
- State: Montana
- Counties: Ravalli, Granite

Highway system
- Montana Highway System; Interstate; US; State; Secondary
← MT 37	→ MT 39

Montana Highway 38 (MT 38), also known as Skalkaho Road or Skalkaho Highway, is a state highway in the US state of Montana approximately 53.8 miles (86.6 km) long. It provides seasonal direct land connections between the communities of Hamilton on the west and Philipsburg and Anaconda on the east via Skalkaho Pass.

The highway and the 7,258-foot-high (2,212 m) pass take their name from the Salish word Sq̓x̣q̓x̣ó, "many trails".

== Route description ==
MT 38 begins three miles (4.8 km) south of Hamilton, at an intersection with U.S. Highway 93 (US 93). Initially, the highway heads south along a former section of US 93. The road takes an abrupt turn eastward as it passes through Grantsdale, begins its meandering climb southeast along Skalkaho Creek and northeast along Daly Creek through the Sapphire Mountains, turning southeast again before it crosses Skalkaho Pass. From the pass, MT 38 descends along the West Fork Rock Creek, past the Gem Mountain sapphire mine and crosses Rock Creek near its headwaters, going into Eagle Canyon before making a northeasterly run to its terminus at MT 1, six miles (9.7 km) south of Philipsburg and 23 miles (37 km) west of Anaconda.

Except for its westernmost and easternmost segments, MT 38 is mostly gravel.

=== Winter closure ===
Due to heavy snowfall on the narrow winding road, MT 38 is closed from 14 miles (23 km) east of Daly Creek to 16 miles (26 km) west of Gem Mountain, usually from late November until Memorial Day weekend.

=== Scenic routes ===
Skalkaho Highway is part of, or links to, these scenic routes:

- The Skalkaho Highway Scenic Byway
- Philipsburg Scenic Loop (MT 38, Rock Creek Road, Montana Secondary Highway 348 and MT 1)
- Rock Creek Road Back Country Byway (connects to Interstate 90 east of Clinton at exit 126)
- Pintler Scenic Route (MT 1)

== Major intersections ==
County	Location	mi	km	Destinations	Notes
Ravalli	Grantsdale	0.000	0.000	US 93 – Darby, Hamilton	Western terminus
Granite	Porter's Corner	53.835	86.639	MT 1 – Phillipsburg, Anaconda	Eastern terminus
1.000 mi = 1.609 km; 1.000 km = 0.621 mi
