= John Long Mountains =

Mountain range in Montana, United States

- Location within Montana

Highest point
- Elevation: 7,923 ft (2,415 m)
- Coordinates: 46°26′16″N 113°26′52″W

Geography
- Country: United States
- State: Montana

The John Long Mountains, el. 7,923 feet (2,415 m), is a small mountain range northwest of Philipsburg, Montana in Granite County, Montana. The Beaverhead-Deerlodge National Forest and Lolo National Forest manage these mountains. A sizable roadless area of about 65,000 acres existed, as of 1990, in the John Long Mountains, centered on Silver King Mountain in the southern part of the range. It is unknown whether and to what extent this area's size has been reduced by logging. Lightly used trails traverse whitebark pine forests on the higher ridges, and forests of lodgepole pine, Douglas-fir, and heavy downfall on the eastern slopes. The western slopes have groves of douglas-fir amidst extensive grassy parks. Silver King Mountain is 7,581'.

The Babcock Mountain Bighorn Sheep Viewing Area, on the Rock Creek Road along the western edge of the John Longs, is an 8,000-acre area on the Lolo National Forest where bighorn sheep are commonly seen. Parking and hiking trails are provided.

There is some dispute as to whether the Quigg Peak roadless area, described in the Sapphire Mountains article, is really part of the John Long Mountains. If the Quigg Peak area is truly part of the John Long Mountains, then the highest point in the range would be Butte Cabin Ridge, el. 8,468'.

== See also ==
- List of mountain ranges in Montana
