= Quigley (disambiguation) =

Quigley is a surname.

Quigley may also refer to:

- Quigley, Montana, United States, an unincorporated community
- Quigley (film), a 2003 film starring Gary Busey
- Quigley (musician), American musician
- USCGC Quigley, formerly the United States Navy submarine chaser USS SC-22, a United States Coast Guard Cutter in commission from 1919 to 1922
- The Quigley, a water obstacle at Marine Corps Officer Candidates School
- Quigley's, a defunct chain of variety/department stores in the Los Angeles area

== See also ==
- Grace Quigley, a film starring Katharine Hepburn and Nick Nolte
- Quigley Down Under, a 1990 film starring Tom Selleck
- Heatter-Quigley Productions, an American television production company, co-founded by Bob Quigley
