= Philipsburg Historic District =

Philipsburg Historic District may refer to:

- Philipsburg Historic District (Philipsburg, Montana), listed on the National Register of Historic Places in Granite County, Montana
- Philipsburg Historic District (Philipsburg, Pennsylvania), listed on the National Register of Historic Places in Centre County, Pennsylvania
