= Maxville =

Maxville may refer to:

== Places ==
In the United States

- Maxville, Randolph County, Indiana, an unincorporated community
- Maxville, Spencer County, Indiana, an unincorporated community
- Maxville, Missouri
- Maxville, Montana
- Maxville, Ohio, an unincorporated community
- Maxville, Wisconsin, a town
- Maxville (community), Wisconsin, an unincorporated community

Elsewhere

- Maxville, Ontario, Canada

== Other ==
- Fisnik Maxville, Kosovo-Swiss film director

== See also ==
- Macksville (disambiguation)
