= Georgetown Lake (Montana) =

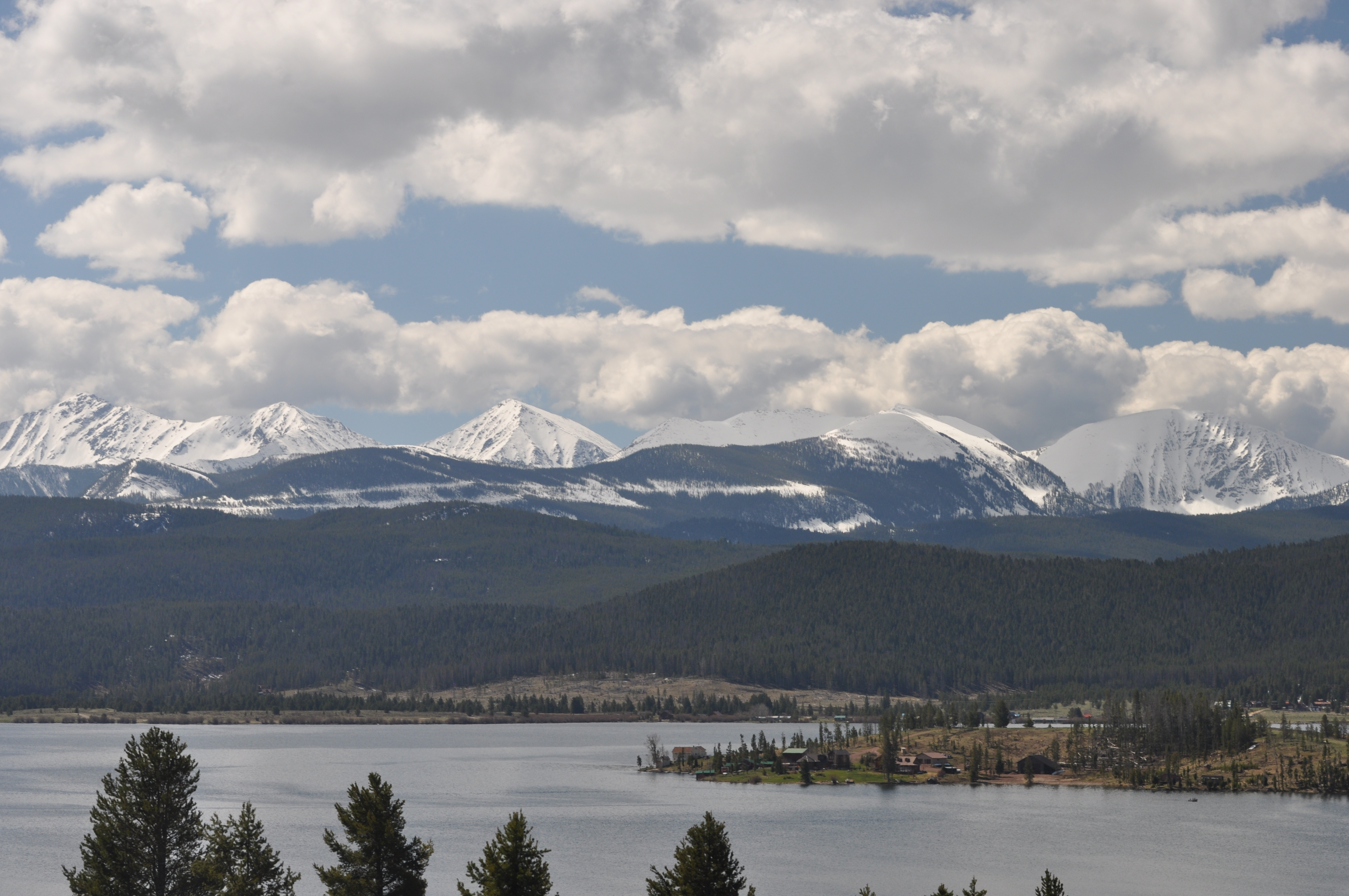
- Georgetown Lake from western shore

- Location within Montana
- Location: Granite County & Deer Lodge County, Montana, United States
- Coordinates: 46°11′09″N 113°17′28″W
- Type: Reservoir
- Primary inflows: North Fork Flint Creek
- Primary outflows: Flint Creek
- Built: 1885; 1901; 1919
- Surface area: 2,818.1 acres (1,140.4 ha)
- Average depth: 16 feet (4.9 m)
- Shore length^{1}: 17.36 miles (27.94 km)
- Surface elevation: 6,337 feet (1,932 m)
- ^{1} Shore length is not a well-defined measure.

Georgetown Lake is a 2,818-acre (1,140-hectare) reservoir in Deer Lodge and Granite Counties, Montana. The reservoir impounds the North Fork of Flint Creek and lies at an elevation of 6,337 feet (1,932 m) just west of the Anaconda Range. The reservoir is a popular recreational area with campgrounds, resorts and picnic areas along its 17.36 miles (27.94 km) shoreline.

== History ==
The reservoir was created in 1885 to produce power for the town of Phillipsburg and area mining operations.

Granite-Bimetallic Mining Company of Philipsburg completed construction of the Georgetown Dam and powerhouse in 1900. By 1906, the powerhouse was supplying electricity to the smelter in Anaconda. In 1909 the Anaconda Copper Mining Company bought the dam and powerhouse. The Montana Power Company assumed control of power generation in 1912. The powerhouse operated until 1990, when Montana Power mothballed the facility and sold the dam and generation facilities to Granite County.

The lake assumed the name of Georgetown when the dam flooded the area known as Georgetown Flats. Georgetown Flats was the location of a placer mining camp operated by George Cameron from 1867. By 1886, most of the residents of the Georgetown camp had abandoned the flats.

== Angling ==
Georgetown Lake is considered a Blue Ribbon fishery and holds trophy-sized rainbow and brook trout.
