= Anaconda–Pintler Wilderness =

Protected wilderness area in Montana, United States

- IUCN category Ib (wilderness area)
- Location within the United States
- Location: Montana, USA
- Nearest city: Butte, MT
- Coordinates: 45°57′N 113°28′W
- Area: 158,615 acres (641.89 km^{2})
- Established: 1964
- Governing body: U.S. Forest Service

The Anaconda–Pintler Wilderness is located in southwestern Montana, in the northwestern United States. It runs for 40 miles (64 km) along both sides of the crest of the Anaconda Range, covering almost 250 square miles (650 km^{2}). To the north are the Sapphire Mountains, and to the south is the Big Hole Valley. Elevations range from about 5,000 feet (1,500 m) up to 10,793 feet (3,290 m) at West Goat Peak. West Pintler Peak, located in a more commonly visited area, rises to 9,894 feet (3,016 m). Visitors can most easily access this area via trailheads at Pintler Lake to the south, and at Lutz Creek and Moose Lake to the north. The wilderness lies in parts of Deer Lodge, Granite, Ravalli, and Beaverhead counties.

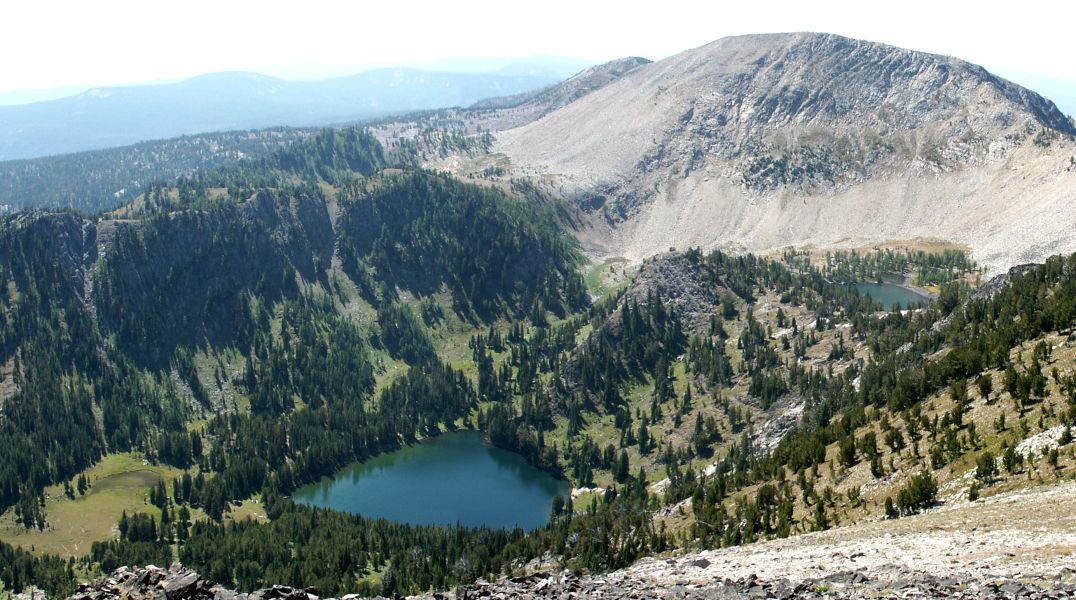
Oreamnos Lake and West Pintler Peak, looking west from the ridge near East Pintler Peak

This segment of mountains was designated as a Primitive Area in 1937, and reclassified as a Wilderness Area in 1964. It is administered jointly by the Beaverhead-Deerlodge and Bitterroot National Forests. In 1964, Montana's Senator Mike Mansfield requested the National Park Service study the area's potential as a national park. The park service declined to pursue the idea. The name is derived from the town and its copper mining company and from Charles and Katie Pintler, homesteaders who in 1885 settled along Pintler Creek between the Big Hole National Battlefield and Wisdom. The forest north of Pintler Pass, including Johnson Lake, was heavily burnt by the Mussigbrod and other fires of 2000.

Recreational opportunities abound. The mountains of this wilderness area and the excellent trail system make it a prime destination for peak baggers. West and East Goat Peaks, Warren Peak, Mount Evans, and Fish Peak are just a few of the 10,000 feet (3,000 m) plus peaks that can be scrambled with no technical equipment. Many lakes in this wilderness area are well-stocked with trout and are popular fishing destinations. Popular lakes include Upper Seymour, Edith, Ivanhoe and Johnson Lakes. Wildlife watchers can see mountain goats, Rocky Mountain big horn sheep, and pika.
