= Sapphire Mountains =

Mountain range in Montana, United States

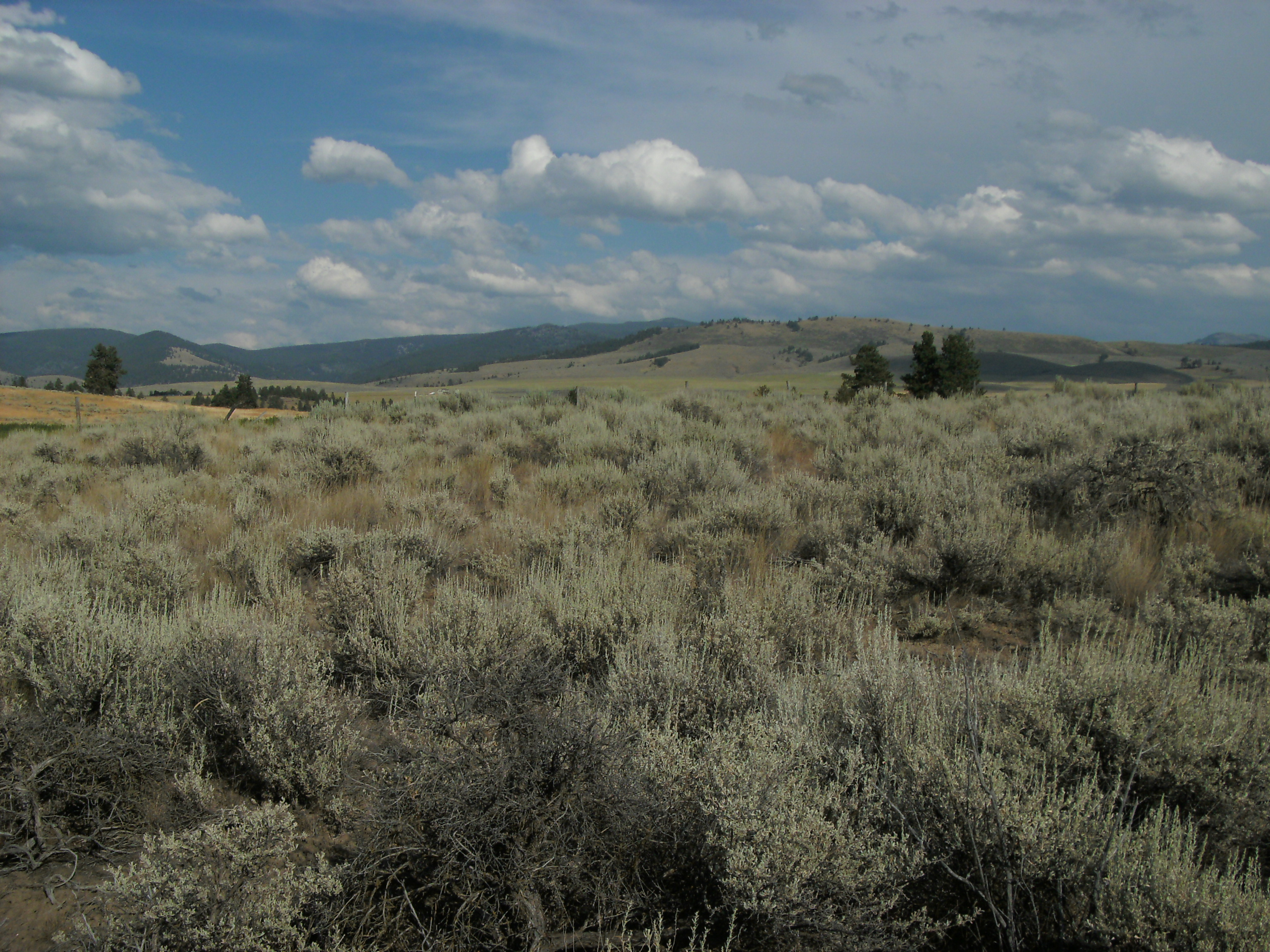
- The Sapphire Mountains as seen from the Bitterroot Valley

Highest point
- Peak: Kent Peak
- Elevation: 8,999 ft (2,743 m)
- Coordinates: 46°3′48″N 113°47′35″W

Geography
- Location within Montana
- Location: Montana, United States
- Country: United States
- State: Montana
- Nearest city: Missoula, MT
- Coordinates: 46°15′00″N 113°45′00″W
- Governing body: U.S. Forest Service

The Sapphire Mountains are a range of mountains located in southwestern Montana in the northwestern United States. From a point near the Clark Fork River and the city of Missoula, they run in a southerly direction for a distance of approximately 60 miles (100 km), making up much of the border between Ravalli County (to the west) and Granite County. To the west is the Bitterroot Valley, and to the east is Rock Creek. The southern end of the range meets the larger Anaconda Range at West Pintler Peak.

The northern segment of the range is part of the Lolo National Forest, while the south is part of the Deerlodge National Forest. The range also includes part of the Threemile Wildlife Management Area, the Welcome Creek Wilderness Area, the Skalkaho Game Preserve, and the Anaconda-Pintler Wilderness Area. The range is bisected by just two roads, Route 38 at 7250 foot (2210 m) Skalkaho Pass and FS80 at Lutz Creek.

Besides West Pintler Peak (considered part of the Anaconda Range), the highest point in the Sapphire Mountains is Kent Peak, located at 46°03.79'N and 113°47.61'W at an elevation of 8999 feet (2743 m).

The Sapphires contain three large National Forest roadless areas, in addition to the officially protected Welcome Creek Wilderness. The northernmost, about 77,000 acres in size, is centered on Quigg Peak, el. 8419 ft. This area is characterized by thousands of acres of sliderock or talus slopes, and extensive Douglas-fir and lodgepole pine forests rising to open, glaciated ridges. Bighorn sheep and mountain goats utilize the area. U.S. Senator Jon Tester, (D. Mont.) has proposed about 8,275 acres of the Quigg Peak roadless area be designated wilderness in his proposed wilderness bill, S.B. 1470, the Senate Jobs and Recreation Act of 2009. There is some dispute as to whether the Quigg Peak area is part of the Sapphires or the adjacent John Long Mountains.

Just south of the Welcome Creek Wilderness are (as of 1992) 103,000 acres of roadless country called the "Stony Mountain" roadless area. The Skalkaho Game Preserve is within it. A feature of this roadless area is Fuse Lake, which contains rare Arctic grayling.

Finally, about 117,000 acres of roadless country in the southern Sapphires are connected via a narrow roadless spur to the Anaconda-Pintlar Wilderness, in the Anaconda Range, for a total roadless area (again, as of 1992) of 368,000 acres. Wolke describes this part of the Sapphires as "lower rolling mountains, mostly under 9,000 feet and heavily forested, except for parts of the rocky crest." About 98,000 acres of this roadless area are protected as a Wilderness Study Area.

Sapphires of gem quality are found in the region. They were first found in this region at Rock Creek near Philipsburg in 1892. Rock Creek, also known as Gem Mountain, has been the most productive site in Montana for sapphires by far, even more so than Yogo Gulch, producing over 190 million carats of sapphires. Garnets are also found here.

== See also ==
- List of mountain ranges in Montana
- Yogo sapphire
- Skalkaho Pass
