= Eyebrow (disambiguation) =

An eyebrow is a line of hair above the human eye.

Eyebrow may also refer to:

- Eyebrows (advertisement), a British advertising campaign for Cadbury chocolate
- Eyebrow, Saskatchewan, a village in the Canadian province of Saskatchewan
- Rural Municipality of Eyebrow No. 193, Saskatchewan, the rural municipality that surrounds the village
- The Eyebrow, a mountain in Montana
- Monkey's Eyebrow, Kentucky, a rural community
- Supercilium, a plumage feature, also known as the "eyebrow", of a bird
- Head louse, an obligate ectoparasite, also known as Eyebrow lice
- An eyebrow window

== See also ==
- IBrowse, a web browser for Amiga computers
- 眉 (disambiguation)
