= Discovery Ski Area =

Ski area in Montana, United States

- Location in Montana Discovery Ski Area (the United States)
- Location: Granite County, Montana
- Nearest city: Philipsburg, Montana
- Coordinates: 46°15′23″N 113°14′31″W
- Top elevation: 8,158 feet (2,487 m)
- Base elevation: 6,480 feet (1,980 m)
- Skiable area: 2,200 acres (8.9 km^{2})
- Trails: 67
- Longest run: 1.5 miles (2.4 km)
- Lift system: 5 triples, 2 doubles, 1 surface
- Snowfall: 215 "
- Website: Official website

Discovery Ski Area is an alpine ski area in the southwestern part of the state of Montana, United States. Situated on Rumsey and Jubilee mountains, in the Flint Creek Range, the area consists of four different faces and provides for beginner groomed runs to expert bowl skiing. The area has seven lifts for Downhill, Telemark and cross-country skiing. The ski area sits on the west side of the continental divide at a base elevation of just over 6000 feet. Discovery is usually only open on weekends to begin the season, but days and hours will often expand through the winter season.

== Location ==
Discovery is located in western part of the state of Montana near Georgetown Lake off Montana Highway 1. Discovery Ski Area is located in the Beaverhead–Deerlodge National Forest.
