= New Chicago =

New Chicago may refer to:

- New Chicago, California
- New Chicago, Indiana
- New Chicago, Montana
- New Chicago, Memphis, part of North Memphis, Memphis, Tennessee
- New Chicago, Jefferson Township, Montgomery County, Ohio
- A former nickname for Deming, New Mexico

== See also ==
- Nueva Chicago (disambiguation)
