= Welcome Creek Wilderness =

Protected natural area in Montana, United States

- IUCN category Ib (wilderness area)
- Location within the United States
- Location: Granite County, Montana, United States
- Nearest city: Missoula, MT
- Coordinates: 46°36′N 113°31′W
- Area: 28,135 acres (113.86 km^{2})
- Established: 1978
- Governing body: U.S. Forest Service

The Welcome Creek Wilderness is located in the U.S. state of Montana. Created by an act of Congress in 1978, the wilderness is within Lolo National Forest, and protects the northern portion of the Sapphire Mountains.

U.S. Wilderness Areas do not allow motorized or mechanized vehicles, including bicycles. Although camping and fishing are allowed with proper permit, no roads or buildings are constructed and there is also no logging or mining, in compliance with the 1964 Wilderness Act. Wilderness areas within National Forests and Bureau of Land Management areas also allow hunting in season.

The Wilderness, which preserves a chunk of generally lower-elevation forest, is characterized by rough, steep breaks and slopes covered in dense forests of lodgepole pine. Some old-growth lodgepole pine is present, as are groves of spruce and douglas-fir. Wildlife includes elk, mountain lion, bobcat, pine marten, mink and weasel.

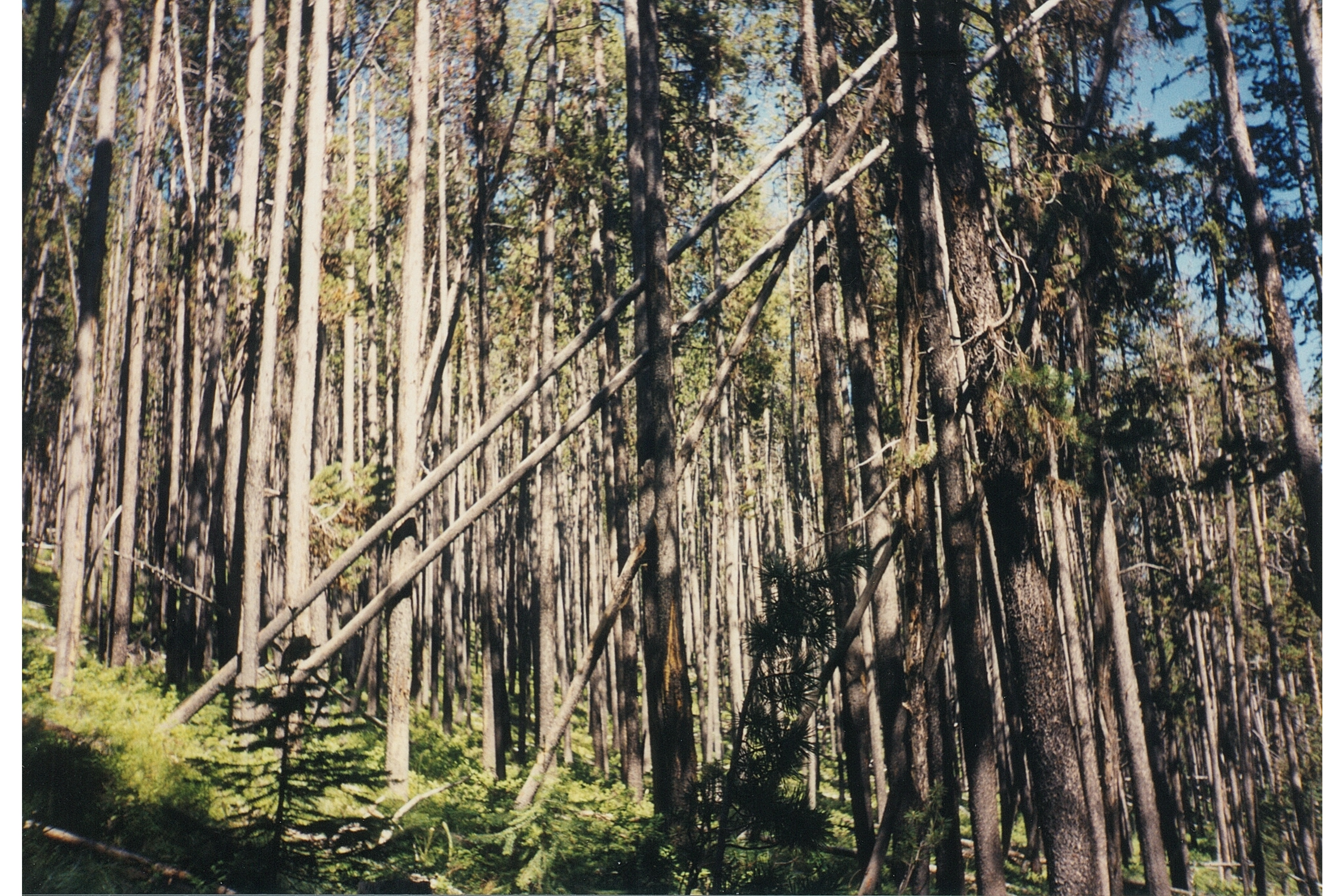
Lodgepole pine forest in Welcome Creek Wilderness

The area has a rich human history as well, as gold was discovered in Welcome Creek in 1888. One of the largest gold nuggets ever found in Montana, weighing in at 1.5 pounds, was found in Welcome Creek during this period. When the mines were abandoned, the area became a hideout for fugitives like outlaw Frank Brady, who was killed in a 1904 shootout at a cabin in Welcome Creek. Today, the crumbling remains of about a dozen miner's cabins dot the Wilderness, though only two are in fair condition, one of them at the mouth of Cinnabar Creek.
