= Skalkaho Pass =

Mountain pass in Montana, United States

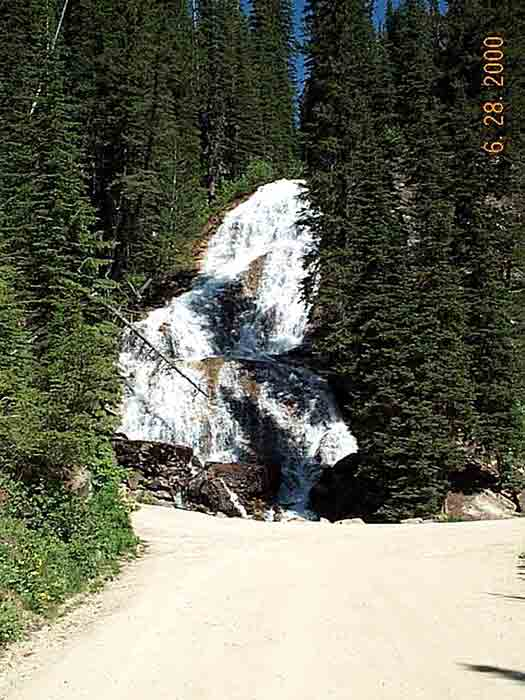
- Skalkaho Falls near the head of the pass.
- Interactive map of Skalkaho Pass
- Elevation: 7,258 ft (2,212 m)
- Traversed by: Montana Highway 38

Third Approach
- Location: Ravalli County, Montana, United States
- Range: Sapphire Mountains
- Coordinates: 46°14′45″N 113°46′24″W
- Topo map: USGS Skalkaho Pass

The Skalkaho Pass (Salish: Sq̓x̣q̓x̣ó, "many trails"), 7,258 feet (2,212 m) above sea level, is a pass in the Sapphire Mountains in southwest Montana traversed by Montana Highway 38.

The road over the pass connects the towns of Hamilton in the Bitterroot Valley and Philipsburg in Flint Creek Valley and remains the only direct route between these two important agricultural areas. Originally an Indian route, Highway 38 was built in 1924 to link mountainous mining areas with the agricultural settlements in the valleys. The route is closed during winter due to heavy snowfall.

Skalkaho Falls (46°15′28″N 113°49′36″W) is near the top of the pass.

== See also ==
- Mountain passes in Montana
