= List of mountains in Granite County, Montana =

There are at least 59 named mountains in Granite County, Montana.

- Anaconda Hill, 46°49′55″N 113°20′56″W, el. 6,214 feet (1,894 m)
- Anderson Hill, 46°49′08″N 113°19′21″W, el. 6,854 feet (2,089 m)
- Babcock Mountain, 46°40′45″N 113°38′24″W, el. 6,361 feet (1,939 m)
- Burnt Mountain, 46°40′38″N 113°36′12″W, el. 6,365 feet (1,940 m)
- Cable Mountain, 46°15′10″N 113°11′36″W, el. 8,143 feet (2,482 m)
- Cinnabar Point, 46°33′59″N 113°48′14″W, el. 7,241 feet (2,207 m)
- Cinnamon Bear Point, 46°33′24″N 113°46′14″W, el. 7,080 feet (2,160 m)
- Congdon Peak, 46°05′10″N 113°46′16″W, el. 8,894 feet (2,711 m)
- Cutaway Mountain, 46°01′50″N 113°21′53″W, el. 9,206 feet (2,806 m)
- Douglas Mountain, 46°29′48″N 113°09′05″W, el. 6,217 feet (1,895 m)
- Duffy Hill, 46°19′50″N 113°17′55″W, el. 5,331 feet (1,625 m)
- Eagle Point, 46°22′57″N 113°47′58″W, el. 7,979 feet (2,432 m)
- East Hill, 46°40′07″N 113°35′02″W, el. 6,132 feet (1,869 m)
- Emerine Mount, 46°11′16″N 113°38′01″W, el. 8,629 feet (2,630 m)
- Fisher Point, Granite County, 46°24′42″N 113°39′54″W, el. 6,913 feet (2,107 m)
- Fox Peak, Granite County, 46°06′07″N 113°45′58″W, el. 8,783 feet (2,677 m)
- Franklin Hill, 46°19′15″N 113°15′58″W, el. 6,818 feet (2,078 m)
- Goat Mountain, 46°23′00″N 113°03′55″W, el. 9,190 feet (2,800 m)
- Golden Mountain, 46°38′27″N 113°35′05″W, el. 6,617 feet (2,017 m)
- Green Mountain, Granite County, 46°24′47″N 113°45′28″W, el. 6,857 feet (2,090 m)
- Harvey Point, Granite County, 46°36′54″N 113°23′50″W, el. 6,293 feet (1,918 m)
- Henderson Mountain, 46°27′23″N 113°19′03″W, el. 7,100 feet (2,200 m)
- Hickey Hill, 46°23′19″N 113°09′37″W, el. 7,493 feet (2,284 m)
- Hogback Point, 46°27′38″N 113°38′50″W, el. 8,166 feet (2,489 m)
- Hope Hill, 46°20′29″N 113°16′14″W, el. 6,339 feet (1,932 m)
- King Mountain, 46°44′03″N 113°10′55″W, el. 6,630 feet (2,020 m)
- Kurt Peak, 46°02′12″N 113°17′22″W, el. 9,977 feet (3,041 m)
- Medicine Tree Hill, 46°41′58″N 113°28′01″W, el. 4,104 feet (1,251 m)
- Moose Mountain, 46°05′18″N 113°38′00″W, el. 7,897 feet (2,407 m)
- Mount Baldy, 46°44′17″N 113°25′13″W, el. 6,926 feet (2,111 m)
- Mount Princeton, Granite County, 46°26′59″N 113°07′42″W, el. 7,900 feet (2,400 m)
- Mount Tiny, 46°03′34″N 113°16′27″W, el. 9,869 feet (3,008 m)
- Nineteen ten Ridge, 46°49′45″N 113°22′12″W, el. 6,250 feet (1,900 m)
- Nirling Hill, 46°33′56″N 113°19′16″W, el. 5,679 feet (1,731 m)
- Pierre Hill, 46°23′46″N 113°07′31″W, el. 7,103 feet (2,165 m)
- Quigg Peak, 46°28′56″N 113°43′06″W, el. 8,330 feet (2,540 m)
- Racetrack Peak, 46°21′11″N 113°03′34″W, el. 9,367 feet (2,855 m)
- Rainbow Mountain, 46°03′07″N 113°19′12″W, el. 9,642 feet (2,939 m)
- Ram Mountain, 46°22′25″N 113°34′56″W, el. 6,837 feet (2,084 m)
- Red Hill, 46°21′13″N 113°17′12″W, el. 5,938 feet (1,810 m)
- Red Lion Mountain, 46°17′13″N 113°11′57″W, el. 8,733 feet (2,662 m)
- Rose Mountain, 46°26′40″N 113°02′56″W, el. 8,589 feet (2,618 m)
- Rumsey Mountain, 46°15′45″N 113°14′50″W, el. 8,159 feet (2,487 m)
- Senate Mountain, 45°59′33″N 113°33′41″W, el. 8,697 feet (2,651 m)
- Silver King Mountain, 46°30′28″N 113°27′33″W, el. 7,848 feet (2,392 m)
- Sliderock Mountain, 46°35′19″N 113°33′18″W, el. 7,789 feet (2,374 m)
- Solomon Mountain, 46°37′56″N 113°41′00″W, el. 6,893 feet (2,101 m)
- Spink Point, 46°33′02″N 113°36′36″W, el. 7,267 feet (2,215 m)
- Strawberry Mountain, Granite County, 46°37′44″N 113°32′33″W, el. 6,808 feet (2,075 m)
- Sugarloaf, Granite County, 46°33′11″N 113°16′46″W, el. 5,007 feet (1,526 m)
- Sunrise Mountain, 46°29′11″N 113°19′29″W, el. 6,608 feet (2,014 m)
- Table Mountain, Granite County, 46°04′24″N 113°43′06″W, el. 8,455 feet (2,577 m)
- The Eyebrow, 46°31′57″N 113°16′09″W, el. 4,964 feet (1,513 m)
- Twin Peaks, Granite County, 46°17′12″N 113°08′13″W, el. 9,039 feet (2,755 m)
- Tyler Point, 46°38′33″N 113°28′01″W, el. 6,877 feet (2,096 m)
- Union Peak, Granite County, 46°48′28″N 113°23′56″W, el. 6,821 feet (2,079 m)
- Warren Peak, Granite County, 45°59′12″N 113°27′37″W, el. 10,407 feet (3,172 m)
- Welcome Hill, 46°13′49″N 113°08′23″W, el. 8,756 feet (2,669 m)
- West Fork Buttes, 46°16′12″N 113°34′03″W, el. 7,064 feet (2,153 m)

== See also ==
- List of mountains in Montana
- List of mountain ranges in Montana
