= New Chicago, Montana =

Coordinates: 46°37′37″N 113°08′32″W

New Chicago
- Ghost town and Unincorporated Community
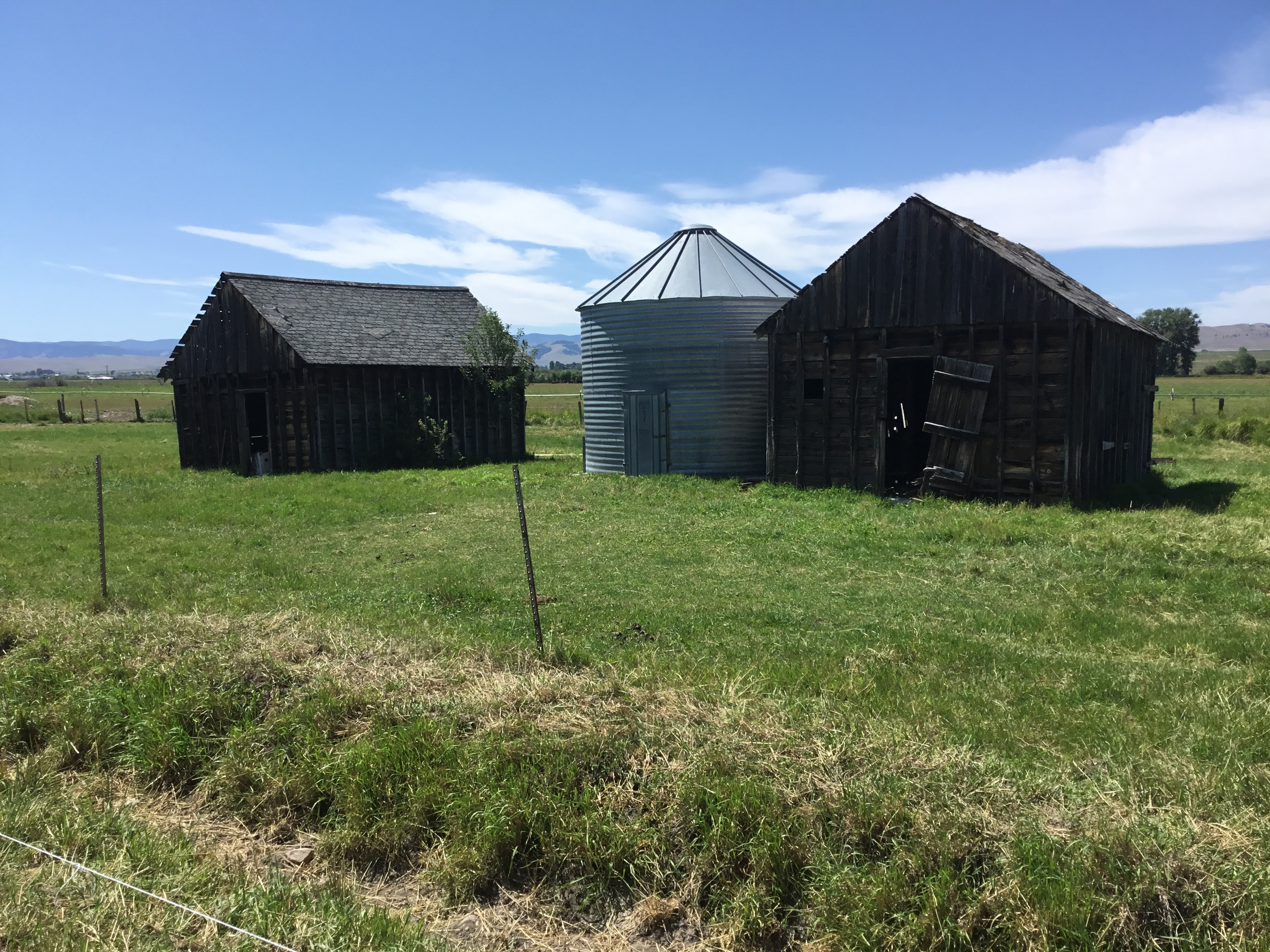
- Old barn and silo, abandoned home
- Interactive map of New Chicago
- Country: United States
- State: Montana
- County: Granite
- Founded by: John A. Featherman
- Elevation: 4,039 ft (1,231 m)
- GNIS feature ID: 787960

New Chicago, also known as West Chicago (as it was originally named) is a ghost town and unincorporated community in Granite County, Montana, United States. It is on the west bank of Flint Creek. It is located 2.85 miles (1.77 km) south of Drummond on a gravel trail off the Pintler Veterans Memorial Scenic Highway, better known as Montana Highway 1. New Chicago formerly had amenities, consisting of two hotels, two stores, a flour mill, a telegraph station, a Wells Fargo office, and a Post Office. The rest of the area is now inhabited by fair-sized ranches. The community is served by the post offices in Hall and Drummond.

== Resources ==
- New Chicago on Google Maps
