= Anaconda Range =

Mountain range in southwestern Montana, USA

- View of the Anaconda or "Pintler" Range near Anaconda, Montana

Highest point
- Peak: West Goat Peak
- Elevation: 10,793 ft (3,290 m)
- Coordinates: 45°57′N 113°28′W

Geography
- Location within Montana
- Country: United States
- State: Montana
- Parent range: Rocky Mountains

The Anaconda Range, informally known as the "Pintlers", is a group of high mountains located in southwestern Montana, in the northwestern United States. The mountain range takes its name from the nearby town of Anaconda, founded by Marcus Daly in 1883. It runs northeast approximately 50 miles (80 km) from Lost Trail Pass to a point near the community of Anaconda, covering parts of Ravalli, Deer Lodge, Granite and Beaverhead Counties. To the northwest are the Sapphire Mountains, to the south is the Big Hole Valley. Due north, the range blends into the Flint Creek Range, and to the southeast lies the Big Hole River and Pioneer Mountains. The crest of the range is part of the Continental Divide, rising to 10,793 feet (3,290 m) at West Goat Peak. Other major summits include Mt. Evans (10,641 ft, 3,243 m), Mt. Haggin (10,607 ft, 3,233 m), Warren Peak (10,463 ft, 3,189 m), and East Goat Peak (10,399 ft, 3,170 m). West Pintler Peak, located in a more commonly visited area, rises to 9,894 feet (3,016 m). Much of the range is protected in the Anaconda-Pintler Wilderness Area.

== Climate ==
Climate data for West Goat Peak 45.9602 N, 113.3933 W, Elevation: 10,036 ft (3,059 m) (1991–2020 normals)
Month	Jan	Feb	Mar	Apr	May	Jun	Jul	Aug	Sep	Oct	Nov	Dec	Year
Mean daily maximum °F (°C)	21.8 (−5.7)	21.5 (−5.8)	26.2 (−3.2)	31.2 (−0.4)	40.6 (4.8)	49.4 (9.7)	60.7 (15.9)	60.7 (15.9)	51.6 (10.9)	37.8 (3.2)	26.2 (−3.2)	20.6 (−6.3)	37.4 (3.0)
Daily mean °F (°C)	14.3 (−9.8)	12.8 (−10.7)	16.5 (−8.6)	21.0 (−6.1)	29.7 (−1.3)	37.9 (3.3)	47.6 (8.7)	47.5 (8.6)	39.2 (4.0)	28.0 (−2.2)	18.8 (−7.3)	13.4 (−10.3)	27.2 (−2.6)
Mean daily minimum °F (°C)	6.8 (−14.0)	4.1 (−15.5)	6.7 (−14.1)	10.8 (−11.8)	18.8 (−7.3)	26.3 (−3.2)	34.4 (1.3)	34.2 (1.2)	26.9 (−2.8)	18.2 (−7.7)	11.5 (−11.4)	6.2 (−14.3)	17.1 (−8.3)
Average precipitation inches (mm)	3.50 (89)	4.00 (102)	5.34 (136)	6.87 (174)	6.87 (174)	7.71 (196)	2.75 (70)	2.83 (72)	3.30 (84)	3.95 (100)	4.40 (112)	4.09 (104)	55.61 (1,413)
Source: PRISM Climate Group

== Gallery ==
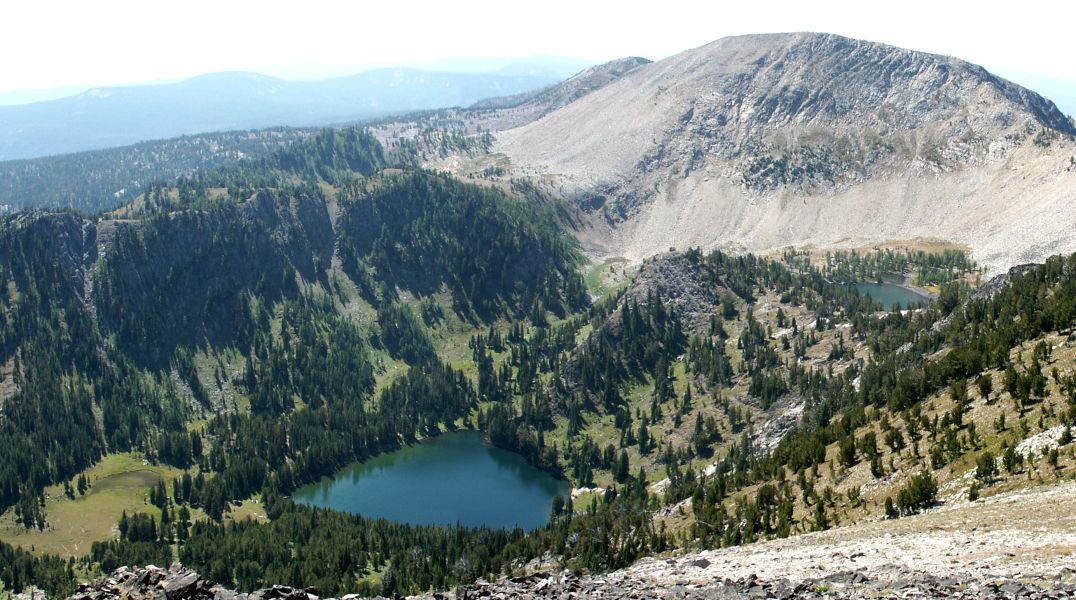
Oreamnos Lake and West Pintler Peak, looking west from the ridge near East Pintler Peak

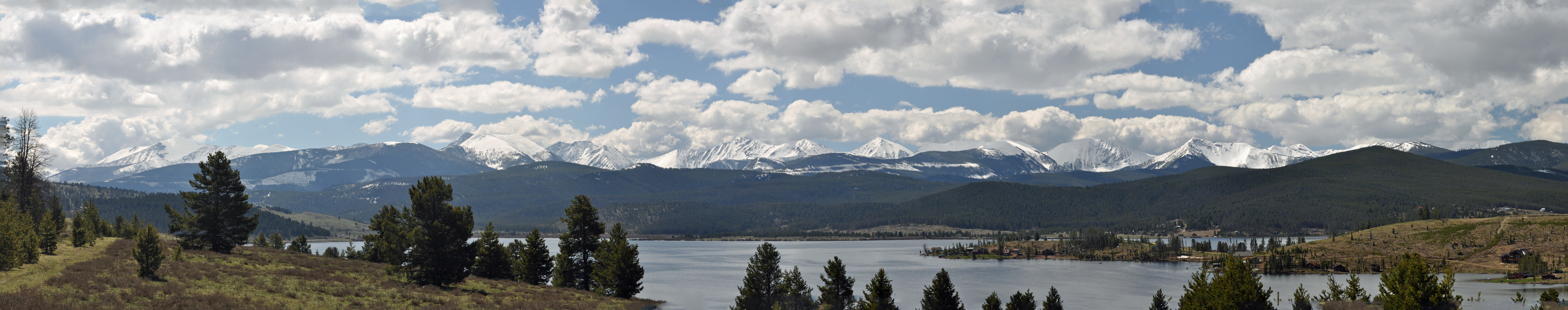
West face of Anaconda Range from Georgetown Lake

== See also ==
- List of mountain ranges in Montana
