= Grantsdale, Montana =

- Unincorporated community
- Location within Montana Location within the United States
- Coordinates: 46°12′13″N 114°08′30″W
- Country: United States
- State: Montana
- County: Ravalli
- Elevation: 3,675 ft (1,120 m)
- Time zone: UTC-7 (Mountain (MST))
  - Summer (DST): UTC-6 (MDT)
- ZIP code: 59835
- Area code: 406
- GNIS feature ID: 784190

Grantsdale is an unincorporated community in Ravalli County, Montana, United States. Grantsdale is located near U.S. Route 93 and Montana Highway 38, 3 miles (4.8 km) south of Hamilton. The community had a post office until October 29, 1988; it retains its own ZIP code, 59835.

Initially called Skalkaho Creek, the town became Grantsdale in about 1888 after H. H. Grant, the town's founder.
