= Nimrod, Montana =

Ghost town in Montana, United States

Coordinates: 46°42′01″N 113°28′38″W

Nimrod is a ghost town in Granite County, Montana, United States. The GNIS classifies it as a populated place.

A post office called Nimrod was established in 1915, and remained in operation until 1962. The community was named after Nimrod, since this was a hunters' paradise.
