= Macksville =

Macksville may refer to:

- Macksville, Kansas, United States
- Macksville, New South Wales, Australia
- Macksville, West Virginia, United States

== See also ==
- Maxville (disambiguation)
