= Willow Creek Pass (Montana) =

Mountain pass in Montana, United States

- Interactive map of Willow Creek Pass (Montana)
- Elevation: 3,711 ft (1,131 m)

Third Approach
- Location: Lincoln / Sanders counties, Montana, United States
- Range: Cabinet Mountains
- Coordinates: 47°53′27″N 115°17′1″W
- Topo map: USGS Miller Lake (MT)

Willow Creek Pass is a mountain pass on the border between Lincoln and Sanders Counties in the U.S. state of Montana. Located at 47°53′27″N 115°17′1″W (47.8907736, -115.2834951), its elevation is 3,707 feet (1,130 m). The pass is near the head of Willow Creek. The pass is approximately 18.8 miles (30¾ km) from Thompson Falls and near the community of Sanders.

The pass is also on the boundary between Kaniksu National Forest on the south and Kootenai National Forest on the north. Forest Road 7160 crosses the pass, which is just east of Moose Peak (6,010 feet). US Forest Service campgrounds are found on both sides of the pass. Willow Creek, which heads near the pass, is a tributary of the Vermillion River, itself a tributary of the Clark Fork River.

== See also ==
- Mountain passes in Montana
