= Miners Union Hall =

- U.S. National Register of Historic Places
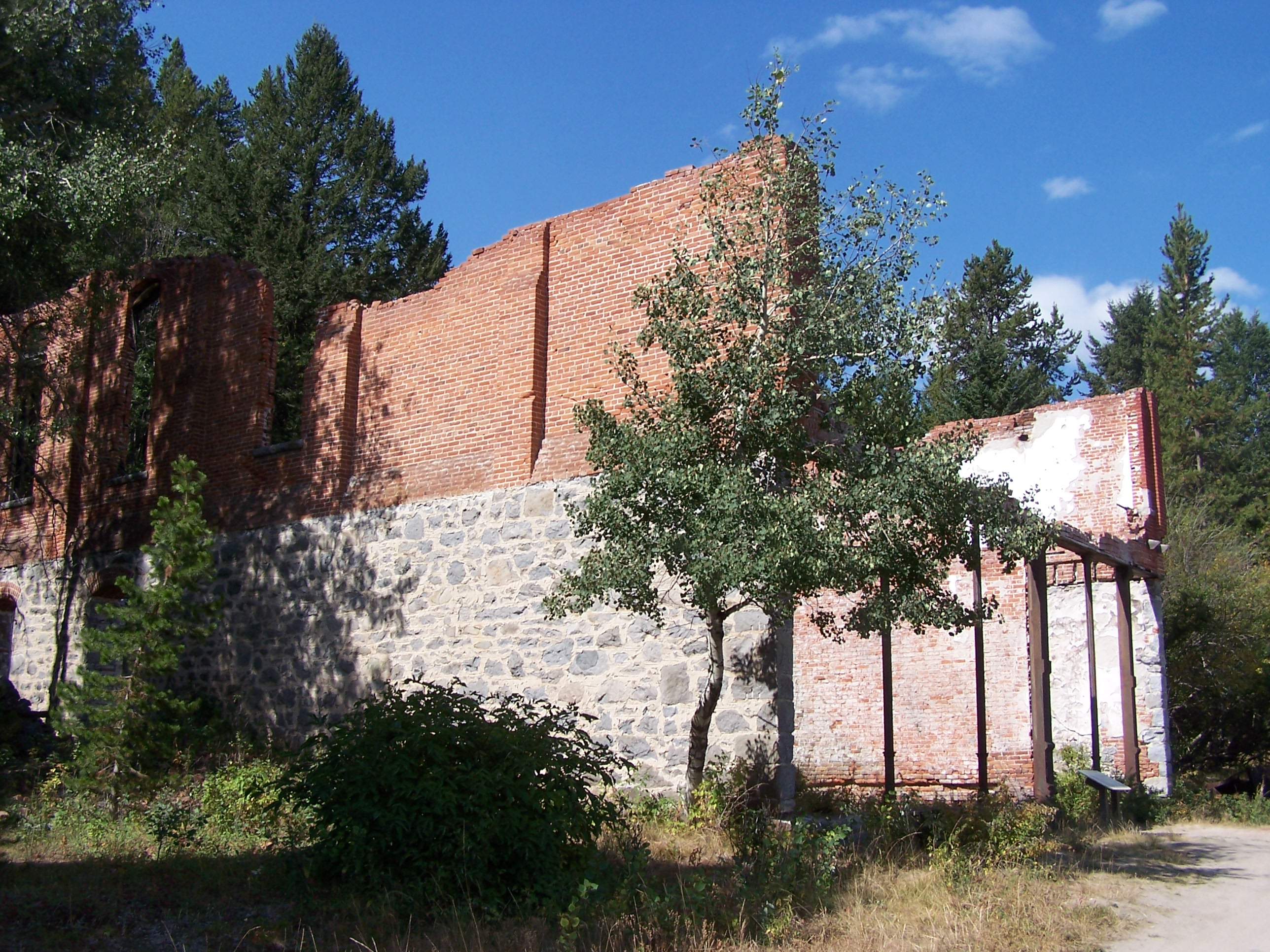
- Remnants of the building

- Location within Montana Location within the United States
- Location: East of Philipsburg in Deerlodge National Forest
- Nearest city: Philipsburg, Montana
- Coordinates: 46°19′4″N 113°14′55″W
- Area: less than one acre
- Built: 1890
- NRHP reference No.: 74001096
- Added to NRHP: December 19, 1974

Miners Union Hall, located east of Philipsburg, Montana in Deerlodge National Forest, is a historic building built in 1890. Also known as Granite Miners Union Hall, it served as a meeting hall. It was listed on the National Register of Historic Places in 1974.

In its first floor was a pool parlor and a club area; on the second floor was a large dance floor, an auditorium space, and an office and library.
