= Nez Perce Pass =

- Location within Idaho
- Elevation: 6,587 ft (2,008 m)
- Traversed by: Unpaved road

Third Approach
- Location: Idaho County, Idaho / Ravalli County, Montana, United States
- Range: Bitterroot Mountains; Rocky Mountains
- Coordinates: 45°43.0′N 114°30.2′W
- Topo map: Nez Perce Peak Quad

Nez Perce Pass is a mountain pass in the Bitterroot Mountains on the border between the U.S. states of Idaho and Montana. The pass is at an elevation of 6,587 feet (2,008 m) above sea level. The Nez Perce Pass Trailhead offers access to the Selway–Bitterroot Wilderness and the Frank Church–River of No Return Wilderness.

The pass is located "between Wildernesses nearly twice as large as the combined states of Delaware and Rhode Island," on what is "probably one of the wildest roads in the United States."

To the north is the 1.2-million-acre Selway–Bitterroot Wilderness and to the south the 2.2-million-acre Frank Church–River of No Return Wilderness. These areas comprise over 11% of the Congressionally established Wilderness area in the 48 contiguous states.

A sign honoring Doris Milner of Hamilton, Montana, "graces the Montana side" of the pass. "A sign honoring Idaho Senator Frank Church identifies the Idaho side ... Both Milner and Church helped add thousands of square miles of Montana and Idaho forest to the nation's wilderness system."

Forest Road 468, Nez Perce Road, also known as Magruder Corridor Road, crosses the pass. It is unpaved, and has no services for 117 miles. "The road has changed little since its construction by the Civilian Conservation Corps (CCC) during the 1930s. It has been known by several names, such as The Southern Nez Perce Trail, The Elk City to Darby Road, The Montana Road, and The Parker Trail." "The landscape is much the same as when the Nez Perce and early travelers crossed the area."

"From Darby, Montana travel south 4.3 miles on Highway 93, turn south on the West Fork Road and proceed for approximately 14.3 miles. Turn west (right) on Forest Road 468, Nez Perce Road and travel for approximately 16.1 miles" to Nez Perce Pass trailhead." The paved parking area at the pass has a helicopter pad.

Nez Perce Pass marks a change in time zone, from Pacific time in northern Idaho to Mountain time in Montana.

== See also ==
- Mountain passes in Montana
