= Philipsburg Historic District (Philipsburg, Montana) =

Historic district in Montana, United States

- U.S. National Register of Historic Places
- U.S. Historic district
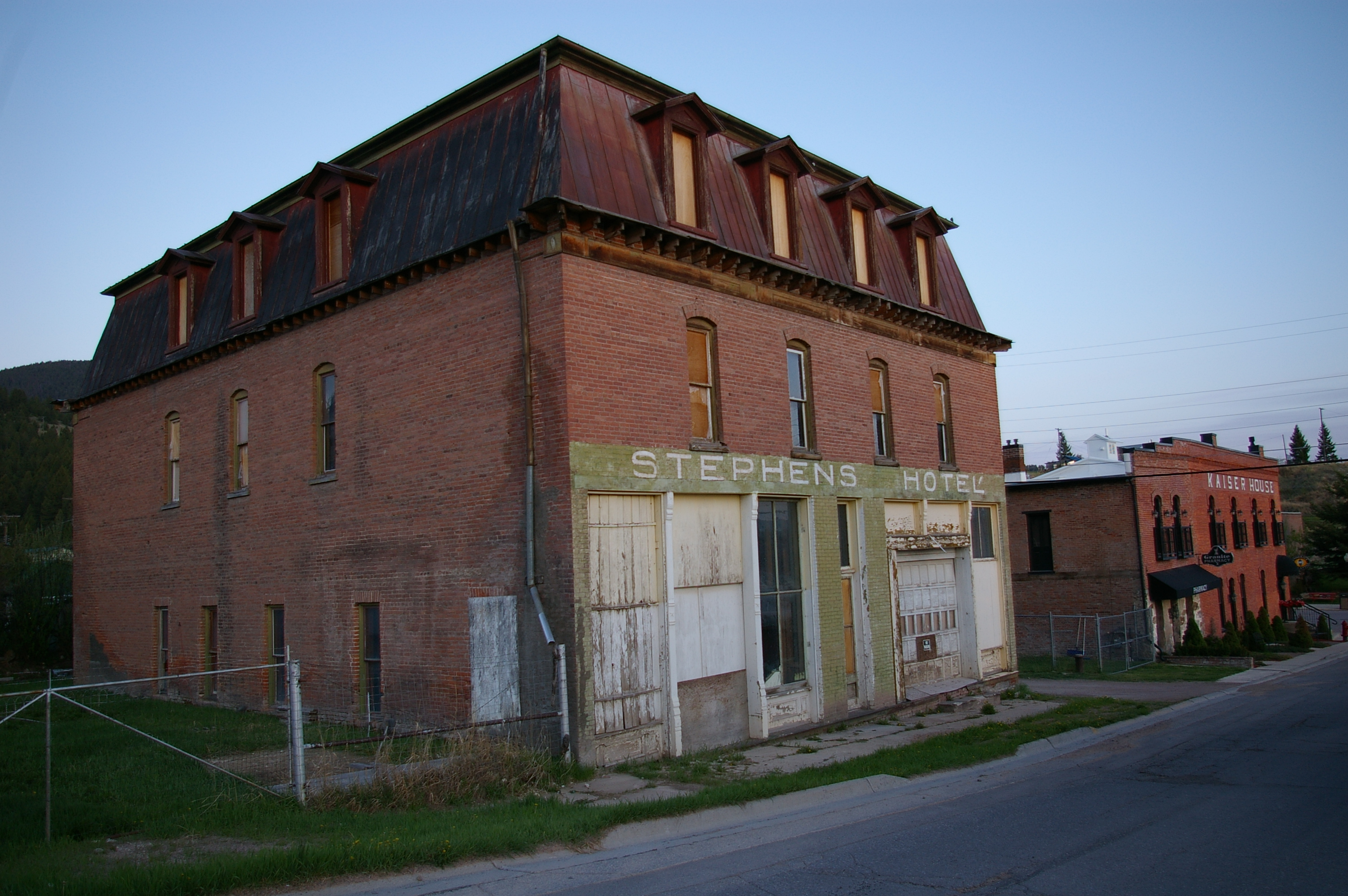
- Stephens Hotel, also known as the Kaiser House Annex

- Location within Montana Location within the United States
- Location: Roughly bounded by Gamma St. and Cleveland Ave., Montgomery, Madison and Duffy, and Cedar and McDonald Sts., Philipsburg, Montana
- Coordinates: 46°20′03″N 113°17′38″W
- Area: 87 acres (35 ha)
- Architect: Link & Haire; Et al.
- Architectural style: Classical Revival, Bungalow/craftsman, Late Victorian
- MPS: Philipsburg Montana MRA
- NRHP reference No.: 86002791
- Added to NRHP: September 30, 1986

The Philipsburg Historic District is a 87-acre (35 ha) historic district in Philipsburg, Montana that was listed on the U.S. National Register of Historic Places in 1986. It includes work by architects Link & Haire and by other architects, among its 154 contributing buildings. It includes the separately NRHP-listed Granite County Jail.

The district includes "the major commercial, residential, governmental and religious structures" in the town.
