= Nueva Chicago =

Nueva Chicago can mean:

- the Mataderos barrio of Buenos Aires, which is also called Nueva Chicago, or
- the Club Atlético Nueva Chicago football club, which is based there

== See also ==
- New Chicago (disambiguation)
