= M.E. Doe House =

Historic house in Montana, United States

- M. E. Doe House
- U.S. National Register of Historic Places
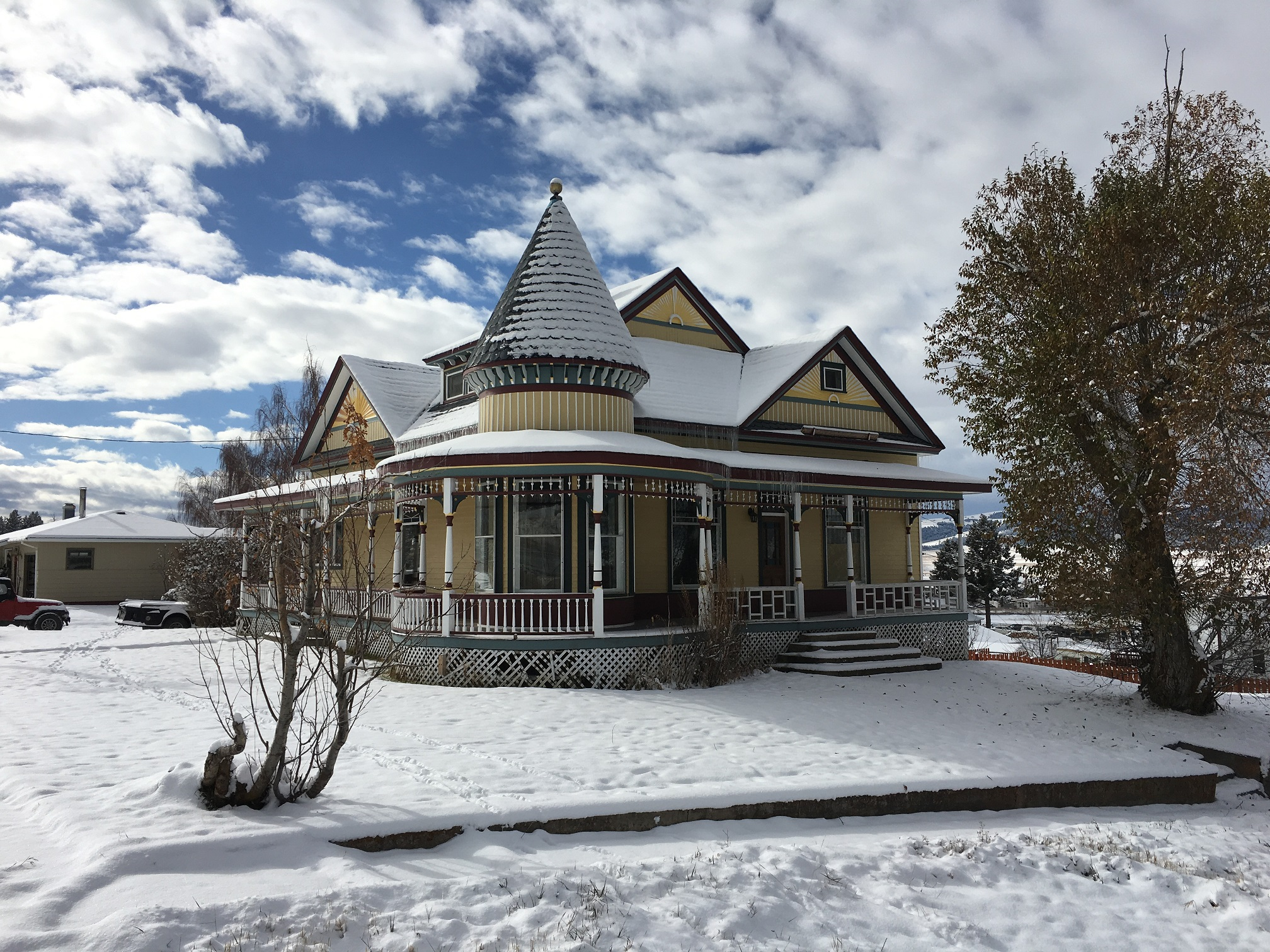

- Location within Montana Location within the United States
- Location: Dearborn and Montgomery Sts., Philipsburg, Montana
- Coordinates: 46°19′44″N 113°17′34″W
- Area: less than one acre
- Built: 1902
- Architectural style: Late Victorian
- MPS: Philipsburg Montana MRA
- NRHP reference No.: 86002788
- Added to NRHP: December 3, 1986

The M. E. Doe House, at Dearborn and Montgomery Streets in Philipsburg, Montana, was built in 1902. It was listed on the National Register of Historic Places in 1986.

It is a two-story wood-frame house. It features a one-story conical turret at its northeast corner and a porch which wraps around three sides of the house.

It was built for Marshall Doe, who operated a druggist business from 1885 for at least 20 years, and who bought land which became the Doe & Morse Addition.
