= 眉 =

眉 is a Chinese character in Chinese culture, may refer to:

- in the Mandarin for "eyebrows"
  - Sun Mei (孫眉), Chinese revolutionary statesman Sun Yat-sen's elder brother
- miz, in the Sawndip form for "to have"

== See also ==
- Eyebrow (disambiguation)
