= Anderson Lumber Company =

- U.S. National Register of Historic Places
- Location within Montana Location within the United States
- Location: Roughly bounded by Brown, First, and Holland Sts., Philipsburg, Montana
- Coordinates: 46°20′2″N 113°18′1″W
- Area: less than one acre
- Built by: Anderson, Charles
- MPS: Philipsburg Montana MRA
- NRHP reference No.: 86002790
- Added to NRHP: December 3, 1986

The Anderson Lumber Company property, roughly bounded by Brown, First, and Holland Streets in Philipsburg, Montana, was listed on the National Register of Historic Places in 1986.

The listing included five contributing buildings: a c.1880 house and four c.1895 buildings.

The house was home of Charles Anderson, who immigrated to the U.S. from Norway in 1875. He established a lumber and coal business in 1878 in Philipsburg. After his death in 1893, his brother Theodore took over.
