= Maxville, Montana =

- Census-designated place
- Location within Montana Location within the United States
- Coordinates: 46°28′33″N 113°14′08″W
- Country: United States
- State: Montana
- County: Granite

Area
  - Total: 6.98 sq mi (18.08 km^{2})
  - Land: 6.97 sq mi (18.06 km^{2})
  - Water: 0.0077 sq mi (0.02 km^{2})
- Elevation: 4,754 ft (1,449 m)

Population (2020)
  - Total: 138
  - Density: 19.8/sq mi (7.64/km^{2})
- Time zone: UTC-7 (Mountain (MST))
  - Summer (DST): UTC-6 (MDT)
- Area code: 406
- GNIS feature ID: 2583829

Maxville is a census-designated place in Granite County, Montana, United States. As of the 2020 census, Maxville had a population of 138. Montana Highway 1 passes through the community. It is 11 miles from Philipsburg.

== Geography ==
According to the U.S. Census Bureau, the community has an area of 6.924 square miles (17.93 km^{2}), of which 6.915 square miles (17.91 km^{2}) is land and 0.009 square miles (0.023 km^{2}) is water.

== Demographics ==
Historical population
Census	Pop.	Note	%±
2020	138		—
U.S. Decennial Census
