= The Eyebrow =

Mountain in Montana, United States

Coordinates: 46°31′57″N 113°16′09″W

The Eyebrow is a summit in Granite County, Montana, in the United States. With an elevation of 4,964 feet (1,513 m), The Eyebrow is the 2352nd highest summit in the state of Montana.
