= Quigley, Montana =

- Unincorporated Community
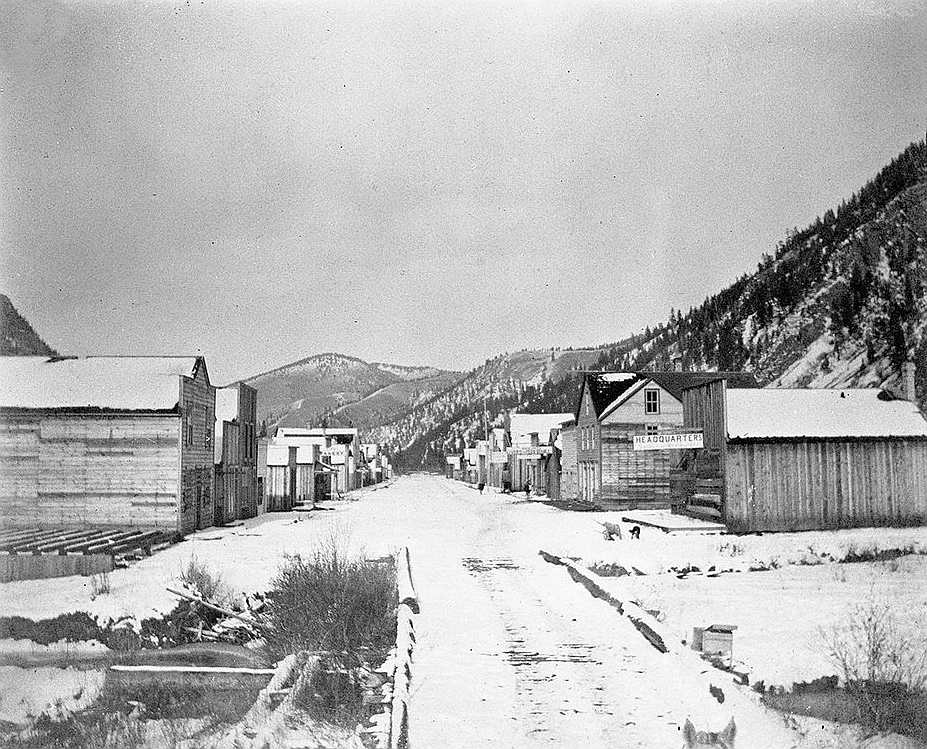
- Quigley, circa 1900

- Location within Montana
- Coordinates: 46°36′44″N 113°38′54″W
- Country: United States
- State: Montana
- County: Granite
- Elevation: 3,852 ft (1,174 m)
- GNIS feature ID: 789299

Quigley is an unincorporated community in Granite County, Montana, United States. It is located 25 miles (40 km) south-east of Missoula. The community is serviced by the post office in Clinton.
