= Granite County Jail =

- U.S. National Register of Historic Places
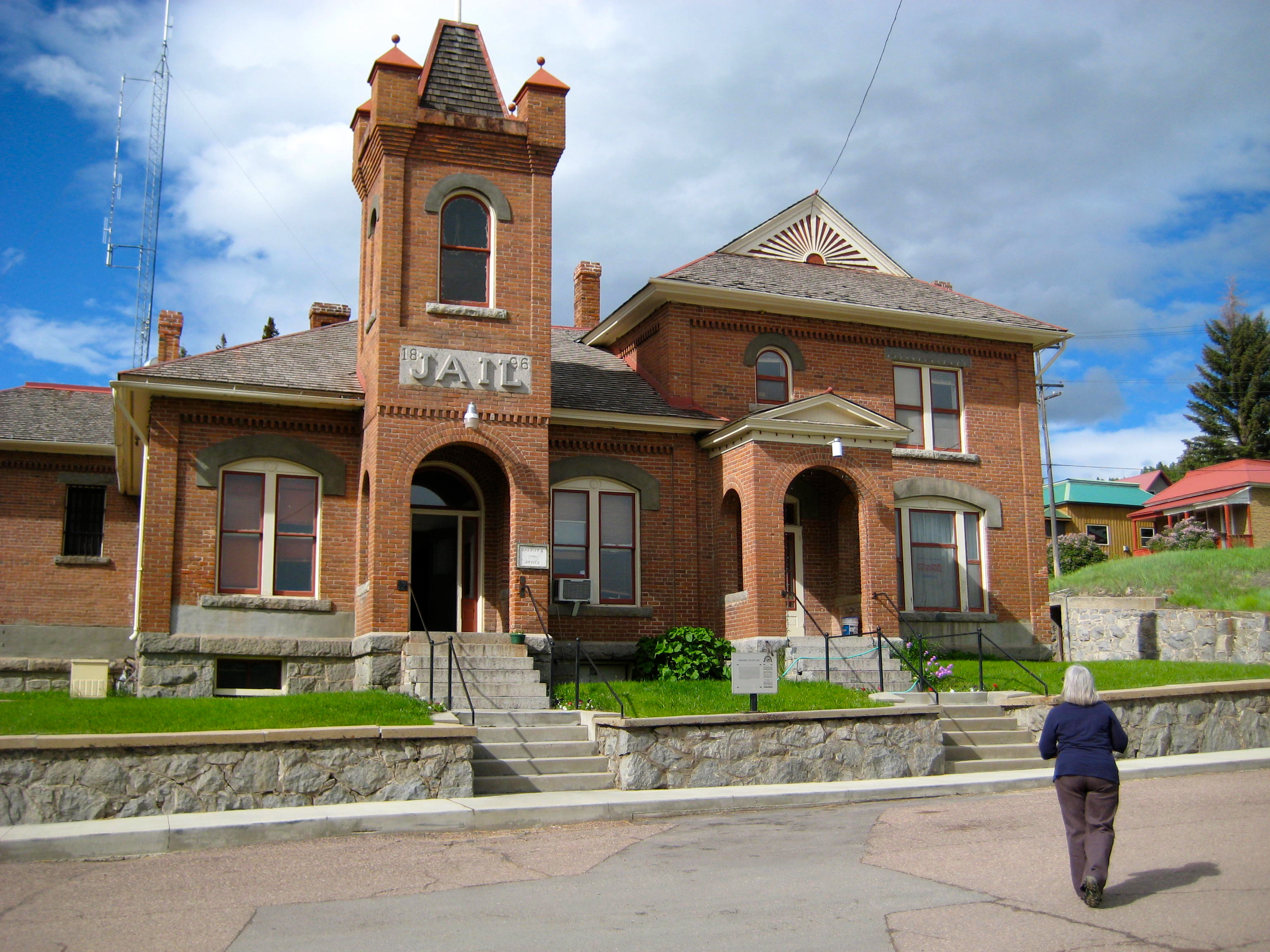

- Location within Montana Location within the United States
- Location: Kearney St., Philipsburg, Montana
- Coordinates: 46°20′2″N 113°17′31″W
- Area: less than one acre
- Built: 1896
- Built by: Andrews, F.
- Architectural style: Late Victorian, Vernacular Eclectic
- NRHP reference No.: 80002420
- Added to NRHP: August 27, 1980

The Granite County Jail, located on Kearney St. in Philipsburg in Granite County, Montana, was built in 1896. It was added to the National Register of Historic Places in 1980.

It is a red brick building which was still in use as a jail in 1980. It is two stories in one section, one story in another, and has a square tower about 45 feet (14 m) tall, with small projecting square turrets at its four corners, above the building's entry portico.
