= Quigley's =

Former junior department stores in Los Angeles County

Quigley's (also Quigley's Department Stores, Quigley's Variety Stores) was a chain of variety stores and junior department stores in Los Angeles County, California, from 1936-1990.

In 1936, Roger Bemis (R. B.) Quigley retired from his job at Woolworth's and opened the first Quigley's near the corner of Sunset and Fairfax. It was located north of what is today the border of West Hollywood. At the time, there was little competition from supermarkets for the types of products sold by variety stores (or "five and dimes"). Quigley's slogan was "Basic merchandise at a reasonable price."

In 1948, Quigley's was owned and operated by R. B. Quigley, J. H. (James Harold) Quigley, and W. S. Manning.

== Expansion ==
Stores were opened as follows:

City/neighborhood	Location	Opened	Notes	Source
Hollywood	7916 Sunset Bl. at Fairfax Av.		First listed in the phone directory in the 1930s	
Los Feliz	1815 N. Vermont Av.	by 1947		
Westchester	8816 S. Sepulveda Bl.	1953	The building was part of Bed Bath & Beyond through 2021.	
Burbank	1611 W. Verdugo Av. at Olive	1945	Staff of 20 in 1948, 8,500 sq ft (790 m^{2})	
Windsor Hills	4435 W. Slauson Av.			
Van Nuys	6711 Van Nuys Bl. at Vanowen	1948		
Long Beach	Plaza, 6428 E. Spring St.	1953		
Sherman Oaks	Chase Knolls, 13401 Riverside at Fulton	1955	18,000 sq ft (1,700 m^{2}). Closed in 1990.	
Lakewood	Carwood, 4240 Woodruff at Carson	Jun 7, 1956		
Belmont Shore	5026 E. Second St.	May 4, 1961	8th store upon opening, 4th store in Long Beach-Lakewood area	
Downey	Downey Shopping Center	After 1961		
Azusa	305 E. Gladstone	After 1961		

The last store, Sherman Oaks, closed in 1990; a location in Seal Beach, on Seal Beach Boulevard at the Seal Beach Leisure World retirement village, was in that year sold to that branch's manager and continued for a short time under the Quigley's name. Despite Quigley's calling itself a department store over the years, the Los Angeles Times put it squarely in the category of variety store. The newspaper reported that the staff prided itself on the slogan, "If you can’t find it any place else, Quigley’s has it."

Quigley's department store, in Belmont Shore and the Plaza, was mentioned by the readers of columnist Tim Grobaty, writing in the Long Beach Press-Telegram, as being among the places most missed in Long Beach.
