= Hall, Montana =

- Unincorporated community and Census designated place
- Location within Montana Location within the United States
- Coordinates: 46°35′12″N 113°11′49″W
- Country: United States
- State: Montana
- County: Granite

Area
  - Total: 0.17 sq mi (0.43 km^{2})
  - Land: 0.17 sq mi (0.43 km^{2})
  - Water: 0 sq mi (0.00 km^{2})
- Elevation: 4,206 ft (1,282 m)

Population (2020)
  - Total: 51
  - Density: 309.1/sq mi (119.35/km^{2})
- Time zone: UTC-7 (Mountain (MST))
  - Summer (DST): UTC-6 (MDT)
- ZIP code: 59837
- Area code: 406
- GNIS feature ID: 2804295

Hall is an unincorporated community in Granite County, Montana, United States. Hall is located on Montana Highway 1, 6.2 miles (10.0 km) west-southwest of Drummond. The community has a post office with ZIP code 59837. As of the 2020 census, Hall had a population of 51.

Originally called Hall's Crossing, the Northern Pacific Railroad constructed a branch line across this land in 1877.

== Demographics ==
Historical population
| Census | Pop. | Note | %± |
|---|---|---|---|
| 2020 | 51 | | — |
U.S. Decennial Census
