= Drummond, Montana =

- Town
- Drummond, November 2026

- Location of Drummond, Montana
- Coordinates: 46°40′00″N 113°08′49″W
- Country: United States
- State: Montana
- County: Granite

Area
  - Total: 0.54 sq mi (1.40 km^{2})
  - Land: 0.54 sq mi (1.40 km^{2})
  - Water: 0 sq mi (0.00 km^{2})
- Elevation: 3,954 ft (1,205 m)

Population (2020)
  - Total: 272
  - Density: 501.9/sq mi (193.78/km^{2})
- Time zone: UTC-7 (Mountain (MST))
  - Summer (DST): UTC-6 (MDT)
- ZIP code: 59832
- Area code: 406
- FIPS code: 30-21850
- GNIS feature ID: 2412449
- Website: townofdrummondmt.gov

Drummond is a town in Granite County, Montana, United States. The population was 272 at the 2020 census.

== Geography ==
Drummond can be accessed via exits 153 and 154 on Interstate 90. It is just north of the Clark Fork River.

According to the United States Census Bureau, the town has a total area of 0.53 square miles (1.37 km^{2}), all land.

== Climate ==
According to the Köppen Climate Classification system, Drummond has a semi-arid climate, abbreviated "BSk" on climate maps.

== History ==
The Northern Pacific Railroad arrived in 1883. They changed the town name from Edwardsville to Drummond, after either a Northern Pacific engineer or Hugh Drummond, a local trapper.

Mayor Gail Leeper is known for her long tenure. First elected to the office in 1993, Leeper won election to her 8th term in 2021.

== Demographics ==
Historical population
Census	Pop.	Note	%±
1950	531		—
1960	577		8.7%
1970	494		−14.4%
1980	414		−16.2%
1990	264		−36.2%
2000	318		20.5%
2010	309		−2.8%
2020	272		−12.0%
U.S. Decennial Census

=== 2010 census ===
As of the census of 2010, there were 309 people, 143 households, and 84 families residing in the town. The population density was 583.0 inhabitants per square mile (225.1/km^{2}). There were 179 housing units at an average density of 337.7 per square mile (130.4/km^{2}). The racial makeup of the town was 97.7% White (U.S. Census)], 0.3% African American, 0.3% Native American, and 1.6% from two or more races. Hispanic or Latino of any race were 1.6% of the population.

There were 143 households, of which 21.7% had children under the age of 18 living with them, 47.6% were married couples living together, 7.0% had a female householder with no husband present, 4.2% had a male householder with no wife present, and 41.3% were non-families. 38.5% of all households were made up of individuals, and 13.3% had someone living alone who was 65 years of age or older. The average household size was 2.11 and the average family size was 2.80.

The median age in the town was 46.9 years. 19.1% of residents were under the age of 18; 7.1% were between the ages of 18 and 24; 18.5% were from 25 to 44; 32% were from 45 to 64; and 23.3% were 65 years of age or older. The gender makeup of the town was 48.5% male and 51.5% female.

=== 2000 census ===
As of the census of 2000, there were 318 people, 140 households, and 84 families residing in the town. The population density was 547.8 inhabitants per square mile (211.5/km^{2}). There were 172 housing units at an average density of 296.3 per square mile (114.4/km^{2}). The racial makeup of the town was 96.54% White, 1.57% Native American, 0.31% from other races, and 1.57% from two or more races. Hispanic or Latino of any race were 0.94% of the population.

There were 140 households, out of which 30.7% had children under the age of 18 living with them, 45.0% were married couples living together, 11.4% had a female householder with no husband present, and 39.3% were non-families. 35.0% of all households were made up of individuals, and 9.3% had someone living alone who was 65 years of age or older. The average household size was 2.27 and the average family size was 2.93.

In the town, the population was spread out, with 28.6% under the age of 18, 5.3% from 18 to 24, 27.0% from 25 to 44, 25.8% from 45 to 64, and 13.2% who were 65 years of age or older. The median age was 38 years. For every 100 females there were 101.3 males. For every 100 females age 18 and over, there were 100.9 males.

The median income for a household in the town was $26,500, and the median income for a family was $32,841. Males had a median income of $30,625 versus $16,563 for females. The per capita income for the town was $14,213. About 6.6% of families and 13.6% of the population were below the poverty line, including 15.0% of those under age 18 and 5.0% of those age 65 or over.

== Arts and culture ==
During the summer a farmer's market is set up weekly along Front Street. In May the Austen Martell Memorial Mud Bog & Tough Trucks event raises money for suicide awareness. The Drummond PRCA Rodeo is held every July. The 2025 event was the 84th year of the rodeo.

Drummond has two parks. The Drummond City Park allows camping.

The Drummond School and Community Library serves the town.

== Government ==
Drummond has a town council and a mayor. There are four members on the council. Gail Leeper ran unopposed for mayor in 2025.

== Education ==
Drummond Public Schools provides education. Drummond High School's team name is the Trojans.

== See also ==
- List of cities and towns in Montana
- Atlantic Cable Quartz Lode
