= Granite County, Montana =

County in Montana, United States

- County
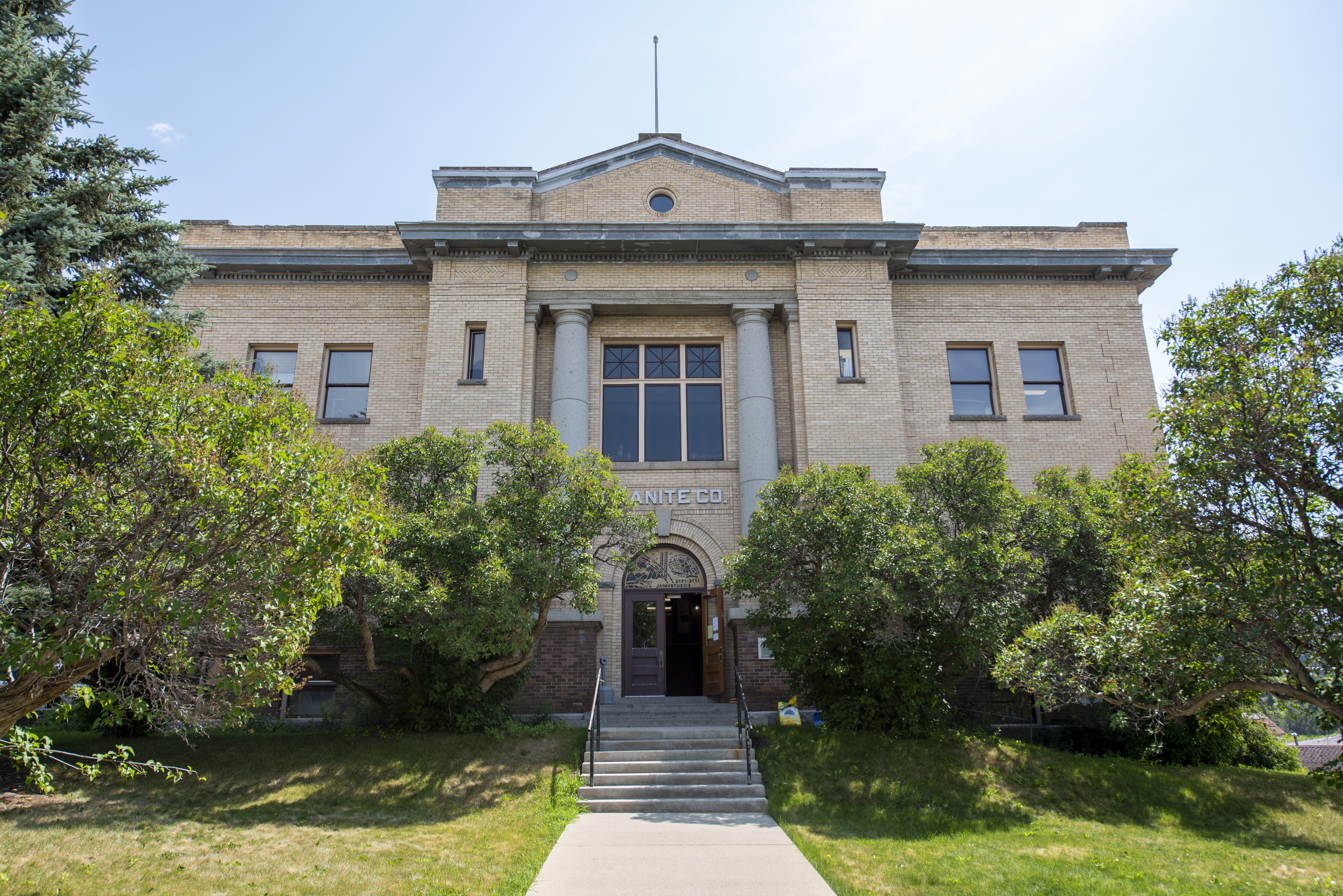
- Granite County Courthouse

- Location within the U.S. state of Montana
- Coordinates: 46°25′N 113°27′W
- Country: United States
- State: Montana
- Founded: March 2, 1893
- Seat: Philipsburg
- Largest town: Philipsburg

Area
  - Total: 1,733 sq mi (4,490 km^{2})
  - Land: 1,727 sq mi (4,470 km^{2})
  - Water: 5.6 sq mi (15 km^{2}) 0.3%

Population (2020)
  - Total: 3,309
  - Estimate (2025): 3,658 ▲
  - Density: 1.916/sq mi (0.7398/km^{2})
- Time zone: UTC−7 (Mountain)
  - Summer (DST): UTC−6 (MDT)
- Congressional district: 1st
- Website: www.granitecountymt.gov
- Montana county number 46

Granite County is a county located in the U.S. state of Montana. As of the 2020 census, the population was 3,309. Its county seat is Philipsburg. The county was founded in 1893, and was named for a mountain which contains the Granite Mountain silver mine.

== Geography ==
According to the United States Census Bureau, the county has a total area of 1,733 square miles (4,490 km^{2}), of which 1,727 square miles (4,470 km^{2}) is land and 5.6 square miles (15 km^{2}) (0.3%) is water.

=== Major highways ===
- Interstate 90
- U.S. Highway 10 (Former)
- U.S. Highway 12
- Montana Highway 1
- Montana Highway 38

=== Adjacent counties ===
- Missoula County - north
- Powell County - east
- Deer Lodge County - south
- Ravalli County - west

=== National protected areas ===
- Deerlodge National Forest (part)
- Lolo National Forest (part)

== Politics ==
United States presidential election results for Granite County, Montana
Year	Republican		Democratic		Third party(ies)	
Year	No.	%	No.	%	No.	%
1904	576	49.40%	521	44.68%	69	5.92%
1908	369	40.46%	485	53.18%	58	6.36%
1912	195	21.93%	346	38.92%	348	39.15%
1916	574	38.81%	812	54.90%	93	6.29%
1920	949	64.21%	439	29.70%	90	6.09%
1924	582	43.47%	353	26.36%	404	30.17%
1928	849	62.15%	509	37.26%	8	0.59%
1932	536	37.25%	855	59.42%	48	3.34%
1936	475	27.55%	1,227	71.17%	22	1.28%
1940	784	45.85%	917	53.63%	9	0.53%
1944	702	54.50%	574	44.57%	12	0.93%
1948	659	51.97%	567	44.72%	42	3.31%
1952	923	65.88%	473	33.76%	5	0.36%
1956	896	62.70%	533	37.30%	0	0.00%
1960	722	54.57%	592	44.75%	9	0.68%
1964	527	44.40%	658	55.43%	2	0.17%
1968	626	49.56%	502	39.75%	135	10.69%
1972	804	62.28%	422	32.69%	65	5.03%
1976	746	58.65%	509	40.02%	17	1.34%
1980	811	59.15%	439	32.02%	121	8.83%
1984	880	66.57%	417	31.54%	25	1.89%
1988	789	59.50%	511	38.54%	26	1.96%
1992	556	42.06%	358	27.08%	408	30.86%
1996	733	52.10%	429	30.49%	245	17.41%
2000	1,181	74.28%	295	18.55%	114	7.17%
2004	1,144	71.28%	404	25.17%	57	3.55%
2008	1,013	58.96%	601	34.98%	104	6.05%
2012	1,107	64.93%	533	31.26%	65	3.81%
2016	1,192	67.08%	472	26.56%	113	6.36%
2020	1,419	67.51%	638	30.35%	45	2.14%
2024	1,537	70.63%	579	26.61%	60	2.76%

== Demographics ==
Historical population
Census	Pop.	Note	%±
1900	4,328		—
1910	2,942		−32.0%
1920	4,167		41.6%
1930	3,013		−27.7%
1940	3,401		12.9%
1950	2,773		−18.5%
1960	3,014		8.7%
1970	2,737		−9.2%
1980	2,700		−1.4%
1990	2,548		−5.6%
2000	2,830		11.1%
2010	3,079		8.8%
2020	3,309		7.5%
2025 (est.)	3,658	▲	10.5%
U.S. Decennial Census; 1790–1960, 1900–1990, 1990–2000, 2010–2020

=== 2020 census ===
As of the 2020 census, the county had a population of 3,309. Of the residents, 18.2% were under the age of 18 and 29.2% were 65 years of age or older; the median age was 52.6 years. For every 100 females there were 111.6 males, and for every 100 females age 18 and over there were 110.4 males. 0.0% of residents lived in urban areas and 100.0% lived in rural areas.

The racial makeup of the county was 93.4% White, 0.0% Black or African American, 0.9% American Indian and Alaska Native, 0.2% Asian, 0.9% from some other race, and 4.5% from two or more races. Hispanic or Latino residents of any race comprised 2.6% of the population.

There were 1,504 households in the county, of which 17.8% had children under the age of 18 living with them and 19.1% had a female householder with no spouse or partner present. About 33.6% of all households were made up of individuals and 14.9% had someone living alone who was 65 years of age or older.

There were 2,601 housing units, of which 42.2% were vacant. Among occupied housing units, 76.9% were owner-occupied and 23.1% were renter-occupied. The homeowner vacancy rate was 0.7% and the rental vacancy rate was 6.2%.

=== 2010 census ===
As of the 2010 census, there were 3,079 people, 1,417 households, and 911 families living in the county. The population density was 1.8 inhabitants per square mile (0.69/km^{2}). There were 2,822 housing units at an average density of 1.6 per square mile (0.62/km^{2}). The racial makeup of the county was 97.5% white, 0.4% American Indian, 0.1% black or African American, 0.1% Asian, 0.2% from other races, and 1.7% from two or more races. Those of Hispanic or Latino origin made up 1.4% of the population. In terms of ancestry, 26.2% were German, 20.2% were Irish, 18.8% were English, 13.5% were Norwegian, and 7.9% were American.

Of the 1,417 households, 19.6% had children under the age of 18 living with them, 55.3% were married couples living together, 5.7% had a female householder with no husband present, 35.7% were non-families, and 29.5% of all households were made up of individuals. The average household size was 2.14 and the average family size was 2.63. The median age was 52.1 years.

The median income for a household in the county was $36,052 and the median income for a family was $47,685. Males had a median income of $41,307 versus $23,958 for females. The per capita income for the county was $23,222. About 7.5% of families and 12.1% of the population were below the poverty line, including 5.4% of those under age 18 and 13.3% of those age 65 or over.

== Communities ==
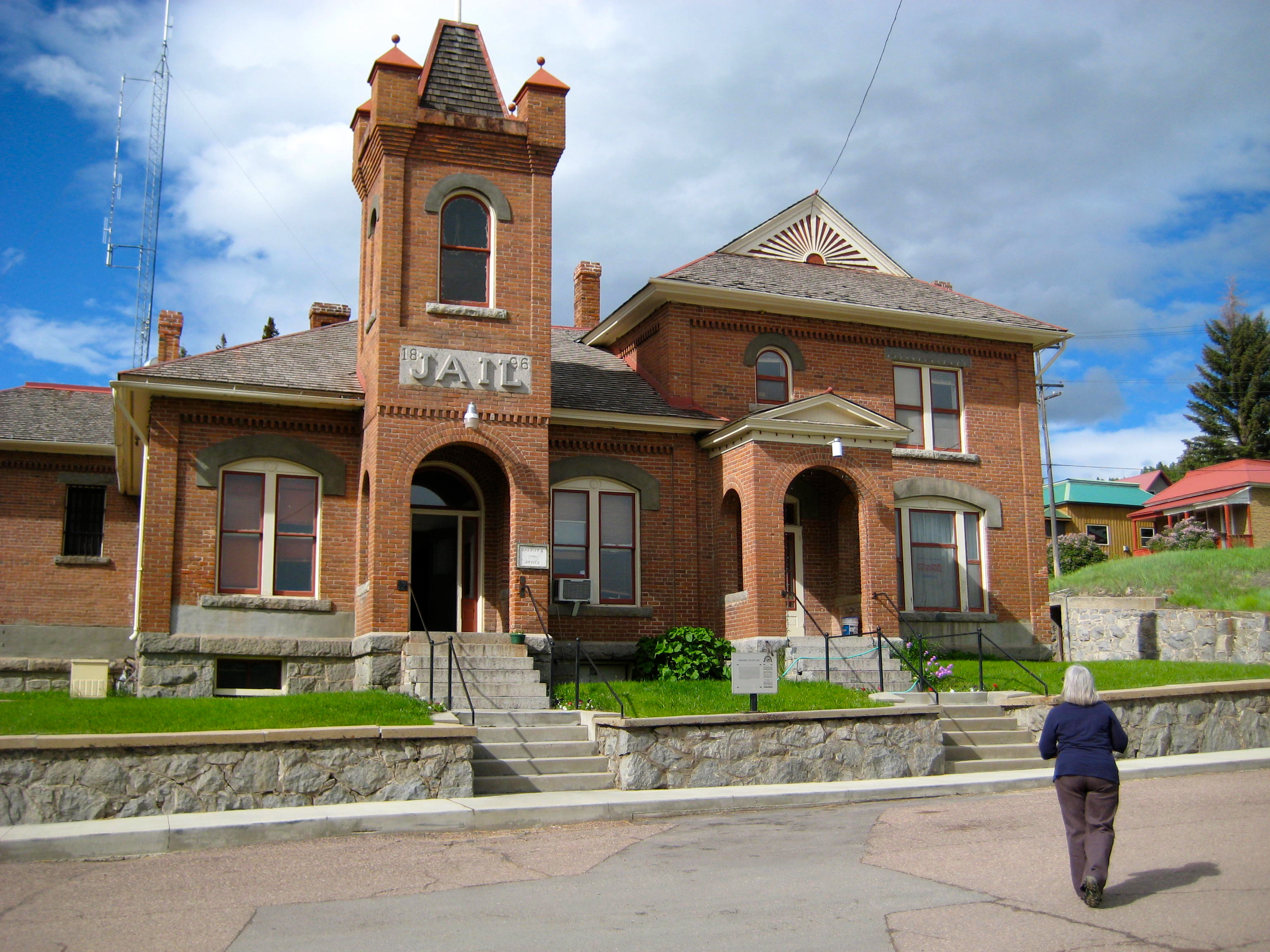
The Historic Granite County Jail in Philipsburg, Montana.

=== Towns ===
- Drummond
- Philipsburg (county seat)

=== Census-designated places ===
- Hall
- Maxville

=== Unincorporated communities ===
- Beartown
- New Chicago
- Quigley
- Princeton
- Sherryl
- Stone

=== Ghost towns ===
- Bearmouth
- Garnet
- Granite
- Nimrod

== See also ==
- List of lakes in Granite County, Montana
- List of mountains in Granite County, Montana
- National Register of Historic Places listings in Granite County, Montana
