= Philipsburg, Montana =

- Town
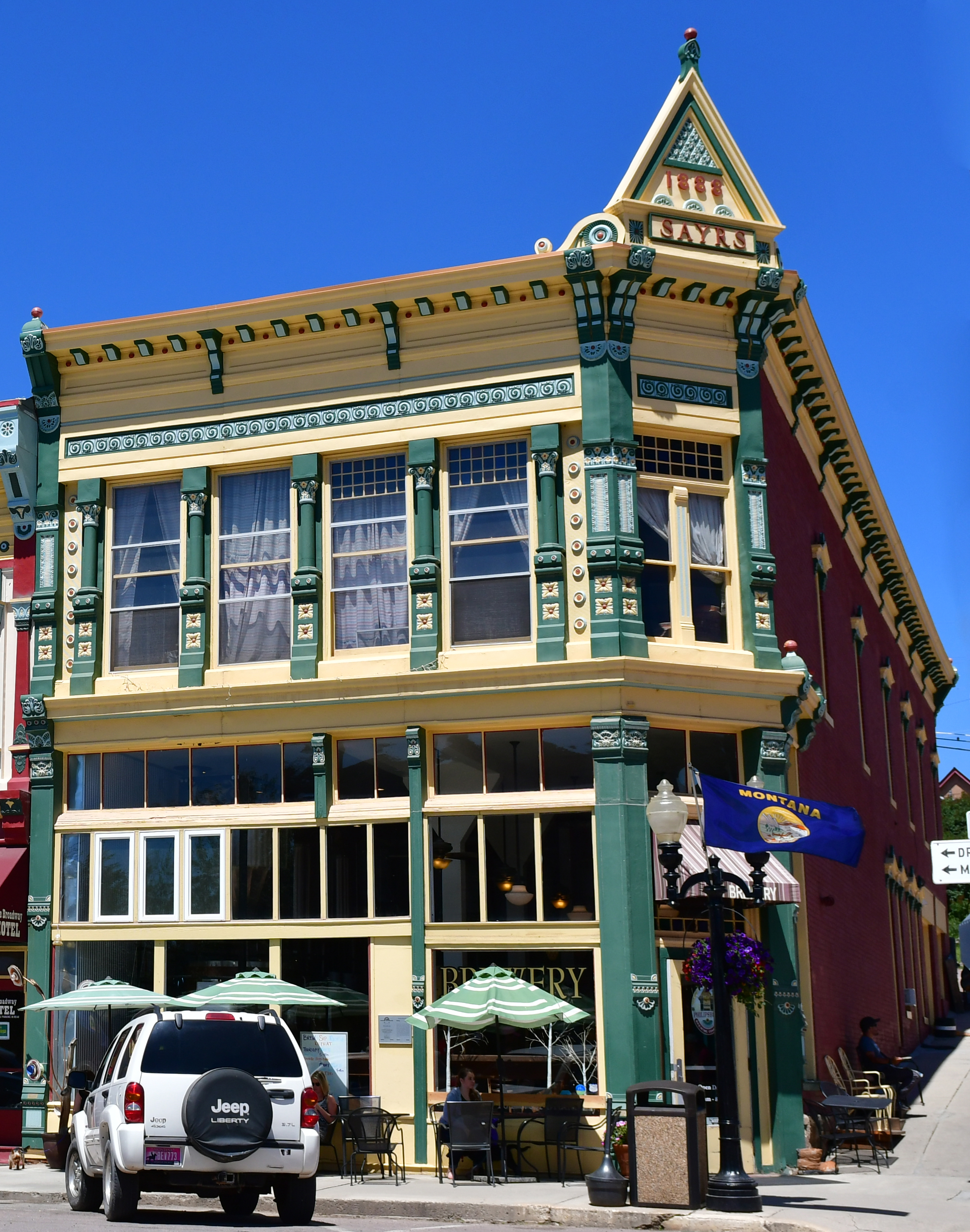
- Sayrs Building (1888), Broadway. 2018 photo

- Location of Philipsburg, Montana
- Coordinates: 46°19′57″N 113°17′46″W
- Country: United States
- State: Montana
- County: Granite

Area
  - Total: 0.85 sq mi (2.20 km^{2})
  - Land: 0.85 sq mi (2.20 km^{2})
  - Water: 0 sq mi (0.00 km^{2})
- Elevation: 5,233 ft (1,595 m)

Population (2020)
  - Total: 841
  - Density: 988.9/sq mi (381.81/km^{2})
- Time zone: UTC-7 (Mountain (MST))
  - Summer (DST): UTC-6 (MDT)
- ZIP code: 59858
- Area code: 406
- FIPS code: 30-57175
- GNIS feature ID: 2413127
- Website: www.townofphilipsburgmt.com

Philipsburg is a town in and the county seat of Granite County, Montana, United States. The population was 841 at the 2020 census. The town was named after the famous mining engineer Philip Deidesheimer, who designed and supervised the construction of the ore smelter around which the town originally formed. He platted the townsite in 1867.

== Geography ==
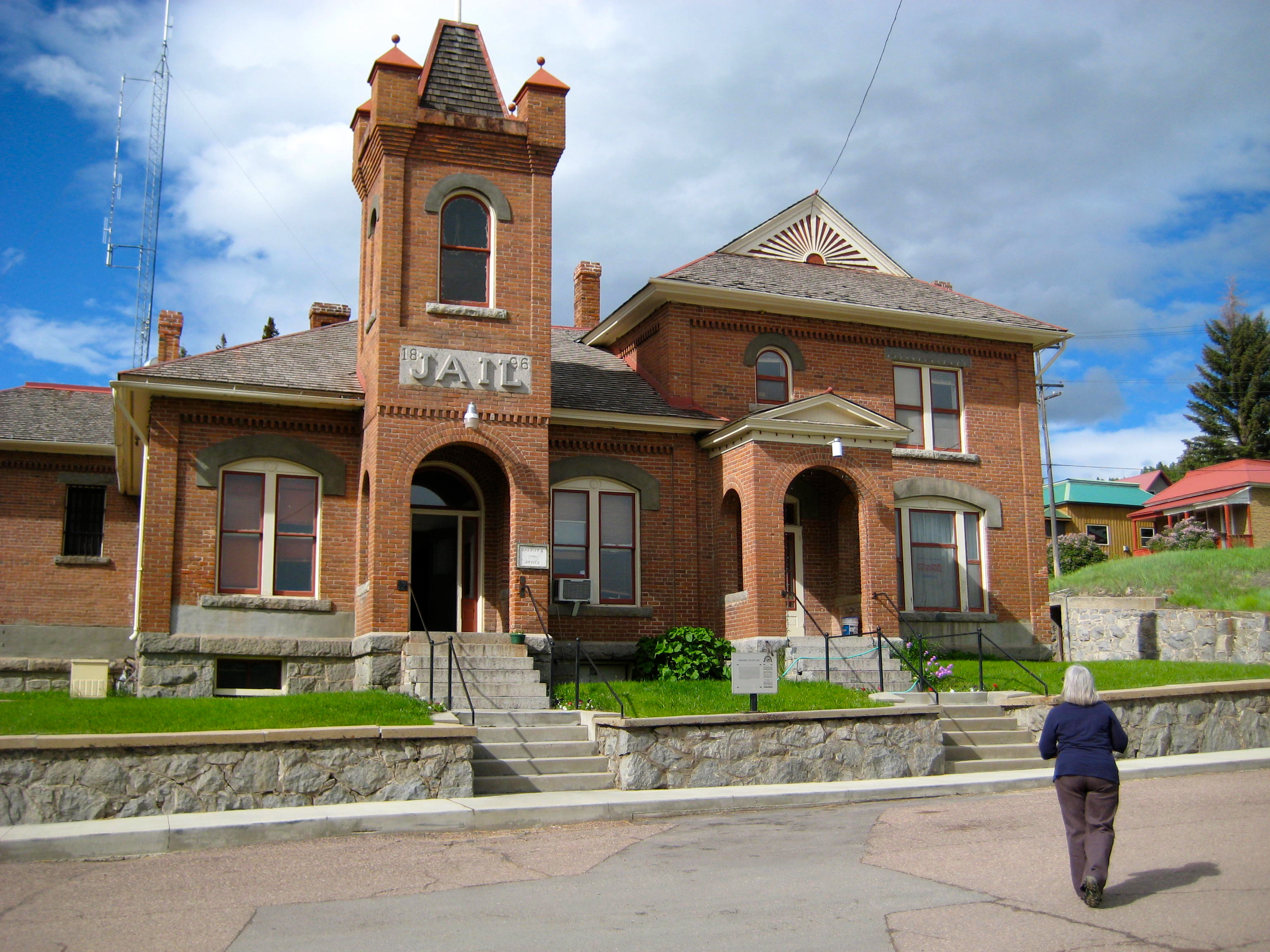
Granite County Jail (1896) in Philipsburg

Montana Highway 1 passes through town. Granite Ghost Town State Park is nearby.

According to the United States Census Bureau, the town has a total area of 0.80 square miles (2.07 km^{2}), all land.

== Demographics ==
Historical population
Census	Pop.	Note	%±
1880	299		—
1890	1,058		253.8%
1900	995		−6.0%
1910	1,109		11.5%
1920	1,724		55.5%
1930	1,300		−24.6%
1940	1,304		0.3%
1950	1,048		−19.6%
1960	1,107		5.6%
1970	1,128		1.9%
1980	1,138		0.9%
1990	925		−18.7%
2000	914		−1.2%
2010	820		−10.3%
2020	841		2.6%
U.S. Decennial Census

=== 2010 census ===
As of the census of 2010, there were 820 people, 413 households, and 217 families residing in the town. The population density was 1,025.0 inhabitants per square mile (395.8/km^{2}). There were 547 housing units at an average density of 683.8 per square mile (264.0/km^{2}). The racial makeup of the town was 96.8% White, 0.1% African American, 0.9% Native American, 0.2% Asian, 0.4% from other races, and 1.6% from two or more races. Hispanic or Latino of any race were 1.8% of the population.

There were 413 households, of which 16.0% had children under the age of 18 living with them, 40.0% were married couples living together, 8.5% had a female householder with no husband present, 4.1% had a male householder with no wife present, and 47.5% were non-families. 40.0% of all households were made up of individuals, and 17.9% had someone living alone who was 65 years of age or older. The average household size was 1.92 and the average family size was 2.53.

The median age in the town was 54.4 years. 14.8% of residents were under the age of 18; 4.4% were between the ages of 18 and 24; 17.2% were from 25 to 44; 34.2% were from 45 to 64; and 29.4% were 65 years of age or older. The gender makeup of the town was 49.1% male and 50.9% female.

== Economy ==
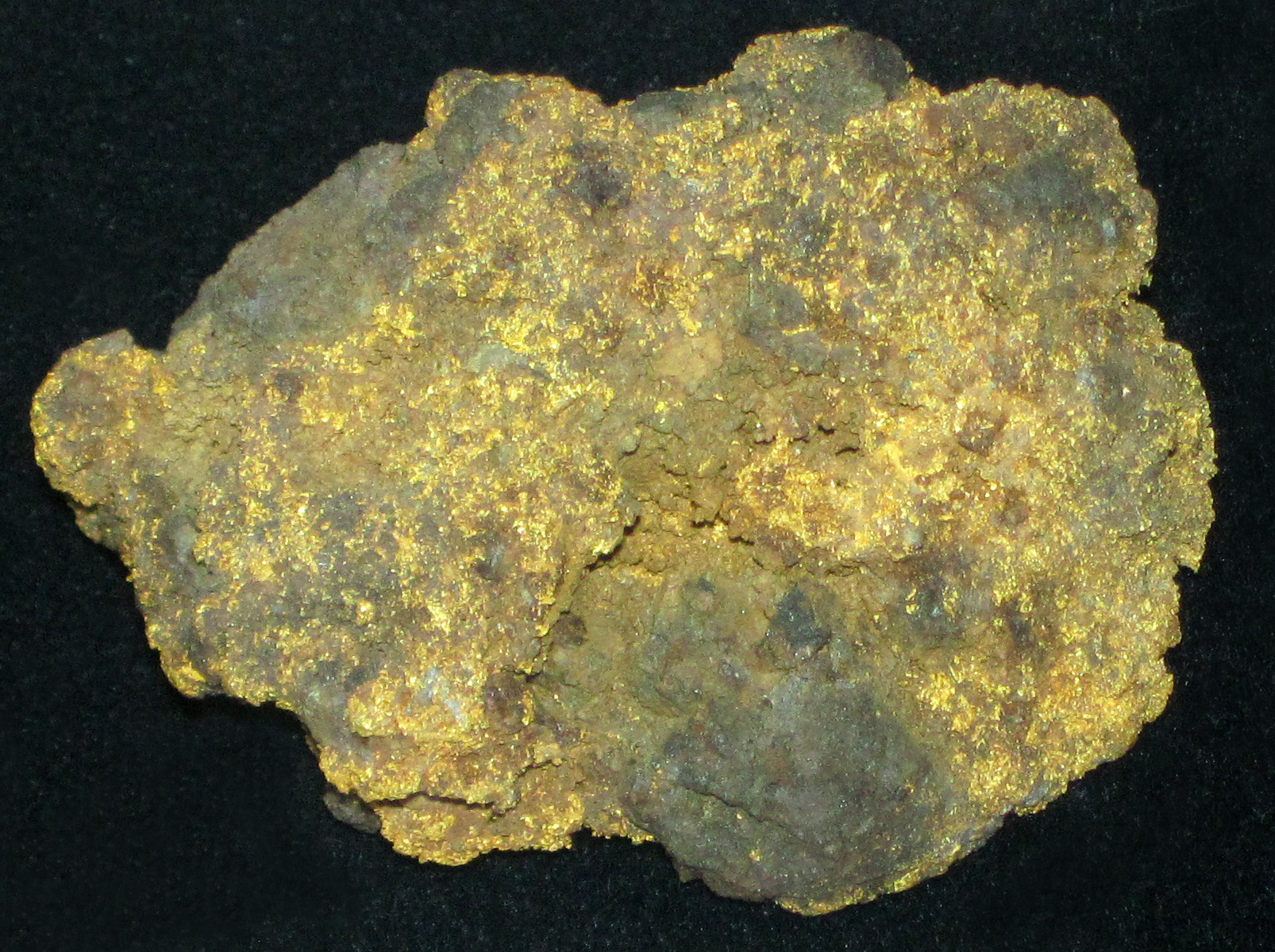
High-grade Gold ore, Gold Coin Mine, Philipsburg, Montana

Since the closure of local mines and sawmills in the 1980s the town's future was uncertain. The surrounding county is home to more than 24 ghost towns of former mining and timber towns. However the 1990s saw a wave of newcomers purchasing and restoring the numerous buildings in the town's historic district with the addition of sapphire hunting companies, art galleries, candy and jewelry stores.

In 2003 the historic Broadway Hotel was reopened by filmmaker Jim Jenner and numerous other lodging operations followed. Jenner's award-winning 2017 film, "Saving the Burg" captured the story of the town's rebirth and aired on PBS.

Major industries in Philipsburg are Accommodation and Food Service, Educational Services, Healthcare and Social Assistance. The main job fields are Service, Management, Business, Science and Arts, Sales and Office.

The Ranch at Rock Creek is Granite County's largest private employer. It is a luxury ranch, opened in 2007 and located 15 minutes from town, for celebrities and the well-to-do.

Other major employers are Discovery Basin Ski Area, Granite County Medical Center and Rest Home and the Philipsburg School District.

Philipsburg Brewing Company opened 2012 in the historical Sayrs Building, and expanded in 2015 to the historic Silver Springs Brewery on the eastern edge of town. The brewery sells bottled and keg beer throughout Montana and recently expanded to sell drinking water in recyclable aluminum bottles. The environmentally friendly packaging has led to contracts to provide bottled water to both Yellowstone and Glacier National Park concessionaires.

Project Vote Smart was located approximately 25 miles from Philipsburg for 16 years. It annually attracted interns to work on its elected official database and many of the organization's employees lived in Philipsburg. After the 2016 presidential election, Vote Smart relocated to Des Moines, Iowa.

== Climate ==
Philipsburg's climate transitions between semi-arid (Köppen BSk) and humid continental (Köppen Dfb). Winters are long and dry, but relatively mild, while summers are warm and distinctly wetter.

Climate data for Philipsburg, Montana (Philipsburg Ranger Station) (1991–2020 normals, extremes 1955–present)
Month	Jan	Feb	Mar	Apr	May	Jun	Jul	Aug	Sep	Oct	Nov	Dec	Year
Record high °F (°C)	64 (18)	64 (18)	72 (22)	80 (27)	90 (32)	96 (36)	98 (37)	98 (37)	95 (35)	86 (30)	73 (23)	63 (17)	98 (37)
Mean daily maximum °F (°C)	35.7 (2.1)	37.5 (3.1)	46.6 (8.1)	53.8 (12.1)	63.3 (17.4)	70.9 (21.6)	80.8 (27.1)	80.8 (27.1)	71.2 (21.8)	57.1 (13.9)	43.1 (6.2)	34.3 (1.3)	56.3 (13.5)
Daily mean °F (°C)	25.4 (−3.7)	26.2 (−3.2)	33.8 (1.0)	39.9 (4.4)	48.1 (8.9)	55.2 (12.9)	62.1 (16.7)	61.2 (16.2)	53.4 (11.9)	42.6 (5.9)	31.8 (−0.1)	24.3 (−4.3)	42.0 (5.6)
Mean daily minimum °F (°C)	15.2 (−9.3)	14.8 (−9.6)	21.1 (−6.1)	26.0 (−3.3)	32.9 (0.5)	39.5 (4.2)	43.4 (6.3)	41.6 (5.3)	35.5 (1.9)	28.0 (−2.2)	20.5 (−6.4)	14.3 (−9.8)	27.7 (−2.4)
Record low °F (°C)	−37 (−38)	−38 (−39)	−25 (−32)	−1 (−18)	8 (−13)	21 (−6)	25 (−4)	19 (−7)	5 (−15)	−9 (−23)	−31 (−35)	−38 (−39)	−38 (−39)
Average precipitation inches (mm)	0.67 (17)	0.85 (22)	1.10 (28)	1.62 (41)	2.64 (67)	2.49 (63)	1.22 (31)	1.13 (29)	1.44 (37)	1.42 (36)	1.15 (29)	0.76 (19)	16.49 (419)
Source: NOAA

== Arts and culture ==
Granite County Museum is located in the historic Courtney Hotel. In addition to exhibits on early town history, the museum features the Ghost Town Hall of Fame and the Granite Mountain Mining exhibit.

Philipsburg Public Library serves the area.

Discovery Ski Area is nearby and Georgetown Lake is 10 miles away giving outdoor recreation year round.

== Government ==
Philipsburg has a mayor and town council. There are six council members. Anne Fillmore won the 2025 election for mayor. She replaced Daniel Reddish who did not run for re-election.

== Education ==
Philipsburg Public Schools educates students from kindergarten through 12th grade. Granite High School's team name is the Prospectors.

== Media ==
• Philipsburg Mail - weekly newspaper

== Infrastructure ==
Riddick Field is a public use airport located 1 mile south of town.

== Cultural references ==
Philipsburg is notable for being the setting and subject of the poem "Degrees of Gray in Philipsburg" by celebrated Northwest poet Richard Hugo.

Actress Kate Bosworth married American director Michael Polish in Philipsburg on August 31, 2013. Actress Scarlett Johansson married boyfriend French journalist Romain Dauriac in Philipsburg on October 1, 2014. Kate Bosworth and Scarlett Johansson appeared together in the 1998 film The Horse Whisperer, much of which was shot in Montana.

Philipsburg won the 2015 Sunset Magazine Award for "Best Municipal Makeover," beating out entrants that included Reno, Nevada and Sacramento, California.
