= Missoula metropolitan area =

Missoula metropolitan area Nłʔay (Kalispel-Pend d'Oreille) Tuhuⱡnana (Ktunaxa)
- Metropolitan statistical area
- Missoula, MT Metropolitan Statistical Area
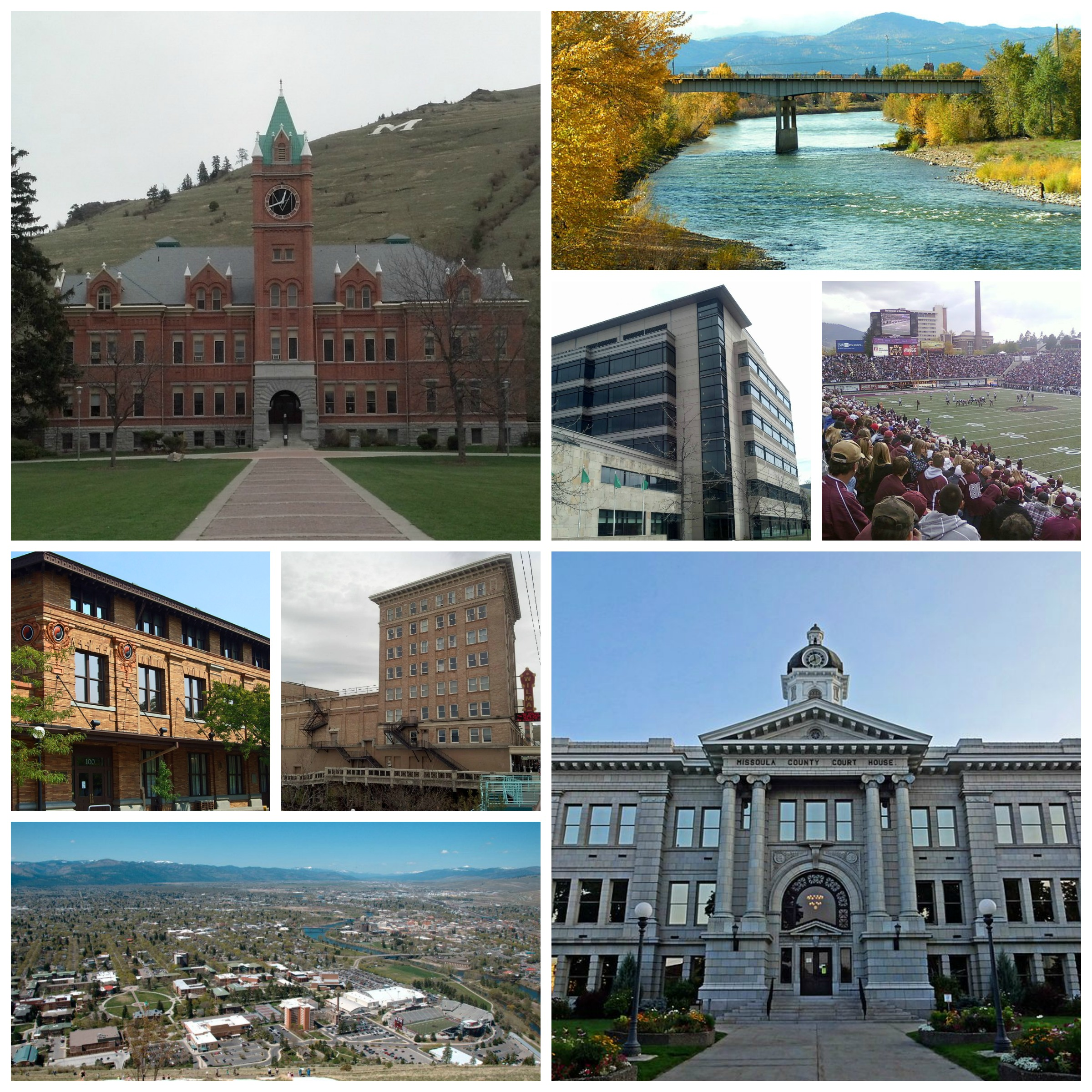
- Missoula and Surrounding Area
Interactive Map of Missoula, MT MSA
City of Missoula
Missoula, MT MSA
- Country: United States
- State: Montana
- Largest city: Missoula
- Other cities: Alberton, Superior

Area
  - Total: 3,812.759 sq mi (9,875.00 km^{2})

Population (2020)
  - Total: 122,457
  - Estimate (2024): 127,741 ▲
  - Rank: 320th in the U.S.
  - Density: 33.51/sq mi (12.939/km^{2})
- Time zone: UTC–7 (Mountain (MST))
  - Summer (DST): UTC–6 (MDT)
- Area codes: 406

The Missoula Metropolitan Statistical Area, as defined by the Census Bureau as comprising all of Missoula and Mineral Counties in Montana, anchored by the city of Missoula. As of the 2020 census, the population was 122,457 and was estimated to be 127,741 in 2024.

== Counties ==
- Mineral (5,195)
- Missoula (122,546)

== Communities ==
=== Incorporated Places ===
- Missoula (78,204)
- Superior (940)
- Alberton (545)

=== Census-designated places ===
- Orchard Homes (5,377)
- Lolo (4,399)
- East Missoula (2,465)
- Frenchtown (1,958)
- Bonner-West Riverside (1,690)
- Seeley Lake (1,682)
- Clinton (1,018)
- Carlton (721)
- Wye (714)
- Riverbend (455)
- Evaro (373)
- Piltzville (372)
- Turah (364)
- St. Regis (313)
- Condon (285)
- Huson (256)
- Twin Creeks (164)
- De Borgia (91)
- Cyr (63)
- Haugan (58)
- Potomac (26)
- Saltese (10)

=== Unincorporated Places ===
- East Portal
- Lolo Hot Springs
- Lothrop
- Milltown
- Tarkio

=== Ghost town ===
- Coloma
- Hell Gate
- Taft

== Demographics ==
Historical population
| Census | Pop. | Note | %± |
|---|---|---|---|
| 1870 | 2,554 | | — |
| 1880 | 2,537 | | −0.7% |
| 1890 | 14,427 | | 468.7% |
| 1900 | 13,964 | | −3.2% |
| 1910 | 23,596 | | 69.0% |
| 1920 | 26,368 | | 11.7% |
| 1930 | 23,408 | | −11.2% |
| 1940 | 31,173 | | 33.2% |
| 1950 | 37,574 | | 20.5% |
| 1960 | 47,700 | | 26.9% |
| 1970 | 61,221 | | 28.3% |
| 1980 | 79,691 | | 30.2% |
| 1990 | 82,002 | | 2.9% |
| 2000 | 99,686 | | 21.6% |
| 2010 | 113,649 | | 14.0% |
| 2020 | 122,457 | | 7.8% |
| 2024 (est.) | 127,741 | | 4.3% |
U.S. Decennial Census; 1790–1960 1900–1990; 1990–2000 2010–2020

=== 2020 census ===
As of the 2020 census, there were 122,457 people, 52,685 households, and 29,685 families residing in the MSA. The population density was 32.12 inhabitants per square mile (12.4/km^{2}). There were 57,105 housing units at an average density of 14.98 per square mile (5.8/km^{2}). The racial makeup of the MSA was 86.26% White, 0.62% African American, 2.75% Native American, 1.21% Asian, 0.11% Pacific Islander, 2.18% from some other races and 6.87% from two or more races. Hispanic or Latino people of any race were 5.02% of the population.

== See also ==
- Metropolitan statistical area
- Montana statistical areas
