= Wayne Nance =

American serial killer (1955–1986)

- Nance with victim Bachmann
- Born: Wayne Nathan Nance; October 18, 1955; Clinton, Montana, U.S.
- Died: September 4, 1986 (aged 30); Missoula, Montana, U.S.
- Cause of death: Gunshot wound to the chest
- Other name: The Missoula Mauler

Details
- Victims: 6+
- Span of crimes: 1974–1986
- Country: United States
- State: Montana

Wayne Nathan Nance (October 18, 1955 – September 4, 1986), known as The Missoula Mauler, was an American serial killer in the state of Montana. Nance was shot and killed while committing a home invasion of a co-worker's residence; thus, Nance was never formally charged, tried, or convicted of any murder. Authorities reported that physical evidence linked Nance to several unsolved murders.

Law enforcement believe Nance committed at least six homicides although it is strongly suspected that he may have had many more undiscovered victims. Before Nance's death and the discovery of his crimes, some of the murders were tentatively ascribed to David Meirhofer. A native Montanan and military veteran, Meirhofer confessed to four murders and then killed himself in custody in 1974.

== Life and criminal history ==
=== Early life ===
Wayne Nance was born on October 18, 1955, in Clinton, Montana, to George Edwin Nance (August 20, 1928 – April 4, 2004), a long-haul truck driver, and Charlene Mae Mackie (February 2, 1936 – April 3, 1980), a waitress. Nance lived in a motor home outside of Milltown, Montana, which is east of Missoula and was described by teachers and classmates as an academically gifted yet eccentric individual who was also a juvenile delinquent. Friends claimed that during his adolescence, Nance frequently boasted of worshipping the devil, and had even used a hot coat hanger to brand himself with Satanic symbols. He also had bragged about wanting to commit a murder before he was 19 years old. Nance graduated from Sentinel High School in 1974.

=== 1970s ===
Nance is believed to have raped and murdered a 39-year-old woman named Donna Lorraine Pounds on April 11, 1974, in West Riverside, Montana. Pounds, who worked part-time at a Christian bookstore, had arrived home at 3:30 p.m., and is believed to have encountered Nance in the master bedroom. He was armed with her husband's .22 caliber Luger rifle, with which he fired a warning shot at the bedroom wall. Nance was wearing latex gloves, one of which was found at the scene and carried with him a black gym bag, from which he produced a white clothesline, which was used to tie Pounds to her bed.

Nance then raped her before forcing her downstairs into the basement, where, at point-blank range, he shot her five times in the back of her head. He then inserted the barrel of the gun into her vagina and left the property. Donna's husband, Harvey, arrived home at 6 p.m. and discovered that Pounds had been held captive in her basement, tied to a chair, and shot. Three eyewitnesses claimed they saw Nance, an acquaintance of the victim's teenage son, in the area about the time of Pounds' death that afternoon. One witness claimed they saw him in the garden of the Pounds residence and another said they saw him leaving the house with a black gym bag and heading in the direction of the Tamarack Trailer Park, where Nance lived with his parents. The Pounds' son had also shown Nance where his father had kept his gun and Nance was a regular at the house.

When questioned by police, Nance admitted that he had not gone to school that day, but had stayed home, in order to work on a school project. He had been out in the area, he said, foraging for the materials that he needed. Insufficient evidence prevented Nance from being charged with her murder. Years later, police searched Nance's home and discovered evidence linking him to the Pounds murder. Nance served in the United States Navy from 1974 to 1977, and investigators later suspected he might have committed more crimes while traveling for his military service. On November 29, 1977, Nance received a general military discharge on the grounds of misconduct after he was found with stolen items, LSD, marijuana and illegal butterfly knives.

=== 1980s ===
After his discharge from military service, Nance visited Seattle, Washington, in July 1978, where 15-year-old runaway Devonna Louise Nelson went missing. On February 27, 1980, her badly decomposed body was discovered by the crew of a slow-moving freight train on a road bank close to Interstate 90 in the city of Missoula resting against a chain-link fence. Because of the condition of the body, her remains were not identified until February 16, 1985. She had no shoes or underwear, and her dress was hitched up around her neck. Nelson had been stabbed in the chest. Prior to her identity being confirmed, she was dubbed "Betty Beavertail" after the nearby Beavertail Hill State Park. Nance is suspected of killing Nelson, but has not been definitively linked to the crime.

The body of Marcella Cheri "Marci" Bachmann, 16, was found in an advanced state of decomposition on December 24, 1984, by a wildlife photographer. The body had been buried in a shallow grave and her decomposed leg was protruding out of the frozen ground. Strong evidence indicates that Nance murdered Bachmann. Investigators found hair similar to Bachmann's in Nance's home. She had run away from Vancouver, Washington, due to conflict with her family. She was killed by three gun shots to the head. Like Devonna Nelson, Bachmann was given a nickname before she was identified: "Debbie Deer Creek," after a nearby drainage basin. Bachmann was identified in 2006 through DNA profiling. Her cremated remains were subsequently interred.

Bachmann had been seen alive with Nance, who had "taken her in" after she was left by a trucker in the area. She used the name "Robin" and claimed to have been either native to Texas or had passed through the state. When asked by acquaintances about the whereabouts of "Robin", Nance would say "she's gone" and claimed that she had run off with a trucker or that he had put "her on a bus." Bachmann's grave was two miles from Nance's home. Nance claimed she had left the area on September 28, 1984, which was about the time she was killed. Her brother, Derek Bachmann, had been searching for Marcella since he was 21 years old, along with a private investigator. He originally believed that she may have supported herself as a prostitute while away from home and may have become a victim of Gary Ridgway. Ridgway murdered at least 49 runaway children and prostitutes during the 1980s and 1990s. However, Marcella was never identified as one of his victims. When police conducted a search of Nance's home after his death, they found a series of photo-booth pictures of him and Bachmann. A strand of her hair was also found in Nance's truck.

On September 11, 1985, the skeleton of Janet Lee Lucas, 23, was found in Missoula, Montana, with two .32 caliber bullets in her skull, three miles away from where Bachmann had been found. Investigators believe she died between 1983 and 1985. Lucas' remains went unidentified until May 2021, and she was initially believed to be of Asian descent. Like the other Jane Does found near East Missoula, Lucas was given a name before she was identified, "Christy Crystal Creek". Based on examination, her age range was between 18 and 35 years old. She was between 4-feet-10 and 5-feet-2 inches tall and weighed between 90 and 110 pounds. Examination indicated that she most likely had a history of smoking and had many fillings in her teeth, as well as two root canals. She also had oral surgery that used characteristically Asian dental techniques, involving the screwing of a dental post into the tooth. After genetic genealogy research was conducted after a successful DNA extraction, it was learned that Lucas originated from Spokane, Washington, having disappeared from Sandpoint, Idaho during the summer of 1983. It is unknown when or why she came to Montana. Nance has not been definitively linked to this murder, but he is the only suspect.

Nance was also responsible for the December 12, 1985, murders of 34-year-old Michael Robert Shook and Teresa Lynn Shook, 32, in Ravalli County, Montana, who were tied up inside their home and stabbed to death. Nance, armed with a gun, walked into the household at 9 p.m. and introduced himself as "Conan the Barbarian". He then demanded their money and fired off a shot, which hit Teresa in the leg. A post-mortem examination would reveal that Nance had tried to dig the bullet out of her leg. This led to the belief that Nance had not intended to hit Teresa and was aiming to instead fire a warning shot. After shooting Teresa, Nance locked Michael and Teresa's three children into their shared bedroom.

A physical altercation ensued in which Michael suffered a blow to the head. He was then tied up and stabbed in the chest with a butcher knife. Teresa was forced upstairs and tied to the bed; she was raped before being stabbed to death herself. Her body would be found clothed, apart from her underwear, with a pillow over her face. A neighbor saw a pickup truck which matched the description of Nance's vehicle leaving the Shooks' property. Two hours later, Nance returned, robbing the family of an elk statue, a stag handled hunting knife and a silver dollar collection before attempting to set fire to the home. The fire smouldered but did not catch; however, the intended ignition material released cyanide gas into the airtight house. The couple's three children survived the crime after they were rescued by neighbors. Items stolen from the Shook residence were later found in Nance's home, and it was determined that Nance had delivered a new couch to Mike and Teresa Shook at their house only days before their murders.

=== Sexual harassment ===
During Nance's adulthood, he worked as a mover for the Conlin's Furniture department store, where he was described by his employers and co-workers as an "average guy." However, several female customers had complained about harassing phone calls they had begun to receive after getting a delivery from the store and had singled out Nance as being the caller. He had also begun taking photos of his female colleagues. Wayne was also reported for using a peephole which "he had found" and blamed on other members of staff. When questioned, these employees insisted it had been shown to them by Nance, not the other way around.

=== Final assault and death ===
On September 3, 1986, Nance attempted to murder husband and wife Douglas 'Doug' Wells and Kristen 'Kris' Wells. Nance worked at the Wells' furniture moving company. Doug discovered Nance lurking in the bushes outside of his property at midnight and demanded to know what he was doing, upon which Nance told him that he was passing by and had spotted someone lurking outside of the house. Nance asked if he could borrow a flashlight, and after Doug went with him inside, Nance struck Doug in the head, before tying up both him and Kris. Nance then stabbed Doug in the chest and left him to die in the basement. Nance forced Kris into the bedroom on the second floor to rape her.

Although badly wounded, Doug managed to free himself and load one round into a rifle he had been repairing. Doug caused a commotion to lure Nance away from Kris and to the top of the basement stairs. Nance and Doug engaged in an altercation, ending with Doug shooting and incapacitating Nance. Nance and the Wellses were rushed to a hospital, where Doug and Kris made full recoveries. Nance's injuries proved fatal, and he died the following day. After the incident with the Wellses, authorities investigated Nance's background and other crimes, after initially noting similarities between the Wells incident and the murders of Michael and Teresa Shook. Nance was found to be in possession of a large collection of photographs of Kris in his wallet. Some had been taken from the bushes along the route Kris would go for a jog. Others he had collated into a photo album, along with notes such as "I love you", "I am crazy about you" and "I want you to live with me."

== See also ==
- List of serial killers in the United States

== Cited works and further reading ==
- Coston, John (1992). To Kill and Kill Again: The Terrifying True Story of Montana's Baby-faced Serial Sex Murderer. Onyx Books. ISBN 978-0-451-40323-0.
