= Missoula (disambiguation) =

Missoula most commonly refers to Missoula, Montana, United States.

Missoula may also refer to:

- Missoula Metropolitan Area
- Missoula County
- Glacial Lake Missoula
- USS Missoula, naval vessels
- Fort Missoula
- Missoula: Rape and the Justice System in a College Town, a 2015 book by Jon Krakauer
