= Potomac Valley =

River valley in Missoula County, Montana

- Floor elevation: 3,360 ft (1,020 m)

Geology
- Type: river valley

Geography
- Country: United States
- State: Montana
- Region: Blackfeet/Clark Fork River
- District: Missoula County
- Population centers: Potomac, Montana
- Coordinates: 46.8750497114613°N 113.57230317558607°W
- River: [[Blackfeet River]],Clark Fork River
- Interactive map of Potomac Valley

Potomac Valley is a river valley in Missoula County, Montana. The valley encompasses two streams, Potomac, Montana, farmland, and others. The valley also offers vital habitat for wildlife.

== Geography ==
The Potomac Valley contains Camas and Union creeks. Other creeks include Arkansas Creek, a smaller but moderate stream, and many others unnamed or smaller in size. The Potomac Valley also contains other natural features like plentiful agricultural fields and nearby Garnet and Rattlesnake mountain ranges. The valley contains a wide variety of vegetation, with most being the Douglas Fir, Ponderosa Pine, Western Larch, and Lodgepole Pine. Common shrubs include the Pine Grass, Indian Paintbrush, Howell's gumweed, and Kinnikinnick.

== History ==
In the 1880s, settlers came to the area. Robert S. Ashby formed a settlement named Potomac after the Potomac River in Virginia, his home state. His settlement at the confluence of Canvas and Union creeks soon grew to include other small settlements and other establishments such as the Potomac School created in 1913, a key role in the development of the area. The Potomac Valley grew to become a central area for nearby miners, lumberjacks, and ranchers, making a perfect middle point to trade, collect goods, and more. After minor development in the early 1900s, Potomac and the Potomac Valley lost many of its residents. The community of Potomac had only 26 residents in the 2020 census.

In May 2026 the Case Ranch, a 2,330 acre homestead created by Arnold H. and Annabelle Case, was protected created in partnership between the family, the Five Valleys Land Trust, Montana Department of Fish, Wildlife, and Parks, the U.S. Department of Agriculture, and Missoula County. The project allows for continual protection of wildlife by ensuring habitat and conservation is available via block management.

== Lifestyle ==
The Potomac Valley is deeply rooted in agriculture, lumberjacking, and mining. Many fields of the valley are used primarily for agriculture planting or animal grazing. Additionally, present and past homesteads of the valley were made for agriculture with proximity to fields, corrals, barns, and more. While the valley has a small population, the area contains both an elementary and middle school (Potomac School) as well as a 4-H club.

== Wildlife ==
The Potomac Valley contains a wide variety of wildlife, many which are able to be hunted, trapped, or fished. Each stream of the valley contains its own variety of fish, but many share common species, including the cutthroat trout. Major mammals in the valley include deer, elk, black bears, grizzly bears, and bobcats. Birds include sandhill cranes, tundra swans, green-winged teals, pregerine falcons, and bobolinks.

== See also ==
- Powell County
- Lincoln, Montana
- Missoula, Montana
- Seeley Lake, Montana
- Seeley Lake
- Bonner, Montana
- Milltown, Montana
