= Richard William Davis =

American murderer and possible serial killer

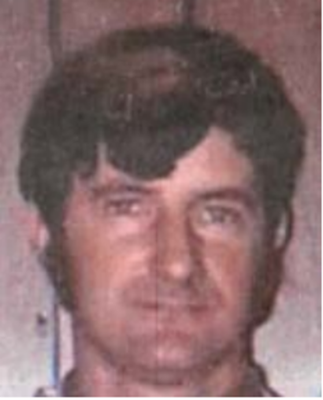
- Richard William Davis Davis in 1973
- Born: November 7, 1941; Galeton, Pennsylvania, U.S.
- Died: August 24, 2012 (aged 70); Cabot, Arkansas, U.S.
- Other names: "Dick"; William Nash

Details
- Victims: 1+
- Date: February 5, 1974
- Country: United States
- States: Montana, possibly others
- Date apprehended: N/A

Richard William Davis (November 7, 1941 – August 24, 2012) was an American child murderer, rapist, and possible serial killer who was posthumously linked via DNA to the abduction and murder of 5-year-old Siobhan McGuinness, who was found raped and stabbed near Turah, Montana, on February 7, 1974. Davis had never been convicted or considered a suspect in any violent crime during his lifetime. He died of natural causes in 2012.

In the aftermath of his identification, he was additionally linked to an attempted kidnapping in Bath, New York, in 1973. Due to the fact that he traveled extensively around the country, multiple state agencies and the FBI are currently investigating whether Davis can be linked to other violent crimes committed around the country.

== Murder of Siobhan McGuinness ==
=== Disappearance and murder ===
In the early morning hours of February 5, 1974, 5-year-old Siobhan McGuinness went missing from her neighborhood in Missoula while en route to her home. On that same day, another young girl had reported that a stranger had attempted to lure her into a shed and molest her, but she managed to flee unharmed.

K-9 units and volunteers organized a search to hopefully find McGuinness alive. Her father, Stephen, drew a facial composite of the stranger based on the unnamed girl's testimony, which depicted him as a Caucasian male with curly red hair, a medium build, approximately 5'11, and around 18–20 years old.

Three days later, McGuinness' body was found hidden in a highway culvert outside the city of Turah. The body was sent for an autopsy in Great Falls. Eventually, an autopsy concluded that McGuinness had been sexually assaulted, stabbed, and repeatedly beaten on the head.

=== Cold case ===
Local residents organized a reward fund of $7,000 for any information that could lead to an arrest in the case.

An unnamed 15-year-old youth was detained as a suspect in the case due to the fact that he owned a Cadillac with New York license plates, which police believed was driven by the perpetrator. After being subjected to a psychiatric evaluation and an interview, during which he was given truth serum, the youth's alibi was confirmed and he was officially exonerated as a suspect in the case.

The case quickly went cold. Over the following decades, the McGuinness case became a notorious unsolved murder in the state. Other cases from the surrounding area were solved and proven to be unrelated, including the murder of Donna Pounds and the abduction-killing of Susan Jaeger.

== Identification and investigation ==
In 2018, genetic genealogy helped with the identification of the Golden State Killer, bringing more attention to the method as a means for solving cold cases. As DNA had been preserved in the McGuinness case, the Missoula County Sheriff's Office, BODE Technology, and the FBI contacted Othram to develop a genetic profile of the suspected perpetrator. On October 26, 2020, the killer was officially identified as Richard William Davis, who had died from natural causes at his home in Cabot, Arkansas, on August 24, 2012.

At the time of the crime, Davis was 32. It is believed he was just passing through the state. Shortly after this announcement, he was additionally identified as the prime suspect in an attempted abduction of an 8-year-old girl from Bath, New York, in 1973.

Davis, a native of Galeton, Pennsylvania, was born on November 7, 1941. He had never been suspected or convicted of any violent crime throughout his lifetime, and at the time of his death, he was a born-again Christian who lived with his wife at their rural home in Cabot, Arkansas. He lived in Pennsylvania in the early 1960s before moving to several cities in South Dakota during the end of the decade. After living in Bath, New York, for some time, he moved to North Little Rock until the 1980s, whereupon he moved to Cabot. Until his death, he was a volunteer for the Big Brothers Big Sisters of America program.

Davis held various jobs and traveled around the country, including the states of Alaska, Colorado, Florida, Illinois, Mississippi, Montana, North Dakota, Ohio, Oklahoma, Oregon, Washington, and Wyoming. Due to this, the FBI suspects that he is possibly responsible for further murders and assaults committed across the country, and is looking for information that could possibly link him to such cases.
