= October 2020 Arctic blast in the United States =

Weather event in the Western United States

Meteorological history
- Formed: late October 2020

Cold front
- Lowest temp: −34 °C (−29 °F) in Potomac, Montana
- Max. snowfall: 17.3 in (440 mm)

Overall effects
- Areas affected: Western United States

The October 2020 Arctic blast descended over the Western United States in late October, toppling records far and readings plummet to some 40 °F (22 °C) below average. The cold front brought record breaking snowfall and temperature extremes for October in the contiguous United States.

== Affected areas ==
Virtually all of Western United States and Northern area was affected by the Arctic Blast. Temperatures plummeted well below average across many cities. Missoula set a record for its earliest zero-degree reading observed, hitting −7 °F (−22 °C) on 26th October, Missoula also logged its eighth-biggest snowstorm on record, with a hefty 13.8 inches (35 cm) falling in just two days. The snow came sweeping down the Plains too, Wichita had accumulated 1.3 in (3.3 cm) of snow by Monday, the heaviest snow it has experienced so early in a season. Temperature across the states Montana, Colorado, Utah were 20 to 40 °F (11 to 22 °C) below average

== See also ==
- Cold wave
- February 2015 North American winter
