= USS Missoula (APA-211) =

1944 Haskell-class attack transport

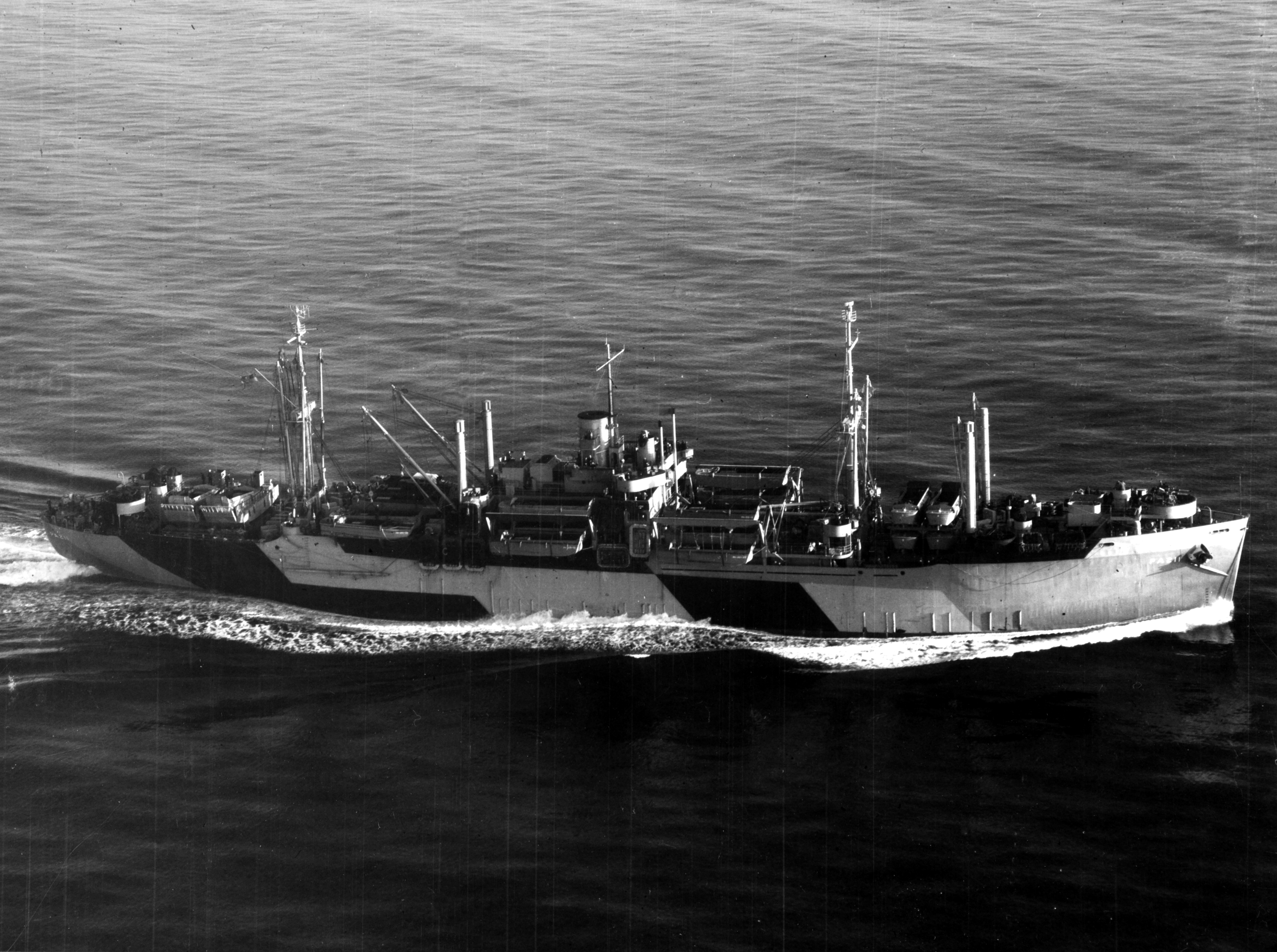

History

United States
- Name: Missoula
- Namesake: Missoula County, Montana
- Ordered: as a Type VC2-S-AP5 hull, MCE hull 559
- Builder: Permanente Metals Corporation, Richmond, California
- Yard number: 559
- Laid down: 20 June 1944
- Launched: 6 September 1944
- Sponsored by: The Harmonettes
- Commissioned: 27 October 1944
- Decommissioned: 13 September 1946
- Stricken: 1 October 1958
- Identification: Hull symbol: APA-211; Code letters: NPPK
- Honors and awards: 2 × battle stars for World War II service
- Fate: Sold for Non-transportation use (NTU), 5 March 1975, withdrawn, 8 April 1975

General characteristics
- Class & type: Haskell-class attack transport
- Type: Type VC2-S-AP5
- Displacement: 6,873 long tons (6,983 t) (light load); 14,837 long tons (15,075 t) (full load)
- Length: 455 ft (139 m)
- Beam: 62 ft (19 m)
- Draft: 24 ft (7.3 m)
- Installed power: 2 × Babcock & Wilcox header-type boilers, 465 psi (3,210 kPa) 750 °F (399 °C); 8,500 shp (6,338 kW)
- Propulsion: 1 × Westinghouse geared turbine; 1 x propeller
- Speed: 17.7 kn (32.8 km/h; 20.4 mph)
- Boats & landing craft carried: 2 × LCMs; 1 × open LCPL; 18 × LCVPs; 2 × LCPRs; 1 × closed LCPL (Captain's Gig)
- Capacity: 2,900 long tons (2,900 t) DWT; 150,000 cu ft (4,200 m^{3}) (non-refrigerated)
- Troops: 87 officers, 1,475 enlisted
- Complement: 56 officers, 480 enlisted
- Armament: 1 × 5 in (127 mm)/38 caliber dual purpose gun; 1 × quad 40 mm (1.6 in) Bofors anti-aircraft (AA) gun mounts; 4 × twin 40mm Bofors (AA) gun mounts; 10 × single 20 mm (0.8 in) Oerlikon cannons AA mounts

Service record
- Part of: TransRon 16
- Operations: Assault and Occupation of Iwo Jima (19–25 February 1945); Assault and occupation of Okinawa Gunto (9–14 April 1945)
- Awards: Combat Action Ribbon; American Campaign Medal; Asiatic–Pacific Campaign Medal; World War II Victory Medal; Navy Occupation Service Medal; Philippine Liberation Medal

USS Missoula (APA-211) was a Haskell-class attack transport in service with the United States Navy from 1944 to 1946. She was scrapped in 1975.

== History ==
=== Construction ===
Missoula was a Victory ship design, VC2-S-AP5. She was named after Missoula County, Montana, United States, and was the second ship to bear the name USS Missoula. The ship was laid down 20 June 1944, under Maritime Commission (MARCOM) contract, MCV hull 559, by Permanente Metals Corporation, Yard No. 2, Richmond, California; launched 6 September 1944; sponsored by the Harmonettes, a female vocal group; acquired by the Navy 27 October 1944; and commissioned at Richmond, the same day.

=== World War II ===
After shakedown along the California coast, Missoula steamed from San Francisco to Pearl Harbor 6 to 12 December. She trained in Hawaiian waters during the next 6 weeks; thence, with units of the 5th Marine Division embarked, she sailed 27 January 1945, for the scheduled invasion of Iwo Jima. Among her troops she carried the men who on two separate occasions raised the American flag atop Mount Suribachi during bitter fighting 23 February. Assigned to Transport Squadron 16, she steamed via Eniwetok to the staging area at Saipan, where she completed final preparations for the invasion.

==== Invasion of Iwo Jima ====
Missoula sortied with Rear Admiral Harry W. Hill’s TF 53 on 16 February. She reached the transport area off Beach Green 1 before dawn 19 February, lowered her landing boats, and at 07:25 began debarking troops for the assault. As Marines stormed the beaches and began the struggle for Iwo Jima, Missoula sent ashore troops and cargo from her position about 3,000 yd (1.7 mi; 2.7 km) offshore. Late in the afternoon she departed the transport area for night cruising at sea; thence, she returned the following morning and resumed unloading operations. During the next 5 days she continued this pattern of operations.

===== Raising the Flag on Mount Suribachi =====
While operating in the transport area 23 February, she received the following message at 10:35: "American flag now flying on Mount Suribachi Yama." Three Marines from Easy Company, 2nd Battalion, 28th Marines, had raised the national colors from the summit of Mount Suribachi at 10:20. That flag, the first of two which flew from Mount Suribachi that day, the second flag was a larger replacement flag, had come from Missoula. The 2nd Battalion adjutant, whose job it was to carry the flag, had brought the small set of colors from the attack transport during the invasion.

===== Medical assistance – return to Saipan =====
In addition, Missoula provided medical facilities for casualties of the fierce fighting ashore. Her four surgical teams treated 100 stretcher and ambulatory cases, 59 of whom were brought on board during the first day. After embarking a final group of casualties, she sailed in convoy for Saipan 25 February. The following morning one of the convoy escorts, Finnegan, detected, depth-charged, and sank Japanese submarine I-370. Missoula arrived Saipan 28 February; and, after debarking the wounded marines, she sailed for the New Hebrides with Transport Squadron 16 on 5 March.

==== Invasion of Okinawa ====
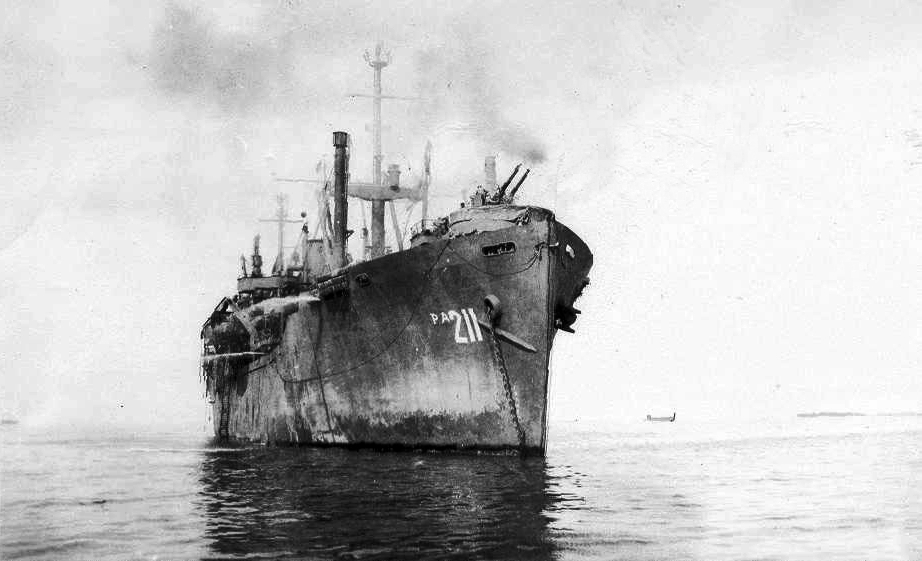
Missoula in the transport area off Okinawa. She appears to be firing her forward 40mm guns at attacking Japanese aircraft.

Steaming via Tulagi, Missoula reached Espiritu Santo 15 March and there embarked 1,177 Army troops of the 27th Division. She departed with other transports 25 March, touched at Ulithi 3 April, and arrived off the western beaches of Okinawa 9 April. During the next 5 days she discharged men and supplies and embarked 143 casualties of the Okinawa campaign; thence, between 14 and 18 April she steamed to Saipan.

==== Training for invasion of Japan ====
For much of the next month Missoula operated out of Ulithi after which she headed for troop training exercises in the Philippines. She arrived Subic Bay, Luzon, 31 May, and during the closing weeks of the war against Japan, she took part in preparing Army troops for a possible amphibious invasion of Japan. Following the atomic bombings of Hiroshima and Nagasaki, the Japanese ended hostilities 15 August; thence, Missoula supported the movement of occupation troops into Japan.

=== Transporting troops to Japan ===
As part of TF 33, Missoula departed Subic Bay 27 August. She entered Tokyo Bay on the morning of 2 September and began debarking troops of the 1st Cavalry Division at 09:51. Less than an hour before in another part of the bay, the Japanese Foreign Minister, Mamoru Shigemitsu, had signed the Instrument of Surrender on board USS Missouri (BB-63), thus officially ending World War II.

Missoula returned to the Philippines 4 to 11 September, and embarked additional occupation troops at Zamboanga and Mindanao. Departing Leyte Gulf 22 September, she arrived Okinawa 25 September, and on 3 October, sailed for the Inland Sea. Between 6 and 11 October, she debarked troops for the occupation of the rubble that was once Hiroshima.

=== Operation Magic Carpet ===
She returned to Okinawa 13 October and joined in the mighty task of returning veterans of the Pacific campaigns to the United States.

With 1,923 troops embarked, Missoula sailed 17 October, and arrived San Francisco 1 November. She departed on a second “Magic Carpet” run 21 November, and on 6 December, embarked 2,060 soldiers at Okinawa. She steamed to Tacoma, Washington, 8 to 21 December; thence, she returned to the western Pacific 21 January 1946, for further trooplift duty. She carried 692 men of the 2d Marine Air Wing from Okinawa to Yokosuka early in February, embarked more than 2,000 veterans at Okinawa and Guam later that month, and departed Guam for the west coast 22 February. Missoula reached San Francisco 5 March, discharged her passengers, and completed her "Magic Carpet" duty.

Assigned to the 19th Fleet 9 April, Missoula operated in the San Francisco Bay area during the next 5 months.

=== Decommissioning and fate ===
She decommissioned at Port Chicago, California, 13 September 1946 and entered the Pacific Reserve Fleet, Mare Island at Mare Island. Her name was struck from the Navy list 1 October 1958. She transferred to the Maritime Administration the same day and was assigned to the National Defense Reserve Fleet. She was berthed in Suisun Bay, California on 29 October 1958. On 5 March 1977, she was sold to American Ship Dismantlers, Inc., for $218,001, to be scrapped. At 11:15 PDT, on 8 March 1975 she was withdrawn from the Reserve Fleet and sent to the breaker's yard.

== Awards ==
Missoula received two battle stars for World War II service.

== Notes ==
Citations

== Bibliography ==
Online resources

- "Missoula II (APA-211)". Dictionary of American Naval Fighting Ships. Naval History and Heritage Command. 10 August 2015. This article incorporates text from this source, which is in the public domain.
- "Kaiser Permanente No. 2, Richmond CA". www.ShipbuildingHistory.com. 13 October 2010.
- "USS Missoula (APA-211)". NavSource. 20 July 2012.
- "Missoula (APA-211)". United States Department of Transportation. Archived from the original on 4 November 2016.
