= Twin Creeks, Montana =

- Census-designated place
- Location within Montana Location within the United States
- Coordinates: 46°54′25″N 113°44′25″W
- Country: United States
- State: Montana
- County: Missoula

Area
  - Total: 1.12 sq mi (2.89 km^{2})
  - Land: 1.12 sq mi (2.89 km^{2})
  - Water: 0 sq mi (0.00 km^{2})
- Elevation: 3,852 ft (1,174 m)

Population (2020)
  - Total: 164
  - Density: 146.7/sq mi (56.66/km^{2})
- Time zone: UTC-7 (Mountain (MST))
  - Summer (DST): UTC-6 (MDT)
- ZIP Code: 59823 (Bonner)
- Area code: 406
- FIPS code: 30-75550
- GNIS feature ID: 2806652

Twin Creeks is an unincorporated community and census-designated place (CDP) in Missoula County, Montana, United States. As of the 2020 census, it had a population of 164.

== Geography ==
It is in the eastern part of the county, on the north side of the Blackfoot River. The center of the community sits between East Twin Creek and West Twin Creek, two tributaries of the Blackfoot. Montana Highway 200 passes through the community, leading west 15 miles (24 km) to Missoula and northeast 35 miles (56 km) to Ovando.

According to the U.S. Census Bureau, the CDP has an area of 1.12 square miles (2.90 km^{2}), all land.

== Demographics ==
Historical population
Census	Pop.	Note	%±
2020	164		—
U.S. Decennial Census

== Education ==
The western portion is in the Bonner Elementary School District and the eastern portion is in the Potomac Elementary School District. All of it is in the Missoula High School District.
