= Piltzville, Montana =

- Census-designated place
- Location within Montana Location within the United States
- Coordinates: 46°51′40″N 113°52′09″W
- Country: United States
- State: Montana
- County: Missoula

Area
  - Total: 0.75 sq mi (1.94 km^{2})
  - Land: 0.75 sq mi (1.94 km^{2})
  - Water: 0 sq mi (0.00 km^{2})
- Elevation: 3,284 ft (1,001 m)

Population (2020)
  - Total: 372
  - Density: 497.6/sq mi (192.13/km^{2})
- Time zone: UTC-7 (Mountain (MST))
  - Summer (DST): UTC-6 (MDT)
- ZIP code: 59802 (Missoula)
- Area code: 406
- FIPS code: 30-57475
- GNIS feature ID: 2583832

Piltzville is an unincorporated community and census-designated place (CDP) in Missoula County, Montana, United States. The population was 372 at the 2020 census.

== History ==
The Piltzville neighborhood was home to workers at the lumber mill in neighboring Bonner. It is named after Billy Pilz, who became a yard boss at the Bonner Mill. His house was built in 1904.

Artist Michael Cadieux, known for his watercolors and oil paintings on environmental themes, is a native of Piltzville.

== Geography ==
Piltzville is in east-central Missoula County, bordered to the northwest by Bonner and 7 miles (11 km) east of Missoula. Interstate 90 passes through the community, with the nearest access from Exit 109 at West Riverside to the northwest or from Exit 113 to the southeast in Turah. Montana Secondary Highway 210 is the local highway through Piltzville, running parallel to the Interstate.

Piltzville is in the valley of the Clark Fork River, which forms the southwest border of the community. According to the U.S. Census Bureau, the CDP has an area of 0.75 square miles (1.94 km^{2}), all land.

== Climate ==
This climatic region is typified by large seasonal temperature differences, with warm to hot (and often humid) summers and cold (sometimes severely cold) winters. According to the Köppen Climate Classification system, Piltzville has a humid continental climate, abbreviated "Dfb" on climate maps. Piltzville is located at the base of Bonner Mountain, and sheltered from the winds.

Climate data for Piltzville, Montana
Month	Jan	Feb	Mar	Apr	May	Jun	Jul	Aug	Sep	Oct	Nov	Dec	Year
Mean daily maximum °C (°F)	−1 (30)	3 (37)	8 (46)	14 (57)	19 (66)	23 (74)	29 (85)	28 (83)	22 (72)	14 (57)	4 (40)	−1 (31)	13 (56)
Mean daily minimum °C (°F)	−9 (15)	−7 (20)	−3 (26)	0 (32)	4 (39)	8 (46)	10 (50)	9 (49)	5 (41)	0 (32)	−4 (24)	−8 (17)	0 (32)
Average precipitation mm (inches)	28 (1.1)	20 (0.8)	23 (0.9)	28 (1.1)	46 (1.8)	51 (2)	23 (0.9)	28 (1.1)	28 (1.1)	23 (0.9)	25 (1)	28 (1.1)	350 (13.6)
Source: Weatherbase

== Demographics ==
Historical population
Census	Pop.	Note	%±
2010	395		—
2020	372		−5.8%
U.S. Decennial Census

== Education ==
It is in the Bonner Elementary School District and the Missoula High School District.
