= Evaro, Montana =

- Census-designated place
- Location in Missoula County and the state of Montana
- Coordinates: 47°04′16″N 114°00′12″W
- Country: United States
- State: Montana
- County: Missoula

Area
  - Total: 17.16 sq mi (44.45 km^{2})
  - Land: 17.15 sq mi (44.43 km^{2})
  - Water: 0.0039 sq mi (0.01 km^{2})
- Elevation: 4,882 ft (1,488 m)

Population (2020)
  - Total: 373
  - Density: 22/sq mi (8.4/km^{2})
- Time zone: UTC-7 (Mountain (MST))
  - Summer (DST): UTC-6 (MDT)
- ZIP codes: 59821 (Arlee); 59808 (Missoula)
- Area code: 406
- FIPS code: 30-25000
- GNIS feature ID: 2408095

Evaro is a census-designated place (CDP) in Missoula County, Montana, United States, and part of the Missoula metropolitan area. It is located on the southernmost part of the Flathead Indian Reservation, approximately 20 miles (32 km) north of downtown Missoula via US Highway 93. As of the 2020 census, the population of the CDP was 373, up from 322 in 2010.

== Geography ==
The Evaro CDP is located in north-central Missoula County.

According to the U.S. Census Bureau, the CDP has a total area of 17.2 square miles (45 km^{2}), of which 0.006 square miles (0.016 km^{2}), or 0.03%, are water. The community is drained to the north by Finley Creek and its tributary, Schley Creek. Finley Creek is a tributary of the Jocko River, which runs northwest to the Flathead River near Sčilíp.

Evaro Hill, south of Evaro, is known as snɫp̓upƛ̓m or snɫp̓u ("small clearing on the hilltop") in Salish.

== Demographics ==
Historical population
Census	Pop.	Note	%±
2000	329		—
2010	322		−2.1%
2020	373		15.8%
U.S. Decennial Census

As of the census of 2000, there were 329 people, 110 households, and 84 families residing in the CDP. The population density was 19.3 inhabitants per square mile (7.5/km^{2}). There were 117 housing units at an average density of 6.9 per square mile (2.7/km^{2}). The racial makeup of the CDP was 47.72% White, 44.68% Native American, 0.30% Pacific Islander, and 7.29% from two or more races. Hispanic or Latino of any race were 10.03% of the population.

There were 110 households, out of which 42.7% had children under the age of 18 living with them, 60.9% were married couples living together, 10.0% had a female householder with no husband present, and 23.6% were non-families. 18.2% of all households were made up of individuals, and 7.3% had someone living alone who was 65 years of age or older. The average household size was 2.99 and the average family size was 3.43.

In the CDP, the population was spread out, with 32.8% under the age of 18, 9.4% from 18 to 24, 28.6% from 25 to 44, 24.6% from 45 to 64, and 4.6% who were 65 years of age or older. The median age was 31 years. For every 100 females, there were 103.1 males. For every 100 females age 18 and over, there were 102.8 males.

The median income for a household in the CDP was $36,250, and the median income for a family was $39,583. Males had a median income of $41,458 versus $21,875 for females. The per capita income for the CDP was $15,465. About 4.3% of families and 6.8% of the population were below the poverty line, including none of those under age 18 and 33.3% of those age 65 or over.

== Education ==
Almost all of Evaro is in the Arlee Elementary School District and the Arlee High School District. A small portion is in a unified K-12 school district, Frenchtown K-12 Schools.

== See also ==
- List of census-designated places in Montana
