= Orchard Homes, Montana =

- Census-designated place
- Location in Missoula County and the state of Montana
- Coordinates: 46°51′58″N 114°03′29″W
- Country: United States
- State: Montana
- County: Missoula

Area
  - Total: 5.88 sq mi (15.23 km^{2})
  - Land: 5.62 sq mi (14.56 km^{2})
  - Water: 0.26 sq mi (0.68 km^{2})
- Elevation: 3,133 ft (955 m)

Population (2020)
  - Total: 5,377
  - Density: 956.8/sq mi (369.41/km^{2})
- Time zone: UTC-7 (Mountain (MST))
  - Summer (DST): UTC-6 (MDT)
- ZIP Code: 59804 (Missoula)
- Area code: 406
- FIPS code: 30-55675
- GNIS feature ID: 2408996

Orchard Homes is a census-designated place (CDP) in Missoula County, Montana, United States. It is part of the Missoula metropolitan area. The population was 5,377 at the 2020 census.

== Geography ==
Orchard Homes is located in central Missoula County and is bordered to the east by the city of Missoula. U.S. Route 93 runs just east of the community, leading north to Interstate 90 and south to U.S. Route 12. Downtown Missoula is 3 miles (5 km) east of Orchard Homes.

According to the U.S. Census Bureau, the CDP has a total area of 5.88 square miles (15.2 km^{2}), of which 5.62 square miles (14.6 km^{2}) are land and 0.26 square miles (0.67 km^{2}), or 4.44%, are water. The CDP is bordered to the north by the Clark Fork River and to the west and south by its tributary, the Bitterroot River.

== Demographics ==
Historical population
Census	Pop.	Note	%±
1980	10,837		—
1990	10,317		−4.8%
2000	5,199		−49.6%
2010	5,197		0.0%
2020	5,377		3.5%
U.S. Decennial Census

=== 2020 census ===
As of the 2020 census, Orchard Homes had a population of 5,377. The median age was 44.7 years. 20.5% of residents were under the age of 18 and 23.5% of residents were 65 years of age or older. For every 100 females there were 94.7 males, and for every 100 females age 18 and over there were 93.4 males age 18 and over.

92.3% of residents lived in urban areas, while 7.7% lived in rural areas.

There were 2,191 households in Orchard Homes, of which 25.7% had children under the age of 18 living in them. Of all households, 54.3% were married-couple households, 15.6% were households with a male householder and no spouse or partner present, and 24.3% were households with a female householder and no spouse or partner present. About 25.4% of all households were made up of individuals and 11.7% had someone living alone who was 65 years of age or older.

There were 2,276 housing units, of which 3.7% were vacant. The homeowner vacancy rate was 0.9% and the rental vacancy rate was 1.3%.

Racial composition as of the 2020 census
Race	Number	Percent
White	4,750	88.3%
Black or African American	24	0.4%
American Indian and Alaska Native	157	2.9%
Asian	52	1.0%
Native Hawaiian and Other Pacific Islander	0	0.0%
Some other race	70	1.3%
Two or more races	324	6.0%
Hispanic or Latino (of any race)	202	3.8%

=== 2000 census ===
At the 2000 census, there were 5,199 people, 2,034 households and 1,466 families residing in the CDP. The population density was 814.9 inhabitants per square mile (314.6/km^{2}). There were 2,091 housing units at an average density of 327.8 per square mile (126.6/km^{2}). The racial makeup of the CDP was 95.35% White, 0.13% African American, 1.35% Native American, 1.29% Asian, 0.12% Pacific Islander, 0.52% from other races, and 1.25% from two or more races. Hispanic or Latino of any race were 1.35% of the population.

There were 2,034 households, of which 31.7% had children under the age of 18 living with them, 58.9% were married couples living together, 9.6% had a female householder with no husband present, and 27.9% were non-families. 21.0% of all households were made up of individuals, and 7.9% had someone living alone who was 65 years of age or older. The average household size was 2.55 and the average family size was 2.96.

24.2% of the population were under the age of 18, 9.7% from 18 to 24, 25.1% from 25 to 44, 28.4% from 45 to 64, and 12.6% who were 65 years of age or older. The median age was 40 years. For every 100 females, there were 95.3 males. For every 100 females age 18 and over, there were 94.2 males.

The median household income was $40,240 and the median family income was $47,612. Males had a median income of $32,226 and females $20,576 for. The per capita income was $17,885. About 4.4% of families and 6.7% of the population were below the poverty line, including 7.3% of those under age 18 and 4.3% of those age 65 or over.

== Education ==
Orchard Homes is divided between Target Range Elementary School District and Missoula Elementary School District, with a small portion in Hellgate Elementary School District. All of it is in Missoula High School District.
