= George Theodore Boileau =

George Theodore Boileau (September 12, 1912 – February 25, 1965) was an American prelate of the Roman Catholic church. He served as coadjutor bishop of the Diocese of Fairbanks in Alaska for seven months from August 1964 to February 1965.

George Boileau was born in Lothrop, Montana. He was ordained a priest in San Francisco by Archbishop John Mitty for the Society of Jesus on June 13, 1948. On April 21, 1964, Boileau was appointed titular bishop of Ausuccurra and coadjutor bishop of the Diocese of Fairbanks, Alaska; he was consecrated by Cardinal Francis Spellman on July 31, 1964. Boileau attended the Second Vatican Council in Fall 1964 in Rome.

Boileau died before assuming the office of bishop on February 25, 1965. The gymnasium at Monroe Catholic High School in Fairbanks, Alaska, is named Boileau Hall in his honor.
