= David Meirhofer =

American serial killer (1949–1974)

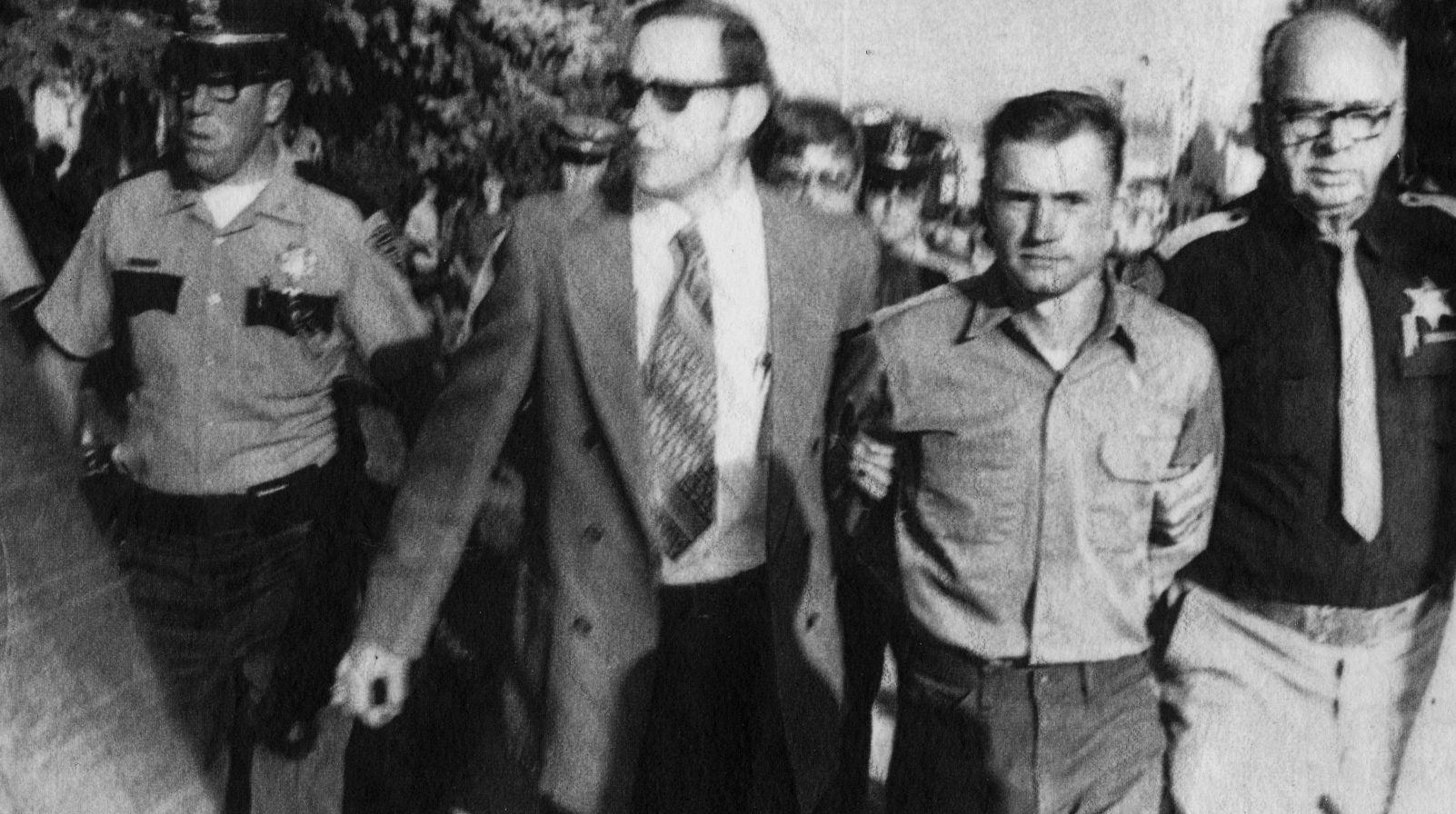
- Meirhofer arrested by FBI agents on September 25, 1974
- Born: David Gail Meirhofer; June 8, 1949; Bozeman, Montana, U.S.
- Died: September 29, 1974 (aged 25); Gallatin County Jail, Bozeman, Montana, U.S.
- Cause of death: Suicide by hanging
- Other name: "Mr. Travis"
- Penalty: N/A

Details
- Victims: 4
- Span of crimes: 1967–1974
- Country: United States
- State: Montana
- Date apprehended: September 25, 1974

David Gail Meirhofer (June 8, 1949 – September 29, 1974) was an American serial killer who confessed to four murders in rural Montana between 1967 and 1974—three of which were of children. Meirhofer killed himself shortly after confessing, and was never tried in court.

In the early 1970s, when Meirhofer's crimes were ongoing, the Federal Bureau of Investigation (FBI) had been refining a method of psychologically profiling criminal offenders, and Meirhofer would be the first serial killer to be actively investigated using this technique. Offender profiling is now a method commonly used to discover characteristics of an unknown offender from evidence at the scene of the crime.

== Early life ==
David Meirhofer was born on June 8, 1949, in Bozeman, Montana, one of Clifford and Eleanor Meirhofer's five children. Shortly after his birth, the family moved to the small town of Manhattan, where David would spend his childhood and adolescence. He attended the local Manhattan High School where, due to his melancholic temperament and introverted nature, he was considered an outcast and periodically bullied by other students.

After graduating in 1967, Meirhofer worked several odd jobs before being drafted into the Army in the fall of 1968. He enlisted in the Marine Corps on October 1, spending the next few months training at Marine Corps Recruit Depot San Diego as part of the Signal Corps. After completing his basic training, he was sent to MCAS Cherry Point, before being dispatched to fight in the Vietnam War in 1969, serving in the 5th Communications Battalion. For his service in Vietnam, he was awarded the National Defense Service Medal, the Vietnam Service Medal and the Vietnam Campaign Medal. In August 1971, he returned to the United States, where he continued his military service at Marine Corps Base Camp Pendleton.

In 1973, Meirhofer was honorably discharged from the Marine Corps and returned to Manhattan. There he supported himself as a self-employed handyman and carpenter, running a shop in the city.

== Kidnapping of Susan Jaeger, investigation and arrest ==
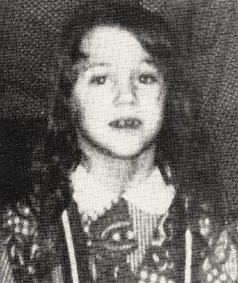
Susan Marie Jaeger

Meirhofer first came to police attention following the kidnapping of 7-year-old Susan Jaeger. The child had been abducted from a tent in the middle of the night on June 25, 1973, while camping with her family in Missouri Headwaters State Park. Three days later, a man called one of the FBI's regional offices in Denver, Colorado, claiming that he had kidnapped the girl and demanding $25,000 in ransom. On July 2, the Gallatin County Sheriff's deputy Ron Brown received a similar call. This time, the kidnapper demanded $50,000 and, to back up his claims, he described Jaeger's appearance, pointing out that she had a unique fingernail on one index finger, which was later confirmed by her relatives. Initially, police agreed to transfer the ransom, in a veiled attempt to catch the perpetrator, but this was unsuccessful, as nobody came to the drop-off point. On September 24, the kidnapper called the Jaeger family home and talked to Susan's older brother, 16-year-old Daniel, referring to his previous calls to the sheriff and the FBI to prove that it was him. By that time, in order to record the conversation, the family's house had been wiretapped, resulting in a successful recording of the full conversation. After examining it, the FBI managed to trace the caller to a filling station in Cheyenne, Wyoming. Despite this revelation, they were unable to apprehend a suspect, and the case remained dormant for several months.

In February 1974, approximately 1,200 skeletal fragments were found at the Lockhart Place, an abandoned ranch in Three Forks, Montana. Following a forensic examination, it was determined the fragments belonged to two separate victims: the first being a girl aged 6–8, while the other was a woman aged 18–20. Four months later, on June 25, 1974 (the one-year anniversary of Susan's kidnapping), the kidnapper called the Jaegers again. For approximately an hour, he talked with the girl's mother, Marietta, during which he reaffirmed that it was him by describing Susan's appearance and the phone calls, ending the conversation by saying that he was unable to return her. A few days later, authorities were contacted by a Three Forks resident named Ralph Green who reported an invoice for a phone call made on June 25, which he had not made. While investigating his telephone cables, policemen found a voice gateway and other devices that were built into a line break, which they suspected Susan Jaeger's kidnapper had used to make the call. Using this information, several profilers from the FBI, who had been working on refining a new technique in offender profiling, made a psychological profile of the supposed offender. By their estimations, the suspect was a white man, aged 25–30, likely local to the area, with a background in the telecommunications industry or the military, and a known social outcast who had problems interacting with others.

In the course of the investigation, police considered several suspects but gradually narrowed on Meirhofer as the most likely culprit. Police noted that a man matching his description had made frequent trips to Three Forks between 1973 and 1974, where he carried out construction and installation work at various ranches, including the Lockhart Place, where the remains of the two victims were found. After checking his travel schedule, they also successfully placed him in Wyoming in September 1973, after finding a receipt from an auto repair shop in Cheyenne stating that he had been there on September 24, the day the call to the Jaeger family was made. Based on this evidence, Meirhofer was arrested in August 1974 and brought to the police station for interrogation. However, he claimed that he was not responsible for Jaeger's abduction. In an attempt to prove his innocence, he agreed to be interrogated under the influence of sodium pentathol (then believed to be a "truth serum" that might make suspects less likely to lie). He also took a polygraph test, whose results proved inconclusive. Because they lacked any solid evidence to arrest him, the authorities ultimately released Meirhofer without any charges.

The audio recordings from his interrogation were later played for Susan's parents, who positively identified the caller as David Meirhofer. During September of that year, Marietta confronted Meirhofer several times, accusing him of killing her daughter and urging him to confess. After one such meeting, on September 24, the kidnapper, presenting himself as "Travis," called the family again, angrily declaring that they would never see their daughter alive again due to their cooperation with the police. During the phone call, Marietta referred to Meirhofer by his name, to which he did not respond. Unbeknownst to Meirhofer, the FBI had been monitoring the call, and after an audiophonoscopic examination, conclusively determined that he indeed was the caller, arresting him the next day.

While Meirhofer was detained at the Gallatin County Jail in Bozeman, authorities began a search of his house and the interior of his car. Searchers found bloodied women's clothing, washed-out blood stains, and a human hand and several fingers, the latter of which Meirhofer had kept in the refrigerator.

== Confessions and suicide ==
Upon learning of these findings, on September 29, Meirhofer confessed to two crimes. He admitted to abducting and killing Susan Jaeger, as well as 19-year-old Sandra Dykman Smallegan, who had gone missing on February 10 of that year from a basketball game in Manhattan. During the interrogation, Meirhofer admitted that he had attempted to establish an intimate relationship with Smallegan, but after she refused, he abducted her, tying and gagging his victim, from which she would later suffocate to death. In regard to Jaeger, he claimed that he had stabbed the girl to death shortly after kidnapping her, as she had resisted fiercely. His motive for the murder was never determined, as Meirhofer vehemently denied that his aim was to rape her. After killing his victims, Meirhofer dismembered the bodies with a hunting knife and a woodsaw and then burned them in a fire pit, before finally scattering their ashes and remaining bones at the Lockhart Place.

In an attempt to avoid capital punishment, Meirhofer's defense attorney brokered a plea deal involving the confession of two additional murders that had not been linked to Meirhofer. One was the death of 13-year-old Bernard L. Poelman, shot to death on a bridge in Three Forks on March 19, 1967, while swimming with a friend. Police had initially ascribed the Poelman incident to an accidental shooting or ricochet from hunters or target shooters. The second additional murder was that of 12-year-old Boy Scout Michael E. Raney, who had been beaten to death in Three Forks during an outdoor practice session on May 7, 1968. While a definitive motive for these murders was never established either, Meirhofer himself claimed that before killing Raney, he "wanted to get [...] a little kid." Interrogators suspected Meirhofer may have committed more than four murders, but confessed only to those in Gallatin County due to the plea deal with county prosecutors. Some of the Montana crimes that Meirhofer was suspected of committing were later attributed to Wayne Nance (1955–1986), another serial killer active in Montana in the 1970s and '80s; and to long-haul truck driver Richard William Davis, who was posthumously linked by DNA to the 1974 murder of a five-year-old girl in Missoula, Montana.

Four hours after giving his confessions, Meirhofer was found dead in his jail cell, having hanged himself with a towel. Jailers had not been informed Meirhofer was a murder suspect and he was not put on suicide watch. Sheriff Lesley "Andy" Anderson was formally censured by county officials for the suicide, and was voted out of office in the next election after two decades in the job.

The cases associated with Meirhofer were closed, but his reasoning and motivations for the murders remain uncertain.

Meirhofer's younger brother, Alan Meirhofer, was arrested in 1986 for a string of child rapes near Seattle, Washington. He was convicted in 1988 and released in 2017. He has declined to speak to journalists or police about possible connections between his and his brother's crimes.

== Media presentations ==
=== Books ===
Susan Jaeger's mother, Marietta Jaeger, wrote a book about Susan's kidnapping and murder. The Lost Child was published June 1983.

In 2022, author and journalist Ron Franscell wrote ShadowMan: An Elusive Psycho Killer and the Birth of FBI Profiling, about the Meirhofer case and the role played by the FBI's first-ever criminal profile, which had only been a theoretical concept at the Bureau to that point.

=== Television shows ===
The short-lived ABC docudrama series FBI: The Untold Stories re-enacts Susan Jaeger's kidnapping and the FBI investigation in search of her kidnapper, aired: October 1991.

External videos
- The FBI Files: Dark Woods at dailymotion

The police and FBI investigation into the abduction and murder of Susan Jaeger was portrayed in the May 27, 2003, episode of the television docudrama series The FBI Files entitled Dark Woods. In the episode, the name David Meirhofer was changed to David Masterson.

In September 2013, the Investigation Discovery series 20/20 on ID aired The Power of Forgiveness (S3 E5). Marietta Jaeger shares her emotional pain after receiving a call, that lasted an hour, from Meirhofer on the one year anniversary of her daughter's abduction and how the call aided in law enforcement's capture of Meirhofer.

== See also ==
- Terry Langford was an American killer executed in Montana (1998).

General:

- List of serial killers in the United States

== Cited works and further reading ==
- Jaeger, Marietta (1983). The Lost Child. Zondervan Publishing House. ISBN 0310458110.
- Douglas, John; Olshaker, Mark (1997). Journey Into Darkness: The FBI's Premier Investigator Penetrates the Minds and Motives of the Most Terrifying Serial Killers. New York City: Pocket Books. ISBN 978-1-439-19981-7.
- Jacobs, Don E. (2011). Analyzing Criminal Minds: Forensic Investigative Science for the 21st Century. Santa Barbara, California: Praeger Press. pp. 163–165. ISBN 978-0-313-39699-1.
- Ressler, Robert (1993). Whoever Fights Monsters: My Twenty Years Tracking Serial Killers for the FBI. New York City: Simon & Schuster. pp. 213–217. ISBN 978-0-67171-561-8.
- Wilson, Colin; Seaman, Donald (2011) [1990]. The Serial Killers: A Study in the Psychology of Violence. London, England: Virgin Books Ltd. pp. 87–90. ISBN 978-0-75351-321-7.
