= Missoula County Public Schools =

Public school district located in Missoula, Montana

Missoula County Public Schools No. 1 (MCPS) is a public school district located in Missoula, Montana. It consists of one pre-school, one adult learning center, nine elementary schools, three middle schools, four high schools, and one alternative high school. Only one school, Seeley-Swan High School, lies outside the city limits. The district motto is "Forward Thinking, High Achieving."

The district has two components: Missoula Elementary School District and Missoula High School District. The National Center for Education Statistics (NCES) code for the elementary district, which covers grades Pre-Kindergarten to 8, is 3018570. The NCES code for the high school district is 3018540.

The elementary district, entirely in Missoula County, includes most of Missoula, and sections of East Missoula, Lolo, and Orchard Homes.

The high school district is mostly in Missoula County, and includes areas in the elementary district as well as the remainders of the places within them, and all of: Bonner-West Riverside, Clinton, Condon, Piltzville, Potomac, Seeley Lake, Twin Creeks, and Turah, as well as a portion of Wye. A portion of the high school district is in Lake County.

== Schools ==
=== High schools ===
- Big Sky High School
- Hellgate High School
- Seeley-Swan High School
- Sentinel High School
- Willard Alternative High School Programs

=== Middle schools ===
- C.S. Porter School
- Meadow Hill Middle School
- Washington Middle School

=== Elementary schools ===
- Chief Charlo Elementary
- Cold Springs School
- Franklin Elementary School
- Hawthorne School
- Lewis and Clark Elementary
- Lowell School
- Paxson Elementary
- Rattlesnake School
- Russell School

=== Pre-schools ===
- Jefferson Center

== Adult education programs ==
- The Lifelong Learning Center
