= East Missoula, Montana =

- Census-designated place
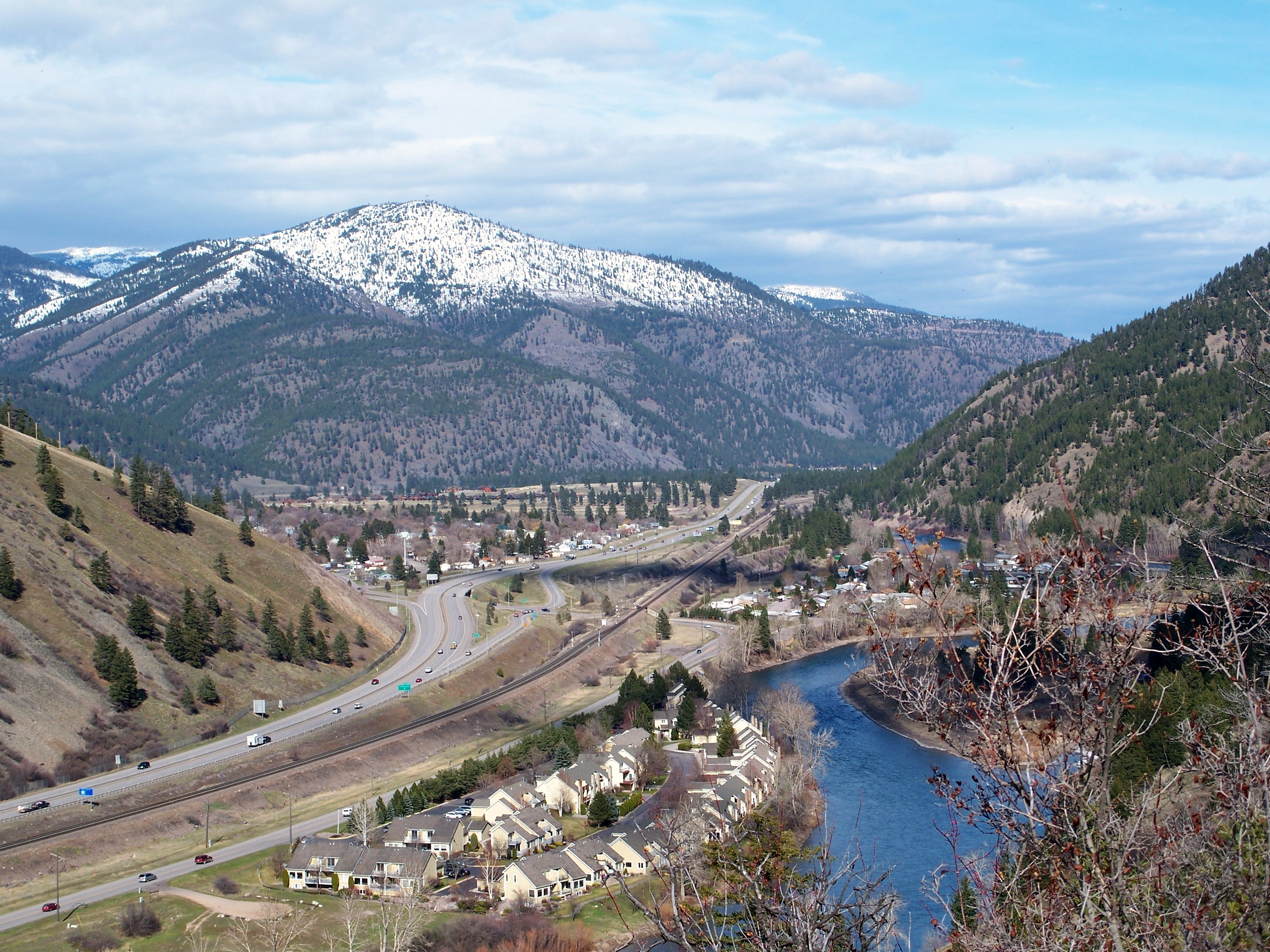
- East Missoula, Montana

- Location in Missoula County and the state of Montana
- Coordinates: 46°52′32″N 113°56′28″W
- Country: United States
- State: Montana
- County: Missoula

Area
  - Total: 1.25 sq mi (3.23 km^{2})
  - Land: 1.20 sq mi (3.12 km^{2})
  - Water: 0.042 sq mi (0.11 km^{2})
- Elevation: 3,225 ft (983 m)

Population (2020)
  - Total: 2,465
- Time zone: UTC-7 (Mountain (MST))
  - Summer (DST): UTC-6 (MDT)
- ZIP code: 59802 (Missoula)
- Area code: 406
- FIPS code: 30-23200
- GNIS feature ID: 2408713

East Missoula is an unincorporated community and census-designated place (CDP) in Missoula County, Montana, United States. It is part of the Missoula metropolitan area. The population was 2,465 at the 2020 census, up from 2,157 in 2010.

== Geography ==
East Missoula is located in central Missoula County and is bordered to the west by the city of Missoula. The Clark Fork River borders the community to the east, across which is an exclave of Missoula. Former U.S. Route 10 and Montana Highway 200 pass through the center of East Missoula, while Interstate 90 runs along the southern edge of the community, with access from Exit 107.

According to the U.S. Census Bureau, the East Missoula CDP has a total area of 1.25 square miles (3.2 km^{2}), of which 1.21 square miles (3.1 km^{2}) are land and 0.04 square miles (0.10 km^{2}), or 3.29%, are water.

=== Climate ===
This climatic region is typified by large seasonal temperature differences, with warm to hot (and often humid) summers and cold (sometimes severely cold) winters. According to the Köppen Climate Classification system, East Missoula has a humid continental climate, abbreviated "Dfb" on climate maps.

== Demographics ==
Historical population
Census	Pop.	Note	%±
1980	1,707		—
2000	2,070		—
2010	2,156		4.2%
2020	2,465		14.3%
U.S. Decennial Census

=== 2020 census ===
As of the 2020 census, East Missoula had a population of 2,465. The median age was 37.7 years. 17.2% of residents were under the age of 18 and 14.9% of residents were 65 years of age or older. For every 100 females there were 103.4 males, and for every 100 females age 18 and over there were 102.0 males age 18 and over.

99.2% of residents lived in urban areas, while 0.8% lived in rural areas.

There were 1,089 households in East Missoula, of which 25.8% had children under the age of 18 living in them. Of all households, 35.3% were married-couple households, 26.8% were households with a male householder and no spouse or partner present, and 26.2% were households with a female householder and no spouse or partner present. About 33.7% of all households were made up of individuals and 10.8% had someone living alone who was 65 years of age or older.

There were 1,145 housing units, of which 4.9% were vacant. The homeowner vacancy rate was 1.7% and the rental vacancy rate was 1.9%.

Racial composition as of the 2020 census
Race	Number	Percent
White	2,148	87.1%
Black or African American	4	0.2%
American Indian and Alaska Native	58	2.4%
Asian	16	0.6%
Native Hawaiian and Other Pacific Islander	4	0.2%
Some other race	34	1.4%
Two or more races	201	8.2%
Hispanic or Latino (of any race)	98	4.0%

=== 2010 census ===
As of the 2010 census, there were 2,157 people, 795 households, and 519 families residing in the CDP. The population density was 1,514.1 inhabitants per square mile (584.6/km^{2}). There were 828 housing units at an average density of 605.6 per square mile (233.8/km^{2}). The racial makeup of the CDP was 93.57% White, 0.34% African American, 3.24% Native American, 0.48% Asian, 0.24% from other races, and 2.13% from two or more races. Hispanic or Latino of any race were 1.64% of the population.

There were 795 households, out of which 33.0% had children under the age of 18 living with them, 48.6% were married couples living together, 11.6% had a female householder with no husband present, and 34.6% were non-families. 26.2% of all households were made up of individuals, and 6.3% had someone living alone who was 65 years of age or older. The average household size was 2.50 and the average family size was 3.01.

In the CDP, the population was spread out, with 24.3% under the age of 18, 10.3% from 18 to 24, 31.8% from 25 to 44, 22.9% from 45 to 64, and 10.7% who were 65 years of age or older. The median age was 36 years. For every 100 females, there were 105.0 males. For every 100 females age 18 and over, there were 104.2 males.

The median income for a household in the CDP was $27,094, and the median income for a family was $38,464. Males had a median income of $26,150 versus $18,000 for females. The per capita income for the CDP was $13,333. About 7.6% of families and 13.6% of the population were below the poverty line, including 5.0% of those under age 18 and 8.8% of those age 65 or over.

== Education ==
A portion of East Missoula is in Bonner Elementary School District while the other portion is in Missoula Elementary School District. All of it is in Missoula High School District.
