= Lolo Hot Springs, Montana =

Unincorporated community in Montana, U.S.

Coordinates: 46°43′40″N 114°31′50″W

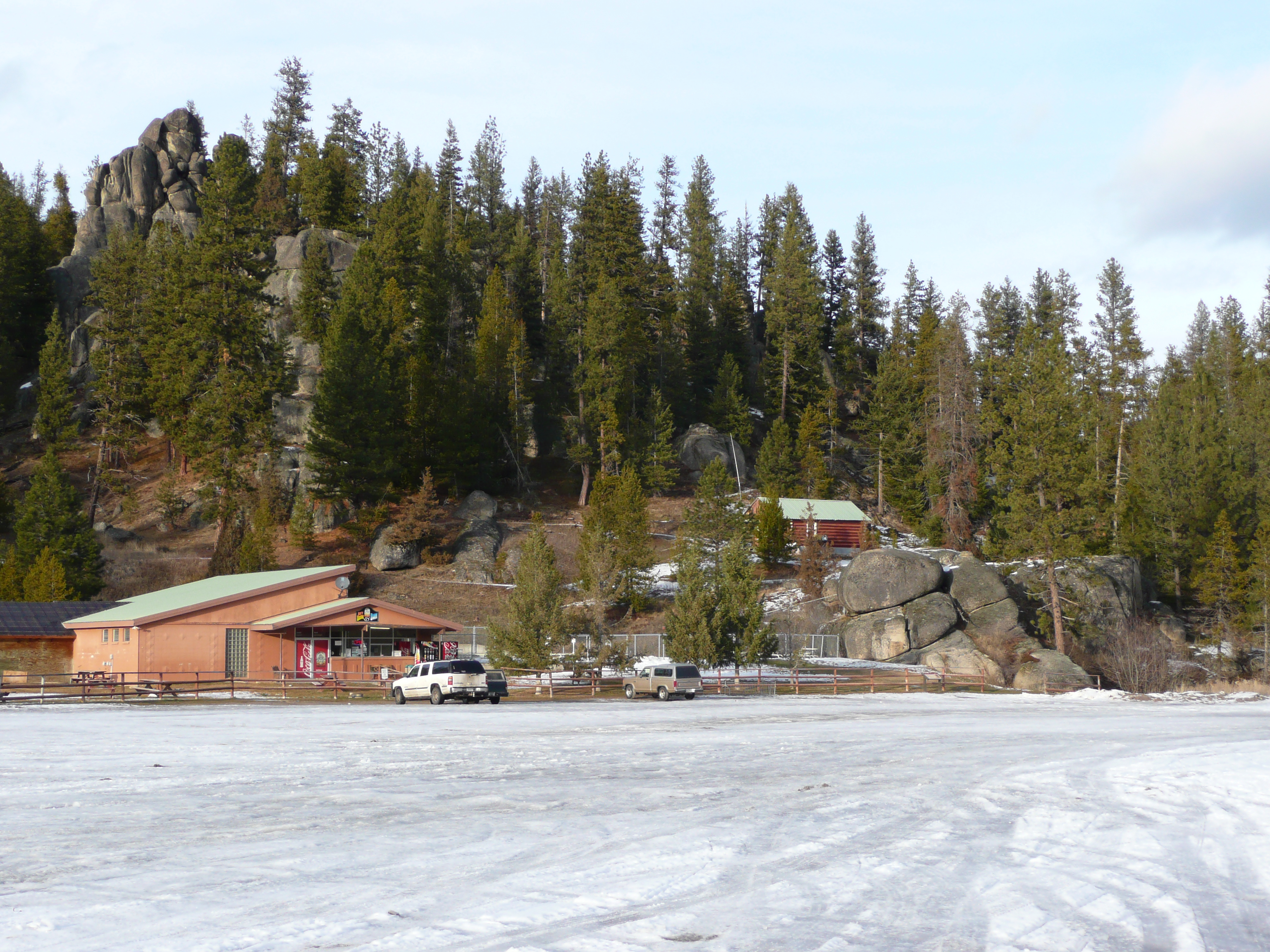
Lolo Hot Springs

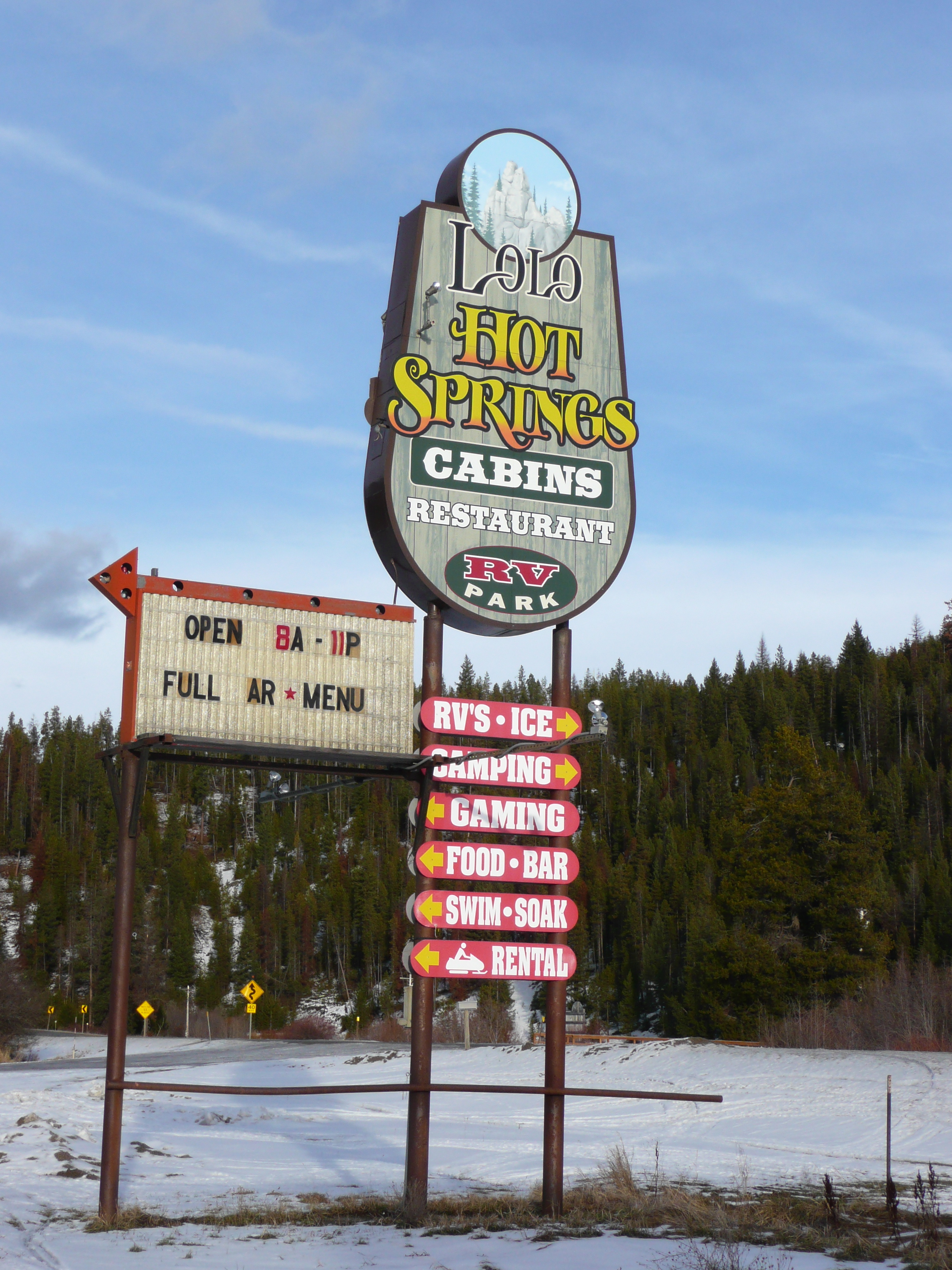
Lolo Hot Springs

Lolo Hot Springs (Salish: smtt̓m̓čqi or sntt̓mčqey, "Steam on a Ridge Top") is an unincorporated community in Missoula County, Montana, United States. It is centered on a commercial hot springs and contains a hotel and restaurant. Lolo Hot Springs is the westernmost settlement along U.S. Highway 12 in Montana.

The Salish name for the surrounding area is q̓ʷlótqne or čmulši.

The first luge run in North America was built here in 1965.

The Lewis and Clark Expedition passed by and used the springs on June 29, 1806, while traveling east on their return from the mouth of the Columbia River.
