= Lothrop, Montana =

Unincorporated community in Montana, United States

- Unincorporated community
- Location within Montana Location within the United States
- Coordinates: 46°59′27″N 114°26′49″W
- Country: United States
- State: Montana
- County: Missoula
- Elevation: 2,963 ft (903 m)
- Time zone: UTC-7 (Mountain (MST))
  - Summer (DST): UTC-6 (MDT)
- Area code: 406
- GNIS feature ID: 786642

Lothrop (also Lothrup) is an unincorporated community in Missoula County, Montana, United States.

== Notable person ==
- George Theodore Boileau, American Roman Catholic bishop
