= Bonner-West Riverside, Montana =

- Census-designated place
- Location in Missoula County and the state of Montana
- Coordinates: 46°52′25″N 113°52′28″W
- Country: United States
- State: Montana
- County: Missoula

Area
  - Total: 1.61 sq mi (4.18 km^{2})
  - Land: 1.53 sq mi (3.97 km^{2})
  - Water: 0.081 sq mi (0.21 km^{2})
- Elevation: 3,288 ft (1,002 m)

Population (2020)
  - Total: 1,690
  - Density: 1,101.6/sq mi (425.34/km^{2})
- Time zone: UTC-7 (Mountain (MST))
  - Summer (DST): UTC-6 (MDT)
- ZIP Code: 59851
- Area code: 406
- FIPS code: 30-08462
- GNIS feature ID: 2407883

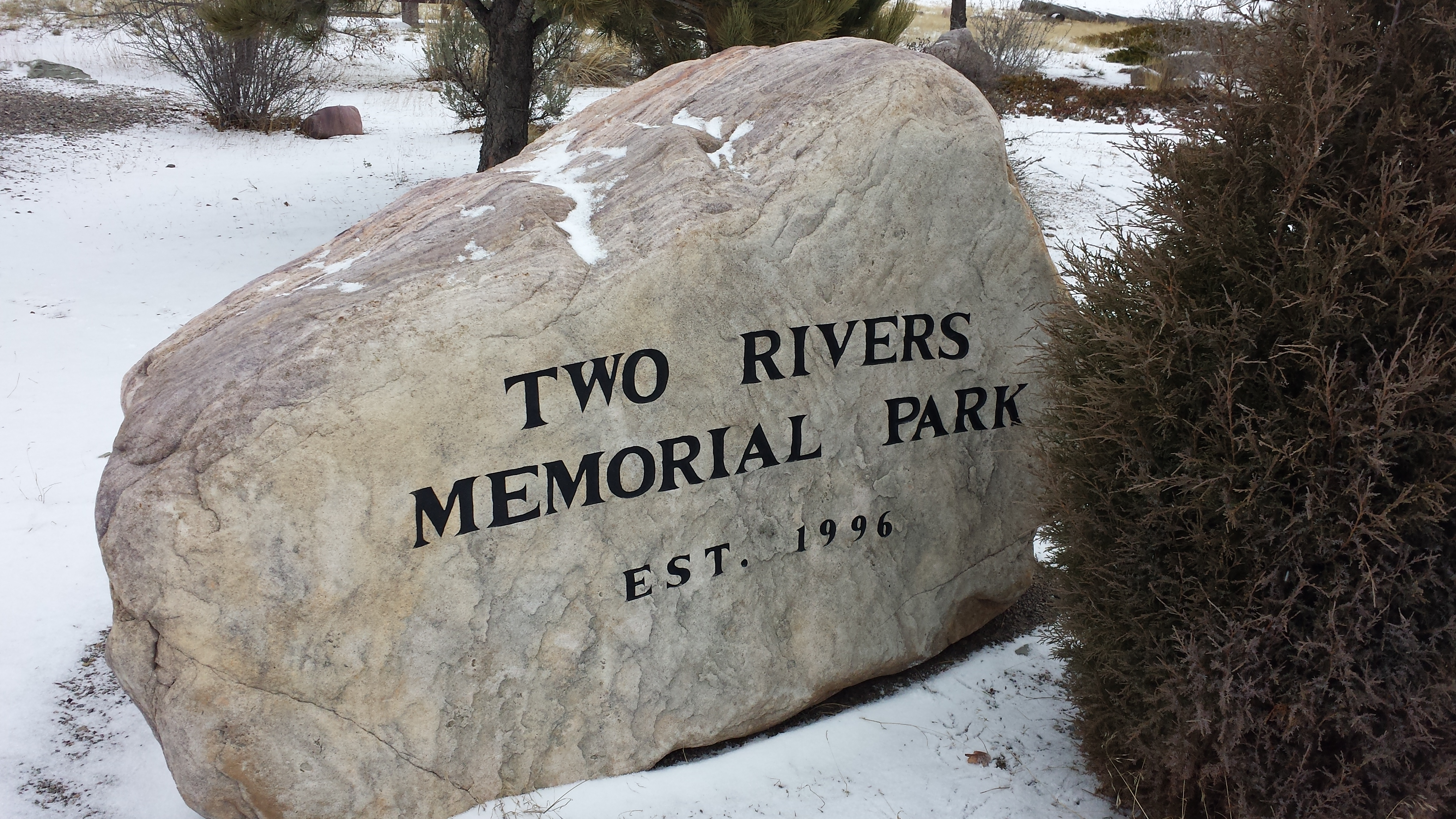
Rock marking Two Rivers Memorial Park

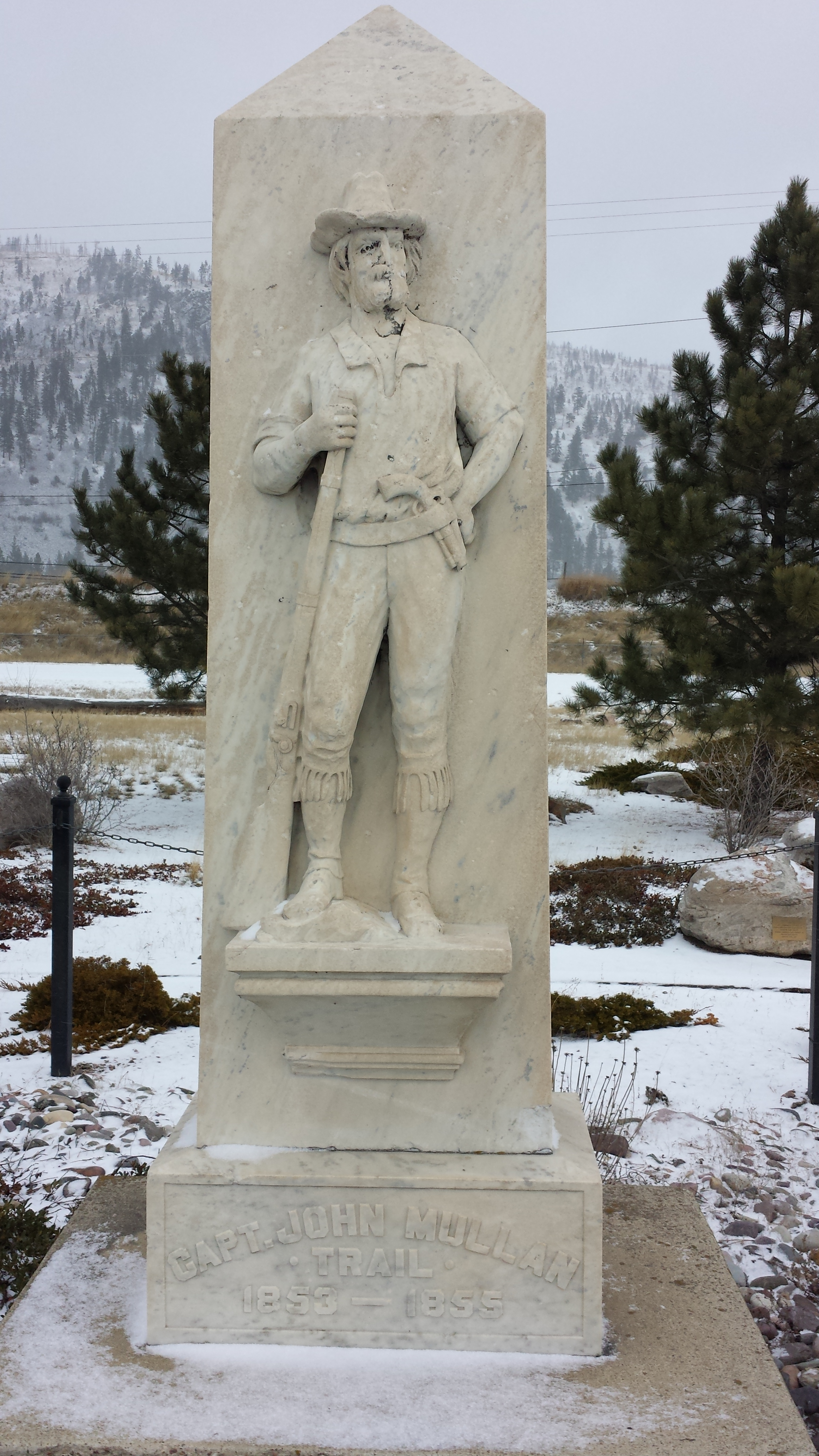
John Mullan monument

Bonner-West Riverside (Salish: Nʔaycčstm, "Place of the Big Bull Trout") is a census-designated place (CDP) in Missoula County, Montana, United States, including the unincorporated communities of Bonner, Milltown (formerly Riverside), West Riverside, and Pinegrove. It is part of the Missoula metropolitan area. The population was 1,690 at the 2020 census.

Bonner was named for Edward L. Bonner, president of the Missoula and Bitter Root Valley Railroad. Bonner was also a partner in Eddy, Hammond & Company, who were contracted by the Northern Pacific Railroad for lumber to build their railway between the Thompson and Blackfoot rivers. Eddy, Hammond & Company founded the Montana Improvement Company, which built a sawmill in Bonner in 1886.

Milltown is named for the mill. West Riverside is named for its position west of Milltown, formerly called "Riverside" for its position at the confluence of the Blackfoot and Clark Fork rivers. Pinegrove was named either for the Pine family that settled there or for the many large pines in the area. The associated Piltzville was named for Billy Piltz, early mill worker and yard boss.

== History ==
The area east of Missoula was born with the sawmill located there by Andrew B. Hammond. Hammond, with partners Richard Eddy and Edward Bonner, founders of the Montana Improvement Company (MIC), enticed the nearly complete Northern Pacific Railroad (NP) to pass through Missoula. They were rewarded with lucrative NP lumber contracts. Hammond, on behalf of the MIC, purchased land east of Missoula on Blackfoot River for a sawmill and dam to hold the mill's supply of logs. The Blackfoot Milling Company began operation on 6 June 1886 and by August produced an average of 55,000 board feet of lumber per day. In addition to the NP contracts, the Blackfoot Mill (or Hammond Mill) provided stulls (mining shaft supports) and lumber for construction. It continued to expand and in 1889 it produced 24 million board feet of lumber and was considered the largest mill between Wisconsin and the West Coast. The sawmill was purchased by the Anaconda Company in 1898.

Bonner was the company town, encompassing the mill plus housing for mill managers and supervisors and a company store. By 1888, it included a post office, and in 1889 Bonner Hall, which housed the Masonic Lodge and the first school. In 1892, the elegant Margaret Hotel was built to house dignitaries. Later, a school, two churches, a library and community gardens were added. Only mill employees lived there. When the mill changed hands, Bonner with all its buildings was included. Bonner remained a possession of the mill until finally sold to private ownership in 2007.

Milltown, originally called "Riverside", was organized a half mile downstream. John McCormick leased small lots of his "farmland" to mill workers and loggers who constructed small dwellings with materials "borrowed" from the mill. By 1892, Riverside already had a dozen homes, a livery stable, boarding house, and three saloons. In 1903, the anticipated construction of the new dam brought more workers who leased land. No one owned the land their homes were on until decades later.

In 1910, West Riverside was platted across the Blackfoot from Riverside, allowing for private land ownership. Population increased there with the establishment of the Western Lumber Company. Farming and more private homes became available to the east in Piltzville and to the west in Pine Grove.

"On January 16, 1919, the 'greatest fire in the history of Western Montana' burned a large portion of the mill to the ground." The mill was rebuilt and operational again by September 1919. Through the 1970s and 1980s, the Bonner Mill was thought to be the world's largest of its type. The Anaconda Company sold the mill to US Plywood-Champion Papers in 1972. It was sold to Stimson Lumber Company in 1993 and was closed in 2008, after "122 years of continuous lumber production". In 2011, a heavy snowfall collapsed much of the mill's roof. The last PCBs were removed from the site in 2016.

Bonner Dam was built in 1884 (rebuilt in 1886) on the Blackfoot River to hold logs and provide a little energy to the mill. Milltown Dam (aka Clark's Dam), finished in January 1908, was built just passed the confluence of the Blackfoot and Clark Fork rivers by Montana's U.S Senator William A. Clark to supply hydroelectricity to local mills and the city of Missoula. The largest flood ever seen on those rivers occurred six months later, depositing millions of cubic yards of silt laden with heavy metals and arsenic in the Milltown Reservoir from upriver mining sites. As part of a Superfund cleanup site, Bonner Dam was removed in 2005 and Milltown Dam was removed in 2008. The Superfund restoration plan includes a redevelopment effort aimed at economic development and community revitalization.

== Geography ==
Bonner-West Riverside is located in central Missoula County and is bordered to the west by the city of Missoula and to the southeast by unincorporated Piltzville. The Clark Fork River is the southwest border of the CDP, separating it from Missoula. The Blackfoot River flows through the CDP, separating Bonner and Milltown to the east from West Riverside and Pinegrove to the west, and joining the Clark Fork south of West Riverside.

Interstate 90 passes through the southern part of the community, with access from Exit 109. Montana Highway 200 and Montana Secondary Highway 210 (former U.S. Route 10) pass through the CDP, leading west 5 miles (8 km) to the center of Missoula. The two highways split in Milltown, with Highway 200 leading northeast 159 miles (256 km) to Great Falls and Highway 210 leading southeast through Piltztown to join Interstate 90 at Clinton. Butte, Montana, is 112 miles (180 km) southeast of Bonner-West Riverside via I-90.

According to the U.S. Census Bureau, the CDP has a total area of 1.62 square miles (4.2 km^{2}), of which 1.53 square miles (4.0 km^{2}) are land and 0.08 square miles (0.21 km^{2}), or 5.02%, are water.

=== Climate ===
This climatic region is typified by large seasonal temperature differences, with warm to hot (and often humid) summers and cold (sometimes severely cold) winters. According to the Köppen Climate Classification system, Bonner-West Riverside has a humid continental climate, abbreviated "Dfb" on climate maps.

== Demographics ==
Historical population
| Census | Pop. | Note | %± |
|---|---|---|---|
| 1980 | 1,742 | | — |
| 1990 | 1,669 | | −4.2% |
| 2000 | 1,693 | | 1.4% |
| 2010 | 1,663 | | −1.8% |
| 2020 | 1,690 | | 1.6% |
U.S. Decennial Census

=== 2020 census ===
As of the 2020 census, Bonner-West Riverside had a population of 1,690. The median age was 38.2 years. 21.4% of residents were under the age of 18 and 16.6% of residents were 65 years of age or older. For every 100 females there were 102.9 males, and for every 100 females age 18 and over there were 99.4 males age 18 and over.

98.7% of residents lived in urban areas, while 1.3% lived in rural areas.

There were 727 households in Bonner-West Riverside, of which 21.7% had children under the age of 18 living in them. Of all households, 36.5% were married-couple households, 24.1% were households with a male householder and no spouse or partner present, and 28.6% were households with a female householder and no spouse or partner present. About 35.4% of all households were made up of individuals and 14.7% had someone living alone who was 65 years of age or older.

There were 773 housing units, of which 6.0% were vacant. The homeowner vacancy rate was 0.0% and the rental vacancy rate was 3.0%.

Racial composition as of the 2020 census
| Race | Number | Percent |
|---|---|---|
| White | 1,475 | 87.3% |
| Black or African American | 6 | 0.4% |
| American Indian and Alaska Native | 54 | 3.2% |
| Asian | 8 | 0.5% |
| Native Hawaiian and Other Pacific Islander | 3 | 0.2% |
| Some other race | 16 | 0.9% |
| Two or more races | 128 | 7.6% |
| Hispanic or Latino (of any race) | 76 | 4.5% |

=== 2010 census ===
As of the census of 2010, there were 1,663 people, 690 households, and 460 families residing in the CDP. The population density was 1,091.6 inhabitants per square mile (421.5/km^{2}). There were 723 housing units at an average density of 466.2 per square mile (180.0/km^{2}). The racial makeup of the CDP was 94.39% White, 0.24% African American, 2.36% Native American, 0.06% Asian, 0.59% from other races, and 2.36% from two or more races. Hispanic or Latino of any race were 1.71% of the population.

There were 690 households, out of which 33.2% had children under the age of 18 living with them, 49.3% were married couples living together, 11.2% had a female householder with no husband present, and 33.2% were non-families. 25.1% of all households were made up of individuals, and 6.8% had someone living alone who was 65 years of age or older. The average household size was 2.45 and the average family size was 2.93.

In the CDP, the population was spread out, with 25.9% under the age of 18, 12.8% from 18 to 24, 31.7% from 25 to 44, 21.4% from 45 to 64, and 8.2% who were 65 years of age or older. The median age was 32 years. For every 100 females there were 104.0 males. For every 100 females age 18 and over, there were 102.7 males.

The median income for a household in the CDP was $32,557, and the median income for a family was $37,206. Males had a median income of $28,417 versus $25,403 for females. The per capita income for the CDP was $15,652. About 8.3% of families and 10.9% of the population were below the poverty line, including 10.6% of those under age 18 and 9.1% of those age 65 or over.

== Education ==
It is in the Bonner Elementary School District and the Missoula High School District.
