= Huson, Montana =

Unincorporated community in Montana, United States

- Census-designated place
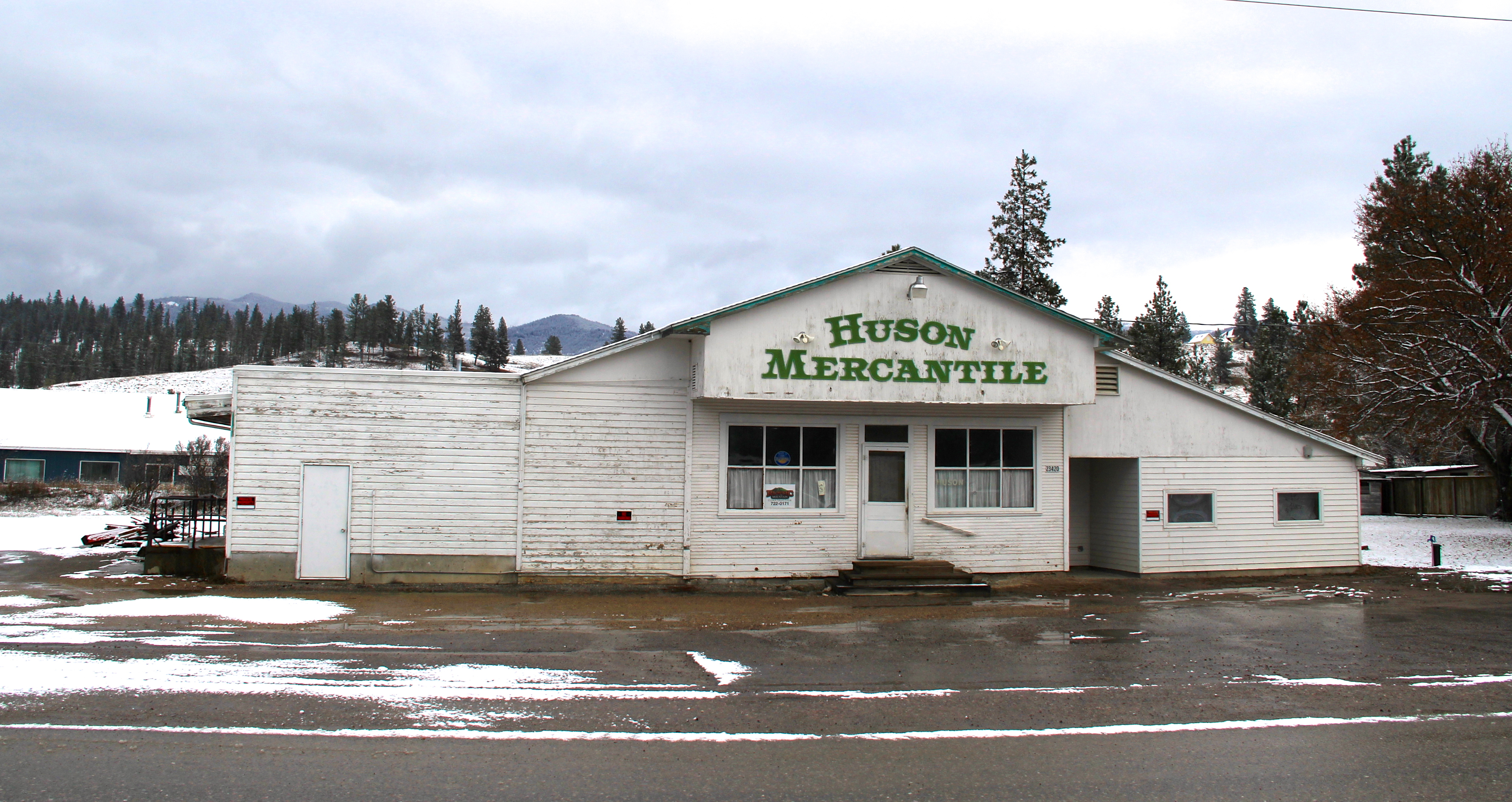

- Location within Montana Location within the United States
- Coordinates: 47°01′57″N 114°20′25″W
- Country: United States
- State: Montana
- County: Missoula

Area
  - Total: 0.78 sq mi (2.01 km^{2})
  - Land: 0.76 sq mi (1.98 km^{2})
  - Water: 0.012 sq mi (0.03 km^{2})
- Elevation: 3,005 ft (916 m)

Population (2020)
  - Total: 256
  - Density: 334.7/sq mi (129.21/km^{2})
- Time zone: UTC-7 (Mountain (MST))
  - Summer (DST): UTC-6 (MDT)
- ZIP code: 59846
- Area code: 406
- GNIS feature ID: 2583817
- FIPS code: 30-38275

Huson is a census-designated place and unincorporated community in Missoula County, Montana, United States. Its population was 256 as of the 2020 census, up from 210 in 2010.

== History ==
Huson was established as a railroad station in about 1894. The post office opened as Glaude in about 1897, but was changed to Huson around a year later.

== Geography ==
Huson is in northwestern Missoula County, in the valley of the Clark Fork River, which forms the southern border of the community. It is served by Exit 85 of Interstate 90, which leads southeast 20 miles (32 km) to Missoula and northwest 38 miles (61 km) to Superior.

According to the U.S. Census Bureau, the Huson CDP has an area of 0.78 square miles (2.02 km^{2}), of which 0.01 square miles (0.03 km^{2}), or 1.54%, are water.

== Demographics ==
Historical population
Census	Pop.	Note	%±
2010	210		—
2020	256		21.9%
U.S. Decennial Census

== Education ==
Frenchtown Public Schools, a unified K-12 school district, covers all of the CDP,
