= USS Missoula =

USS Missoula may refer to the following ships of the United States Navy:

- USS Missoula (CA-13), was the Montana renamed in 1915
- USS Missoula (APA-211), was a transport in service from 1943 to 1968
