= Carlton, Montana =

- Census-designated place
- Location within Montana Location within the United States
- Coordinates: 46°40′47″N 114°04′19″W
- Country: United States
- State: Montana
- County: Missoula

Area
  - Total: 6.18 sq mi (16.00 km^{2})
  - Land: 6.16 sq mi (15.95 km^{2})
  - Water: 0.019 sq mi (0.05 km^{2})
- Elevation: 3,186 ft (971 m)

Population (2020)
  - Total: 721
  - Density: 117/sq mi (45.2/km^{2})
- Time zone: UTC-7 (Mountain (MST))
  - Summer (DST): UTC-6 (MDT)
- ZIP code: 59833 (Florence)
- Area code: 406
- FIPS code: 30-12435
- GNIS feature ID: 2583796

Carlton is a census-designated place (CDP) in Missoula County, Montana, United States. The population was 721 at the 2020 census.

== Geography ==
Carlton is in southern Missoula County in western Montana, in the northern part of the Bitterroot Valley. The southern border of the community follows the Ravalli County line. U.S. Route 93 passes through the community, leading north 17 miles (27 km) to Missoula and south 30 miles (48 km) to Hamilton. The post office that covers the CDP is in Florence (ZIP Code 59833), 3 miles (5 km) south of Carlton.

According to the U.S. Census Bureau, the Carlton CDP has an area of 6.18 square miles (16.01 km^{2}), of which 0.02 square miles (0.05 km^{2}), or 0.31%, are water. The north-flowing Bitterroot River forms the eastern border of the community, while Carlton Creek flows through the center, joining Sin-tin-tin-em-ska Creek, a north-flowing tributary of the Bitterroot.

== Demographics ==
Historical population
Census	Pop.	Note	%±
2010	694		—
2020	721		3.9%
U.S. Decennial Census

== Education ==
Florence-Carlton K-12 Schools, a unified K-12 school district, covers all of the CDP The Florence-Carlton School District educates students from kindergarten through 12th grade. It is located in Florence.
