= Potomac, Montana =

- Census-designated place
- Location within Montana Location within the United States
- Coordinates: 46°52′53″N 113°34′30″W
- Country: United States
- State: Montana
- County: Missoula

Area
  - Total: 0.27 sq mi (0.71 km^{2})
  - Land: 0.27 sq mi (0.71 km^{2})
  - Water: 0 sq mi (0.00 km^{2})
- Elevation: 3,635 ft (1,108 m)

Population (2020)
  - Total: 26
  - Density: 94.6/sq mi (36.52/km^{2})
- Time zone: UTC-7 (Mountain (MST))
  - Summer (DST): UTC-6 (MDT)
- ZIP Code: 59823
- Area code: 406
- FIPS code: 30-59350
- GNIS feature ID: 2806651

Potomac is an unincorporated community and census-designated place (CDP) in Missoula County, Montana, United States. It was first listed as a CDP prior to the 2020 census, at which time it had a population of 26.

== History ==
In the 1880's, settlers including Robert S. Ashby who formed a settlement named Potomac after the Potomac River in Virginia, his home state. His settlement at the confluence of Canvas and Union creeks soon grew to include other small settlmenets and other establishments such as the Potomac School created in 1913, a key role in the development of the area. The Potomac Valley grew to become a central area for nearby miners, lumberjacks, and ranchers, making a perfect middle point to trade, collect goods, and more. After minor development in the early 1900's, Potomac and the Potomac Valley lost many of its residents, with around 20 left today. Recently, the Case Ranch, a 2,330 acre homestead created by Arnold H. and Annabelle Case was protected in May 2026 created in partnership between the family, the Five Valleys Land Trust, Montana Department of Fish, Wildlife, and Parks, the U.S. Department of Agriculture, and Missoula County. The project allows for continual protection of wildlife by ensuring habitat and conservation is available via block management.

== Geography ==
Potomac is in the southeastern part of Missoula County, in the Potomac Valley formed of Camas Creek and Union Creek, which flows northwest to the Blackfoot River, part of the Clark Fork watershed. Montana Highway 200 passes along the northern edge of the community, leading northeast 28 miles (45 km) to Ovando and west 23 miles (37 km) to Missoula.

According to the U.S. Census Bureau, the Potomac CDP has an area of 0.28 square miles (0.73 km^{2}), all land.

=== Climate ===
According to the Köppen Climate Classification system, Potomac has a warm-summer humid continental climate, abbreviated "Dfb" on climate maps. The hottest temperature recorded in Potomac was 103 °F (39.4 °C) on July 14, 002, while the coldest temperature recorded was −50 °F (−45.6 °C) on December 23–24, 1983.

Climate data for Potomac, Montana, 1991–2020 normals, extremes 1964–present
| Month | Jan | Feb | Mar | Apr | May | Jun | Jul | Aug | Sep | Oct | Nov | Dec | Year |
|---|---|---|---|---|---|---|---|---|---|---|---|---|---|
| Record high °F (°C) | 60 (16) | 64 (18) | 76 (24) | 86 (30) | 97 (36) | 97 (36) | 103 (39) | 102 (39) | 97 (36) | 88 (31) | 72 (22) | 64 (18) | 103 (39) |
| Mean maximum °F (°C) | 46.2 (7.9) | 50.6 (10.3) | 62.4 (16.9) | 74.3 (23.5) | 83.4 (28.6) | 88.4 (31.3) | 95.3 (35.2) | 94.3 (34.6) | 89.2 (31.8) | 76.6 (24.8) | 55.7 (13.2) | 44.7 (7.1) | 97.0 (36.1) |
| Mean daily maximum °F (°C) | 29.8 (−1.2) | 35.0 (1.7) | 45.5 (7.5) | 53.8 (12.1) | 64.0 (17.8) | 71.3 (21.8) | 82.0 (27.8) | 81.8 (27.7) | 71.0 (21.7) | 55.4 (13.0) | 39.3 (4.1) | 29.1 (−1.6) | 54.8 (12.7) |
| Daily mean °F (°C) | 19.1 (−7.2) | 21.7 (−5.7) | 31.5 (−0.3) | 38.8 (3.8) | 46.9 (8.3) | 54.8 (12.7) | 61.3 (16.3) | 60.2 (15.7) | 51.5 (10.8) | 39.4 (4.1) | 27.7 (−2.4) | 18.9 (−7.3) | 39.3 (4.1) |
| Mean daily minimum °F (°C) | 8.3 (−13.2) | 8.5 (−13.1) | 17.5 (−8.1) | 23.8 (−4.6) | 29.9 (−1.2) | 38.3 (3.5) | 40.6 (4.8) | 38.7 (3.7) | 32.0 (0.0) | 23.4 (−4.8) | 16.2 (−8.8) | 8.7 (−12.9) | 23.8 (−4.6) |
| Mean minimum °F (°C) | −17.6 (−27.6) | −13.5 (−25.3) | 1.0 (−17.2) | 13.6 (−10.2) | 18.9 (−7.3) | 28.2 (−2.1) | 32.6 (0.3) | 29.8 (−1.2) | 22.0 (−5.6) | 6.3 (−14.3) | −0.6 (−18.1) | −13.2 (−25.1) | −27.4 (−33.0) |
| Record low °F (°C) | −47 (−44) | −45 (−43) | −37 (−38) | −4 (−20) | 13 (−11) | 23 (−5) | 24 (−4) | 22 (−6) | 10 (−12) | −21 (−29) | −23 (−31) | −50 (−46) | −50 (−46) |
| Average precipitation inches (mm) | 1.38 (35) | 1.03 (26) | 0.76 (19) | 1.13 (29) | 1.86 (47) | 2.16 (55) | 0.83 (21) | 0.62 (16) | 0.91 (23) | 1.46 (37) | 1.55 (39) | 1.41 (36) | 15.10 (384) |
| Average snowfall inches (cm) | 15.5 (39) | 7.2 (18) | 4.6 (12) | 1.3 (3.3) | 0.4 (1.0) | 0.0 (0.0) | 0.0 (0.0) | 0.0 (0.0) | 0.2 (0.51) | 1.9 (4.8) | 7.4 (19) | 13.3 (34) | 51.8 (131.61) |
| Average extreme snow depth inches (cm) | 11.1 (28) | 11.5 (29) | 9.5 (24) | 1.5 (3.8) | 0.2 (0.51) | 0.0 (0.0) | 0.0 (0.0) | 0.0 (0.0) | 0.1 (0.25) | 0.5 (1.3) | 3.8 (9.7) | 10.6 (27) | 16.8 (43) |
| Average precipitation days (≥ 0.01 in) | 8.0 | 5.9 | 5.6 | 5.6 | 8.0 | 9.5 | 5.4 | 3.9 | 5.4 | 7.0 | 8.0 | 8.2 | 80.5 |
| Average snowy days (≥ 0.1 in) | 5.6 | 4.8 | 2.8 | 0.7 | 0.1 | 0.0 | 0.0 | 0.0 | 0.1 | 0.8 | 2.9 | 6.5 | 24.3 |
Source 1: NOAA
Source 2: National Weather Service

== Demographics ==
Historical population
| Census | Pop. | Note | %± |
|---|---|---|---|
| 2020 | 26 | | — |
U.S. Decennial Census

== Media ==
The Seeley-Swan Pathfinder is the newspaper for Potomac. It is published weekly.

== Education ==
The school districts are Potomac Elementary School District and Missoula High School District.
