= Turah, Montana =

Unincorporated community in Montana, United States

- Census-designated place
- Location within Montana Location within the United States
- Coordinates: 46°50′23″N 113°49′30″W
- Country: United States
- State: Montana
- County: Missoula

Area
  - Total: 1.33 sq mi (3.45 km^{2})
  - Land: 1.33 sq mi (3.45 km^{2})
  - Water: 0 sq mi (0.00 km^{2})
- Elevation: 3,419 ft (1,042 m)

Population (2020)
  - Total: 364
  - Density: 272.9/sq mi (105.36/km^{2})
- Time zone: UTC-7 (Mountain (MST))
  - Summer (DST): UTC-6 (MDT)
- ZIP Codes: 59802 (Missoula); 59825 (Clinton)
- Area code: 406
- FIPS code: 30-75175
- GNIS feature ID: 2583860

Turah is an unincorporated community and census-designated place (CDP) in Missoula County, Montana, United States, along Interstate 90. It had a population of 364 as of the 2020 census, up from 306 in 2010.

== Geography ==
Turah is in eastern Missoula County, in the valley of the Clark Fork River. Interstate 90 passes through the community, with access from Exit 113. I-90 leads northwest 9 miles (14 km) to Missoula and southeast 39 miles (63 km) to Drummond.

According to the U.S. Census Bureau, the Turah CDP has an area of 1.33 square miles (3.4 km^{2}), all land. Turah Creek, a tributary of the Clark Fork, forms the southeast border of the community.

== Demographics ==
Historical population
Census	Pop.	Note	%±
2010	306		—
2020	364		19.0%
U.S. Decennial Census

== Education ==
Most of it is in the Clinton Elementary School District while a northern portion is in the Bonner Elementary School District. All of it is in the Missoula High School District.
