= Missoula County, Montana =

County in Montana, United States

- County
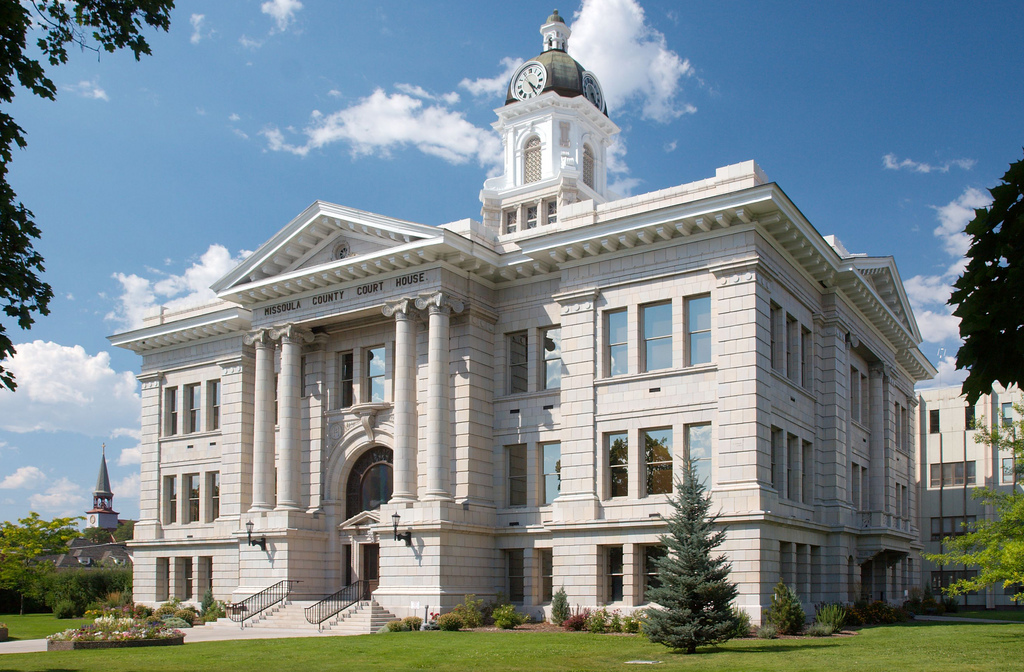
- Missoula County Courthouse

- Location within the U.S. state of Montana
- Coordinates: 47°02′N 113°56′W
- Country: United States
- State: Montana
- Founded: December 14, 1860
- Seat: Missoula
- Largest city: Missoula

Area
  - Total: 2,618 sq mi (6,780 km^{2})
  - Land: 2,593 sq mi (6,720 km^{2})
  - Water: 25 sq mi (65 km^{2}) 1.0%

Population (2020)
  - Total: 117,922
  - Estimate (2025): 123,513 ▲
  - Density: 45.48/sq mi (17.56/km^{2})
- Time zone: UTC−7 (Mountain)
  - Summer (DST): UTC−6 (MDT)
- Congressional district: 1st
- Website: www.missoulacounty.gov
- Montana county number 04

Missoula County (/mɪˈzuːlə/ miz-OO-lə) is a county located in the state of Montana. As of the 2020 census, the population was 117,922, making it Montana's third most populous county. Its county seat and most populous city is Missoula. The county was founded in 1860. Missoula County comprises the Missoula, MT Metropolitan Statistical Area, and is not a consolidated city-county.

== History ==
Missoula County was incorporated in 1860, when this area was still part of Washington Territory. Missoula County encompassed present-day Missoula and Deer Lodge Counties, as well as a large area of land north and south of present-day Missoula County. Hell Gate Town, the county seat, was at the confluence of the Clark Fork and Bitterroot Rivers.

The area encompassing today's Missoula County became part of the United States as a result of Oregon Treaty of June 14, 1846. It was part of the Oregon Territory's Clark County, which replaced the District of Vancouver September 3, 1844. The territory was divided on March 2, 1853, with Clark County becoming part of the new Washington Territory. Clark County was divided the next year to create Skamania County, which a month later was divided to create Walla Walla County, which was further divided in 1858 to create Spokane County. On December 14, 1860, Missoula County was carved out of Spokane County with the first county seat at Hell Gate. The county made up the region between modern-day Idaho and the Continental Divide north of the 46th parallel. When Idaho Territory was created in 1863 it adopted Missoula County as the territory's 3rd county on January 16, 1864, with more or less the same boundaries and Wordensville (present Missoula) established as the county seat. This first county consisted of all or part of current Ravalli, Missoula, Granite, Deer Lodge, Silver Bow, Powell, Mineral, Lake, Sanders, Lincoln, Flathead, and Glacier Counties.

Missoula County became a part of Montana Territory when the territory was organized out of the existing Idaho Territory by Act of Congress and signed into law by President Abraham Lincoln on May 26, 1864. At this time Deer Lodge County (today Deer Lodge, Granite, Silver Bow, and Powell Counties) was cut out of Missoula. The creation of Flathead (today Flathead and Lincoln Counties) and Ravalli Counties in 1893, Powell in 1901, Sanders in 1905, Mineral in 1914 and finally Lake County in 1923 gave Missoula its present borders.

== Geography ==
According to the United States Census Bureau, the county has a total area of 2,618 square miles (6,780 km^{2}), of which 2,593 square miles (6,720 km^{2}) is land and 25 square miles (65 km^{2}) (1.0%) is water. It is the 24th largest county in Montana.

=== Geographic features ===
Five large valleys and two major rivers wind through this mountainous region.

=== Flora and fauna ===
Located in the Northern Rockies, Missoula County has a typical Rocky Mountain ecology. Local wildlife includes white-tailed deer, black bears, osprey, and bald eagles. During the winter months, rapid snow melt on Mount Jumbo due to its steep slope leaves grass available for grazing elk and mule deer. The rivers around Missoula provide nesting habitats for bank swallows, northern rough-winged swallows and belted kingfishers. Killdeer and spotted sandpipers can be seen foraging insects along the gravel bars. Other species include song sparrows, catbirds, several species of warblers, and the pileated woodpecker. The rivers also provide cold, clean water for native fish such as westslope cutthroat trout and bull trout. The meandering streams also attract beaver and wood ducks.

Native riparian plant life includes sandbar willows and cottonwoods, and Montana's state tree, the ponderosa pine. Other native plants include wetland species such as cattails and beaked-sedge as well as shrubs and berry plants like Douglas hawthorn, chokecherry, and western snowberries. Missoula is also home to several noxious weeds which multiple programs have tried to eliminate. Notable ones include Dalmatian toadflax, spotted knapweed, leafy spurge, St. John's wort, and sulfur cinquefoil. The Norway maples that line many of Missoula's older streets have also been declared an invasive species.

=== Climate ===
Missoula County has a semi-arid climate (Köppen climate classification BSk), with cold and moderately snowy winters, hot and dry summers, and spring and autumn are short and crisp in between. Winter conditions are usually far milder than much of the rest of the state due to its western position within the state. However, the mildness is also induced by the dampness, as unlike much of the rest of the state, precipitation is not at a strong minimum during winter. Winter snowfall averages 43 inches (109 cm), with most years seeing very little of it from April to October. Summers see very sunny conditions, with highs peaking at 84 °F (28.9 °C) in July. However, temperature differences between day and night are large during this time and from April to October, due to the relative aridity.

Climate data for Missoula, Montana (Missoula Airport)
Month	Jan	Feb	Mar	Apr	May	Jun	Jul	Aug	Sep	Oct	Nov	Dec	Year
Record high °F (°C)	60 (16)	66 (19)	78 (26)	90 (32)	95 (35)	102 (39)	107 (42)	105 (41)	99 (37)	85 (29)	73 (23)	60 (16)	107 (42)
Mean daily maximum °F (°C)	33.2 (0.7)	38.8 (3.8)	49.8 (9.9)	58.5 (14.7)	67.3 (19.6)	75.2 (24.0)	85.9 (29.9)	84.9 (29.4)	73.1 (22.8)	57.8 (14.3)	41.5 (5.3)	31.0 (−0.6)	58.2 (14.6)
Mean daily minimum °F (°C)	18.3 (−7.6)	21.2 (−6.0)	27.7 (−2.4)	32.8 (0.4)	39.8 (4.3)	46.6 (8.1)	51.4 (10.8)	50.1 (10.1)	41.8 (5.4)	32.4 (0.2)	24.9 (−3.9)	16.7 (−8.5)	33.7 (0.9)
Record low °F (°C)	−33 (−36)	−28 (−33)	−13 (−25)	2 (−17)	21 (−6)	26 (−3)	31 (−1)	29 (−2)	15 (−9)	−4 (−20)	−23 (−31)	−30 (−34)	−33 (−36)
Average precipitation inches (mm)	0.85 (22)	0.70 (18)	1.00 (25)	1.22 (31)	2.01 (51)	2.07 (53)	0.99 (25)	1.19 (30)	1.17 (30)	0.88 (22)	1.01 (26)	1.04 (26)	14.13 (359)
Average snowfall inches (cm)	8.3 (21)	6.1 (15)	5.1 (13)	1.2 (3.0)	0.2 (0.51)	—	0.0 (0.0)	0.0 (0.0)	—	0.6 (1.5)	5.4 (14)	11.0 (28)	37.9 (96)
Average precipitation days (≥ 0.01 in)	11.8	9.4	11.4	11.1	12.3	12.1	7.1	7.5	8.2	8.4	11.1	12.3	122.7
Average snowy days (≥ 0.1 in)	9.4	6.8	5.1	1.6	0.3	0.1	0.0	0.0	0.0	0.9	5.4	9.8	39.4
Average relative humidity (%)	81.3	78.1	70.3	61.2	61.7	61.1	51.7	52.5	62.8	70.8	80.2	83.5	67.9
Mean monthly sunshine hours	95.8	133.0	209.3	245.0	280.5	311.1	389.3	334.8	264.7	194.3	99.5	82.9	2,640.2
Percentage possible sunshine	34	46	57	60	60	66	81	76	70	58	35	31	59
Source: NOAA (normals 1981−2010, relative humidity and sun 1961–1990)

=== National protected areas ===
- Bitterroot National Forest (part)
- Flathead National Forest (part)
- Lolo National Forest (part)
- Rattlesnake National Recreation Area

=== Major highways ===
- Interstate 90
- U.S. Highway 12
- U.S. Highway 93
- Montana Highway 83
- Montana Highway 200

=== Transit ===
- Jefferson Lines
- Mountain Line

=== Adjacent counties ===
- Mineral County - west
- Sanders County - northwest
- Lake County - north
- Flathead County - northeast
- Powell County - east
- Granite County - southeast
- Ravalli County - south
- Idaho County, Idaho - southwest/Pacific Time Border
- Clearwater County, Idaho - southwest/Pacific Time Border

== Demographics ==
Historical population
Census	Pop.	Note	%±
1870	2,554		—
1880	2,537		−0.7%
1890	14,427		468.7%
1900	13,964		−3.2%
1910	23,596		69.0%
1920	24,041		1.9%
1930	21,782		−9.4%
1940	29,038		33.3%
1950	35,493		22.2%
1960	44,663		25.8%
1970	58,263		30.5%
1980	76,016		30.5%
1990	78,687		3.5%
2000	95,802		21.8%
2010	109,426		14.2%
2020	117,922		7.8%
2025 (est.)	123,513	▲	4.7%
U.S. Decennial Census; 1790–1960, 1900–1990, 1990–2000, 2010–2020

=== 2020 census ===
As of the 2020 census, the county had a population of 117,922. Of the residents, 19.4% were under the age of 18 and 17.4% were 65 years of age or older; the median age was 37.7 years. For every 100 females there were 98.3 males, and for every 100 females age 18 and over there were 96.6 males. 74.7% of residents lived in urban areas and 25.3% lived in rural areas.

The racial makeup of the county was 86.1% White, 0.6% Black or African American, 2.8% American Indian and Alaska Native, 1.2% Asian, 2.2% from some other race, and 6.9% from two or more races. Hispanic or Latino residents of any race comprised 5.1% of the population.

There were 50,645 households in the county, of which 24.9% had children under the age of 18 living with them and 26.4% had a female householder with no spouse or partner present. About 31.8% of all households were made up of individuals and 11.6% had someone living alone who was 65 years of age or older.

There were 54,542 housing units, of which 7.1% were vacant. Among occupied housing units, 58.5% were owner-occupied and 41.5% were renter-occupied. The homeowner vacancy rate was 0.9% and the rental vacancy rate was 4.6%.

=== 2010 census ===
As of the 2010 census, there were 109,299 people, 45,926 households, and 25,931 families residing in the county. The population density was 42.1 inhabitants per square mile (16.3/km^{2}). There were 50,106 housing units at an average density of 19.3 per square mile (7.5/km^{2}). The racial makeup of the county was 92.7% white, 2.6% American Indian, 1.1% Asian, 0.4% black or African American, 0.1% Pacific islander, 0.4% from other races, and 2.6% from two or more races. Those of Hispanic or Latino origin made up 2.6% of the population. In terms of ancestry, 26.1% were German, 17.8% were Irish, 12.3% were English, 7.3% were Norwegian, and 5.4% were American.

Of the 45,926 households, 26.5% had children under the age of 18 living with them, 42.9% were married couples living together, 9.2% had a female householder with no husband present, 43.5% were non-families, and 30.3% of all households were made up of individuals. The average household size was 2.30 and the average family size was 2.88. The median age was 34.3 years.

The median income for a household in the county was $42,887 and the median income for a family was $58,302. Males had a median income of $39,603 versus $30,069 for females. The per capita income for the county was $24,343. About 8.8% of families and 17.3% of the population were below the poverty line, including 14.9% of those under age 18 and 8.8% of those age 65 or over.

== Economy ==
Missoula County has a diverse economy as a growing regional trade center with several major employers such as the University of Montana, regional hospitals, and the U.S. Forest Service each employing thousands. However, 90% of wage and salary workers work for small businesses with under 20 workers with a quarter of them self-employed.

== Government ==
Missoula County is governed by a Board of County Commissioners of three members, each serving six-year terms staggered so as to have one election every two years. The commission has authority over all legislative, executive, and administrative issues throughout the county not specifically reserved by law or ordinance to other elected officials.

== Politics ==
Originally a swing county, Missoula County has voted reliably Democratic since 2004, and has voted Republican only once since 1988. In 2000, Republican George W. Bush won the county by a 9% margin while Green Party candidate Ralph Nader received over 16% of the vote in the county. This is most likely due to the city of Missoula being home to the University of Montana.

United States presidential election results for Missoula County, Montana
Year	Republican		Democratic		Third party(ies)	
Year	No.	%	No.	%	No.	%
1892	2,045	39.82%	2,340	45.56%	751	14.62%
1896	365	13.88%	2,259	85.89%	6	0.23%
1900	1,392	41.85%	1,893	56.92%	41	1.23%
1904	2,239	59.90%	996	26.65%	503	13.46%
1908	1,856	46.15%	1,780	44.26%	386	9.60%
1912	589	12.64%	1,523	32.70%	2,546	54.66%
1916	2,926	38.69%	4,069	53.80%	568	7.51%
1920	4,374	52.61%	3,292	39.60%	648	7.79%
1924	2,386	29.44%	1,012	12.49%	4,706	58.07%
1928	5,056	59.71%	3,291	38.87%	120	1.42%
1932	3,819	39.72%	5,242	54.51%	555	5.77%
1936	2,697	24.97%	7,690	71.18%	416	3.85%
1940	5,640	41.66%	7,747	57.23%	150	1.11%
1944	5,371	48.70%	5,558	50.40%	99	0.90%
1948	6,426	46.32%	7,005	50.49%	442	3.19%
1952	10,053	58.99%	6,901	40.50%	87	0.51%
1956	10,627	61.12%	6,760	38.88%	0	0.00%
1960	10,396	53.76%	8,876	45.90%	65	0.34%
1964	8,065	38.40%	12,900	61.42%	39	0.19%
1968	9,745	48.02%	8,398	41.39%	2,149	10.59%
1972	15,557	51.77%	13,784	45.87%	708	2.36%
1976	16,350	51.36%	15,099	47.43%	388	1.22%
1980	16,161	46.72%	13,115	37.91%	5,318	15.37%
1984	19,777	53.54%	16,540	44.78%	620	1.68%
1988	15,965	44.76%	19,178	53.77%	526	1.47%
1992	12,898	29.79%	20,347	46.99%	10,054	23.22%
1996	16,034	36.13%	21,874	49.29%	6,474	14.59%
2000	21,474	46.11%	17,241	37.02%	7,861	16.88%
2004	23,989	45.73%	26,983	51.44%	1,482	2.83%
2008	20,743	34.99%	36,531	61.63%	2,003	3.38%
2012	22,652	39.58%	32,824	57.35%	1,756	3.07%
2016	22,250	36.64%	31,543	51.95%	6,929	11.41%
2020	26,347	36.85%	43,357	60.64%	1,795	2.51%
2024	27,306	37.52%	42,903	58.95%	2,564	3.52%

== Education ==
=== School districts ===
Missoula County is home to 18 school districts (13 Elementary, 2 Secondary, and 3 Unified).

K-12 (Unified) districts include:

- Alberton K-12 Schools
- Florence-Carlton K-12 Schools
- Frenchtown K-12 Schools

High school districts include:

- Arlee High School District
- Missoula High School District

Elementary school districts include:

- Arlee
- Bonner
- Clinton
- DeSmet
- Hellgate
- Lolo
- Missoula
- Potomac
- Seeley Lake
- Sunset
- Swan Valley
- Target Range
- Woodman

=== Colleges and universities ===
Missoula County is home to the University of Montana and the Missoula College - University of Montana.

== Communities ==
=== City ===
- Missoula (county seat)

=== Census-designated places ===
- Bonner-West Riverside
- Carlton
- Clinton
- Condon
- East Missoula
- Evaro
- Frenchtown
- Huson
- Lolo
- Orchard Homes
- Piltzville
- Potomac
- Seeley Lake
- Turah
- Twin Creeks
- Wye

=== Other unincorporated communities ===
- Clearwater
- Coloma
- Greenough
- Hell Gate
- Lolo Hot Springs
- Lothrop
- Milltown
- Nagos
- Ninemile
- Sunset
- Westview Park
- Yreka

== See also ==
- List of lakes in Missoula County, Montana
- List of mountains in Missoula County, Montana
- Milltown State Park
- National Register of Historic Places listings in Missoula County, Montana
