= Clinton, Montana =

- Census-designated place
- Location in Missoula County and the state of Montana
- Coordinates: 46°46′33″N 113°43′54″W
- Country: United States
- State: Montana
- County: Missoula

Area
  - Total: 3.36 sq mi (8.71 km^{2})
  - Land: 3.27 sq mi (8.47 km^{2})
  - Water: 0.093 sq mi (0.24 km^{2})
- Elevation: 3,458 ft (1,054 m)

Population (2020)
  - Total: 1,018
  - Density: 311.1/sq mi (120.13/km^{2})
- Time zone: UTC-7 (Mountain (MST))
  - Summer (DST): UTC-6 (MDT)
- ZIP code: 59825
- Area code: 406
- FIPS code: 30-15475
- GNIS feature ID: 2407636

Clinton is an unincorporated community and census-designated place (CDP) in Missoula County, Montana, United States. It is part of the Missoula metropolitan area. The population was 1,018 at the 2020 census.

Originally established in 1883 as a stage stop and post office with the name "Betters' Station", the town name was changed in 1892 to honor C. L. Clinton, an official of the Northern Pacific Railroad.

== Geography ==
Clinton is located in southeastern Missoula County in the valley of the Clark Fork River, which flows northwest 17 miles (27 km) to Missoula, the county seat. Interstate 90 passes through Clinton, with access from Exit 120. I-90 leads northwest to Missoula and southeast 63 miles (101 km) to Deer Lodge.

The Clark Fork forms the southwestern edge of the community and is joined from the east by Starvation Creek, Wallace Creek, and Dirty Ike Creek within the bounds of the CDP.

According to the U.S. Census Bureau, the Clinton CDP has a total area of 3.4 square miles (8.8 km^{2}), of which 0.1 square miles (0.3 km^{2}), or 2.73%, are water.

== Demographics ==
Historical population
Census	Pop.	Note	%±
2000	549		—
2010	1,052		91.6%
2020	1,018		−3.2%
U.S. Decennial Census

As of the census of 2010, there were 1,052 people, 204 households, and 153 families residing in the CDP. The population density was 278.6 inhabitants per square mile (107.6/km^{2}). There were 216 housing units at an average density of 109.6 per square mile (42.3/km^{2}). The racial makeup of the CDP was 95.81% White, 0.36% African American, 1.64% Native American, 0.18% Asian, and 2.00% from two or more races. Hispanic or Latino of any race were 0.36% of the population.

There were 204 households, out of which 39.7% had children under the age of 18 living with them, 55.9% were married couples living together, 12.3% had a female householder with no husband present, and 25.0% were non-families. 20.6% of all households were made up of individuals, and 3.4% had someone living alone who was 65 years of age or older. The average household size was 2.69 and the average family size was 3.07.

In the CDP, the population was spread out, with 30.4% under the age of 18, 7.1% from 18 to 24, 33.0% from 25 to 44, 22.4% from 45 to 64, and 7.1% who were 65 years of age or older. The median age was 33 years. For every 100 females, there were 101.8 males. For every 100 females age 18 and over, there were 100.0 males.

The median income for a household in the CDP was $31,731, and the median income for a family was $32,188. Males had a median income of $29,643 versus $22,500 for females. The per capita income for the CDP was $12,510. About 16.0% of families and 19.2% of the population were below the poverty line, including 28.3% of those under age 18 and 20.7% of those age 65 or over.

== Education ==
It is in the Clinton Elementary School District and the Missoula High School District.

== See also ==
- Testicle Festival
