= Milltown, Montana =

Unincorporated community in Montana, United States

- Unincorporated community
- Location within Montana Location within the United States
- Coordinates: 46°52′17″N 113°52′54″W
- Country: United States
- State: Montana
- County: Missoula
- Elevation: 3,288 ft (1,002 m)
- Time zone: UTC-7 (Mountain (MST))
  - Summer (DST): UTC-6 (MDT)
- ZIP code: 59851
- Area code: 406
- GNIS feature ID: 787441

Milltown is an unincorporated community in Missoula County, Montana, United States. Milltown is located along Interstate 90 and Montana Highway 200, 5.5 miles (8.9 km) east of downtown Missoula, on a hill overlooking the point where the Clark Fork and Big Blackfoot rivers meet. The community has a post office, with ZIP code 59851.

Originally named Riverside, Milltown began with the nearby mill in 1886. Unlike neighboring Bonner, which was the company town with company store and housing for mill managers and supervisors, Milltown formed organically a half mile up the river for mill workers and other support businesses.
