= List of secondary highways in Montana =

Montana Secondary Highways
- Highway marker for S-236 and S-323

System information
- Maintained by MDT
- Formed: 1942

Highway names
- Interstates: Interstate n (I-n)
- US Highways: U.S. Highway n (US n)
- State: Montana Highway n (MT n)
- Secondary: Secondary Highway n (S-n)

System links
- Montana Highway System; Interstate; US; State; Secondary

The secondary highway system is a lower-level classification of state highway maintained by the Montana Department of Transportation (MDT) in the US state of Montana. Secondary highways first appeared on the state highway map in 1960, even though the secondary system was established in 1942. With very few exceptions, notably MT 287 and the former MT 789, Montana state highways numbered 201 and higher are secondary highways.

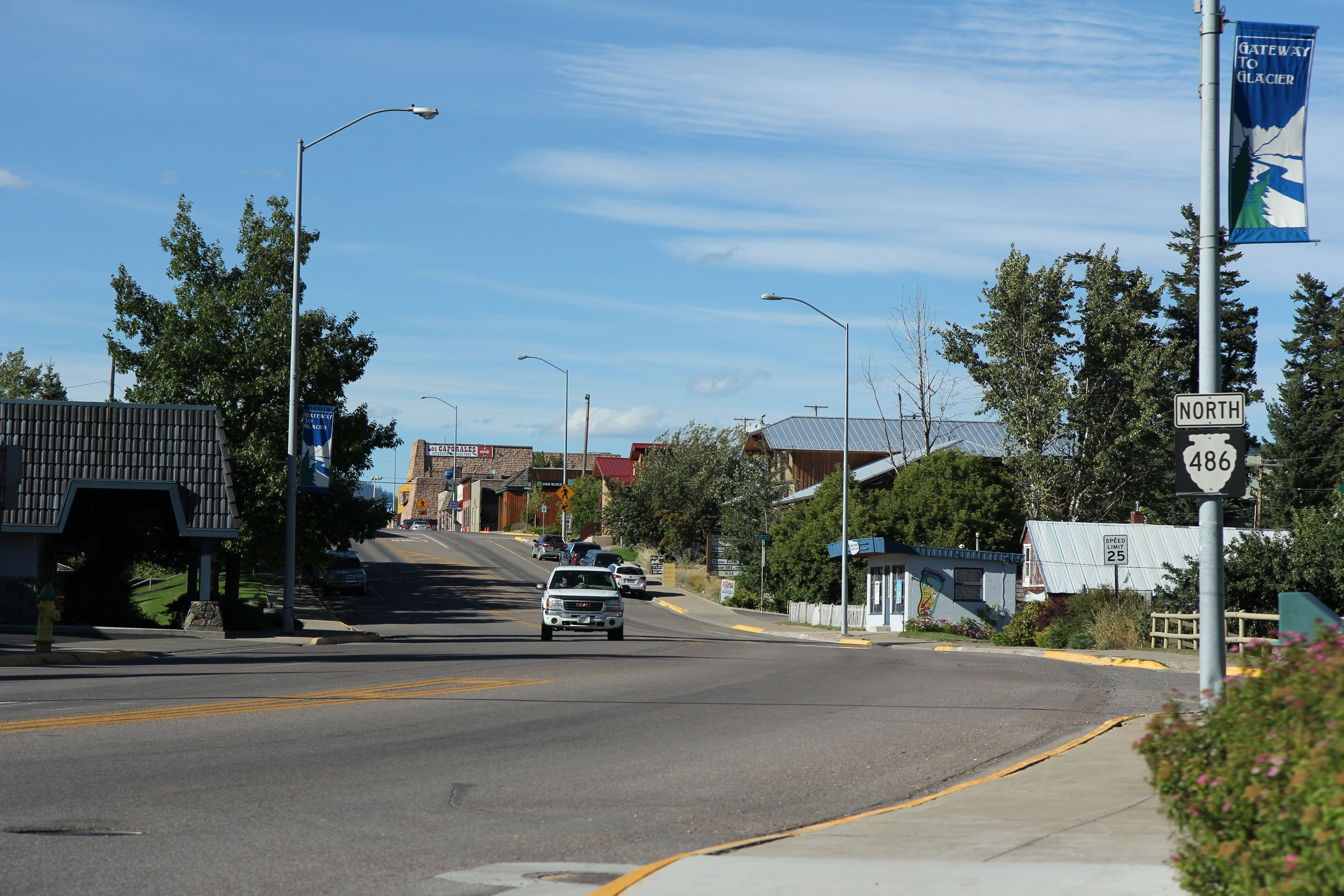
North on S-486 in Columbia Falls, August 2013

The highway markers for Montana's secondary highways are distinctive in that the route number appears in black on a white downward-pointing arrowhead. Early markers were white numbers on black arrowheads with the word Montana in the flat top of the inverted arrowhead and Secondary appearing below the route number on the shields.

== List of highways ==
Number	Length (mi)	Length (km)	Southern or western terminus	Northern or eastern terminus	Formed	Removed	Notes
S-201	69.511	111.867	MT 13 near Vida	MT 200 in Fairview	1952	current	
S-202	34.646	55.757	MT 200 west of Noxon	US 2 east of Troy	1945	1977	Replaced by MT 56
S-202	2.662	4.284	MT 23 near Sidney	McKenzie County Route 38 near Sidney	1977	current	
S-203	11.983	19.285	S-269 north of Stevensville	US 93 in Florence	1952	current	
S-204	1.596	2.569	Milk River near Dodson	US 2 in Dodson	1952	current	
S-205	—	—	Upper Lynch Creek Road north of Plains	US 10 Alternate (now MT 200) in Plains	1945	1945	
S-205	24.361	39.205	I-90 at Three Forks	S-411 near Bozeman	1976	current	
S-206	9.741	15.677	MT 35 east of Evergreen	US 2 near Columbia Falls	1945	current	
S-207	—	—	S-208	US 93 in Kalispell	1945	1977	Now Lower Valley Road
S-207	21.862	35.183	US 87/MT 3/MT 200 near Moccasin	MT 81 in Denton	1978	current	
S-208	—	—	US 93 north of Somers	MT 35 north of Bigfork	1945	1977	Replaced by MT 82
S-208	9.412	15.147	US 191 in Phillips County	Whitewater	1978	current	
S-209	4.861	7.823	MT 35 at Bigfork	MT 83 near Ferndale	1945	current	Partially replaced by MT 83 in 1977
S-210	9.855	15.860	MT 200 at Missoula	I-90/US 12 at Clinton	1976	current	Former U.S. 10
S-211	9.757	15.702	Flathead River near Ronan	US 93 in Ronan	1945	current	Round Butte Road
S-212	17.285	27.818	MT 200 near Dixon	US 93 near Charlo	1945	current	
S-213	39.513	63.590	US 2 in Cut Bank	Hwy 62 at the Port of Del Bonita	1945	current	
S-214	32.828	52.832	S-213 near Cut Bank	I-15 at Sweet Grass	1945	current	
S-215	21.299	34.277	S-213 near Cut Bank	I-15 near Oilmont	1945	current	
S-216	—	—	I-15 near Valier	US 89	1945	1977	Replaced by MT 44
S-216	—	—	Marysville	S-279 in Silver City	1981	1993	Now Marysville Road
S-217	—	—	US 89 in Dupuyer	US 91 in Conrad	1945	1945	now S-534
S-217	14.087	22.671	S-343 near Whitlash	S-409 at Whitlash	1976	current	
S-218	29.253	47.078	I-15 Bus in Conrad	S-225 near Tiber Dam	1945	current	
S-219	19.818	31.894	US 89 near Pendroy	I-15 Bus near Conrad	1945	current	
S-220	17.940	28.872	S-221 near Choteau	S-219 east of Pendroy	1945	current	
S-221	24.444	39.339	US 89 at Choteau	I-15/S-379 near Dutton	1945	current	
S-222	—	—	—	—	1945	1945	
S-222	3.589	5.776	I-15/S-278 south of Dillon	I-15 Bus. at Dillon	1976	current	
S-223	52.901	85.136	US 87/MT 80 near Fort Benton	US 2 in Chester	1945	current	
S-224	18.950	30.497	US 2 near Joplin	1200 Road S near Whitlash	1945	current	
S-225	56.220	90.477	US 87 in Great Falls	S-366 near Tiber Dam	1945	current	
S-226	14.560	23.432	Eden	US 87/US 89/MT 3 in Great Falls	1945	current	
S-227	16.756	26.966	S-226 near Eden	US 87/US 89/MT 3/MT 200 near Great Falls	1945	current	
S-228	42.633	68.611	US 87/US 89/MT 3/MT 200 near Great Falls	MT 80 near Fort Benton	1945	current	
S-229	—	—	—	—	1945	1954	
S-229	2.592	4.171	Helena city limits	S-279 near Helena	1976	current	
S-230	—	—	US 87 at Stanford	US 87 at Fort Benton	1945	1977	Not built until 1945; replaced by MT 80
S-230	—	—	East of Laurel	S-429 (Shiloh Road) in Billings	1982	1993	I-90 south frontage road
S-231	—	—	US 2 in Rudyard	Goldstone	1945	1977	Restored as S-255 in 1984
S-231	5.674	9.131	US 12 in Helena	S-279 near Helena	1983	current	
S-232	42.784	68.854	US 2 in Havre	Hwy 41 at the Port of Wild Horse, Alberta	1945	current	
S-233	30.482	49.056	S-232 near Havre	Hwy 21 at the Port of Willow Creek	1945	current	
S-234	21.662	34.862	Rocky Boys Indian Reservation	US 2 in Havre	1945	current	
S-235	—	—	S-230 near Coffee Creek	US 191 at Brooks	1945	1977	Replaced by MT 81
S-235	5.610	9.028	MT 85 near Bozeman	S-412 in Bozeman	1983	current	
S-236	88.235	142.000	US 191 at Hilger	US 87 at Big Sandy	1945	current	
S-237	2.478	3.988	S-426 near Hanover	US 87 Business/US 191 Business at Lewistown	1945	current	
S-238	68.888	110.864	US 2 in Ryegate	US 89/MT 200 in Lewistown	1945	current	
S-239	11.666	18.775	Utica	US 87/MT 3/MT 200 in Hobson	1945	current	
S-240	25.333	40.770	Cleveland	US 2 in Chinook	1945	current	
S-241	43.220	69.556	US 2 at Harlem	Hwy 37 at the Port of Turner	1945	current	
S-242	—	—	Port of Morgan at the Saskatchewan border	Malta	1945	1993	Replaced by US 191
S-243	21.185	34.094	US 2 near Bowdoin National Wildlife Refuge	US 2 in Saco	1945	current	
S-244	24.702	39.754	US-87 north of Roundup	MT 200 in Winnett	1945	current	
S-245	37.826	60.875	Brusett	MT 200 in Jordan	1945	current	
S-246	11.548	18.585	Tampico	MT 42 in Glasgow	1945	current	
S-247	—	—	Port of Opheim	US-2 in Glasgow	1945	1977	Replaced by MT 24
S-247	6.260	10.074	S-322 near Mill Iron	Webster	1983	current	
S-248	46.134	74.245	MT 24 in Opheim	MT 13 in Scobey	1945	current	Old route of MT 5
S-249	—	—	MT 24 at Fort Peck	US 2 at Nashua	1945	1977	Replaced by MT 117
S-249	11.775	18.950	MT 287 near Ennis	US 287 near Cameron	1984	current	
S-250	49.416	79.527	US 2 near Wolf Point	MT 13 near Volt	1945	current	
S-251	52.109	83.861	US 2 near Poplar	MT 5/S-511 near Flaxville	1945	current	
S-252	23.438	37.720	MT 200 near Circle	Horse Creek	1945	current	
S-253	46.913	75.499	I-94 in Terry	MT 200 in Brockway	1945	current	
S-254	67.705	108.961	MT 16 in Glendive	MT 13 near Vida	1945	current	
S-255	—	—	—	—	1945	—	
S-255	24.936	40.131	US 2 in Rudyard	Goldstone	1984	current	
S-256	—	—	MT 15 in Plentywood	Hwy 6 near Port of Raymond	1945	1977	Replaced by MT 16
S-257	5.772	9.289	I-90 in Superior	Trout Creek	1952	current	
S-258	19.800	31.865	MT 16 in Reserve	ND 50 at North Dakota border	1945	current	
S-259	—	—	—	—	1945	1954	
S-259	10.073	16.211	S-360 near White Sulphur Springs	US 89 at Newlan Creek	1984	current	
S-260	—	—	Lambert	MT 14/MT 16 in Sidney	1945	1950	Replaced by MT 23 (later MT 20; now MT 200)
S-260	3.577	5.757	Bobtail Road near Libby	S-567 near Libby	1986	current	
S-261	51.446	82.794	I-94 in Wibaux	MT 23 in Sidney	1945	current	Former MT 7
S-262	—	—	County Road southeast of St. Regis	S-257 in Superior	1945	1977	Now Diamond Road and Southside Road
S-263	14.786	23.796	I-90 in Frenchtown	US 93 in Missoula	1945	current	
S-264	—	—	S-266 in Missoula	S-265 in Missoula	1945	1974	Now 3rd Street and Clements Road
S-265	—	—	S-266 in Missoula	S-264 in Missoula	1945	1974	Now South Avenue
S-266	—	—	US 12 in Missoula	S-390 in Missoula	1945	1974	Now Higgins Avenue
S-267	—	—	Sawmill Gulch Road	MT 200 in Missoula	1945	1993	Now Van Buren Street and Rattlesnake Drive
S-268	—	—	—	—	1945	1977	
S-269	21.284	34.253	US 93/S-531 in Hamilton	US 93 in Stevensville	1945	current	
S-270	—	—	Capitol	S-323 in Albion	1953	1993	
S-271	22.319	35.919	I-90 in Drummond	MT 141 near Helmville	1945	current	Partially replaced by MT 141 in 1978
S-272	2.024	3.257	S-271 near Helmville	US 12 in Avon	1945	1977	Replaced by MT 141
S-272	2.024	3.257	Montana State Prison	S-275 in Deer Lodge	1987	current	
S-273	12.181	19.603	MT 48 near Opportunity	I-90 in Galen	1945	current	
S-274	—	—	MT 43 near Wise River	MT 1 near Opportunity	1945	1985	Restored in 2001 as S-569
S-275	—	—	—	—	1945	1977	
S-275	3.045	4.900	I-90 in Deer Lodge	I-90 near Deer Lodge	1987	current	
S-276	7.863	12.654	I-90 near Rocker	Rocker	1945	current	
S-277	33.556	54.003	US 212 in Hammond	S-323 near Ridgeway	1952	current	
S-278	61.092	98.318	MT 43 in Wisdom	I-15/S-222 in Dillon	1945	current	
S-279	38.965	62.708	I-15/US 287/S-453 in Helena	MT 200 near Flesher Pass	1945	current	
S-280	16.050	25.830	I-15 in Helena	Trout Creek Canyon	1945	current	
S-281	—	—	MT 2 at Cardwell	I-15 at Boulder	1945	1977	Replaced by MT 69
S-282	—	—	—	—	1945	1945	
S-282	3.575	5.753	Jack Mountain	I-15/S-518 near Montana City	1987	current	
S-283	6.434	10.355	Pony	US 287 in Harrison	1945	current	
S-284	42.073	67.710	US 12/US 287 near Canyon Ferry	US 12 near Townsend	1945	current	
S-285	9.371	15.081	Radersburg	US 287 in Toston	1945	current	
S-286	3.930	6.325	S-205 near Three Forks	Trident	1945	current	
S-287	7.931	12.764	MT 2 in Three Forks	Williams Bridge Road south of Willow Creek	1945	current	
S-288	16.176	26.033	S-347 in Amsterdam	I-90/S-346 in Manhattan	1945	current	
S-289	—	—	US 287 in Norris	US 191/S-291 near Four Corners	1945	1977	Replaced by MT 84
S-290	16.247	26.147	S-205 in Belgrade	16 Mile Creek near Maudlow	1945	current	
S-291	0.826	1.329	S-205 in Belgrade	I-90/MT 85 in Belgrade	1945	2001	Now Jackrabbit Lane; partially replaced by MT 85 in 1977
S-292	—	—	—	—	1945	1977	
S-292	8.789	14.145	S-548 in Evergreen	MT 40 near Whitefish	1996	current	
S-293	—	—	US 191/I-90 Bus. in Bozeman	US 89 near Wilsall	1945	1977	Replaced by MT 86
S-294	29.169	46.943	US 89 near Horse Butte	US 12 near Martinsdale	1945	current	
S-295	16.379	26.359	I-90 near Livingston	I-90 near Mission	1945	current	
S-296	—	—	US 12 in Two Dot	Lebo Lake	1945	1977	Now Two Dot Highway
S-297	37.818	60.862	US 12/MT 3 in Shawmut	MT 3 in Judith Gap	1945	current	
S-298	25.655	41.288	Boulder Ranger Station	US 191 in Big Timber	1945	current	
S-299	—	—	—	—	1945	1977	
S-300	13.341	21.470	Big Coolie Creek	US 12/MT 3/S-238 in Ryegate	1945	current	
S-301	—	—	MT 6 in Lavina	I-90 in Billings	1945	1956	Replaced by MT 3
S-302	14.322	23.049	Molt	MT 3 in Billings	1945	current	
S-303	—	—	—	—	1945	1977	
S-304	—	—	Shepherd	US 312	1945	1977	Now Shepherd Road
S-305	—	—	Laurel	S-302 in Billings	1945	1977	Now 72nd Street and S-532 (King Avenue)
S-306	25.273	40.673	MT 78 in Columbus	Rapelje	1945	current	
S-307	—	—	US 212 at Red Lodge	I-90 at Columbus	1945	1977	Replaced by MT 78
S-308	14.383	23.147	US 212 in Red Lodge	MT 72 in Belfry	1945	current	Partially replaced by MT 72
S-309	—	—	—	—	1945	1972	
S-310	41.348	66.543	I-94 in Custer	US 12 near Musselshell	1945	current	
S-311	25.915	41.706	S-310 in Myers	I-94 in Hysham	1945	current	
S-312	—	—	—	—	1945	1962	
S-313	38.588	62.101	Fort Smith	MT 47 in Hardin	1945	current	
S-314	44.342	71.362	WYO 338 near Decker	US 212 near Busby	1946	current	
S-315	—	—	US 212 in Lame Deer	North of I-94 near Forsyth	1945	1977	Replaced by MT 45
S-316	—	—	—	—	1945	1945	
S-317	3.503	5.638	US 93 in Kalispell	MT 35 in Kalispell	1953	c. 2012	
S-318	—	—	Swords Park	Billings Municipal Airport	1945	1974	Now East Airport Road
S-319	—	—	US 212 near Broadus	Wyoming border south of Biddle	1945	1967	Replaced by MT 59
S-320	6.070	9.769	US 12 near Plevna	Ismay	1945	current	
S-321	—	—	—	—	1945	1977	
S-322	26.908	43.304	Medicine Rocks	MT 7 near Baker	1945	current	
S-323	71.126	114.466	US 212/S-326 in Alzada	MT 7 in Ekalaka	1945	current	
S-324	34.429	55.408	SH 29 at Bannock Pass	I-15 near Clark Canyon Dam	1945	current	
S-325	13.353	21.490	US 2 in Chinook	North Chinook Reservoir	1946	current	
S-326	—	—	MT 35 in Bigfork	S-209 near Bigfork	1954	1977	Replaced by MT 83
S-326	1.683	2.709	WYO 112 near Alzada	US 212/S-323 in Alzada	1990	current	Formerly S-492
S-327	15.043	24.209	ND 1804 at Fort Union	US 2 Bainville	1953	current	
S-328	—	—	MT 3 in Broadview	MT 3 in Acton	1953	1977	Now 21 Mile Road and Oswald Road
S-328	18.843	30.325	S-323 near Ekalaka	SD 20 near Capitol	1994	current	
S-329	—	—	—	—	1945	1977	
S-330	36.924	59.423	MT 68 in Cascade	I-15 in Ulm	1945	current	
S-331	10.072	16.209	US 87/US 89 in Belt	S-228 near Highwood	1945	current	
S-332	50.391	81.096	S-447 near Brandenburg	MT 59 near Twelve Mile Dam	1945	current	
S-333	—	—	US 12 east of Miles City	Mizpah	1945	1983	Now Mizpah Road and Trail Creek Road
S-334	—	—	Port of Scobey	MT 5 in Scobey	1945	1962	Replaced by MT 13
S-334	3.760	6.051	Beaver Creek Reservoir	US 87 in Laredo	1994	current	
S-335	14.598	23.493	Balier Reservoir	I-94 in Glendive	1945	current	
S-336	14.595	23.488	MT 7 near Rush Hall	ND 16 near Carlyle	1945	current	
S-337	—	—	—	—	1956	1957	
S-338	21.558	34.694	S-241 near Harlem	Hogeland	1954	current	
S-339	—	—	US 89 near Wilsall	Smith Creek Road northeast of Wilsall	1954	1977	Now Shields River Road
S-340	18.501	29.774	Mildred	I-94 in Fallon	1954	current	
S-341	21.930	35.293	MT 200 near Jordan	Fort Peck Lake	1954	current	
S-342	0.859	1.382	US 212 near Crow Agency	Little Big Horn Battlefield	1954	current	
S-343	43.227	69.567	I-15/S-215 in Oilmont	US 2 near Galata	1954	current	
S-344	35.648	57.370	US 2 in Brockton	MT 16 in Froid	1954	current	
S-345	12.036	19.370	US 191 in Gallatin Gateway	Kagy Boulevard in Bozeman	1951	current	
S-346	7.975	12.835	I-90/S-288 in Manhattan	S-290 at Manhattan city limits	1946	current	
S-347	6.226	10.020	S-288 in Amsterdam	MT 85 in Belgrade	1945	current	
S-348	13.974	22.489	Gilles	MT 1 in Philipsburg	1945	current	
S-349	—	—	—	—	1954	1977	
S-350	5.487	8.830	Homestead	MT 16 near Medicine Lake	1954	current	
S-351	—	—	—	—	1945	1954	
S-352	5.093	8.196	US 93 in Dayton	Lake Mary Ronan	1945	current	
S-353	—	—	Round Butte	Moiese	1945	1977	
S-354	8.002	12.878	Polson	—	1945	current	
S-355	—	—	Helena	—	1954	1974	
S-356	—	—	US 12 in Helena	Central Avenue in Helena	1945	1977	Formerly ended at S-279 near Birdseye
S-357	26.800	43.130	Ruby River Reservoir	MT 287 in Alder	1945	current	
S-358	27.838	44.801	MT 44 in Valier	US 2 in Cut Bank	1954	current	
S-359	15.964	25.692	US 287 north of Harrison	MT 2/MT 69 northwest of Cardwell	1945	current	
S-360	18.217	29.317	Fort Logan	US 12/US 89 in White Sulphur Springs	1945	current	
S-361	—	—	—	—	1945	1947	
S-361	—	—	—	—	1975	1983	
S-362	—	—	—	—	1945	1977	now S-571
S-363	11.203	18.029	US 2 in Dodson	US 191 in Malta	1945	current	
S-364	—	—	US 191 in Malta	South Black Coulee Road near Malta	1945	1977	
S-365	24.231	38.996	Brady	S-225 near Carter	1945	current	
S-366	49.245	79.252	I-15 near Ledger	S-223 near Chester	1945	current	
S-367	—	—	—	—	1945	1977	
S-368	—	—	—	—	1945	1977	
S-369	—	—	—	—	1945	1977	
S-370	1.954	3.145	US 93 near Victor	S-203 near Stevensville	1945	current	
S-371	—	—	Melville	Twodot	1945	1977	
S-372	—	—	—	—	1945	1977	
S-373	4.529	7.289	US 93 in Woodside	Corvallis	1945	current	
S-374	6.503	10.466	MT 5 in Archer	Outlook	1945	current	
S-375	—	—	Continental Drive—downtown Butte	US 10 southeast of Butte	1945	1993	
S-376	—	—	Fort Belknap Agency	US 191 near Landusky	1956	1977	Replaced by MT 66
S-377	—	—	Stevensville	Bitterroot National Forest	1955	1977	
S-378	—	—	—	—	1945	1977	
S-379	18.008	28.981	I-15/S-221 near Dutton	S-225 near Carter	1945	current	
S-380	—	—	—	—	1955	1977	
S-381	16.370	26.345	Colding Creek	US 12 near Roundup	1945	current	
S-382	15.703	25.272	MT 28 near Hot Springs	MT 200 in Perma	1945	current	
S-384	—	—	—	—	1955	1977	
S-384	57.052	91.816	MT 47 in Hardin	I-94 near Sanders	1945	current	
S-385	—	—	—	—	1945	1977	
S-386	1.534	2.469	US 87 in Kershaw	MT 80 in Fort Benton	1945	current	
S-387	2.646	4.258	MT 80 in Fort Benton	US 87 in Loma	1945	current	
S-388	—	—	—	—	1955	1977	
S-389	—	—	—	—	1945	1977	
S-390	—	—	US 12 in Missoula	US 12 in Missoula	1945	1974	Now 39th Street and Russell Street
S-391	16.563	26.656	Yarger	US 212/MT 59 in Broadus	1945	current	
S-392	—	—	—	—	1945	1963	
S-393	6.594	10.612	Newcomb	MT 2 in Butte	1945	current	
S-394	—	—	—	—	1945	1977	
S-395	—	—	—	—	1946	1962	
S-396	16.908	27.211	S-211 in Harlem	Coburg	1946	current	Former routing of US 2
S-397	—	—	Belfry	Wyoming border	1945	1977	Replaced by MT 72
S-398	—	—	County road 4.7 mi (7.6 km) north of MT 48	MT 48 3 mi (4.8 km) east of Anaconda	1946	1956	Replaced by S-273
S-398	7.009	11.280	US 212/MT 59 in Broadus	Powderville	2000	current	Formerly S-402
S-399	25.228	40.601	I-90/MT 55 in Whitetail	MT 69 in Boulder	1946	current	
S-400	12.335	19.851	Buffalo	S-239 near Hobson	1946	current	
S-401	—	—	—	—	1946	1977	Replaced by MT 55
S-401	7.903	12.719	S-532 near Laurel	S-302 near Molt	1987	current	
S-402	7.009	11.280	US 212/MT 59 in Broadus	Powderville	1946	1987	Now S-398
S-403	—	—	—	—	1946	1974	
S-404	—	—	Brockton	—	1946	1977	
S-405	28.371	45.659	US 2 near Bainville	MT 16 in Froid	1946	current	
S-406	—	—	—	—	1946	1965	
S-407	—	—	—	—	1946	1977	
S-408	19.568	31.492	US 287 near Gilman	US 89 in Fairfield	1946	current	
S-409	40.499	65.177	US 2 in Chester	Hwy 880 near Whitlash	1946	current	
S-410	—	—	—	—	1946	1977	
S-411	10.744	17.291	S-205/S-570 in Bozeman	Springhill Cemetery	1946	current	
S-412	—	—	—	—	1947	1977	
S-412	0.349	0.562	S-411 near Bozeman	S-205 bridge in Bozeman	1995	current	
S-413	24.709	39.765	MT 7 near Carlyle	MT 7 near Saint Phillip	1948	current	
S-414	—	—	—	—	1948	1977	
S-415	—	—	—	—	1950	1977	
S-416	14.113	22.713	S-418 near Pryor	I-90/US 212 in Billings	1950	current	
S-417	16.530	26.602	S-366 near Ledger	US 2 near Shelby	1950	current	
S-418	—	—	—	—	1951	1977	
S-418	16.124	25.949	S-416 near Pryor	Pryor	2000	current	
S-419	21.254	34.205	Limestone	MT 78 near Absarokee	1951	current	
S-420	6.929	11.151	S-419 in Nye	MT 78 near Absarokee	1951	current	
S-421	18.167	29.237	MT 78 near Columbus	US 212 near Joliet	1951	current	
S-422	8.521	13.713	MT 41 in Silver Star	MT 55 near Waterloo	1951	current	
S-423	—	—	—	—	1951	1977	
S-424	17.108	27.533	US 93 in Kalispell	US 93 west of Whitefish	1951	current	
S-425	—	—	Roscoe	Fishtail	1951	1977	
S-426	26.573	42.765	US 87/MT 3/MT 200 near Kolin	US 191 in Lewistown	1951	current	
S-427	12.319	19.826	US 89 at Currie Spring	US 87/MT 3/MT 200 in Raynesford	1951	current	
S-428	—	—	US 191 in Judith Gap	Living Springs Road	1952	1977	Replaced by an extended S-297
S-428	—	—	Zoo Drive in Billings	S-429 (Shiloh Road) in Billings	1999	2001	I-90 south Frontage Road
S-429	6.392	10.287	Zoo Drive in Billings	S-428 (I-90 Frontage Road) in Billings	1952	2001	Now Shiloh Road
S-430	—	—	—	—	1955	1980	
S-430	3.802	6.119	S-280 in Helena	S-284 near Canyon Creek	1987	current	
S-431	19.999	32.185	US 89/S-565 near Fairfield	I-15 in Power	1955	current	
S-432	46.932	75.530	US 2 in Rudyard	US 287/S-223 in Big Sandy	1955	current	
S-433	—	—	—	—	1955	1977	
S-434	18.032	29.020	I-15 near Wolf Creek	MT 200 near Johnson Mountain	1955	current	
S-435	—	—	—	—	1955	1977	
S-435	15.361	24.721	US 287 in Augusta	Johnson Mountain	1987	current	
S-436	—	—	US 2 near Chinook	Saskatchewan border	1955	1977	Now local Blaine County roads
S-437	8.895	14.315	S-285 near Radersburg	US 287 Toston	1956	current	
S-438	52.465	84.434	US 2 in Nashua	S-248 nearGlentana	1955	current	
S-440	—	—	—	—	1955	1977	
S-441	7.829	12.600	I-90 near Gregson	MT 1 near Opportunity	1956	current	
S-444	19.773	31.822	US 2 near Blackfoot	S-213 near Bonita	1956	current	
S-445	—	—	—	—	1955	1977	
S-446	2.778	4.471	I-94/S-447 in Rosebud	Cartersville	1956	current	
S-447	52.478	84.455	US 212 in Ashland	I-94/S-446 in Rosebud	1956	current	
S-448	30.108	48.454	US 87 in Box Elder	US 2/S-449 Gildford	1955	current	
S-449	16.590	26.699	US 2/S-448 in Gildford	Milk River	1955	current	
S-450	—	—	—	—	1955	1977	
S-451	—	—	—	—	1955	1960	
S-451	38.047	61.231	WYO 345 south of Wyola	I-90/US 87 north of Wyola	1988	current	Formerly US 87
S-452	—	—	—	—	1955	1977	
S-453	5.121	8.241	I-15/US 287/S-279 in Helena	Lake Helena	1955	current	
S-454	3.330	5.359	Unionville	US 12 in Helena	1955	current	
S-455	—	—	—	—	1956	1957	
S-456	—	—	—	—	1955	1977	
S-457	—	—	—	—	1955	1970	
S-457	1.506	2.424	S-451 in Wyola	I-90/US 87 near Wyola	1988	current	
S-458	—	—	—	—	1956	1977	
S-459	—	—	Great Falls	S-226	1956	1993	
S-460	—	—	—	—	1956	1977	
S-461	—	—	MT 200 near Paradise	St. Regis	1956	1977	Replaced by MT 135
S-462	38.464	61.902	MT 59 in Rock Springs	MT 200 near Brockway	1956	current	
S-463	14.202	22.856	Willow Creek Dam	I-90 in Lodge Grass	1957	current	
S-464	33.671	54.188	US 2/US 89 in Browning	US 89 in Babb	1957	current	
S-465	—	—	—	—	1956	1977	
S-466	2.160	3.476	Hansons Creek Road near Lewistown	S-238 near Lewistown	1956	current	
S-467	31.745	51.089	MT 200S in Lindsay	MT 200 in Circle	1957	current	
S-468	—	—	—	—	1957	1958	
S-469	—	—	—	—	1956	1985	
S-470	24.032	38.676	MT 200S in Lindsay	S-254 in Bloomfield	1957	current	
S-471	22.069	35.517	NFS Route 9 at Idaho border near Murray, Idaho	MT 200 near Thompson Falls, Montana	1957	current	
S-472	—	—	—	—	1956	1977	
S-472	16.5	26.6	US 93 in Sula	Reynolds Creek Road near Martin Creek Campground	1993	current	
S-473	14.394	23.165	Painted Rocks State Park	US 93 near Conner	1957	current	
S-474	3.859	6.210	S-263 near Frenchtown	I-90/US 93/MT 200 in Wye	1957	current	
S-475	—	—	—	—	1956	1977	
S-476	—	—	S-540 near Pray	Montanapolis Springs	1956	1977	
S-477	—	—	—	—	1956	1977	
S-478	21.995	35.398	US 191 near Big Timber	Stephens Hill Road near Rapelje	1957	current	
S-479	—	—	—	—	1956	1977	
S-480	19.696	31.698	S-201 near Richey	US 2 in Sprole	1957	current	
S-481	—	—	—	—	1957	1977	
S-482	7.176	11.549	US 2 near Libby Creek	US 2 near Libby	1958	current	
S-483	—	—	Port of Del Bonita	Santa Rita	1957	1977	Replaced by an extension of S-213
S-484	27.863	44.841	Fort Howe	US 212 near Ashland	1958	current	
S-485	—	—	Trailcreek	Columbia Falls	1958	1977	
S-486	22.646	36.445	US 2 in Columbia Falls	Camas Creek entrance of Glacier National Park	1958	current	
S-487	7.223	11.624	US 93 in Whitefish	Whitefish Mountain Resort at Big Mountain	1958	current	
S-488	—	—	—	—	1959	1981	
S-489	18.006	28.978	MT 59 near Miles City	Kinsey	1985	current	
S-490	—	—	—	—	1959	1977	
S-492	—	—	—	—	1959	1977	
S-493	4.877	7.849	MT 7 near Baker	Anticline Road near Plevna	1959	current	
S-494	22.743	36.601	MT 7 in Willard	US 12 in Plevna	1959	current	
S-495	—	—	Great Falls	—	1959	1977	
S-496	—	—	Bainville	MT 16	1959	1977	
S-497	—	—	—	—	1959	1977	
S-498	—	—	In Great Falls	—	1959	1974	Replaced by bypass US 87
S-499	—	—	Follows the north end of Hebgen Lake from MT 287	US 191	1959	1964	Replaced by US 287 in 1964
S-500	30.407	48.935	US 12 near Melstone	MT 200 in Mosby	1960	current	
S-501	—	—	MT 38 at Grantsdale	Sleeping Child Hot Springs	1960	1977	
S-502	—	—	—	—	1960	1977	
S-503	12.166	19.579	US 93A near Kalispell	US 2 in Kalispell	1960	current	
S-504	12.847	20.675	S-340 in Marsh	Cabin Creek	1960	current	
S-505	—	—	Lewistown	Glengarry	1960	1980	replaced by S-426
S-506	—	—	Yaak	Libby	1961	1977	Replaced by S-567
S-507	2.533	4.076	I-90 in Alberton	I-90 near Huson	1961	current	
S-508	29.272	47.109	US 2 near Troy	S-567 in Yaak	1961	current	
S-509	37.499	60.349	I-15 in Monida	Red Rock Lakes National Wildlife Refuge	1961	current	
S-510	—	—	Brockway	Dry Ash Creek	1961	1999	
S-511	13.790	22.193	MT 5/S-251 in Flaxville	Whitetail	1962	current	Formerly MT 13; formerly ended at Port of Whitetail
S-512	13.790	22.193	MT 1/S-513 in Hall	New Chicago Road near Hall	1962	current	
S-513	9.663	15.551	Lower Willow Creek Road near Hall	MT 1/S-512 in Hall	1962	current	
S-514	—	—	Poplar	Plentywood	1962	1977	
S-515	—	—	US 2	Katy Lake	1961	1977	part now S-573
S-515	—	—	—	—	1991	2001	
S-516	—	—	—	—	—	—	
S-516	6.008	9.669	S-258 near Dagmar	S-517 in Coalridge	1961	current	
S-517	12.291	19.780	MT 16 near Antelope	S-516 in Coalridge	1961	current	
S-518	4.468	7.191	I-15/S-282 in Montana City	US 12/US 287 in East Helena	1961	current	
S-519	—	—	—	—	1962	1978	
S-520	—	—	—	—	1962	1977	
S-521	—	—	—	—	1962	1972	
S-522	2.368	3.811	I-94 in Huntley	Worden	1962	current	
S-523	—	—	—	—	1963	1977	
S-524	—	—	—	—	1962	1977	
S-525	—	—	—	—	1962	1977	
S-526	—	—	—	—	1963	1977	
S-527	—	—	—	—	1963	1977	
S-528	18.703	30.100	Prairie Elk Road near Oswego	MT 13 near Macon	1998	current	
S-529	9.959	16.027	Clear Creek Road near Chinook	S-240 in Chinook	1963	current	
S-530	—	—	—	—	1963	1977	
S-531	6.308	10.152	US 93 in Grantsdale	US 93/S-269 in Hamilton	1963	current	
S-532	17.628	28.370	I-90/US 212/US 310 in Laurel	I-90/US 212 in Billings	1964	current	
S-533	—	—	—	—	1965	2005	
S-534	27.894	44.891	US 89 in Dupuyer	S-218 in Conrad	1964	current	
S-535	—	—	—	—	1964	1974	
S-536	—	—	—	—	1964	1993	
S-537	23.126	37.218	US 2 in Hinsdale	Snake Creek Road near Hinsdale	1965	current	
S-538	—	—	—	—	1965	1974	
S-539	—	—	—	—	1965	1977	
S-540	31.859	51.272	US 89 near Miner	US 89 near Pine Creek	1966	current	
S-541	10.691	17.205	S-239 Utica	US 87/MT 3/MT 200 in Windham	1966	current	
S-542	—	—	—	—	1967	1977	
S-543	24.160	38.882	MT 200 in Jordan	Hell Creek State Park	1967	current	
S-544	32.937	53.007	MT 59 in Biddle	US 212 in Boyes	1968	current	
S-545	—	—	—	—	1968	1974	
S-546	—	—	—	—	1968	1977	
S-547	6.477	10.424	MT 81 in Denton	Bear Springs Road near Denton	1969	current	
S-548	6.521	10.495	US 93 near Whitefish	US 2 in Kalispell	1969	current	
S-549	—	—	—	—	1969	1993	
S-551	6.515	10.485	US 87/MT 3/MT 200 in Geyser	Braun Creek Road near Geyser	1971	current	
S-552	33.090	53.253	I-15 at Sunburst	S-343 near Whitlash	1973	current	
S-554	—	—	—	—	1971	1977	
S-556	44.200	71.133	MT 200 near Snider	US 2 near Happy's Inn	1971	current	
S-557	—	—	—	—	1971	1974	
S-558	—	—	—	—	1971	1974	
S-559	3.118	5.018	US 93/MT 200 near Arlee	Jocko Canyon Road near Arlee	1973	current	
S-563	—	—	I-90 near Springdale	Springdale	1975	2001	
S-564	24.992	40.221	US 87 in Carter	S-223 near Loma	1975	current	
S-565	7.134	11.481	MT 200 in Simms	US 89/S-441 near Fairfield	1975	current	
S-566	51.835	83.420	S-314 near Tongue River Reservoir State Park	US 212 in Ashland	1975	current	
S-567	35.943	57.845	MT 37 in Libby	S-508 in Yaak	1994	current	
S-568	2.673	4.302	I-94 near Pompeys Pillar	Pompeys Pillar	1976	current	
S-569	22	35	—	—	1976	1981	
S-569	22.020	35.438	MT 43 near Wise River	MT 1 near Opportunity	2001	current	Mt. Haggin scenic drive, formerly S-274
S-570	—	—	S-205/S-411 in Bozeman	I-90 in Bozeman	2001	2012	
S-571	1.168	1.880	US 89 in Emigrant	S-540 near Emigrant	2001	current	formerly S-362
S-572	1.750	2.816	S-540 near Emigrant	Chico Hot Springs	2001	current	formerly S-542
S-573	14.870	23.931	MT 16 in Medicine Lake	Katy Lake	2001	current	formerly part of S-515
S-574	10.970	17.655	I-90 in Huson	US 93/MT 200 near Wye	2006	current	
Former

== Secondary Highway 206 ==
Secondary Highway 206
- Location: Flathead County
- Length: 9.741 mi (15.677 km)
- Existed: 1960–present

Secondary Highway 206 (S-206) is a 9.741-mile-long (15.677 km) secondary state highway in Flathead County, Montana connecting Montana Highway 35 (MT 35) east of Evergreen to U.S. Highway 2 (US 2) east of Columbia Falls.

S-206 begins at the junction with MT 35 and runs almost due north to its terminus with US 2 east of Columbia Falls, providing a rural bypass for traffic headed to Glacier National Park, Kalispell, Bigfork and Polson.

S-206 passes through mostly rural landscape, and wildlife crossings should be expected at all times as animals search for food and water.

Today's S-206 was part of the original 1926 US 2 corridor from Kalispell to Columbia Falls (along with MT 35 from the S-206 southern terminus to Evergreen). This two-lane paved road was initially built in 1934 and last improved in 2011 as listed in the state road log.

The S-206 designation has existed since at least 1960 when S-206 was LaSalle Road, an 11.104-mile-long (17.870 km) four-lane highway that connected US 2 in Evergreen to MT 40 west of Columbia Falls and provides access to Glacier Park International Airport. It was route swapped from LaSalle Road in 1983 (as seen in the 1985 state map), and the former routing is now part of US 2 from junction P-52 (MT 35) to junction N-38 (MT 40).

== Secondary Highway 232 ==
Secondary Highway 232
- Location: Hill County
- Length: 42.784 mi (68.854 km)
- Existed: c. 1945–present

Secondary Highway 232 (S-232) is a 42.784 miles (68.854 km) long secondary state highway in eastern Hill County connecting Havre and the Canadian border.

S-232 begins in the census-designated place (CDP) of Havre North, at Havre city limits, and travels north to S-233 at 3.316 miles (5.337 km). S-232 turns northwest where it terminates the Wild Horse Border Crossing at the Canadian border, continuing north as Alberta Highway 41 towards Medicine Hat.

S-232 is a combined urban and secondary route, with Corridor C000232 comprises 7th Avenue and 5th Street North within Havre, connecting S-232 with U.S. Highway 2 (US 2).

== Secondary Highway 317 ==
Secondary Highway 317
- Location: Flathead County
- Length: 4.499 mi (7.240 km)
- Existed: 1953–present

Secondary Highway 317 (S-317) is a 4.499-mile-long (7.240 km) secondary state highway in Flathead County, Montana, connecting Kalispell and Evergreen.

S-317 begins at the "Four Corners" junction with Cemetery Road to the west and U.S. Highway 93 (US 93) and Lower Valley Road south of the city limits of Kalispell. It proceeds north on Willow Glen Drive, then north and east on Conrad Drive along the Stillwater River, and north on Shady Lane to its terminus at State Highway 35 (MT 35). It is a de facto southeast bypass of downtown Kalispell for traffic headed to Evergreen and places such as Glacier National Park and Bigfork.

S-317 passes through mostly rural landscape outside the Kalispell city limits, and wildlife crossings should be expected at all times as animals go to the river for water and search for food.

S-317 is a paved two-lane highway entirely within the Kalispell urban area. As such, it is signed as a secondary route (corridor C000317) but listed as an urban route (U-6734) in the road log.

== Secondary Highway 323 ==
Secondary Highway 323
- Location: Carter County
- Length: 71.130 mi (114.473 km)

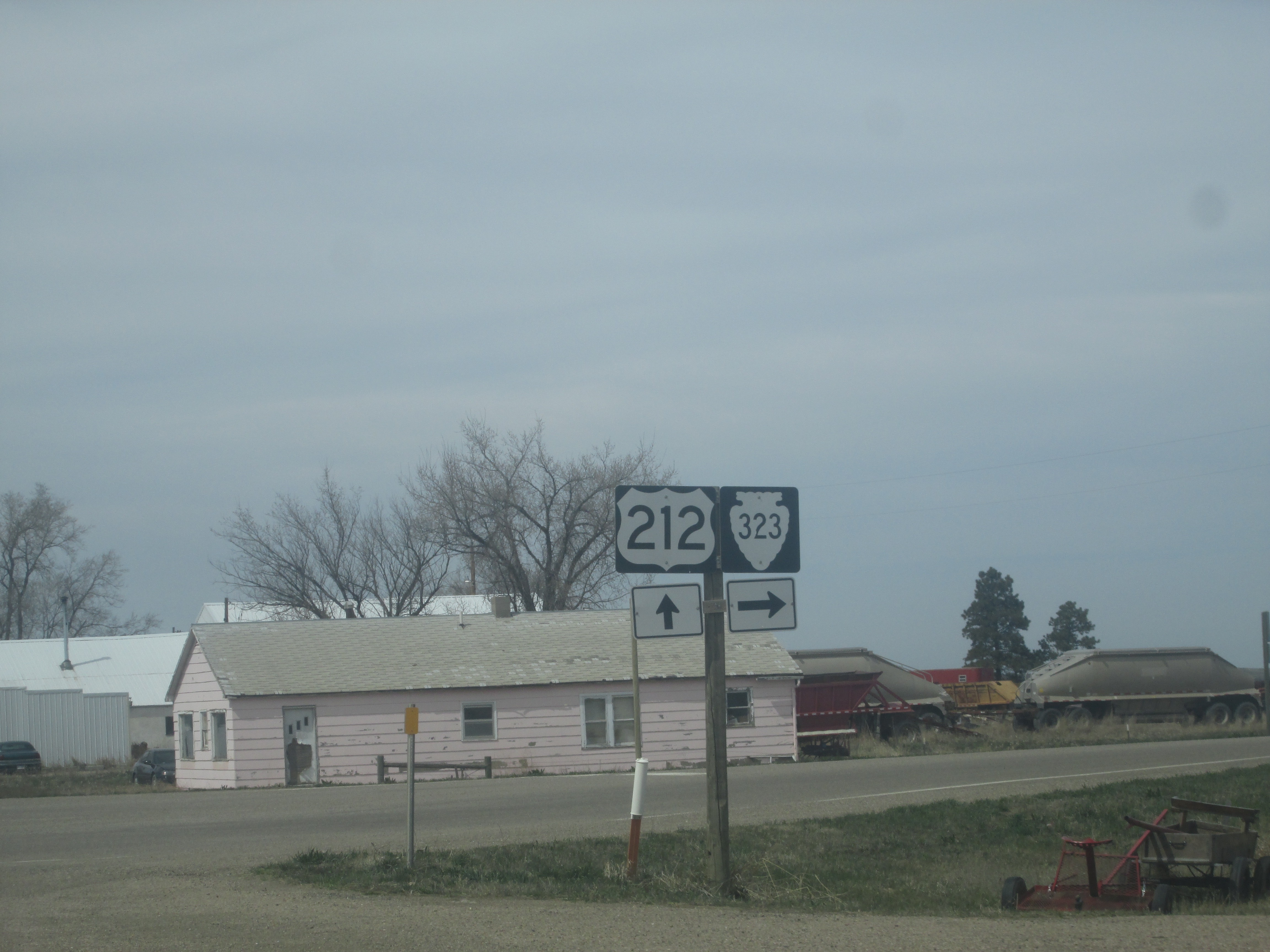
The intersection of S-323 and U.S. Route 212 in Alzada, April 2016.

Secondary Highway 323 (S‑323) is a 71.130-mile (114.473 km) secondary state highway in eastern Carter County, Montana, that connects Alzada and Ekalaka.

S‑323 begins at the U.S. Route 212 (US 212) in the unincorporated community of Alzada near the Montana-Wyoming state line. S‑323 travels north from Alzada through eastern Carter County. Secondary Highway 277 (Hammond Road) is intersected at 38.717 miles (62.309 km) and Secondary Highway 328 (Tie Creek Road) at 48.018 miles (77.277 km). S‑323 enters and leaves the Custer National Forest between 63.576 miles (102.316 km) and 66.304 miles (106.706 km), respectively. At 71.130 miles (114.473 km) S‑323 reaches its northern terminus at the southern terminus of Montana Highway 7 in Ekalaka.

S‑323 is a paved two-lane highway its entire length.

== Secondary Highway 326 ==
Secondary Highway 326
- Location: Carter County
- Length: 1.683 mi (2.709 km)

Secondary Highway 326 (S-326) is a secondary state highway in the extreme south part of Carter County, Montana.

S-326 begins at Wyoming Highway 112 (WYO 112) at the Montana–Wyoming state line. Located here is a historical marker for Camp Devin. The highway then travels north 1.7 miles (2.7 km) to end at US Route 212 (US 212) in Alzada.

== Secondary Highway 391 ==
Secondary Highway 391
- Location: Powder River County

Secondary Highway 391 (S-391) is a secondary state highway in the southern half of Powder River County, Montana, although it is a non-paved gravel road.

S-391 begins at the Montana–Wyoming state line in Powder River County. The gravel highway then travels north 36 miles (58 km) to an end at US Route 212 (US 212) in Broadus.

== Secondary Highway 419 ==
Secondary Highway 419
- Location: Stillwater County

Secondary Highway 419 (S-419) is a secondary state highway between Montana Highway 78 to the Stillwater Mining Company near Nye. The David Thatcher Memorial Highway is an 18-metre (0.018 km) highway that begins at the intersection of MT 78 and MT 419 south of Absarokee and runs through Fishtail and Nye. It was named in honor of World War II veteran and Montana native Sergeant David Thatcher, who enlisted in the United States Army Air Corps in December 1940. Thatcher was one of the Doolittle Raiders and a recipient of the Silver Star. On March 20, 2019, Governor Steve Bullock signed into law Montana Senate Bill 175, which named the section of highway.

== Secondary Highway 424 ==
Secondary Highway 424
- Location: Flathead County
- Length: 17.108 mi (27.533 km)
- Existed: 1930s–present

Secondary Highway 424 (S-424), also known as Three Mile Drive and Farm to Market Road, is a 17.108-mile-long (27.533 km) secondary state highway in Flathead County, Montana, connecting northwestern Kalispell to U.S. Route 93 (US 93) west of Whitefish.

S-424 begins at the junction of North Meridian Road and Three Mile Drive in Kalispell, just south of US 93 and just north of US 2. It follows Three Mile Drive west past the Kalispell Middle School to an interchange with the new US 93 Alternate before curving north and west as Farm to Market Road (subsuming sections of Springcreek Road and Four Mile Drive). S-424 proceeds mostly north from here, passing the West Valley Elementary School at the intersection with S-548, entering a forested area, going north on Lodgepole Road and then going east and north on Twin Bridges Road to its northern terminus at US 93 west of Whitefish, near Spencer Lake.

S-424 passes through mostly rural and forest landscape between Kalispell and Whitefish and wildlife crossings should be expected at all times as animals search for food and water.

S-424 is a paved two-lane road throughout. In the state road log, S-424 is a combined urban and secondary route, but is only currently signed outside the Kalispell city limits. Corridor C000424 comprises U-6706 (Three Mile Drive/Farm to Market Road) and S-424.

Farm to Market Road can be seen on the 1935 map as an all-weather gravel road.

The 1960 map was the first to use the S-424 route designation, where state highways were shown with square shields and the new numbered state roads (the secondary highways) were shown with oval shields.

Some map products still show the original S-424 routing, which continued on Farm to Market Road to the west terminus of, and including the entirety of, Twin Bridges Road. This routing provided access to Tally Lake Road and various U.S. Forest Service sites therein. The section of Farm to Market between Tally Lake and Twin Bridges Roads, even though paved, is much narrower and has more sudden curves than is preferred for modern driving. This prompted the route shift to Lodgepole Road between Farm to Market and Twin Bridges Roads. Lodgepole Road is a much wider county road built in 1956, and improved to paved state highway standards in 2003 expressly for this purpose.

Farm to Market Road continues north, providing access to the Twin Lakes area before intersecting with US 93 north of milepost 139.

== Secondary Highway 451 ==
Secondary Highway 451
- Location: Big Horn County
- Length: 38.047 mi (61.231 km)
- Existed: 1988–present

Secondary Highway 451 (S-451) is a 38.047-mile-long (61.231 km) secondary state highway in eastern Big Horn County that runs from the Wyoming state line, where it continues as WYO 345, to I-90/US 87 (exit 514) south of Crow Agency. Formerly part of US 87, it was formed when the US 87 designation was moved to be concurrent the recently completed section of I-90.

== Secondary Highway 486 ==
Secondary Highway 486
- Location: Flathead County
- Length: 22.646 mi (36.445 km)
- Existed: 1945–present

Secondary Highway 486 (S-486), also known as the North Fork Flathead Road (NFFR), is a 22.646-mile-long (36.445 km) secondary state highway in Flathead County, Montana, that connects the city of Columbia Falls with the Glacier National Park at Camas Road.

S-486 begins at the junction with U.S. Highway 2 (US 2) in Columbia Falls. It follows Nucleus Avenue north through downtown, turning northeast at Railroad Street (the truck route used by logging trucks coming from the north). It spends the next 21 miles (34 km) winding its way through the Flathead National Forest until it reaches its officially signed terminus at Camas Road, which leads to the western entrance of Glacier National Park.

The highway passes through mostly forest landscape north of Columbia Falls, and wildlife crossings should be expected at all times as animals search for food and water.

S-486 is a two-lane road paved for the first 12.367 miles (19.903 km) and mostly gravel the rest of the way. It is listed in the state road log as a combined urban and secondary route. Corridor C000486 comprises U-2501 (Nucleus Avenue/Railroad Street/North Fork Road) and S-486. The oldest section remaining in the current road was constructed by Flathead County in 1945, and the road has been signed as a state secondary highway since at least 1971.

Even though NFFR runs north from Columbia Falls to Canada, the S-486 designation (and the state funding that goes with it) currently stops at Camas Road. Flathead County is responsible for maintaining the gravel portion of S-486 and all construction and maintenance on the rest of the road that parallels the North Fork Flathead River to Polebridge (the northwestern entrance to Glacier National Park) and on to the Canadian border.

In August 2010, Flathead County and Montana Department of Transportation completed a study of the NFFR to evaluate corridor issues for the road such as dust pollution that carries into Glacier National Park. Because the NFFR is also Forest Highway 61, additional federal funding could be tapped for any reconstruction projects. With pending bridge replacement on US 2 near Hungry Horse scheduled for 2017, Columbia Falls city officials and residents are once again calling for paving the NFFR to Camas Road, at minimum, to give Glacier National Park visitors an alternate route to detour around the construction.

The entire route is in Flathead County.

Location	mi	km	Destinations	Notes
Columbia Falls	0.000	0.000	US 2 (Ninth Street)	Southern terminus; S-486 heads north as Nucleus Avenue
	22.646	36.445	Camas Creek Road	Northern terminus; roadway continues north as North Fork Flathead Road
1.000 mi = 1.609 km; 1.000 km = 0.621 mi

== Secondary Highway 487 ==
Secondary Highway 487
- Location: Flathead County
- Length: 7.223 mi (11.624 km)
- Existed: 1947–present

Secondary Highway 487 (S-487), also known as Big Mountain Road, is a 7.223-mile-long (11.624 km) secondary state highway in Flathead County, Montana connecting the city of Whitefish to the Whitefish Mountain Resort at Big Mountain.

S-487 begins at the junction with U.S. Highway 93 (US 93, 2nd Street) in Whitefish. It follows Baker Avenue, turning into Wisconsin Avenue when it crosses the BNSF railroad tracks west of the historic Amtrak station. S-487 turns west on Lakeshore Drive, before turning north onto Big Mountain Road and winding its way up to the Whitefish Mountain Resort at Big Mountain.

S-487 passes through mostly rural and forest landscape north of Whitefish, and wildlife crossings should be expected at all times as animals search for food and water.

S-487 is a paved two-lane road throughout, and is listed in the state road log as a combined urban and secondary route. Corridor C000487 comprises U-12001 (Baker Avenue/Wisconsin Avenue/Lakeshore Drive/Big Mountain Road) and S-487. Big Mountain Road was created in 1947 when the ski resort was established, and has been signed as a state secondary route since at least 1963.

== Secondary Highway 503 ==
Secondary Highway 503
- Location: Flathead County
- Length: 12.166 mi (19.579 km)
- Existed: 1967–present

Secondary Highway 503 (S-503) is a 12.166-mile-long (19.579 km) secondary state highway in Flathead County serving Foys Lake and Foys Canyon residents southwest of Kalispell.

S-503 begins at the junction with U.S. Highway 2 (US 2) and Meridian Road. It follows Meridian Road south to the southwest corner of the city limits of Kalispell. It meets the new US 93 Alternate at a roundabout, and proceeds west and southward on Foys Lake Road along Foys Lake and providing access to the Lone Pine State Park before heading southeast into Foys Canyon. S-503 turns north and emerges from the canyon at Rocky Cliff Drive and continues northward as Airport Road to its second roundabout with US 93 Alternate and passes the Kalispell city airport before reaching its terminus at US 93 and 13th Street East.

S-503 passes through mostly rural landscape outside the Kalispell city limits, and wildlife crossings should be expected at all times as animals search for food and water.

S-503 is now a paved two-lane road throughout, with the former gravel segment through Foys Canyon finally being reconstructed to paved state highway standards in 2002 to reduce dust pollution in the valley. In the state road log, S-503 is a combined urban and secondary route, but is only currently signed outside the Kalispell city limits. Corridor C000503 comprises U-6713 (Meridian Road), S-503, and U-6730 (Airport Road).

== Secondary Highway 508 ==
Secondary Highway 508
- Location: Lincoln County
- Length: 29.272 mi (47.109 km)

Secondary Highway 508 (S-508) is a secondary highway in far northwestern Montana. It begins at a junction with State Highway 37 (MT 37) and heads north-northeast to the town of Yaak where it ends at S-567. It is also known as Yaak River Road, and is located completely within Lincoln County.

== Secondary Highway 537 ==
Secondary Highway 537
- Location: Valley County
- Length: 23.126 mi (37.218 km)

Secondary Highway 537 (S-537) is a secondary highway in northeast Montana. It begins at a junction with U.S. Highway 2 (US 2) and heads north out of the town of Hinsdale where it turns into Hinsdale North Road as it heads towards the Canadian Border. It is located completely within Valley County.

== Secondary Highway 548 ==
Secondary Highway 548
- Location: Flathead County
- Length: 6.521 mi (10.495 km)
- Existed: 1969–present

Secondary Highway 548 (S-548), also known as West Reserve Drive and Old Reserve Drive, is a 6.521-mile-long (10.495 km) secondary state highway in Flathead County, Montana connecting S-424 across the northern rural areas of Kalispell to U.S. Highway 2 (US 2) in Evergreen.

S-548 begins at the junction with S-424 and McMannamy Draw. It proceeds east as Old Reserve Drive across rolling and flat terrain. It reaches Stillwater Road and passes Glacier High School before meeting the new US 93 Alternate and joining it for its last half mile (0.8 km) to US 93. Now under its original name, West Reserve Drive, S-548 proceeds east across the Stillwater River, intersects with Whitefish Stage Road, descends a hill, and crosses the Whitefish River before reaching its terminus at US 2 in Evergreen.

S-548 passes through mostly rural landscape outside the Kalispell city limits, and wildlife crossings should be expected at all times as animals search for food and water.

Prior to the realignment caused by the US 93 Alt. construction, S-548 was known throughout as West Reserve Drive, based on Evergreen's east/west divider at LaSalle Road (today's US 2).

S-548 is a paved two-lane road throughout, except for the four-lane segment where it is overlaid on US 93 Alt. and across US 93 east to Hutton Ranch Road. In the state road log, S-548 is a combined urban and secondary route. Corridor C000548 comprises S-548 and U-6737 (West Reserve Drive/Old Reserve Drive/Reserve Place).

Past US 2, East Reserve Drive (urban route U-6708) extends another 1.001 miles (1.611 km) to Helena Flats Road (U-6712) before coming totally under county construction, funding, and maintenance. East Reserve and Helena Flats provide a de facto rural bypass from north Evergreen, connecting the terminus of S-548 east and south to Montana Highway 35 (MT 35).
