= Area code 406 =

Telephone area code for Montana, United States

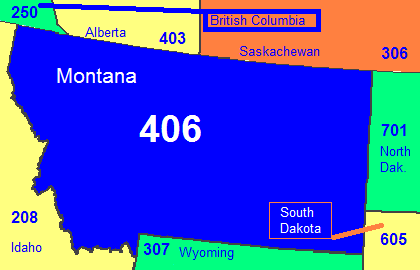
Montana numbering plan area and area code (blue)

Area code 406 is the telephone area code in the North American Numbering Plan for the entire U.S. state of Montana. It has been Montana's only area code since the American Telephone and Telegraph Company created a nationwide telephone numbering plan in 1947.

As of 2013, 47 carriers served 1.7 million lines in Montana. All but two wireline providers support local number portability (the exceptions are small rural independents Hot Springs Telephone Company and Northern Telephone Cooperative). Sufficient available codes for new exchanges in the 406 area code exist to meet anticipated demand until 2031; number pooling has been implemented in response to increased demand and inefficient use of 406 numbering resources.

Prior to October 2021, area code 406 had telephone numbers assigned for the central office code 988. In 2020, 988 was designated nationwide as a dialing code for the National Suicide Prevention Lifeline, which created a conflict for exchanges that permit seven-digit dialing. This area code was therefore scheduled to transition to ten-digit dialing by October 24, 2021.

For many Montanans, area code 406 has become an unofficial symbol of the state. Some Montanans celebrate April 6 as "406 Day," an unofficial holiday celebrating the state.

== Central office codes of communities ==
Within the Montana numbering plan area, the following communities are served by the listed central office codes:

- Absarokee: 328, 985
- Alberton: 722
- Alta: 349
- Alzada: 828, 938
- Anaconda: 559, 560, 563, 691, 797
- Arlee: 726
- Ashland: 784, 983
- Augusta: 562
- Avon: 492
- Bainville: 769
- Baker: 778, 891, 956, 978
- Belfry: 664
- Belgrade: 388, 813, 924
- Belt: 277
- Bigfork: 420, 837
- Big Sandy: 378
- Big Sky: 993, 995, 999
- Big Timber: 930, 931, 932, 936
- Billings: 200, 206, 208, 237, 238, 245, 247, 248, 252, 254, 255, 256, 259, 272, 281, 294, 318, 325, 371, 373, 384, 435, 500, 534, 545, 591, 598, 601, 606, 620, 647, 651, 652, 655, 656, 657, 661, 670, 671, 672, 690, 694, 696, 697, 698, 702, 794, 839, 850, 855, 860, 861, 867, 869, 876, 894, 896, 927, 969
- Birney: 984
- Bloomfield: 583
- Boulder: 225, 313
- Box Elder: 352
- Bozeman: 209, 219, 312, 404, 414, 451, 522, 539, 548, 551, 556, 570, 577, 579, 580, 581, 582, 585, 586, 587, 589, 595, 599, 600, 602, 624, 898, 916, 920, 922, 994
- Brady: 753
- Bridger: 662, 800
- Broadus: 436, 935
- Broadview: 667
- Brockton: 786
- Browning: 338, 573
- Busby: 592
- Butte: 221, 299, 310, 479, 490, 491, 494, 496, 497, 498, 533, 565, 593, 723, 782, 792
- Canyon Creek: 368
- Carlyle: 588
- Carter: 734
- Cascade: 468
- Charlo: 644
- Chester: 759
- Chinook: 357
- Choteau: 466
- Circle: 485, 974
- Clinton: 330, 825
- Clyde Park: 686
- Colstrip: 213, 720, 740, 748, 749
- Columbia Falls: 892, 897
- Columbus: 290, 298, 321, 322, 780
- Condon: 754
- Conrad: 271, 278, 289, 505, 576
- Cooke City: 838
- Crooked Creek: 484
- Culbertson: 514, 787, 790
- Custer: 856
- Cut Bank: 229, 391, 845, 873
- Dagmar: 483
- Darby: 821
- Decker: 757
- Deer Lodge: 415, 645, 846
- Denton: 567
- Devon: 432
- Dillon: 596, 660, 683, 865, 925, 960, 988
- Divide: 267, 553
- Sčilíp: 246
- Dodson: 383
- Drummond: 288
- Dupuyer: 472
- Dutton: 476
- East Conrad: 627
- East Glacier Park: 226
- Ekalaka: 775, 975
- Elmo: 631, 849
- Ennis: 682
- Ethridge: 339
- Eureka: 296
- Eureka rural: 297, 882, 889
- Fairfield: 467
- Fairview: 742, 747
- Fallon: 486
- Finley Point: 571, 887
- Flaxville: 474
- Flaxville rural: 779
- Forsyth: 201, 346, 351, 356, 729
- Fort Benton: 621, 622
- Fort Peck: 526
- Fort Shaw: 264
- Fort Smith: 666
- Frazer: 695
- Frenchtown: 508, 626
- Froid: 766
- Froid rural: 963
- Fromberg: 668
- Gallatin Gateway: 518, 763
- Gardiner: 848
- Geraldine: 737
- Geyser: 735
- Gildford: 376
- Glasgow: 228, 230, 263, 831, 942
- Glendive: 345, 359, 365, 377, 948, 987
- Glentana: 724
- Grant: 681
- Grass Range: 428, 928
- Great Falls: 205, 216, 217, 231, 268, 315, 403, 452, 453, 454, 455, 564, 590, 604, 727, 731, 750, 760, 761, 770, 771, 781, 788, 791, 799, 836, 866, 868, 870, 878, 899, 923, 952, 964, 965
- Hamilton: 360, 361, 363, 369, 375, 381, 802, 961
- Hardin: 623, 629, 638, 665, 679, 699, 953
- Harlem: 353
- Harlowton: 632
- Harrison: 685
- Haugan: 678
- Havre: 262, 265, 808, 879, 945
- Hays: 673
- Helena: 202, 204, 227, 324, 389, 410, 417, 422, 430, 431, 437, 438, 439, 440, 441, 442, 443, 444, 447, 449, 457, 458, 459, 461, 465, 475, 495, 502, 513, 555, 558, 594, 603, 634, 841, 933, 992, 996
- Highwood: 733
- Hingham: 397
- Hinsdale: 364
- Hobson: 423
- Hopp Illiad: 386
- Hot Springs: 741
- Hungry Horse: 387, 929
- Huntley: 348
- Hysham: 342
- Jackson: 834
- Joliet: 905, 962
- Joplin: 292
- Jordan: 557, 977
- Judith Gap: 473
- Kalispell: 212, 249, 250, 253, 257, 260, 261, 270, 300, 309, 314, 407, 471, 607, 751, 752, 755, 756, 758, 858, 871, 885, 890
- Kevin-Oilmont: 337
- Kremlin: 372
- Lakeside: 709, 844
- Lambert: 774, 914
- Lame Deer: 477
- Larslan: 725
- Laurel: 530, 628, 633, 743, 812
- Lavina: 636
- Lewistown: 350, 366, 380, 535, 538, 707, 708, 968
- Libby: 283, 291, 293, 334, 400
- Lima: 276, 340
- Lincoln: 362
- Lindsay: 584
- Livingston: 220, 222, 223, 224, 333, 823, 946
- Lodge Grass: 639
- Loma: 739
- Malta: 301, 654, 680
- Manhattan: 282, 284
- Marion: 854, 991
- Martinsdale: 572
- Medicine Lake: 789
- Melrose: 835
- Melstone: 358
- Melville: 537
- Miles City: 232, 233, 234, 851, 852, 853, 874, 934, 944, 951
- Missoula: 203, 207, 214, 215, 218, 239, 240, 241, 243, 251, 258, 273, 274, 303, 317, 327, 329, 370, 396, 493, 523, 529, 531, 532, 540, 541, 542, 543, 544, 546, 549, 550, 552, 721, 728, 829, 830, 880, 926
- Molt: 669
- Moore: 374
- Musselshell: 947
- Nashua: 746
- Neihart: 236
- North Broadus: 554
- North Cut Bank: 336
- North Frannie: 764
- North Glasgow: 367
- North Hinsdale: 648
- North Nashua: 785
- North Parkman: 643, 659
- North Poplar: 448
- North Havre: 394, 398
- North Ryegate: 575
- North Wolf Point: 392
- Noxon: 847
- Olney: 820, 881
- Opheim: 762
- Outlook: 895
- Ovando: 793
- Pablo: 275, 332, 675
- Peerless: 893
- Pendroy: 469
- Philipsburg: 859
- Plains: 826
- Plentywood: 765
- Plevna: 772, 971
- Polson: 319, 872, 883, 884
- Pompey's Pillar: 875
- Poplar: 768
- Potomac: 244
- Power: 463
- Rapelje: 663
- Raynesford: 738
- Red Lodge: 425, 426, 445, 446, 818
- Reed Point: 326
- Reserve: 286
- Richey: 773, 979
- Ridge: 767
- Rock Springs: 354
- Ronan: 528, 676, 833
- Rosebud: 347
- Roundup: 320, 323, 331, 913
- Roy: 464, 954
- Rudyard: 355
- Ryegate: 568
- Saco: 527
- Saint Ignatius: 744, 745, 824
- Saint Mary: 732
- Savage: 776
- Scobey: 487, 688
- Scobey rural: 783
- Seeley Lake: 210, 499, 677
- Shelby: 424, 434, 450, 460, 470, 597, 966
- Sheridan: 842
- Sidney: 433, 478, 480, 482, 488, 489, 630, 943, 973
- Silvertip: 574, 840
- Somers: 393, 857
- South Alberton: 864
- South Broadus: 427
- South Chester: 456
- South Miles City: 421, 981
- South Havre: 390, 395, 399
- South Malta: 658
- South Wolf Point: 525, 915
- Stanford: 566
- Stevensville: 625, 777
- Stockett: 736
- Saint Regis: 269, 280, 649
- Sunburst: 561, 937
- Superior: 382, 515, 822
- Swan Lake: 612, 886
- Sweetgrass: 335
- Terry: 635, 637, 957
- Thompson Falls: 242, 615, 827
- Three Forks: 285, 616
- Townsend: 266, 521, 949, 980
- Troy: 295
- Turner: 379
- Twin Bridges: 684
- Valier: 279
- Victor: 642
- Virginia City: 843
- Valley Industrial Park: 524
- Warm Springs: 693
- West Beach: 877
- Westby: 385
- West Camp Crook: 972
- West Glacier: 888
- West Glendive: 687, 939, 941, 989
- West Sidney: 798
- West Squaw Gap: 569
- West Yellowstone: 640, 641, 646
- Whitefish: 730, 862, 863
- Whitehall: 287
- Whitewater: 674
- White Sulphur Springs: 305, 547
- Wibaux: 795, 796
- Wilsall: 578
- Winifred: 462
- Winnett: 429
- Wisdom: 689
- Wise River: 832
- Wolf Creek: 235, 302
- Wolf Point: 650, 653
- Worden: 967
- Wyola: 343
- Yellow Bay: 692, 982
- Premium numbers: (1-406) 976

== See also ==
- List of North American Numbering Plan area code

Montana area codes: 406
	North: 236/672/778, 250, 306, 403, 587/825/368, 639	
West: 208/986	406	East: 605, 701
	South: 307	
Alberta area codes: 403, 587/825/368, 780
British Columbia area codes: 250, 604, 236/257/672/778
Saskatchewan area codes: 306/474/639
Idaho area codes: 208/986
North Dakota area codes: 701
South Dakota area codes: 605
Wyoming area codes: 307
