= Del Bonita =

Del Bonita may refer to:

- Del Bonita, Alberta, a hamlet on the Alberta-Montana border
- Del Bonita, Montana, also known as Port of Del Bonita, is an unincorporated community on the Montana-Alberta border
- Whetstone International Airport or Del Bonita/Whetstone International Airport (IATA: DJN, FAA LID: H28, TC LID: CEQ4) a US airport that lies on the Canada – United States border
