= Big Sag, Montana =

Unincorporated community in Montana, U.S.

Coordinates: 47°35′52″N 110°42′49″W

Big Sag is an unincorporated community in Chouteau County, in the U.S. state of Montana. It is located off of Montana Secondary Highway 228. It is near the Big Sag Waterfowl Production Area.

== History ==
The community took its name from the nearby Big Sag valley. Big Sag has been noted for its unusual place name.
