= Olney, Montana =

Unincorporated community in Montana, United States

- Census-designated place
- Location within Montana Location within the United States
- Coordinates: 48°32′56″N 114°34′19″W
- Country: United States
- State: Montana
- County: Flathead

Area
  - Total: 1.34 sq mi (3.48 km^{2})
  - Land: 1.33 sq mi (3.44 km^{2})
  - Water: 0.015 sq mi (0.04 km^{2})
- Elevation: 3,199 ft (975 m)

Population (2020)
  - Total: 186
  - Density: 139.8/sq mi (53.99/km^{2})
- Time zone: UTC-7 (Mountain (MST))
  - Summer (DST): UTC-6 (MDT)
- ZIP code: 59927
- Area code: 406
- GNIS feature ID: 2583831

Olney is a census-designated place and unincorporated community in Flathead County, Montana, United States. Its population was 186 as of the 2020 census. Olney has a post office with ZIP code 59927. The most recent 2020 census states the population is 146 according to census.gov. The community is located along U.S. Route 93.

The post office opened in 1907.

It is near Lower Stillwater Lake.

== Climate ==
Climate data for Olney, Montana, 1991–2020 normals, 1962–2020 extremes: 3165ft (965m)
Month	Jan	Feb	Mar	Apr	May	Jun	Jul	Aug	Sep	Oct	Nov	Dec	Year
Record high °F (°C)	49 (9)	62 (17)	70 (21)	86 (30)	93 (34)	98 (37)	101 (38)	100 (38)	98 (37)	80 (27)	65 (18)	52 (11)	101 (38)
Mean maximum °F (°C)	42.0 (5.6)	47.8 (8.8)	59.3 (15.2)	72.8 (22.7)	82.4 (28.0)	86.8 (30.4)	92.6 (33.7)	93.1 (33.9)	85.3 (29.6)	70.0 (21.1)	52.8 (11.6)	40.5 (4.7)	94.8 (34.9)
Mean daily maximum °F (°C)	27.9 (−2.3)	34.1 (1.2)	42.9 (6.1)	52.8 (11.6)	63.2 (17.3)	69.2 (20.7)	79.8 (26.6)	79.6 (26.4)	68.6 (20.3)	51.9 (11.1)	36.0 (2.2)	26.9 (−2.8)	52.7 (11.5)
Daily mean °F (°C)	20.0 (−6.7)	22.9 (−5.1)	30.9 (−0.6)	39.4 (4.1)	48.7 (9.3)	55.0 (12.8)	61.5 (16.4)	60.2 (15.7)	50.9 (10.5)	38.6 (3.7)	27.7 (−2.4)	20.0 (−6.7)	39.7 (4.3)
Mean daily minimum °F (°C)	12.1 (−11.1)	11.8 (−11.2)	18.9 (−7.3)	25.9 (−3.4)	34.1 (1.2)	40.9 (4.9)	43.1 (6.2)	40.7 (4.8)	33.3 (0.7)	25.3 (−3.7)	19.3 (−7.1)	13.2 (−10.4)	26.6 (−3.0)
Mean minimum °F (°C)	−14.9 (−26.1)	−14.0 (−25.6)	2.4 (−16.4)	14.7 (−9.6)	22.3 (−5.4)	28.9 (−1.7)	33.3 (0.7)	31.2 (−0.4)	22.4 (−5.3)	11.2 (−11.6)	−1.1 (−18.4)	−13.2 (−25.1)	−26.2 (−32.3)
Record low °F (°C)	−35 (−37)	−40 (−40)	−24 (−31)	−1 (−18)	16 (−9)	24 (−4)	28 (−2)	26 (−3)	12 (−11)	−10 (−23)	−25 (−32)	−44 (−42)	−44 (−42)
Average precipitation inches (mm)	1.98 (50)	1.33 (34)	1.33 (34)	1.19 (30)	2.12 (54)	3.03 (77)	1.33 (34)	1.08 (27)	1.23 (31)	1.75 (44)	1.91 (49)	2.02 (51)	20.3 (515)
Average snowfall inches (cm)	27.1 (69)	18.5 (47)	8.9 (23)	3.0 (7.6)	0.2 (0.51)	0.0 (0.0)	0.0 (0.0)	0.0 (0.0)	0.0 (0.0)	0.8 (2.0)	16.5 (42)	26.5 (67)	101.5 (258.11)
Average extreme snow depth inches (cm)	32.9 (84)	30.6 (78)	22.0 (56)	5.4 (14)	0.0 (0.0)	0.0 (0.0)	0.0 (0.0)	0.0 (0.0)	0.0 (0.0)	1.2 (3.0)	8.9 (23)	25.3 (64)	43.4 (110)
Average precipitation days (≥ 0.01 in)	10.4	7.0	8.4	7.3	10.5	12.7	6.7	5.3	7.1	9.3	10.4	10.4	105.5
Average snowy days (≥ 0.1 in)	8.8	5.6	4.0	1.1	0.1	0.0	0.0	0.0	0.0	0.8	5.1	8.5	34
Source 1: NOAA (1981-2010 snowfall)
Source 2: XMACIS2 (records, 1981-2010 monthly max/mins & snow depth)

== Demographics ==
Historical population
Census	Pop.	Note	%±
2010	192		—
2020	186		−3.1%
U.S. Decennial Census
