= Ledger, Montana =

- Unincorporated community
- Location within Montana Location within the United States
- Coordinates: 48°15′37″N 111°49′23″W
- Country: United States
- State: Montana
- County: Pondera
- Elevation: 3,265 ft (995 m)
- Time zone: UTC-7 (Mountain (MST))
  - Summer (DST): UTC-6 (MDT)
- ZIP code: 59456
- Area code: 406
- GNIS feature ID: 773275

Ledger is an unincorporated community in Pondera County, Montana, United States. Ledger is 8.5 miles (13.7 km) northeast of Conrad. The community had a post office until December 17, 2005; it still has its own ZIP code, 59456.

The post office opened in 1916 under the name Esper. The name changed in 1917 to Ledgerwood in honor of local resident Dan Ledgerwood. Since North Dakota already had a Ledgerwood, some residents shortened the name to Ledger.
