= Musselshell, Montana =

- Census-designated place
- Location in Musselshell County and the state of Montana
- Coordinates: 46°28′55″N 108°05′44″W
- Country: United States
- State: Montana
- County: Musselshell

Area
  - Total: 2.55 sq mi (6.61 km^{2})
  - Land: 2.55 sq mi (6.61 km^{2})
  - Water: 0 sq mi (0.00 km^{2})
- Elevation: 3,038 ft (926 m)

Population (2020)
  - Total: 59
  - Density: 23.1/sq mi (8.93/km^{2})
- Time zone: UTC-7 (Mountain (MST))
  - Summer (DST): UTC-6 (MDT)
- ZIP code: 59059
- Area code: 406
- FIPS code: 30-52600
- GNIS feature ID: 2408895

Musselshell is an unincorporated community and census-designated place (CDP) in Musselshell County, Montana, United States. The population of the CDP was 59 at the 2020 census. The village is located near the Musselshell River.

== History ==
In 1866, the Rocky Mountain Wagon Road Company built a trading post named "Kerchival City". Flooding destroyed the post. The Montana Hide and Fur Company later built a post and warehouse on the site and renamed it Musselshell.

== Geography ==
The town is located in eastern Musselshell County, just south of U.S. Route 12. Roundup, the county seat, is 23 miles (37 km) to the west via US 12, and Melston is 12 miles (19 km) to the northeast. Montana Secondary Highway 310 (South Musselshell Road) runs through the center of the community and leads southeast 40 miles (64 km) to Custer and Interstate 94.

According to the U.S. Census Bureau, the Musselshell CDP has a total area of 2.55 square miles (6.6 km^{2}), all land. The Musselshell River, an east-flowing tributary of the Missouri, forms the northern edge of the community, and a tributary, Hawk Creek, runs along the western edge of the community.

== Demographics ==
Historical population
Census	Pop.	Note	%±
2000	60		—
2010	60		0.0%
2020	59		−1.7%
U.S. Decennial Census

As of the census of 2000, there were 60 people, 28 households, and 22 families residing in the CDP. The population density was 23.4 inhabitants per square mile (9.0/km^{2}). There were 49 housing units at an average density of 19.1 per square mile (7.4/km^{2}). The racial makeup of the CDP was 100.00% White.

There were 28 households, out of which 17.9% had children under the age of 18 living with them, 71.4% were married couples living together, and 21.4% were non-families. 21.4% of all households were made up of individuals, and 7.1% had someone living alone who was 65 years of age or older. The average household size was 2.14 and the average family size was 2.45.

In the CDP, the population was spread out, with 16.7% under the age of 18, 25.0% from 25 to 44, 25.0% from 45 to 64, and 33.3% who were 65 years of age or older. The median age was 50 years. For every 100 females, there were 106.9 males. For every 100 females age 18 and over, there were 108.3 males.

The median income for a household in the CDP was $23,750, and the median income for a family was $24,219. Males had a median income of $26,250 versus $17,500 for females. The per capita income for the CDP was $8,501. There were 17.4% of families and 23.5% of the population living below the poverty line, including 36.8% of under eighteens and 21.1% of those over 64.

== Media ==
The local newspaper is the Roundup Record-Tribune. It is published weekly and serves Musselshell County and the neighboring counties.
