= Rapelje, Montana =

Census-designated place in Montana, United States

- Census-Designated Place
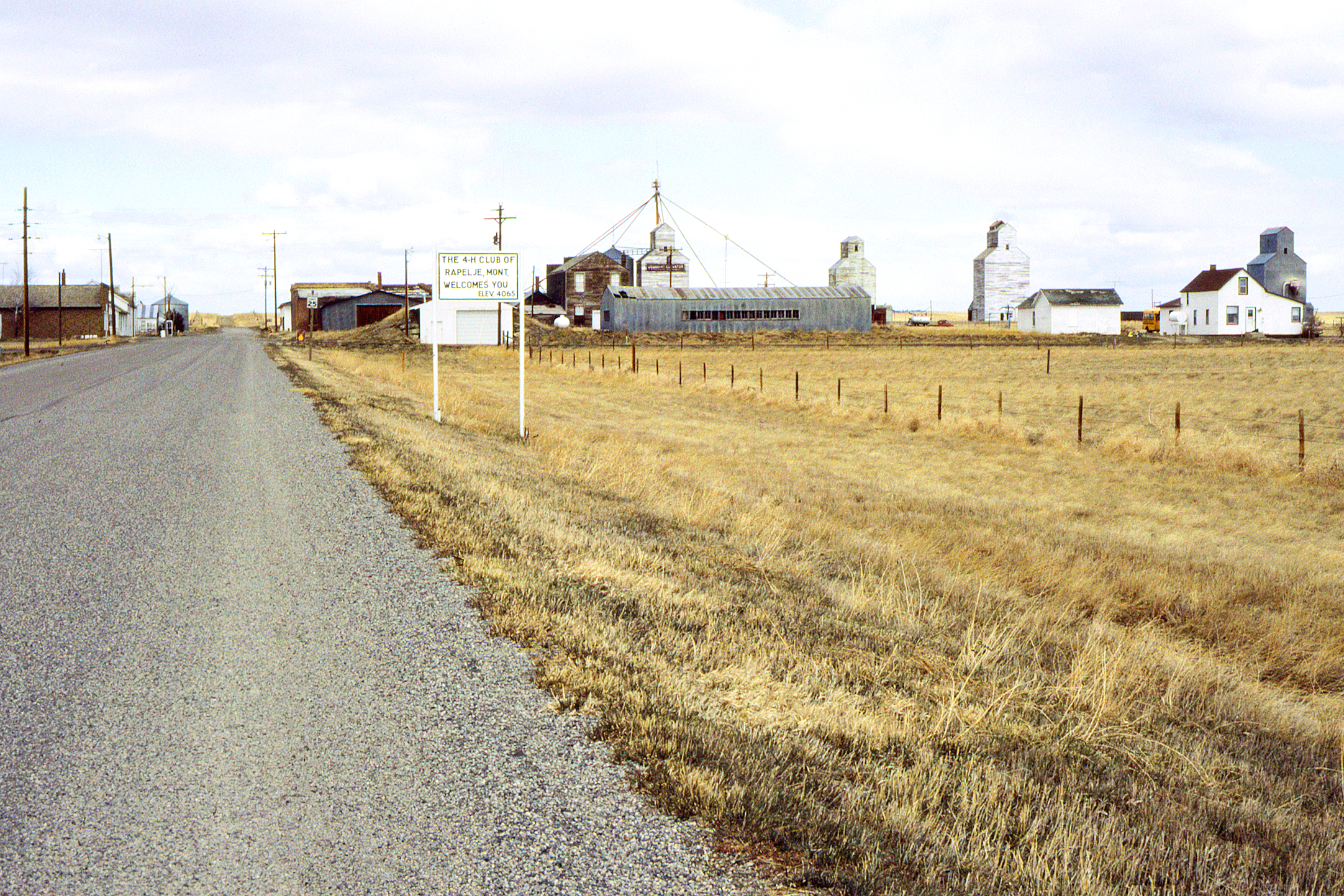
- Rapelje, Montana
- Nickname: City of wheat
- Motto: "Home is where the heart is"
- Location within Montana Location within the United States
- Coordinates: 45°58′19″N 109°15′29″W
- Country: United States
- State: Montana
- County: Stillwater

Area
  - Total: 0.49 sq mi (1.28 km^{2})
  - Land: 0.49 sq mi (1.28 km^{2})
  - Water: 0 sq mi (0.00 km^{2})
- Elevation: 4,068 ft (1,240 m)

Population (2020)
  - Total: 88
  - Density: 178.7/sq mi (68.98/km^{2})
- Time zone: UTC-7 (Mountain (MST))
  - Summer (DST): UTC-6 (MDT)
- ZIP code: 59067
- Area code: 406
- FIPS code: 30-60850
- GNIS feature ID: 2806668

Rapelje is an unincorporated community and census-Designated Place in northern Stillwater County, Montana, United States. Rapelje was named for J. M. Rapelje, general manager and vice president of the Northern Pacific Railway. As of the 2020 census, Rapelje had a population of 88. Rapelje is located 24 miles north of Columbus on Montana Secondary Highway 306.

== History ==
Rapelje was originally called Lake Basin due to its geographical landscape, but in 1913 it was named after J.M. Rapelje, who was one of the heads of the Northern Pacific Railroad. Rapelje was first established as a town where local railroad workers of the Northern Pacific Railway would live in the late 1800s. As more people began to work at the railroad, the town grew bigger in both size and population. They had multiple establishments such as a hotel, a grocery store, a town hall, a K-12 school, and many other things. A post office was established in 1913, and the four grain towers (which are still there today) were put in business. A railroad destination point, Rapelje developed into a reasonable town with a number of grain elevators, its own school district, an evangelical church, a cafe, and later a violin shop and clothing business. In 1980, the railroad was taken out of Rapelje, and the population declined, as well as sales and business. Businesses and residents of Rapelje largely dispersed from the town over the following decades. The hotel burned down, the town hall was removed, and the grocery store was closed.

== 24 Hours of Rapelje ==
The 24 Hours of Rapelje is a USA Cycling sanctioned endurance mountain bike race held on the weekend in June closest to the summer solstice. The race is coordinated by the local volunteers.

== Climate ==
According to the Köppen Climate Classification system, Rapelje had a semi-arid climate, abbreviated "BSk" on climate maps.

Climate data for Rapelje, Montana, 1991–2020 normals, extremes 1908–2021
Month	Jan	Feb	Mar	Apr	May	Jun	Jul	Aug	Sep	Oct	Nov	Dec	Year
Record high °F (°C)	71 (22)	72 (22)	80 (27)	88 (31)	98 (37)	104 (40)	108 (42)	105 (41)	103 (39)	93 (34)	79 (26)	69 (21)	108 (42)
Mean maximum °F (°C)	58.0 (14.4)	59.8 (15.4)	68.9 (20.5)	77.7 (25.4)	83.7 (28.7)	91.9 (33.3)	98.2 (36.8)	97.3 (36.3)	93.0 (33.9)	81.3 (27.4)	67.4 (19.7)	57.4 (14.1)	99.8 (37.7)
Mean daily maximum °F (°C)	35.6 (2.0)	37.6 (3.1)	46.8 (8.2)	54.8 (12.7)	64.0 (17.8)	73.3 (22.9)	84.2 (29.0)	83.6 (28.7)	72.9 (22.7)	57.5 (14.2)	44.2 (6.8)	35.8 (2.1)	57.5 (14.2)
Daily mean °F (°C)	25.0 (−3.9)	26.5 (−3.1)	34.6 (1.4)	42.1 (5.6)	51.1 (10.6)	59.7 (15.4)	68.4 (20.2)	67.3 (19.6)	57.8 (14.3)	44.8 (7.1)	33.3 (0.7)	25.6 (−3.6)	44.7 (7.0)
Mean daily minimum °F (°C)	14.5 (−9.7)	15.4 (−9.2)	22.4 (−5.3)	29.5 (−1.4)	38.1 (3.4)	46.2 (7.9)	52.7 (11.5)	51.0 (10.6)	42.8 (6.0)	32.1 (0.1)	22.3 (−5.4)	15.5 (−9.2)	31.9 (−0.1)
Mean minimum °F (°C)	−14.6 (−25.9)	−9.6 (−23.1)	−1.0 (−18.3)	16.0 (−8.9)	24.5 (−4.2)	34.0 (1.1)	42.9 (6.1)	39.3 (4.1)	29.0 (−1.7)	11.3 (−11.5)	−4.2 (−20.1)	−10.7 (−23.7)	−23.8 (−31.0)
Record low °F (°C)	−41 (−41)	−45 (−43)	−30 (−34)	−11 (−24)	−1 (−18)	24 (−4)	30 (−1)	26 (−3)	10 (−12)	−15 (−26)	−34 (−37)	−39 (−39)	−45 (−43)
Average precipitation inches (mm)	0.46 (12)	0.57 (14)	0.76 (19)	1.78 (45)	2.73 (69)	2.42 (61)	1.64 (42)	1.06 (27)	1.40 (36)	1.35 (34)	0.57 (14)	0.49 (12)	15.23 (385)
Average snowfall inches (cm)	7.8 (20)	9.8 (25)	8.8 (22)	6.6 (17)	1.1 (2.8)	0.0 (0.0)	0.0 (0.0)	0.0 (0.0)	0.2 (0.51)	5.6 (14)	6.4 (16)	8.0 (20)	54.3 (137.31)
Average precipitation days (≥ 0.01 in)	4.2	4.5	5.5	8.2	10.3	9.3	7.0	5.8	5.7	6.0	4.4	4.5	75.4
Average snowy days (≥ 0.1 in)	4.1	4.0	3.6	2.3	0.4	0.0	0.0	0.0	0.1	1.7	3.0	3.8	23.0
Source 1: NOAA
Source 2: National Weather Service

== Demographics ==
Historical population
Census	Pop.	Note	%±
2020	88		—
U.S. Decennial Census

== Education ==
Rapelje School District educates students from kindergarten through 12th grade. Rapelje High School's team name is the Renegades.
