= Bloomfield, Montana =

- Unincorporated community
- Location within Montana Location within the United States
- Coordinates: 47°24′46″N 104°55′02″W
- Country: United States
- State: Montana
- County: Dawson

Area
  - Total: 0.058 sq mi (0.15 km^{2})
  - Land: 0.058 sq mi (0.15 km^{2})
  - Water: 0 sq mi (0.00 km^{2})
- Elevation: 2,615 ft (797 m)

Population (2020)
  - Total: 6
  - Density: 101.7/sq mi (39.27/km^{2})
- Time zone: UTC-7 (Mountain (MST))
  - Summer (DST): UTC-6 (MDT)
- ZIP code: 59315
- Area code: 406
- GNIS feature ID: 780133

Bloomfield (formerly, Adams) is an unincorporated community in Dawson County, Montana, United States. It is located 23 miles (37 km) northeast of the Yellowstone River and the city of Glendive, which is the county seat for Dawson County. Bloomfield is inside area code 406 and has a post office with ZIP code 59315. The population of the community was 6 at the 2020 census.

The community takes its name from Bloomfield, Nebraska, hometown of settlers J. Berton and Dave Crockett. They were soon followed by other Bloomfield families. Previously the town was part of an Amish community.

== Demographics ==
Historical population
Census	Pop.	Note	%±
2020	6		—
U.S. Decennial Census

== Climate ==
According to the Köppen Climate Classification system, Bloomfield has a semi-arid climate, abbreviated "BSk" on climate maps.
