= Brockton, Montana =

- Census-designated place
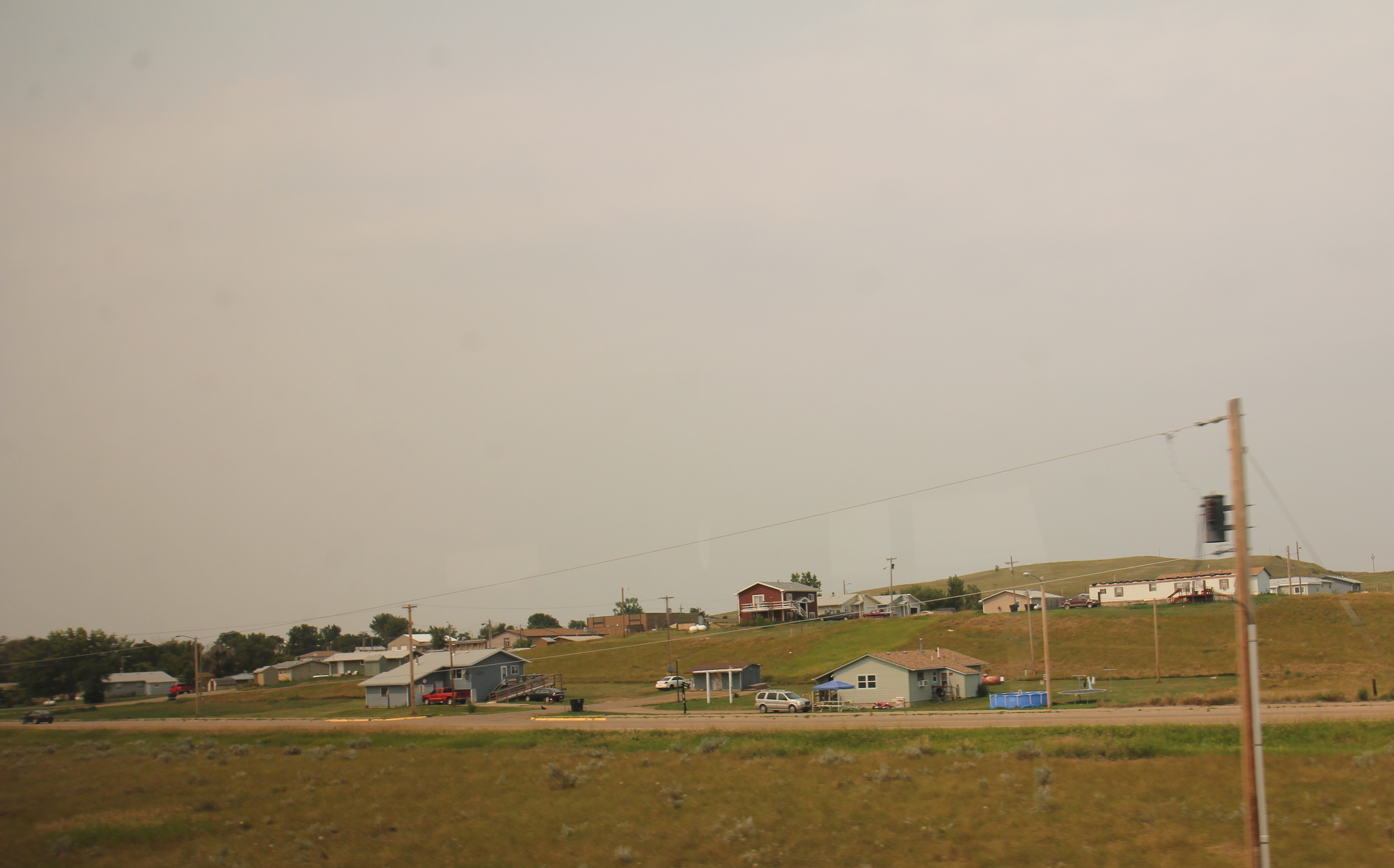
- Panorama of Brockton

- Location of Brockton, Montana
- Coordinates: 48°09′09″N 104°54′24″W
- Country: United States
- State: Montana
- County: Roosevelt

Area
  - Total: 1.10 sq mi (2.84 km^{2})
  - Land: 0.99 sq mi (2.56 km^{2})
  - Water: 0.11 sq mi (0.28 km^{2})
- Elevation: 1,955 ft (596 m)

Population (2020)
  - Total: 358
  - Density: 361.7/sq mi (139.64/km^{2})
- Time zone: UTC-7 (Mountain (MST))
  - Summer (DST): UTC-6 (MDT)
- ZIP code: 59213
- Area code: 406
- FIPS code: 30-10000
- GNIS feature ID: 2803713

Brockton is a census-designated place and former town in Roosevelt County, Montana, United States. The population was 358 at the 2020 census.

Brockton's first post office was established in 1904. Fort Peck Indian Reservation was opened to non-Native settlers in 1913 and the town boomed. It was incorporated in 1952, and was disincorporated on January 23, 2018.

== Geography ==
According to the United States Census Bureau, the town has a total area of 0.23 square miles (0.60 km^{2}), all land.

=== Climate ===
Wolf Point 29 ENE is a weather station located roughly 12 miles (19.3 km) northwest of Brockton. Wolf Point 29 ENE has a humid continental climate (Köppen Dfb), bordering on a cold semi-arid climate (Köppen BSk).

Climate data for Wolf Point 29 ENE, Montana, 1991–2020 normals, 2010-2020 snowfall: 2085ft (636m)
Month	Jan	Feb	Mar	Apr	May	Jun	Jul	Aug	Sep	Oct	Nov	Dec	Year
Record high °F (°C)	60 (16)	66 (19)	80 (27)	88 (31)	95 (35)	98 (37)	111 (44)	106 (41)	101 (38)	89 (32)	73 (23)	60 (16)	111 (44)
Mean maximum °F (°C)	47.4 (8.6)	47.1 (8.4)	64.3 (17.9)	79.1 (26.2)	86.0 (30.0)	92.5 (33.6)	98.7 (37.1)	98.7 (37.1)	94.3 (34.6)	79.9 (26.6)	63.8 (17.7)	47.1 (8.4)	98.1 (36.7)
Mean daily maximum °F (°C)	23.4 (−4.8)	27.7 (−2.4)	40.4 (4.7)	55.8 (13.2)	66.9 (19.4)	75.7 (24.3)	83.6 (28.7)	83.6 (28.7)	72.5 (22.5)	56.1 (13.4)	39.1 (3.9)	26.8 (−2.9)	54.3 (12.4)
Daily mean °F (°C)	11.7 (−11.3)	16.1 (−8.8)	28.2 (−2.1)	41.6 (5.3)	52.4 (11.3)	61.6 (16.4)	68.2 (20.1)	67.3 (19.6)	56.3 (13.5)	41.6 (5.3)	26.5 (−3.1)	14.9 (−9.5)	40.5 (4.7)
Mean daily minimum °F (°C)	−0.1 (−17.8)	4.6 (−15.2)	16.1 (−8.8)	27.4 (−2.6)	37.9 (3.3)	47.5 (8.6)	52.9 (11.6)	51.0 (10.6)	40.1 (4.5)	27.2 (−2.7)	13.9 (−10.1)	2.9 (−16.2)	26.8 (−2.9)
Mean minimum °F (°C)	−27.4 (−33.0)	−23.8 (−31.0)	−9.2 (−22.9)	10.4 (−12.0)	21.2 (−6.0)	35.7 (2.1)	42.5 (5.8)	36.7 (2.6)	23.5 (−4.7)	9.0 (−12.8)	−10.4 (−23.6)	−24.7 (−31.5)	−32.7 (−35.9)
Record low °F (°C)	−43 (−42)	−47 (−44)	−32 (−36)	−6 (−21)	8 (−13)	28 (−2)	38 (3)	32 (0)	14 (−10)	−7 (−22)	−24 (−31)	−41 (−41)	−47 (−44)
Average precipitation inches (mm)	0.43 (11)	0.30 (7.6)	0.59 (15)	1.03 (26)	2.19 (56)	2.94 (75)	2.57 (65)	1.38 (35)	1.07 (27)	0.87 (22)	0.43 (11)	0.39 (9.9)	14.19 (360.5)
Average snowfall inches (cm)	4.4 (11)	4.2 (11)	5.9 (15)	2.3 (5.8)	0.0 (0.0)	0.0 (0.0)	0.0 (0.0)	0.0 (0.0)	0.0 (0.0)	1.2 (3.0)	3.9 (9.9)	5.8 (15)	27.7 (70.7)
Source 1: NOAA
Source 2: XMACIS (Brockton 11.6 N snowfall, temp records & monthly max/mins)

== Demographics ==
Historical population
Census	Pop.	Note	%±
1960	367		—
1970	401		9.3%
1980	374		−6.7%
1990	365		−2.4%
2000	245		−32.9%
2010	255		4.1%
2020	358		40.4%
U.S. Decennial Census

=== 2010 census ===
As of the census of 2010, there were 255 people, 70 households, and 61 families residing in the town. The population density was 1,108.7 inhabitants per square mile (428.1/km^{2}). There were 77 housing units at an average density of 334.8 per square mile (129.3/km^{2}). The racial makeup of the town was 3.9% White and 96.1% Native American. Hispanic or Latino of any race were 1.2% of the population.

There were 70 households, of which 65.7% had children under the age of 18 living with them, 28.6% were married couples living together, 42.9% had a female householder with no husband present, 15.7% had a male householder with no wife present, and 12.9% were non-families. 11.4% of all households were made up of individuals, and 2.9% had someone living alone who was 65 years of age or older. The average household size was 3.64 and the average family size was 3.84.

The median age in the town was 22.4 years. 39.2% of residents were under the age of 18; 15.7% were between the ages of 18 and 24; 18.4% were from 25 to 44; 20.4% were from 45 to 64; and 6.3% were 65 years of age or older. The gender makeup of the town was 49.0% male and 51.0% female.

=== 2000 census ===
As of the census of 2000, there were 245 people, 67 households, and 59 families residing in the town. The population density was 1,285.7 inhabitants per square mile (496.4/km^{2}). There were 72 housing units at an average density of 377.8 per square mile (145.9/km^{2}). The racial makeup of the town was 13.06% White, 84.90% Native American, 0.41% Pacific Islander, and 1.63% from two or more races. Hispanic or Latino of any race were 1.22% of the population.

There were 67 households, out of which 47.8% had children under the age of 18 living with them, 37.3% were married couples living together, 37.3% had a female householder with no husband present, and 11.9% were non-families. 9.0% of all households were made up of individuals, and 1.5% had someone living alone who was 65 years of age or older. The average household size was 3.66 and the average family size was 3.85.

In the town, the population was spread out, with 42.0% under the age of 18, 7.8% from 18 to 24, 25.3% from 25 to 44, 19.2% from 45 to 64, and 5.7% who were 65 years of age or older. The median age was 25 years. For every 100 females, there were 91.4 males. For every 100 females age 18 and over, there were 94.5 males.

The median income for a household in the town was $19,167, and the median income for a family was $19,167. Males had a median income of $30,625 versus $25,625 for females. The per capita income for the town was $8,231. About 43.5% of families and 50.8% of the population were below the poverty line, including 53.3% of those under the age of eighteen and 85.7% of those 65 or over.

== Transportation ==
Amtrak’s Empire Builder, which operates between Seattle/Portland and Chicago, passes through the town on BNSF tracks, but makes no stop. The nearest station is located in Wolf Point, 35 miles (56 km) to the west.

== Education ==
Brockton School District educates students from kindergarten through 12th grade. The team name for Brockton High School is the Warriors.
