= Lindsay, Montana =

- Unincorporated community
- Location within Montana Location within the United States
- Coordinates: 47°13′08″N 105°09′14″W
- Country: United States
- State: Montana
- County: Dawson

Area
  - Total: 0.65 sq mi (1.68 km^{2})
  - Land: 0.65 sq mi (1.68 km^{2})
  - Water: 0 sq mi (0.00 km^{2})
- Elevation: 2,680 ft (820 m)

Population (2020)
  - Total: 12
  - Density: 18.5/sq mi (7.15/km^{2})
- Time zone: UTC-7 (Mountain (MST))
  - Summer (DST): UTC-6 (MDT)
- ZIP code: 59339
- Area code: 406
- GNIS feature ID: 773370

Lindsay is an unincorporated hamlet in Dawson County, Montana, United States, located on Montana Highway 200S and the Upper Sevenmile Creek, 22.3 miles (35.9 km) west-northwest of Glendive. The community has a post office with ZIP code 59339, a public school, and a cooperative.

The town is named for Willam Lindsay, an Ohio-born businessman and the first rancher and freighter in the region. In the 1920s, the town moved from its original site when the Northern Pacific Railway built its branch line to Circle.

== Demographics ==
Historical population
Census	Pop.	Note	%±
2020	12		—
U.S. Decennial Census

== Climate ==
Climate data for Lindsay, Montana, 1991–2020 normals, extremes 1915–1919, 1962–2018
Month	Jan	Feb	Mar	Apr	May	Jun	Jul	Aug	Sep	Oct	Nov	Dec	Year
Record high °F (°C)	65 (18)	67 (19)	78 (26)	87 (31)	96 (36)	103 (39)	107 (42)	102 (39)	99 (37)	89 (32)	75 (24)	66 (19)	107 (42)
Mean maximum °F (°C)	49.5 (9.7)	53.3 (11.8)	65.0 (18.3)	76.5 (24.7)	84.1 (28.9)	91.2 (32.9)	96.9 (36.1)	95.3 (35.2)	90.3 (32.4)	78.3 (25.7)	63.2 (17.3)	49.9 (9.9)	98.2 (36.8)
Mean daily maximum °F (°C)	27.8 (−2.3)	30.5 (−0.8)	42.5 (5.8)	54.3 (12.4)	65.2 (18.4)	74.3 (23.5)	83.2 (28.4)	82.2 (27.9)	71.4 (21.9)	54.9 (12.7)	41.1 (5.1)	29.9 (−1.2)	54.8 (12.7)
Daily mean °F (°C)	17.2 (−8.2)	19.6 (−6.9)	30.6 (−0.8)	41.1 (5.1)	51.4 (10.8)	60.9 (16.1)	68.1 (20.1)	67.1 (19.5)	56.8 (13.8)	42.0 (5.6)	29.4 (−1.4)	19.2 (−7.1)	41.9 (5.6)
Mean daily minimum °F (°C)	6.5 (−14.2)	8.7 (−12.9)	18.7 (−7.4)	27.8 (−2.3)	37.6 (3.1)	47.4 (8.6)	53.0 (11.7)	52.0 (11.1)	42.1 (5.6)	29.2 (−1.6)	17.8 (−7.9)	8.5 (−13.1)	29.1 (−1.6)
Mean minimum °F (°C)	−19.1 (−28.4)	−15.0 (−26.1)	−3.5 (−19.7)	11.6 (−11.3)	23.1 (−4.9)	34.6 (1.4)	42.1 (5.6)	38.6 (3.7)	24.7 (−4.1)	10.4 (−12.0)	−4.9 (−20.5)	−19.6 (−28.7)	−27.9 (−33.3)
Record low °F (°C)	−46 (−43)	−41 (−41)	−34 (−37)	−8 (−22)	11 (−12)	24 (−4)	33 (1)	28 (−2)	10 (−12)	−14 (−26)	−26 (−32)	−38 (−39)	−46 (−43)
Average precipitation inches (mm)	0.38 (9.7)	0.53 (13)	0.46 (12)	1.44 (37)	2.72 (69)	2.35 (60)	2.11 (54)	1.16 (29)	1.42 (36)	1.07 (27)	0.45 (11)	0.51 (13)	14.60 (371)
Average snowfall inches (cm)	4.8 (12)	4.7 (12)	3.5 (8.9)	2.4 (6.1)	0.3 (0.76)	0.0 (0.0)	0.0 (0.0)	0.0 (0.0)	0.0 (0.0)	0.8 (2.0)	3.0 (7.6)	4.2 (11)	23.7 (60.36)
Average precipitation days (≥ 0.01 in)	2.6	3.6	3.1	5.1	7.8	8.1	6.5	4.1	4.2	4.4	2.8	2.6	54.9
Average snowy days (≥ 0.1 in)	2.1	2.6	1.6	1.0	0.1	0.0	0.0	0.0	0.0	0.3	1.4	2.1	11.2
Source 1: NOAA
Source 2: National Weather Service (mean maxima/minima 1981–2010)
