= Alzada, Montana =

Unincorporated community in the United States

- Census-designated place
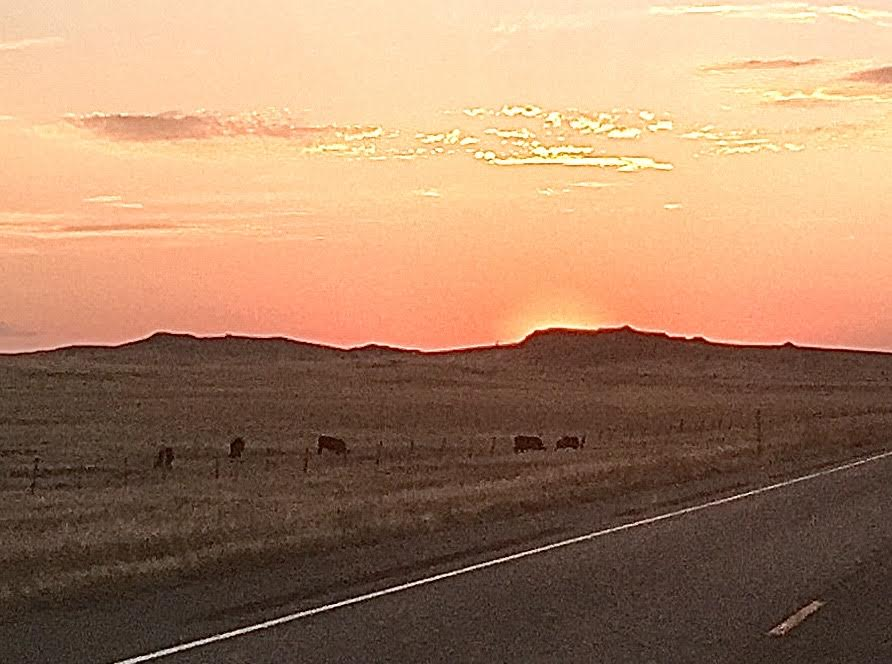
- Looking West From US Highway 212

- Location within Montana Location within the United States
- Coordinates: 45°01′14″N 104°24′46″W
- Country: United States
- State: Montana
- County: Carter

Area
  - Total: 0.51 sq mi (1.33 km^{2})
  - Land: 0.51 sq mi (1.33 km^{2})
  - Water: 0 sq mi (0.00 km^{2})
- Elevation: 3,438 ft (1,048 m)

Population (2020)
  - Total: 25
  - Density: 48.7/sq mi (18.79/km^{2})
- Time zone: UTC-7 (Mountain (MST))
  - Summer (DST): UTC-6 (MDT)
- ZIP codes: 59311
- Area code: 406
- FIPS code: 30-01300
- GNIS feature ID: 2583785

Alzada (also known as Stoneville and Telegraph Point) is a census-designated place in southern Carter County, Montana, United States. As of the 2020 census, Alzada had a population of 25. It is located at the intersection of U.S. Route 212 with Montana Secondary Highways 323 and 326, near the Wyoming and South Dakota borders. The town is also the southeastern most settlement in the state of Montana. The Little Missouri River flows northwards to the west of the community. Alzada is in the Mountain Time Zone.

== History ==
Alzada was first established in 1878, by 9th U.S. Infantry soldiers as Camp Devin, on the Deadwood, Dakota Territory to Fort Keogh, Montana Territory telegraph line. It was called the Little Missouri River Telegraph Station, and manned by soldiers of the 7th U.S. Cavalry. Then it was named Stoneville, after the local bartender Lou Stone. It served as a stagecoach stop between Deadwood and Miles City, Montana. It was the site of a gun battle in 1884 between local authorities and rustlers known as the Axleby gang. The town's name was changed from Stoneville in 1885, because of confusion with another similarly named community. The name "Alzada" came from an early settler named Laura Alzada Shelden. Later settlers of the area were largely homesteaders.

In 1890, Private Peter Thompson, a 7th Cavalry survivor and recipient of the Medal of Honor for the Battle of the Little Bighorn, moved from Lead, Dakota Territory, with his brother William and homesteaded north of Alzada on the Little Missouri River at Nine Mile Creek.

Alzada was briefly in the news in September 1997, when a B-1 bomber crashed nearby.

== Climate ==
According to the Köppen Climate Classification system, Alzada has a semi-arid climate, abbreviated "BSk" on climate maps.

There is a weather station located in the nearby community of Albion.

Climate data for Albion 1 N, Montana, 1991–2020 normals, 1945-2020 extremes: 3312ft (1009m)
Month	Jan	Feb	Mar	Apr	May	Jun	Jul	Aug	Sep	Oct	Nov	Dec	Year
Record high °F (°C)	67 (19)	73 (23)	81 (27)	91 (33)	98 (37)	106 (41)	108 (42)	107 (42)	104 (40)	95 (35)	80 (27)	69 (21)	108 (42)
Mean maximum °F (°C)	50.4 (10.2)	54.1 (12.3)	67.9 (19.9)	77.2 (25.1)	86.0 (30.0)	92.0 (33.3)	99.4 (37.4)	98.0 (36.7)	94.7 (34.8)	81.4 (27.4)	67.2 (19.6)	52.4 (11.3)	99.9 (37.7)
Mean daily maximum °F (°C)	28.7 (−1.8)	31.7 (−0.2)	42.8 (6.0)	53.3 (11.8)	64.1 (17.8)	74.9 (23.8)	84.4 (29.1)	83.0 (28.3)	72.9 (22.7)	55.7 (13.2)	42.1 (5.6)	30.9 (−0.6)	55.4 (13.0)
Daily mean °F (°C)	16.0 (−8.9)	18.6 (−7.4)	28.6 (−1.9)	38.8 (3.8)	49.6 (9.8)	59.9 (15.5)	67.4 (19.7)	65.4 (18.6)	54.9 (12.7)	40.0 (4.4)	27.5 (−2.5)	17.4 (−8.1)	40.3 (4.6)
Mean daily minimum °F (°C)	3.3 (−15.9)	5.6 (−14.7)	14.4 (−9.8)	24.2 (−4.3)	35.2 (1.8)	44.8 (7.1)	50.4 (10.2)	47.7 (8.7)	37.0 (2.8)	24.4 (−4.2)	13.0 (−10.6)	3.8 (−15.7)	25.3 (−3.7)
Mean minimum °F (°C)	−17.5 (−27.5)	−13.6 (−25.3)	−3.3 (−19.6)	13.0 (−10.6)	23.3 (−4.8)	36.3 (2.4)	44.0 (6.7)	39.4 (4.1)	27.4 (−2.6)	11.5 (−11.4)	−4.4 (−20.2)	−13.8 (−25.4)	−25.7 (−32.1)
Record low °F (°C)	−39 (−39)	−37 (−38)	−36 (−38)	−4 (−20)	8 (−13)	26 (−3)	33 (1)	28 (−2)	12 (−11)	−15 (−26)	−30 (−34)	−38 (−39)	−39 (−39)
Average precipitation inches (mm)	0.27 (6.9)	0.48 (12)	1.03 (26)	1.62 (41)	3.14 (80)	3.03 (77)	1.90 (48)	1.95 (50)	1.09 (28)	1.32 (34)	0.31 (7.9)	0.42 (11)	16.56 (421.8)
Average snowfall inches (cm)	2.60 (6.6)	7.30 (18.5)	5.70 (14.5)	3.00 (7.6)	1.40 (3.6)	0.00 (0.00)	0.00 (0.00)	0.00 (0.00)	0.00 (0.00)	1.60 (4.1)	3.30 (8.4)	3.70 (9.4)	28.6 (72.7)
Source 1: NOAA
Source 2: XMACIS (temp records & monthly max/mins)

== Demographics ==
Historical population
Census	Pop.	Note	%±
2020	25		—
U.S. Decennial Census

== See also ==
- List of census-designated places in Montana
