= Pendroy, Montana =

- Unincorporated community
- Location within Montana Location within the United States
- Coordinates: 48°04′23″N 112°17′57″W
- Country: United States
- State: Montana
- County: Teton

Area
  - Total: 0.17 sq mi (0.43 km^{2})
  - Land: 0.17 sq mi (0.43 km^{2})
  - Water: 0 sq mi (0.00 km^{2})
- Elevation: 4,272 ft (1,302 m)

Population (2020)
  - Total: 25
  - Density: 150.2/sq mi (57.98/km^{2})
- Time zone: UTC-7 (Mountain (MST))
  - Summer (DST): UTC-6 (MDT)
- ZIP code: 59467
- Area code: 406
- GNIS feature ID: 2806671U.S. Geological Survey Geographic Names Information System: Pendroy, Montana

Pendroy is an unincorporated community in Teton County, Montana, United States. Its ZIP code is 59467. As of the 2020 census, Pendroy had a population of 25.

Established with the construction of the Great Northern Railway, the town boasted a depot, roundhouse, and section house by 1916. It is named for nearby homesteader Levi "Boots" Pendroy, friend of railway founder James J. Hill.

== Demographics ==
Historical population
Census	Pop.	Note	%±
2020	25		—
U.S. Decennial Census
