= Plevna, Montana =

- Town
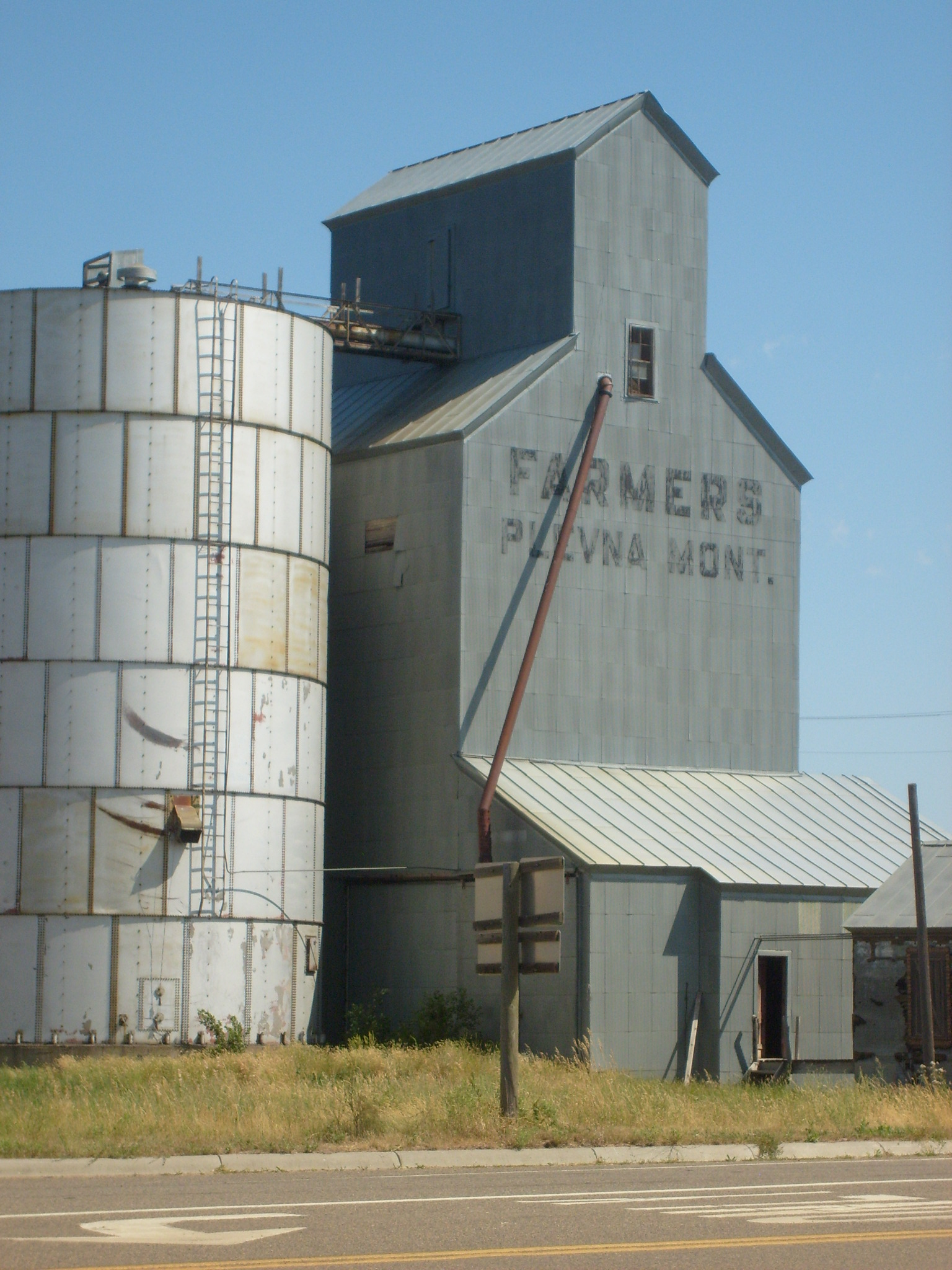
- Grain Elevator in Plevna

- Location of Plevna, Montana
- Coordinates: 46°25′06″N 104°31′07″W
- Country: United States
- State: Montana
- County: Fallon
- Established: 1909

Area
  - Total: 0.59 sq mi (1.53 km^{2})
  - Land: 0.59 sq mi (1.53 km^{2})
  - Water: 0 sq mi (0.00 km^{2})
- Elevation: 2,772 ft (845 m)

Population (2020)
  - Total: 179
  - Density: 303.7/sq mi (117.26/km^{2})
- Time zone: UTC-7 (Mountain (MST))
  - Summer (DST): UTC-6 (MDT)
- ZIP code: 59344
- Area code: 406
- FIPS code: 30-58450
- GNIS feature ID: 2412491
- Website: www.plevnamontana.us

Plevna is a town in Fallon County, Montana, United States. The population was 179 at the 2020 census.

Plevna was founded in 1909 along the Milwaukee Road transcontinental rail line known as the Pacific Extension. Bulgarian railroad workers named the town after the city of Pleven in Bulgaria.

== Geography ==
U.S. Route 12 passes through town. It is 12 miles from Baker.

According to the United States Census Bureau, the town has a total area of 0.59 square miles (1.53 km^{2}), all land.

=== Climate ===
According to the Köppen Climate Classification system, Plevna has a semi-arid climate, abbreviated "BSk" on climate maps.

Climate data for Plevna, Montana, 1991–2020 normals, extremes 1910–present
Month	Jan	Feb	Mar	Apr	May	Jun	Jul	Aug	Sep	Oct	Nov	Dec	Year
Record high °F (°C)	66 (19)	70 (21)	81 (27)	92 (33)	100 (38)	110 (43)	111 (44)	110 (43)	105 (41)	94 (34)	79 (26)	70 (21)	111 (44)
Mean maximum °F (°C)	51.7 (10.9)	54.1 (12.3)	69.2 (20.7)	78.0 (25.6)	85.2 (29.6)	92.4 (33.6)	99.0 (37.2)	98.4 (36.9)	94.5 (34.7)	81.6 (27.6)	66.2 (19.0)	53.1 (11.7)	101.1 (38.4)
Mean daily maximum °F (°C)	29.9 (−1.2)	33.3 (0.7)	45.3 (7.4)	56.7 (13.7)	67.0 (19.4)	76.8 (24.9)	86.3 (30.2)	85.5 (29.7)	75.1 (23.9)	58.1 (14.5)	43.2 (6.2)	32.4 (0.2)	57.5 (14.1)
Daily mean °F (°C)	18.0 (−7.8)	21.8 (−5.7)	32.8 (0.4)	43.4 (6.3)	53.7 (12.1)	63.4 (17.4)	71.2 (21.8)	69.8 (21.0)	59.6 (15.3)	44.7 (7.1)	31.0 (−0.6)	20.5 (−6.4)	44.2 (6.7)
Mean daily minimum °F (°C)	6.2 (−14.3)	10.2 (−12.1)	20.3 (−6.5)	30.1 (−1.1)	40.5 (4.7)	50.0 (10.0)	56.1 (13.4)	54.0 (12.2)	44.1 (6.7)	31.3 (−0.4)	18.9 (−7.3)	8.6 (−13.0)	30.9 (−0.6)
Mean minimum °F (°C)	−23.3 (−30.7)	−14.7 (−25.9)	−5.0 (−20.6)	12.9 (−10.6)	24.0 (−4.4)	36.5 (2.5)	44.4 (6.9)	39.3 (4.1)	27.6 (−2.4)	11.7 (−11.3)	−5.8 (−21.0)	−18.3 (−27.9)	−29.7 (−34.3)
Record low °F (°C)	−52 (−47)	−45 (−43)	−32 (−36)	−9 (−23)	7 (−14)	23 (−5)	35 (2)	27 (−3)	12 (−11)	−16 (−27)	−32 (−36)	−45 (−43)	−52 (−47)
Average precipitation inches (mm)	0.48 (12)	0.50 (13)	0.70 (18)	1.55 (39)	2.90 (74)	2.65 (67)	1.86 (47)	1.35 (34)	1.48 (38)	1.16 (29)	0.58 (15)	0.43 (11)	15.64 (397)
Average snowfall inches (cm)	5.9 (15)	5.6 (14)	5.4 (14)	4.8 (12)	1.3 (3.3)	0.0 (0.0)	0.0 (0.0)	0.0 (0.0)	0.1 (0.25)	2.0 (5.1)	4.1 (10)	5.0 (13)	34.2 (86.65)
Average precipitation days (≥ 0.01 in)	6.5	6.5	6.7	8.3	12.4	12.1	9.1	7.3	6.9	8.4	5.5	6.2	95.9
Average snowy days (≥ 0.1 in)	5.6	5.5	3.8	2.2	0.5	0.0	0.0	0.0	0.1	1.3	3.2	5.3	27.5
Source 1: NOAA
Source 2: National Weather Service

== Demographics ==
Historical population
Census	Pop.	Note	%±
1920	241		—
1930	258		7.1%
1940	291		12.8%
1950	247		−15.1%
1960	263		6.5%
1970	189		−28.1%
1980	191		1.1%
1990	140		−26.7%
2000	138		−1.4%
2010	162		17.4%
2020	179		10.5%
U.S. Decennial Census

=== 2010 census ===
As of the census of 2010, there were 162 people, 65 households, and 41 families residing in the town. The population density was 274.6 inhabitants per square mile (106.0/km^{2}). There were 77 housing units at an average density of 130.5 per square mile (50.4/km^{2}). The racial makeup of the town was 95.7% White, 0.6% African American, 1.9% Asian, 0.6% from other races, and 1.2% from two or more races. Hispanic or Latino of any race were 1.9% of the population.

There were 65 households, of which 35.4% had children under the age of 18 living with them, 60.0% were married couples living together, 1.5% had a female householder with no husband present, 1.5% had a male householder with no wife present, and 36.9% were non-families. 32.3% of all households were made up of individuals, and 16.9% had someone living alone who was 65 years of age or older. The average household size was 2.49 and the average family size was 3.24.

The median age in the town was 37.3 years. 30.2% of residents were under the age of 18; 4.3% were between the ages of 18 and 24; 22.9% were from 25 to 44; 24% were from 45 to 64; and 18.5% were 65 years of age or older. The gender makeup of the town was 47.5% male and 52.5% female.

=== 2000 census ===
As of the census of 2000, there were 138 people, 63 households, and 40 families residing in the town. The population density was 301.4 inhabitants per square mile (116.4/km^{2}). There were 81 housing units at an average density of 176.9 per square mile (68.3/km^{2}). The racial makeup of the town was 97.83% White and 2.17% Asian. Hispanic or Latino of any race were 1.45% of the population.

There were 63 households, out of which 30.2% had children under the age of 18 living with them, 54.0% were married couples living together, 3.2% had a female householder with no husband present, and 36.5% were non-families. 34.9% of all households were made up of individuals, and 14.3% had someone living alone who was 65 years of age or older. The average household size was 2.19 and the average family size was 2.78.

In the town, the population was spread out, with 24.6% under the age of 18, 2.9% from 18 to 24, 31.2% from 25 to 44, 21.7% from 45 to 64, and 19.6% who were 65 years of age or older. The median age was 40 years. For every 100 females there were 115.6 males. For every 100 females age 18 and over, there were 108.0 males.

The median income for a household in the town was $27,917, and the median income for a family was $33,333. Males had a median income of $26,875 versus $21,667 for females. The per capita income for the town was $14,360. There were 6.5% of families and 8.3% of the population living below the poverty line, including 16.7% of under eighteens and none of those over 64.

== Education ==
Plevna School District educates students from kindergarten through 12th grade. They are known as the Cougars. Plevna High School is a Class C school (less than 108 students) which helps determine athletic competitions.

== Notable people ==
- Vedie Himsl, baseball coach and scout, was born here. Himsl coached for the Chicago Cubs from 1960-1964.
