= Whitetail, Montana =

Coordinates: 48°53′42″N 105°09′50″W

- Census-Designated Place
- Interactive map of Whitetail, Montana
- Country: United States
- State: Montana
- County: Daniels

Area
  - Total: 0.14 sq mi (0.36 km^{2})
  - Land: 0.14 sq mi (0.36 km^{2})
  - Water: 0 sq mi (0.00 km^{2})
- Elevation: 2,500 ft (760 m)

Population (2020)
  - Total: 9
  - Density: 65.0/sq mi (25.11/km^{2})
- FIPS code: 30-80125
- GNIS feature ID: 2804280

Whitetail is a small, unincorporated village in northern Daniels County, Montana, United States. As of the 2020 census, Whitetail had a population of 9.

The area was first used as a camp along a cattle-driving route in the 1880s. The town grew with the arrival of the Soo Line Railroad in 1914. The line was planned for extension all the way to Glacier National Park, but work was stopped during World War I and the line never went any farther than Whitetail. At its peak the town had more than 500 residents, declining to 248 in 1940 and 125 in 1970. The town's chief industry was the manufacture of silo blowers from 1940, but the plant closed, followed by Whitetail High School in 1940 and the grade school in 1973.

The small checkpoint along Montana's border with Canada, which served about three travelers every day, was set to receive $15 million for upgrades under President Barack Obama's economic stimulus plan. On April 1, 2011, Canada closed its border to northbound traffic through Whitetail. The US followed suit and closed the southbound crossing on January 25, 2013.

A dam along Whitetail Creek forms Whitetail Reservoir.

== Demographics ==
Historical population
Census	Pop.	Note	%±
2020	9		—
U.S. Decennial Census
