= Waterloo, Montana =

- Town
- Location within Montana Location within the United States
- Coordinates: 45.7219°N 112.1922°W
- Country: United States
- State: Montana
- County: Madison
- First settled: 1864
- Elevation: 4,463 ft (1,360 m)

Waterloo is a one-road town (Waterloo Road) located on the northern edge of Madison County, Montana, United States, on the Jefferson River. Waterloo is equidistant between Whitehall, Montana and Twin Bridges, Montana. Abutting the Tobacco Root Mountains, Waterloo has an elevation of 4,463 feet (1,360 m).

The town of what was to become known as Waterloo was settled in 1864. The origin of its name is unclear, but one story posits that contention over the location of a post office to be built in the town was reminiscent of the Battle of Waterloo. The post office opened in the area in 1900, and closed in 1971.
