= Bainville, Montana =

- Town
- Location of Bainville, Montana
- Coordinates: 48°09′46″N 104°14′12″W
- Country: United States
- State: Montana
- County: Roosevelt

Area
  - Total: 1.26 sq mi (3.27 km^{2})
  - Land: 1.26 sq mi (3.27 km^{2})
  - Water: 0 sq mi (0.00 km^{2})
- Elevation: 1,965 ft (599 m)

Population (2020)
  - Total: 271
  - Density: 214.3/sq mi (82.76/km^{2})
- Time zone: UTC-7 (Mountain (MST))
  - Summer (DST): UTC-6 (MDT)
- ZIP code: 59212
- Area code: 406
- FIPS code: 30-03400
- GNIS feature ID: 2411660
- Website: townofbainville.com

Bainville is a town in Roosevelt County, Montana, United States. The population was 271 at the 2020 census. It is named for Charles M. Bain, an early resident and the town's first postmaster. Bainville celebrated its centennial on July 4, 2006.

== Geography ==
According to the United States Census Bureau, the town has a total area of 1.02 square miles (2.64 km^{2}), all land.

== Demographics ==
Historical population
Census	Pop.	Note	%±
1920	396		—
1930	471		18.9%
1940	403		−14.4%
1950	356		−11.7%
1960	285		−19.9%
1970	217		−23.9%
1980	245		12.9%
1990	165		−32.7%
2000	153		−7.3%
2010	208		35.9%
2020	271		30.3%
U.S. Decennial Census

=== 2010 census ===
As of the census of 2010, there were 208 people, 85 households, and 52 families living in the town. The population density was 203.9 inhabitants per square mile (78.7/km^{2}). There were 95 housing units at an average density of 93.1 per square mile (35.9/km^{2}). The racial makeup of the town was 85.6% White, 11.1% Native American, and 3.4% from two or more races. Hispanic or Latino of any race were 0.5% of the population.

There were 85 households, of which 38.8% had children under the age of 18 living with them, 48.2% were married couples living together, 7.1% had a female householder with no husband present, 5.9% had a male householder with no wife present, and 38.8% were non-families. 34.1% of all households were made up of individuals, and 11.8% had someone living alone who was 65 years of age or older. The average household size was 2.45 and the average family size was 3.17.

The median age in the town was 30.8 years. 34.1% of residents were under the age of 18; 4.9% were between the ages of 18 and 24; 25.9% were from 25 to 44; 24.1% were from 45 to 64; and 11.1% were 65 years of age or older. The gender makeup of the town was 52.4% male and 47.6% female.

=== 2000 census ===
As of the census of 2000, there were 153 people, 72 households, and 43 families living in the town. The population density was 147.9 inhabitants per square mile (57.1/km^{2}). There were 83 housing units at an average density of 80.2 per square mile (31.0/km^{2}). The racial makeup of the town was 89.54% White, 5.23% Native American, and 5.23% from two or more races. Hispanic or Latino of any race were 0.65% of the population.

There were 72 households, out of which 23.6% had children under the age of 18 living with them, 54.2% were married couples living together, 4.2% had a female householder with no husband present, and 38.9% were non-families. 37.5% of all households were made up of individuals, and 22.2% had someone living alone who was 65 years of age or older. The average household size was 2.13 and the average family size was 2.82.

In the town, the population was spread out, with 19.6% under the age of 18, 5.9% from 18 to 24, 19.6% from 25 to 44, 28.1% from 45 to 64, and 26.8% who were 65 years of age or older. The median age was 49 years. For every 100 females there were 82.1 males. For every 100 females age 18 and over, there were 86.4 males.

The median income for a household in the town was $26,250, and the median income for a family was $29,643. Males had a median income of $27,000 versus $13,750 for females. The per capita income for the town was $14,997. About 16.7% of families and 14.8% of the population were below the poverty line, including 18.4% of those under the age of eighteen and 9.1% of those 65 or over.

== Transportation ==
Amtrak’s Empire Builder, which operates between Seattle/Portland and Chicago, passes through the town on BNSF tracks, but makes no stop. The nearest station is located in Williston, 28 miles (45 km) to the east.

== Education ==
Bainville Public School educates students from kindergarten through 12th grade. Bainville High School is known as the Bulldogs.

== See also ==
- List of cities and towns in Montana
