= Molt, Montana =

- Unincorporated community
- Location within Montana Location within the United States
- Coordinates: 45°51′41″N 108°55′40″W
- Country: United States
- State: Montana
- County: Stillwater

Government
  - mayor: Chase Keating
- Elevation: 3,966 ft (1,209 m)

Population (2010)
  - Total: 597
- Time zone: UTC-7 (Mountain (MST))
  - Summer (DST): UTC-6 (MDT)
- ZIP code: 59057
- Area code: 406
- GNIS feature ID: 777090

Molt is an unincorporated rural village located in Stillwater County, Montana, United States, which has a post office ZIP code (59057) and several granaries. A hardware store still stands, which stood as the Prairie Winds cafe for many years; today the building remains unoccupied.

The village elevation is 3,966 feet. Molt appears on the Molt U.S. Geological Survey Map.

== History ==
Molt thrived as a busy and well developed agricultural community on the edge of Yellowstone County. Several large grain elevators were erected and a few historic buildings are still standing today. The Northern Pacific Railway had a stop in Molt en route to Hesper, Wheat Basin and Rapelje, Montana.

Although the town has declined significantly with the withdrawal of the railroad, a few of its elevators are still in operation.

A post office was first established in the Molt area in 1909. The office was originally known as Stickley and was located on a nearby ranch. In 1918, the office was moved to town and the name changed to Molt (named for the person who donated the land for the townsite).
