= Raynesford, Montana =

- Unincorporated community and census-designated place
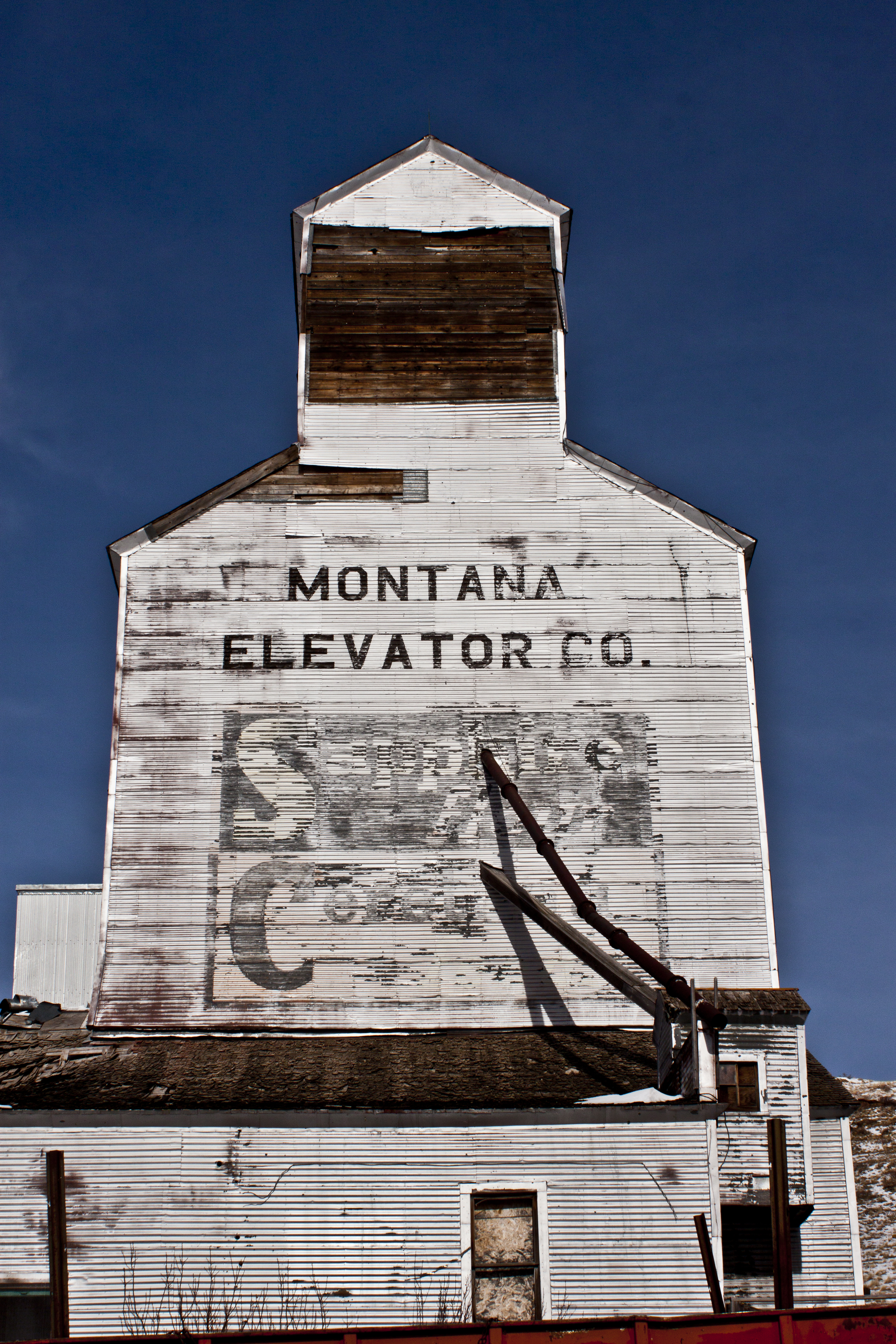
- The Historic Montana Elevator Co. elevator next to the tracks.
- Interactive map of Raynesford, Montana
- Coordinates: 47°16′12″N 110°43′48″W
- Country: United States
- State: Montana
- County: Judith Basin

Area
  - Total: 0.10 sq mi (0.26 km^{2})
  - Land: 0.10 sq mi (0.26 km^{2})
  - Water: 0 sq mi (0.00 km^{2})
- Elevation: 4,042 ft (1,232 m)

Population (2020)
  - Total: 31
  - Density: 310.6/sq mi (119.91/km^{2})
- FIPS code: 30-61300
- GNIS feature ID: 789423

Raynesford is an unincorporated community in Judith Basin County, Montana, United States. As of the 2020 census, Raynesford had a population of 31. The community includes a community center, a catholic church, a fire department, and a post office. The post office was established under the name of "Spion Kop" on March 31, 1906; its name was changed to Raynesford exactly three years later.

U.S. Route 87 runs along the southern side of town. Montana Highway 217's southern terminus intersects Stanford. Big Otter Creek flows through town.

Nearby Sluice Boxes State Park provides rugged recreation. It is a former mining area located along the Belt Creek Canyon.

== Demographics ==
Historical population
| Census | Pop. | Note | %± |
|---|---|---|---|
| 2020 | 31 | | — |
U.S. Decennial Census

== Climate ==
According to the Köppen Climate Classification system, Raynesford has a semi-arid climate, abbreviated "BSk" on climate maps.

== Media ==
The Judith Basin Press is the local newspaper. It is published weekly.
