= Carlyle, Montana =

Location in Montana, USA

Coordinates: 46°39′18″N 104°04′34″W

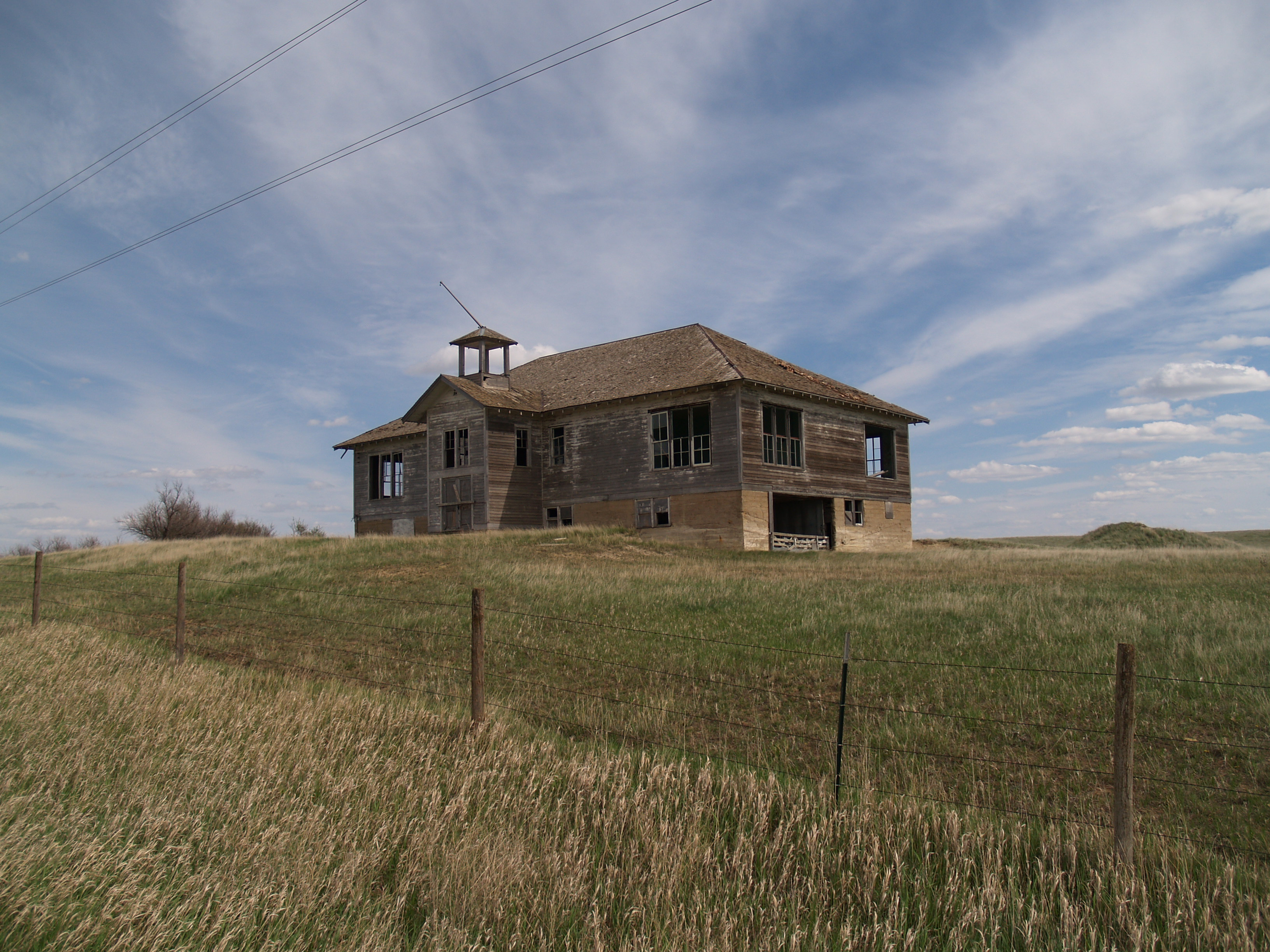
Former school in Carlyle

Carlyle is a ghost town in Wibaux County, Montana, United States. The community is located approximately 1 to 1 1/2 miles west of the North Dakota border, sitting on a ranch, which incorporated the once agricultural town into grazing land. Southeast of the town of Carlyle is the cemetery. Carlyle had a population of 221 in the 1940s, with access to the Northern Pacific Railway branch out of Beach, North Dakota.

== Climate ==
According to the Köppen Climate Classification system, Carlyle has a warm-summer humid continental climate, abbreviated "Dfb" on climate maps. The hottest temperature recorded in Carlyle was 107 °F (41.7 °C) on June 20, 1988, while the coldest temperature recorded was −39 °F (−39.4 °C) on December 21, 1989.

Climate data for Carlyle, Montana, 1991–2020 normals, extremes 1962–present
Month	Jan	Feb	Mar	Apr	May	Jun	Jul	Aug	Sep	Oct	Nov	Dec	Year
Record high °F (°C)	62 (17)	69 (21)	81 (27)	91 (33)	99 (37)	107 (42)	106 (41)	105 (41)	103 (39)	92 (33)	78 (26)	65 (18)	107 (42)
Mean maximum °F (°C)	48.2 (9.0)	51.0 (10.6)	67.0 (19.4)	77.3 (25.2)	84.2 (29.0)	90.6 (32.6)	97.4 (36.3)	97.7 (36.5)	92.9 (33.8)	79.7 (26.5)	63.4 (17.4)	50.7 (10.4)	100.0 (37.8)
Mean daily maximum °F (°C)	26.7 (−2.9)	29.8 (−1.2)	41.6 (5.3)	53.0 (11.7)	63.4 (17.4)	73.0 (22.8)	82.2 (27.9)	82.4 (28.0)	71.3 (21.8)	55.0 (12.8)	40.4 (4.7)	29.6 (−1.3)	54.0 (12.3)
Daily mean °F (°C)	18.0 (−7.8)	20.8 (−6.2)	31.3 (−0.4)	41.8 (5.4)	52.0 (11.1)	61.7 (16.5)	69.4 (20.8)	68.8 (20.4)	58.8 (14.9)	44.2 (6.8)	31.1 (−0.5)	21.2 (−6.0)	43.3 (6.3)
Mean daily minimum °F (°C)	9.4 (−12.6)	11.7 (−11.3)	21.0 (−6.1)	30.5 (−0.8)	40.6 (4.8)	50.4 (10.2)	56.6 (13.7)	55.3 (12.9)	46.2 (7.9)	33.3 (0.7)	21.8 (−5.7)	12.8 (−10.7)	32.5 (0.3)
Mean minimum °F (°C)	−17.7 (−27.6)	−12.2 (−24.6)	−3.0 (−19.4)	13.8 (−10.1)	27.1 (−2.7)	38.6 (3.7)	46.9 (8.3)	42.9 (6.1)	30.6 (−0.8)	15.0 (−9.4)	−0.3 (−17.9)	−12.5 (−24.7)	−23.1 (−30.6)
Record low °F (°C)	−38 (−39)	−35 (−37)	−26 (−32)	−8 (−22)	13 (−11)	30 (−1)	34 (1)	31 (−1)	15 (−9)	−8 (−22)	−23 (−31)	−39 (−39)	−39 (−39)
Average precipitation inches (mm)	0.54 (14)	0.58 (15)	0.80 (20)	1.64 (42)	2.62 (67)	2.53 (64)	2.27 (58)	1.37 (35)	1.69 (43)	1.41 (36)	0.70 (18)	0.60 (15)	16.75 (427)
Average snowfall inches (cm)	9.2 (23)	9.6 (24)	9.3 (24)	5.8 (15)	2.4 (6.1)	0.0 (0.0)	0.0 (0.0)	0.0 (0.0)	0.1 (0.25)	3.7 (9.4)	6.9 (18)	8.3 (21)	55.3 (140.75)
Average precipitation days (≥ 0.01 in)	7.6	8.4	8.6	8.9	11.6	11.1	8.7	7.1	6.9	8.4	7.4	8.0	102.7
Average snowy days (≥ 0.1 in)	6.5	7.7	5.5	3.0	0.8	0.0	0.0	0.0	0.1	2.2	4.7	6.2	36.7
Source 1: NOAA
Source 2: National Weather Service
