= Del Bonita, Montana =

Unincorporated community in Montana, U.S.

Del Bonita, also known as Port of Del Bonita, is an unincorporated community in Glacier County, Montana, United States. Its elevation is 4,363 feet (1,330 m) and it is located at 48°59′53″N 112°47′17″W. It is on the Canada–United States border, south of Del Bonita, Alberta, and is connected to its Canadian counterpart by the Del Bonita Border Crossing.

== Climate ==
This climatic region is typified by large seasonal temperature differences, with warm to hot (and often humid) summers and cold (sometimes severely cold) winters. According to the Köppen Climate Classification system, Del Bonita has a humid continental climate, abbreviated "Dfb" on climate maps.

Climate data for Del Bonita, Montana, 1991–2020 normals, extremes 1960–2013: 4,337 feet (1,322 m)
Month	Jan	Feb	Mar	Apr	May	Jun	Jul	Aug	Sep	Oct	Nov	Dec	Year
Record high °F (°C)	62 (17)	69 (21)	75 (24)	83 (28)	90 (32)	91 (33)	98 (37)	100 (38)	95 (35)	83 (28)	75 (24)	60 (16)	100 (38)
Mean maximum °F (°C)	50.7 (10.4)	52.4 (11.3)	59.1 (15.1)	71.1 (21.7)	80.4 (26.9)	83.6 (28.7)	89.0 (31.7)	89.7 (32.1)	84.7 (29.3)	75.5 (24.2)	59.4 (15.2)	49.4 (9.7)	92.0 (33.3)
Mean daily maximum °F (°C)	29.5 (−1.4)	31.1 (−0.5)	38.8 (3.8)	49.8 (9.9)	61.1 (16.2)	67.4 (19.7)	76.0 (24.4)	75.8 (24.3)	66.6 (19.2)	52.5 (11.4)	37.2 (2.9)	29.6 (−1.3)	51.3 (10.7)
Daily mean °F (°C)	20.2 (−6.6)	21.9 (−5.6)	28.8 (−1.8)	38.6 (3.7)	48.6 (9.2)	55.6 (13.1)	62.4 (16.9)	61.4 (16.3)	53.5 (11.9)	41.1 (5.1)	28.4 (−2.0)	21.0 (−6.1)	40.1 (4.5)
Mean daily minimum °F (°C)	10.8 (−11.8)	12.7 (−10.7)	18.9 (−7.3)	27.4 (−2.6)	36.1 (2.3)	43.8 (6.6)	48.8 (9.3)	47.0 (8.3)	40.3 (4.6)	29.8 (−1.2)	19.7 (−6.8)	12.4 (−10.9)	29.0 (−1.7)
Mean minimum °F (°C)	−16.0 (−26.7)	−13.6 (−25.3)	−2.3 (−19.1)	11.2 (−11.6)	23.8 (−4.6)	32.8 (0.4)	37.7 (3.2)	36.1 (2.3)	26.0 (−3.3)	9.2 (−12.7)	−6.1 (−21.2)	−16.5 (−26.9)	−27.0 (−32.8)
Record low °F (°C)	−43 (−42)	−38 (−39)	−30 (−34)	−9 (−23)	7 (−14)	28 (−2)	31 (−1)	24 (−4)	11 (−12)	−11 (−24)	−28 (−33)	−48 (−44)	−48 (−44)
Average precipitation inches (mm)	0.29 (7.4)	0.51 (13)	0.47 (12)	0.91 (23)	1.98 (50)	2.95 (75)	1.49 (38)	1.12 (28)	1.46 (37)	0.76 (19)	0.61 (15)	0.51 (13)	13.06 (330.4)
Average snowfall inches (cm)	6.3 (16)	6.9 (18)	10.5 (27)	10.7 (27)	2.2 (5.6)	0.0 (0.0)	0.0 (0.0)	0.2 (0.51)	1.5 (3.8)	7.4 (19)	9.8 (25)	10.3 (26)	65.8 (167.91)
Average precipitation days (≥ 0.01 in)	4.2	4.2	4.5	6.0	7.0	8.3	6.1	5.7	5.3	4.2	4.7	5.0	65.2
Average snowy days (≥ 0.1 in)	3.8	3.8	4.3	3.3	0.6	0.0	0.0	0.1	0.7	2.5	3.6	4.2	26.9
Source 1: NOAA (snow/snow days 1981–2010)
Source 2: National Weather Service (mean maxima/minima 1981–2010)
