= Montana Highway 24 =

State highway in Montana, United States

Montana Highway 24
- MT 24 highlighted in red

Route information
- Maintained by MDT
- Length: 134.098 mi (215.810 km)

Major junctions
- South end: MT 200 near Brockway
- US 2 near Glasgow
- North end: Highway 2 at the Canadian border near Opheim

Location
- Country: United States
- State: Montana
- Counties: Garfield, McCone, Valley

Highway system
- Montana Highway System; Interstate; US; State; Secondary
← MT 23	→ MT 25

Montana Highway 24 (MT 24) is a 134-mile-long (216 km) state highway in the US state of Montana. It begins at MT 200 near Brockway, and ends at the Saskatchewan border at Port of Opheim. Along the way, it intersects MT 117, MT 42 and US Highway 2 (US 2).

== Route description ==
MT 24 begins at an intersection with MT 200 near Brockway. The route then proceeds northward through a rural area along the eastern shore of Fort Peck Lake. The highway turns to the west, crosses the Fort Peck Dam before passing through Fort Peck, Montana, and travels just yards from the northern shore of the lake. It intersects with MT 117, as it exits Fort Peck, and enters Wheeler. The highway heads northwest before turning due north. From here, it intersects MT 42, just prior to intersecting with US 2. MT 24 passes on the eastern outskirts of Glasgow, and travels near the Glasgow International Airport. It heads north-northwest, soon turning due north again before intersecting Cut Across Road, so named for its cutting across the vast open expanses of land between US 2, and MT 24. An intersection with Montana Secondary Highway 248 (S-248) follows, and MT 24 reaches its end at the Saskatchewan border, north of Port of Opheim.

== History ==
Originally, MT 24W connected MT 24 with Glasgow. A former MT 24 ran between Marion and Jennings in the 1930s, which is now known as Pleasant Valley Road.

== Major intersections ==
County	Location	mi	km	Destinations	Notes
Garfield	Flowing Wells	0.000	0.000	MT 200 – Lewistown, Circle	Southern terminus
McCone	No major junctions				
Valley	Fort Peck	59.097	95.107	MT 117 north – Fort Peck, Nashua	
Valley		73.217	117.831	MT 42 west – Glasgow	
Valley		74.659	120.152	US 2 – Glasgow, Wolf Point	
Valley	Opheim	123.639	198.978	S-248	
Valley		134.098	215.810	Canada–United States border at Opheim–West Poplar River Border Crossing	
Valley		134.098	215.810	Highway 2 north – Assiniboia, Moose Jaw	Continuation into Saskatchewan
1.000 mi = 1.609 km; 1.000 km = 0.621 mi
