= List of state highways in Montana =

Montana Highway System
- Highway markers for MT 3, MT 59, and MT 200

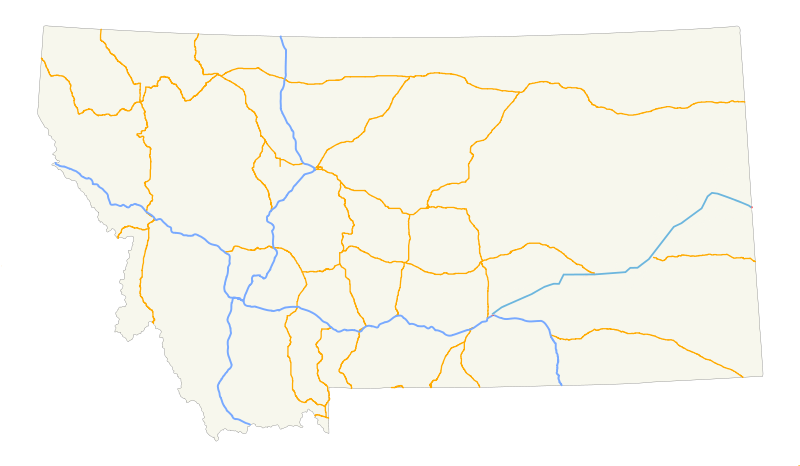
- Map of main highways within Montana

System information
- Maintained by MDT
- Formed: 1942

Highway names
- Interstates: Interstate nn (I-nn)
- US Highways: U.S. Highway n (US n)
- State: Montana Highway n (MT n)
- Secondary: Secondary Highway nnn (S-nnnn)

System links
- Montana Highway System; Interstate; US; State; Secondary

The state highways in Montana are the state highways owned and maintained by the Montana Department of Transportation (MDT) in the US state of Montana.

Montana's state highways are classified as either primary or secondary. Several of Montana's state highways (both primary and secondary), or sections thereof, have also been designated as part of the National Highway System.

== Primary state highways ==
The square markers used today to identify primary Montana highways are only slightly different from their 1940s and earlier predecessors. The old markers used the word "ROUTE" above the number in big size, the route number in the middle, and the word "MONTANA" from edge-to-edge at the sign bottom. The font used was similar to that used for US routes.

| Number | Length (mi) | Length (km) | Southern or western terminus | Northern or eastern terminus | Formed | Removed | Notes |
|---|---|---|---|---|---|---|---|
| MT 1 | — | — | US 191 near Grayling | US 10 near Sappington | — | — | Replaced by MT 287 (now US 287) |
| MT 1 | 63.652 | 102.438 | I-90 in Opportunity | I-90 in Drummond | 1922 | current | |
| MT 2 | 63.241 | 101.777 | I-90 in Butte | I-90 in Three Forks | — | — | |
| MT 3 | — | — | Idaho border near Heron | US 93 in Ravalli | — | — | Replaced by US 10 Alt |
| MT 3 | 221.770 | 356.904 | I-90 in Billings | I-15 and US 89 in Great Falls | — | — | |
| MT 4 | 24 | 39 | Idaho state line | MT 3 in Thompson Falls | — | — | decommissioned when Idaho truncated SH 4 at Burke; Replaced by Forest Service Road NF-7623 (connects to Burke) and S-471 |
| MT 5 | 65.573 | 105.530 | MT 13 in Scobey | ND 5 in Westby | — | — | |
| MT 6 | — | — | US 10 Alternate in Townsend | US 10 in Forsyth | — | — | Replaced by US 12 |
| MT 7 | 80.585 | 129.689 | S-323 in Ekalaka | I-94 in Wibaux | 1930 | current | |
| MT 8 | — | — | US 87 in Crow Agency | MT 22 near Olive | — | — | Replaced by US 212 |
| MT 9 | — | — | Lolo Pass | US 93 at Lolo | — | — | Replaced by S-412 (now US 12) |
| MT 11 | — | — | US 89 in Vaughn | Alberta border at Sweetgrass | — | 1932 | Replaced by US 91 |
| MT 11 | — | — | — | — | — | — | |
| MT 13 | 112.507 | 181.062 | MT 200 in Circle | Hwy 36 at the Saskatchewan border | — | — | |
| MT 13W | 5.797 | 9.329 | US 2 in Wolf Point | MT 13 in Bridge Park | — | 1994 | Replaced by MT 25 |
| MT 14 | — | — | US 10 at Glendive | North Dakota border at Fairview | — | — | Replaced by MT 16 and MT 23N (later MT 20; now MT 200) |
| MT 15 | — | — | US 87 in Stanford | US 2 in Chester | — | — | Replaced by S-230 (now MT 80) and S-223 |
| MT 16 | 152.371 | 245.217 | I-94 Bus. in Glendive | Hwy 6 at the Saskatchewan border | — | — | |
| MT 17 | — | — | — | — | — | — | location unknown |
| MT 17 | 14.082 | 22.663 | US 89 near Kennedy Creek | Hwy 6 at the Alberta border | — | — | |
| MT 18 | — | — | US 87 in Grass Range | US 10/MT 14 in Glendive | — | — | Replaced by MT 20 (now MT 200) and MT 20S (now MT 200S) |
| MT 19 | — | — | US 10 in Big Timber | US 2/MT 39 in Malta | — | — | Replaced by US 191 |
| MT 19 | 21.482 | 34.572 | US 87 and MT 200 near Grass Range | US 191 near Roy | — | — | |
| MT 20 | — | — | US 10 in Bonner | US 89 near Great Falls | — | — | Replaced by MT 200 |
| MT 21 | — | — | US 10 in Columbus | MT 6 at Ryegate | — | — | Replaced by S-300 and S-306 |
| MT 21 | 20.776 | 33.436 | US 287 near Augusta | MT 200 in Simms | — | — | |
| MT 22 | — | — | Wyoming border at Alzada | Saskatchewan border at Port of Ophiem | — | — | Replaced by US 212, MT 59, S-341, and MT 24 |
| MT 23 | 7.527 | 12.114 | MT 16 and MT 200 near Sidney | ND 68 at the North Dakota border | — | — | From 1951 to 1958, continued west to Circle |
| MT 23N | — | — | — | North Dakota border at Fairview | — | — | Replaced by MT 20 (now MT 200) |
| MT 23S | — | — | — | ND 68 at the North Dakota border | — | — | Replaced by MT 23 |
| MT 24 | 58 | 93 | MT 37 at Jennings | US 2 in Marion | — | — | |
| MT 24 | 134.098 | 215.810 | MT 200 near Brockway | Hwy 2 at the Saskatchewan border | — | — | |
| MT 24W | 2.892 | 4.654 | MT 24 south of Glasgow | US 2 in Glasgow | — | 1994 | Replaced by MT 42 |
| MT 25 | — | — | US 87 in Billings | US 87 in Lewistown | — | — | |
| MT 25 | 5.797 | 9.329 | US 2 in Wolf Point | MT 13 in Bridge Park | 1994 | current | |
| MT 26 | — | — | MT 3 in Trout Creek | US 2 in Kootenai National Forest | — | — | |
| MT 27 | — | — | MT 19 in Winifred | MT 29 in Big Sandy | — | — | Replaced by S-226 |
| MT 28 | 46.734 | 75.211 | MT 200 near Plains | US 93 in Elmo | 1924 | current | |
| MT 29 | — | — | US 87/US 89 in Great Falls | Port of Wildhorse | — | — | Replaced by US 87 |
| MT 30 | — | — | US 12 near Miles City | South Dakota border near Mill Iron | — | — | |
| MT 31 | — | — | US 10 in Drummond | MT 35 near Bigfork | — | — | Replaced by S-271 and MT 83 |
| MT 32 | — | — | Yellowstone National Park at Silver Gate | US 310 at Rockvale | — | — | Replaced by US 212 |
| MT 33 | — | — | US 91/MT 20 in Wolf Creek | US 89 in Choteau | — | — | Replaced by US 287 |
| MT 34 | — | — | MT 41 in Twin Bridges | MT 287 in Ennis | — | — | Replaced by rerouted MT 287 |
| MT 35 | 50.669 | 81.544 | US 93 in Polson | US 2 in Evergreen | — | — | |
| MT 36 | — | — | US 93 near Gibbons Pass | US 91 in Dillon | — | — | Replaced by MT 43 and S-278 |
| MT 37 | 67.048 | 107.903 | US 2 in Libby | US 93 in Eureka | — | — | |
| MT 38 | 53.835 | 86.639 | US 93 in Grantsdale | MT 1 in Porters Corner | 1924 | current | Skalkaho Highway |
| MT 39 | — | — | Port of Morgan at the Saskatchewan border | Hysham | — | — | Replaced by MT 19 (later S-242) and S-245 |
| MT 39 | 51.163 | 82.339 | US 212 in Lame Deer | North of I-94 near Forsyth | 1977 | current | |
| MT 40 | 4.505 | 7.250 | US 93 south of Whitefish | US 2 west of Columbia Falls | — | — | |
| MT 41 | 54.512 | 87.729 | I-15 Bus. in Dillon | MT 2 in Vendome Station | — | — | |
| MT 42 | — | — | — | — | — | — | location unknown |
| MT 42 | 2.892 | 4.654 | MT 24 south of Glasgow | US 2 in Glasgow | 1994 | current | |
| MT 43 | 77.462 | 124.663 | US 93 at Lost Trail Pass | I-15 near Divide | — | — | Last mile near western terminus with US 93 is in Idaho. |
| MT 44 | — | — | — | — | — | — | location unknown |
| MT 44 | 28.390 | 45.689 | US 89 north of Dupuyer | I-15 east of Valier | — | — | |
| MT 45 | — | — | MT 8 in Lame Deer | US 10 in Forsyth | — | — | Replaced by S-315 (now MT 39) |
| MT 46 | — | — | — | — | — | — | location unknown |
| MT 47 | 31.437 | 50.593 | I-90 in Hardin | I-94 east of Custer | — | — | |
| MT 48 | 6.839 | 11.006 | MT 1 near Anaconda | I-90 near Warm Springs | — | — | |
| MT 49 | — | — | — | — | — | — | location unknown |
| MT 49 | 11.734 | 18.884 | US 2 in East Glacier Park | US 89 north of Kiowa | — | — | |
| MT 50 | — | — | MT 13 southeast of Wolf Point | US 2 east of Wolf Point | — | — | Replaced by MT 13 |
| MT 50 | — | — | Idaho border at Raynolds Pass | US 287 west of Hebgen Lake | — | — | Replaced by MT 87 |
| MT 55 | 12.996 | 20.915 | MT 41 north of Silver Star | I-90 at Whitehall | — | — | |
| MT 56 | 34.646 | 55.757 | MT 200 west of Noxon | US 2 east of Troy | 1977 | current | |
| MT 59 | 195.389 | 314.448 | WYO 59 at the Wyoming border | MT 200 at Jordan | — | — | |
| MT 64 | 9.039 | 14.547 | Big Sky Resort | US 191 near Big Sky Resort | — | — | |
| MT 66 | 50.022 | 80.503 | US 191 south of Landusky | US 2 at Fort Belknap | — | — | |
| MT 67 | 1.755 | 2.824 | US 2 in Shelby | I-15 in Shelby | — | — | |
| MT 68 | 1.494 | 2.404 | I-15 south of Cascade | I-15 north of Cascade | — | — | |
| MT 69 | 38.395 | 61.791 | MT 55 at Whitehall | I-15 at Boulder | — | — | |
| MT 72 | 21.408 | 34.453 | WYO 120 at the Wyoming border | US 310 south of Bridger | 1977 | current | |
| MT 77 | 1.991 | 3.204 | Hot Springs | MT 28 east of Hot Springs | 1977 | current | |
| MT 78 | 47.714 | 76.788 | US 212 at Red Lodge | I-90 at Columbus | 1977 | current | |
| MT 80 | 67.172 | 108.103 | US 87 at Stanford | US 87 at Fort Benton | — | — | |
| MT 81 | 42.446 | 68.310 | MT 80 near Coffee Creek | US 191 at Brooks | — | — | |
| MT 82 | 6.862 | 11.043 | US 93 north of Somers | MT 35 north of Bigfork | 1977 | current | |
| MT 83 | 91.118 | 146.640 | MT 200 at Clearwater Junction | MT 35 north of Bigfork | 1977 | current | |
| MT 84 | 28.904 | 46.516 | US 287 in Norris | US 191/MT 85 near Four Corners | — | — | |
| MT 85 | 6.704 | 10.789 | US 191/MT 84 near Four Corners | I-90 at Belgrade | — | — | |
| MT 86 | 37.498 | 60.347 | US 191/I-90 Bus. in Bozeman | US 89 near Wilsall | — | — | |
| MT 87 | 8.571 | 13.794 | SH 87 at the Idaho border | US 287 west of Quake Lake | 1987 | current | |
| MT 110 | — | — | US 10 near Opportunity | US 10 in Drummond | — | — | Replaced by US 10 Alternate |
| MT 117 | 13.138 | 21.144 | MT 24 at Fort Peck | US 2 at Nashua | — | — | |
| MT 135 | 21.549 | 34.680 | I-90 at St. Regis | MT 200 near Paradise | 1977 | current | |
| MT 141 | 32.468 | 52.252 | US 12 at Avon | MT 200 north of Helmville | 1977 | current | |
| MT 187 | — | — | US 10 in Bozeman | US 89 in Wilsall | — | — | Replaced by S-293 (now MT 86) |
| MT 191 | — | — | US 191 near Grayling | US 10 near Sappington | — | — | Replaced by MT 1 (later MT 287, now US 287) |
| MT 200 | 706.624 | 1,137.201 | SH 200 at the Idaho border east of Cabinet, Idaho | ND 200 at Fairview | 1967 | current | Longest state highway in Montana |
| MT 287 | 48.822 | 78.571 | MT 41 at Twin Bridges | US 287 at Ennis | — | — | |
| MT 789 | — | — | Wyoming border south of Warren | Alberta border at Sweetgrass | — | — | Part of US 789 corridor |

== Special routes ==
| Number | Length (mi) | Length (km) | Southern or western terminus | Northern or eastern terminus | Formed | Removed | Notes |
|---|---|---|---|---|---|---|---|
| MT 20S | — | — | MT 20 east of Circle | US 10/I-94 Bus. in Glendive | — | — | Replaced by MT 200S |
| MT 200S | 48.674 | 78.333 | MT 200 east of Circle | I-94 Bus. in Glendive | 1967 | current | |
| MT 287A | 46 | 74 | MT 287 at Ennis | I-90/US 10 near Three Forks | 1961 | 1965 | Former section of MT 287; replaced by US 287 |
Former

== Secondary state highways ==
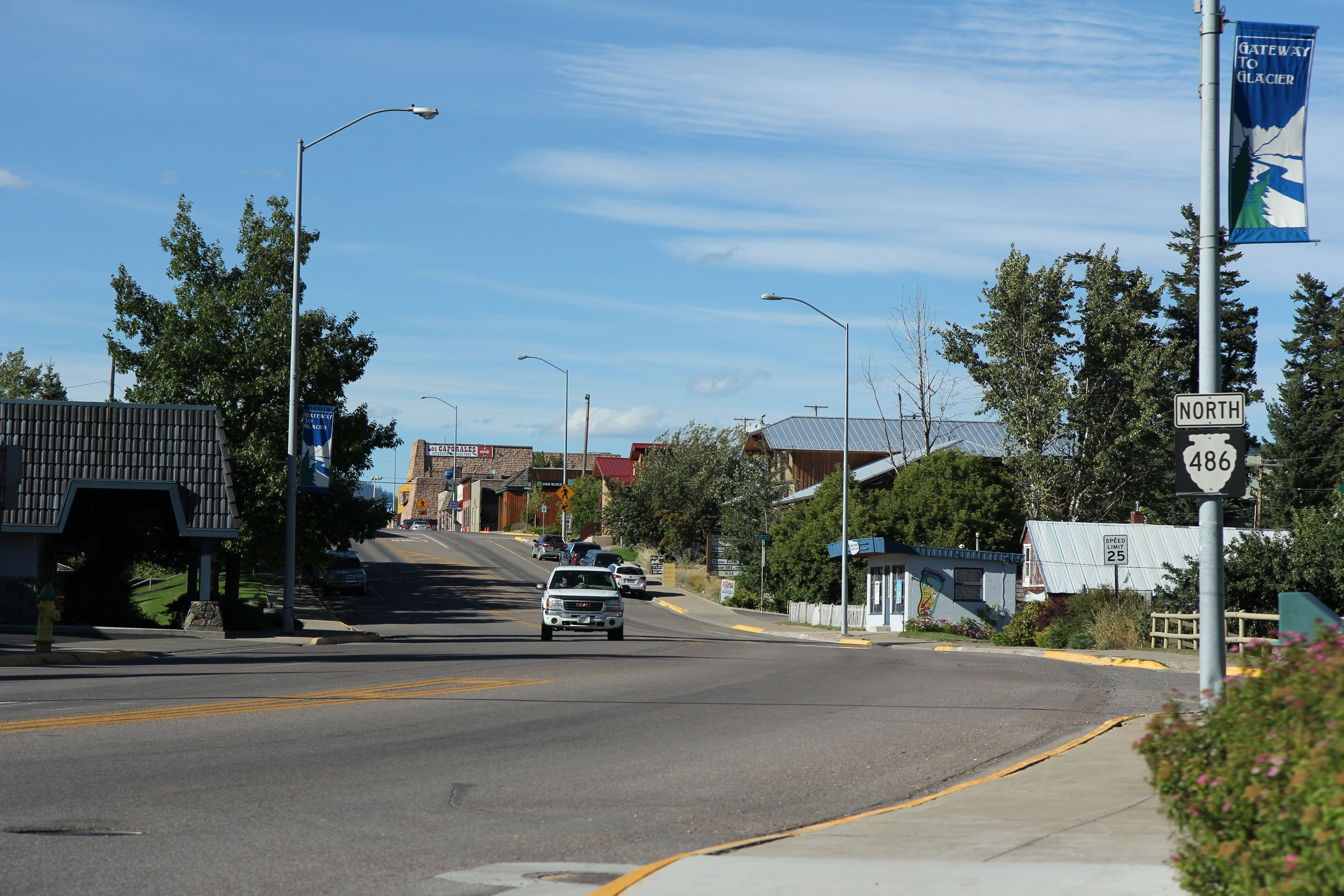
S-486 at Columbia Falls, August 2013

Montana's secondary system was established in 1942, but secondary highways (S routes) were not signed until the 1960s. S route designations first appeared on the state highway map in 1960 and are abbreviated as "S-nnn". Route numbers 201 and higher are, with very few exceptions, exclusively reserved for S routes. Notable exceptions include, MT 287, and the former MT 789.

The highway markers for Montana's Secondary Highways are distinctive in that the route number appears in black on a white down-pointing arrowhead. (Early markers were white numbers on black arrowheads with the word Montana in the flat top of the inverted arrowhead and Secondary appearing below the route number on the shields.)
