= U.S. Route 2 in Montana =

Highway in the Montana, United States

U.S. Highway 2
- US 2 highlighted in red

Route information
- Maintained by MDT
- Length: 666.645 mi (1,072.861 km)
- Existed: 1926–present

Major junctions
- West end: US 2 at the Idaho state line west of Troy
- US 93 in Kalispell; US 89 at Browning; I-15 in Shelby; US 87 near Havre; US 191 in Malta
- East end: US 2 at the North Dakota state line east of Bainville

Location
- Country: United States
- State: Montana
- Counties: Lincoln, Flathead, Glacier, Toole, Liberty, Hill, Blaine, Phillips, Valley, Roosevelt

Highway system
- United States Numbered Highway System; List; Special; Divided; Montana Highway System; Interstate; US; State; Secondary
← MT 1	→ MT 2

U.S. Highway 2 (US 2) is an east–west United States Numbered Highway in the state of Montana. It extends approximately 666.645 miles (1,072.861 km) from the Idaho state line east to the North Dakota state line.

== Route description ==
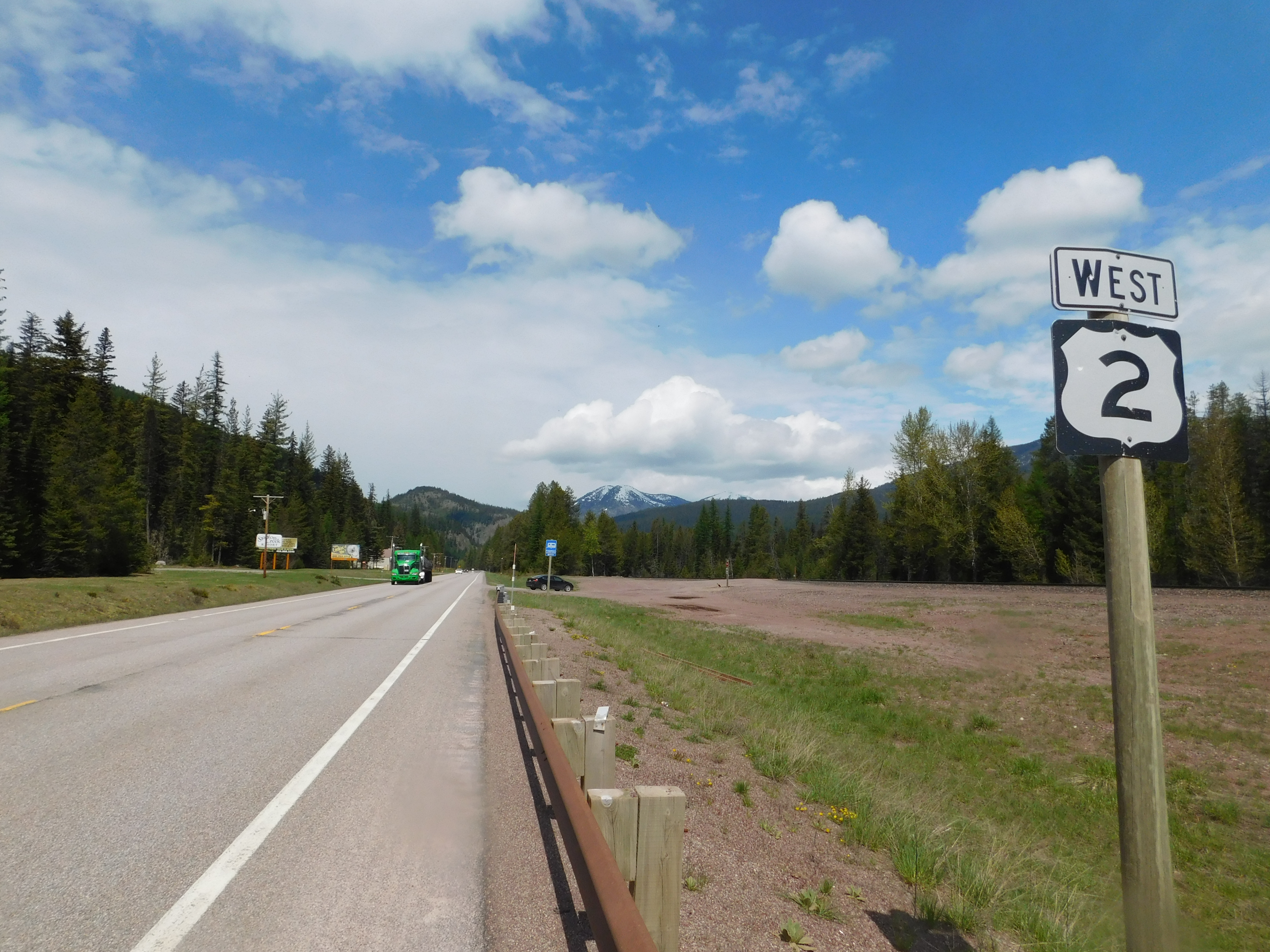
US 2 in Essex

US 2 is a vital northern corridor for Montana. The road has more of its mileage within Montana than in any other state. It passes through three Indian reservations, comes very close to two others, and skirts the southern border of Glacier National Park. Most of the Montana segment of US 2 runs alongside BNSF Railway's Northern Transcon route.

US 2 passes into Montana 10 miles (16 km) from Troy, a small town. It is also near the lowest point in Montana, where the Kootenai River leaves the state. The first large town the highway comes to is Libby. After this, it meanders south and east toward Kalispell, a city of about 25,000 residents north of Flathead Lake, the largest freshwater lake west of the Mississippi River. From there the highway passes through the southern end of Glacier National Park and follows the Middle Fork of the Flathead River and the BNSF Railway line. After crossing the Continental Divide at Marias Pass west of East Glacier, the highway exits the Rocky Mountains and begins its trek through the northern plains. Just before entering East Glacier, it crosses the boundary of the Blackfeet Nation of northern Montana.

As the highway enters the Great Plains, specifically the northern High Plains, the first town it encounters is Browning, the largest settlement in the Blackfeet Nation. From here to the North Dakota border, the area surrounding the highway and the adjacent railroad is known as the "Hi-Line" to Montanans from the early Great Northern Railway route. It next travels through Cut Bank and Shelby, where it meets Interstate 15 (I-15) and becomes the northern border of the area known as the "Golden Triangle", another colloquial region in Montana. This area is one of the most agriculturally productive in the country. From Shelby, it hits a string of small towns before it goes on to Havre, near the geographical center of the road in the state and the other northern apex of the Golden Triangle. Just south of Havre and off the highway about 15 miles (24 km) is Rocky Boy's Indian Reservation. The highway continues east to Malta, before which it travels through the Fort Belknap Indian Reservation and parallels the Milk River. From Malta, the highway continues on to Glasgow, just north of the Fort Peck Dam, and then into the Fort Peck Indian Reservation. The highway stays within the reservation for much of its remaining length through Montana and parallels the Missouri River east of the dam. On the reservation, it travels through Wolf Point and Poplar and then exits the reservation a short distance before leaving the state. The final town of Bainville is the last major town on the highway as it leaves the state, near the confluence of the Missouri and Yellowstone rivers.

== History ==
The route has remained mostly unchanged from its original routing, except to expand lanes or straighten and widen some narrow sections.

The most notable reroutings from the original corridor are: 1) the section from Moyie Springs, Idaho, to just inside the Montana border, which once ran much further north, as seen on the 1937 map of the area (Old US 2N intersects today's US 2 about 2.6 miles (4.2 km) east of the state line); 2) passing north of Kila; 3) a route swap with Secondary Highway 206 (S-206) between Evergreen and Columbia Falls in 1983 (as seen in the 1985 state map); 4) widening the highway to three or four lanes between Hungry Horse and West Glacier in 1987 (as seen on page 35 of the 2013 road log); and 5) construction of a more direct route between East Glacier and Browning over the Two Medicine River (which eliminated the concurrency with US 89 between Kiowa and Browning). All these former segments are still in use today. The former section from East Glacier to Kiowa is Montana Highway 49 (MT 49).

One former segment of the original 1926 corridor is maintained as a hiking trail, just east of the intersection with MT 56.

At Marias Pass, the Theodore Roosevelt Memorial Monument, a 60-foot-tall (18 m) obelisk patterned after the Washington Monument, was built in 1931 to honor the 25th anniversary of the U.S. Forest Service. It originally stood right in the middle of the highway, with traffic flowing around it. In 1989, it was placed in a rest area/memorial park south of the highway, and the highway at the summit was widened to four lanes to allow slower vehicles to be passed before descending the pass.

== Major intersections ==
County	Location	mi	km	Destinations	Notes
Lincoln		0.000	0.000	US 2 west – Bonners Ferry	Continuation into Idaho
Lincoln		3.764	6.058	S-508 north (Yaak River Road)	
Lincoln	Troy	16.951	27.280	MT 56 south – Thompson Falls	
Lincoln	Libby	32.387	52.122	MT 37 north (California Avenue) – Eureka	
Lincoln		35.789	57.597	S-482 south	
Lincoln		41.968	67.541	S-482 north	
Flathead		81.374	130.959	S-556 south (Thompson River Road)	
Flathead	Kalispell	119.807	192.811	US 93 Alt. – Whitefish, Missoula	Kalispell bypass; US 93 Alt. exit 4
Flathead	Kalispell	120.297	193.599	S-424 north / S-503 south (Meridian Road)	
Flathead	Kalispell	121.016	194.756	US 93 (Main Street) – Whitefish, Missoula	
Flathead	Evergreen	123.028	197.994	MT 35 south – Bigfork	
Flathead	Evergreen	124.844	200.917	Reserve Drive (S-548 west)	S-548 is unsigned; to US 93 Alt.
Flathead		134.132	215.865	MT 40 west to US 93 – Whitefish	
Flathead	Columbia Falls	136.876	220.281	S-486 north (Nucleus Avenue)	
Flathead		138.477	222.857	S-206 south	
Flathead	West Glacier	153.146	246.465	Going-to-the-Sun Road	
Flathead–Glacier county line		196.587	316.376	Marias Pass	
Glacier	East Glacier	208.143	334.974	MT 49 north (Looking Glass Hill Road) – Glacier National Park	MT 49 closed in winter
Glacier	Browning	220.505	354.868	US 89 north – St. Mary	West end of US 89 concurrency
Glacier	Browning	221.080	355.794	S-464 north	
Glacier		224.346	361.050	US 89 south – Great Falls	East end of US 89 concurrency
Glacier		235.711	379.340	S-444 north	
Glacier		253.772	408.406	S-358 south – Valier	
Glacier	Cut Bank	255.029	410.429	S-213 north	
Toole	Shelby	278.317	447.908	I-15 – Lethbridge, Great Falls I-15 BL begins	Exit 363 on I-15; west end of 1-15 Bus. concurrency
Toole	Shelby	279.310	449.506	I-15 BL north (Oilfield Avenue) – Lethbridge	East end of 1-15 Bus. concurrency
Toole		284.796	458.335	S-417 south	
Toole		303.325	488.154	S-343 north – Galata	
Liberty		319.763	514.609	S-409 north – Whitlash	
Liberty	Chester	321.713	517.747	S-223 south (5th Street W) – Fort Benton	
Liberty	Joplin	331.797	533.976	S-224 north – Joplin	
Hill	Rudyard	341.516	549.617	S-432 south (Rudyard Road S)	
Hill	Rudyard	341.848	550.151	S-255 north (Rudyard Road N)	
Hill	Gildford	353.516	568.929	S-449 north / S-448 south – Gildford	
Hill		379.169	610.213	US 87 south – Great Falls	US 87 northern terminus
Hill	Havre	382.490	615.558	S-234 south (5th Avenue) – Beaver Creek Recreation Area	
Hill	Havre	382.633	615.788	S-232 north (7th Avenue) to S-233 – Canada	
Blaine	Chinook	403.670	649.644	S-240 south (Cleveland Road) to S-529	
Blaine		405.878	653.197	S-325 north	
Blaine	Harlem	425.703	685.103	S-241 north	
Blaine	Fort Belknap Agency	428.664	689.868	MT 66 south – Hays	
Phillips	Dodson	453.247	729.430	S-204 south (Sage Road)	
Phillips		461.571	742.827	S-363 south	
Phillips	Malta	470.744	757.589	US 191 north – Loring, Swift Current	West end of US 191 concurrency
Phillips	Malta	470.948	757.917	US 191 south – Lewistown	East end of US 191 concurrency
Phillips	Saco	498.545	802.330	S-243 north	
Valley	Hinsdale	512.174	824.264	S-537 north (Montana Street)	
Valley	Glasgow	540.944	870.565	MT 42 south – Fort Peck	
Valley		543.178	874.160	MT 24 – Opheim, Fort Peck	
Valley	Nashua	555.271	893.622	MT 117 south – Fort Peck	
Valley		557.030	896.453	S-438 north	
Roosevelt		588.781	947.551	S-250 north	
Roosevelt	Wolf Point	590.055	949.601	MT 25 south – Circle	
Roosevelt		596.680	960.263	MT 13 – Scobey, Circle	
Roosevelt		616.632	992.373	S-251 north	
Roosevelt		618.625	995.580	S-480 south	
Roosevelt	Brockton	625.094	1,005.991	S-344 north	
Roosevelt	Culbertson	644.034	1,036.472	MT 16 south (Broadway) – Sidney	West end of MT 16 concurrency
Roosevelt	Culbertson	644.101	1,036.580	MT 16 north (1st Avenue E) – Plentywood, Regina	East end of MT 16 concurrency; west end of Theodore Roosevelt Expressway
Roosevelt	Bainville	658.412	1,059.611	S-327 (Clinton Street)	
Roosevelt		659.259	1,060.975	S-405 north	
Roosevelt		666.645	1,072.861	US 2 east (Theodore Roosevelt Expressway) – Williston	Continuation into North Dakota
1.000 mi = 1.609 km; 1.000 km = 0.621 mi: Concurrency terminus

U.S. Route 2
Previous state: Idaho	Montana	Next state: North Dakota
