= Montana Highway 117 =

State highway in Montana, United States

Montana Highway 117
- MT 117 highlighted in red

Route information
- Maintained by MDT
- Length: 13.138 mi (21.144 km)

Major junctions
- South end: MT 24 in Fort Peck
- North end: US 2 at Nashua

Location
- Country: United States
- State: Montana
- Counties: Valley

Highway system
- Montana Highway System; Interstate; US; State; Secondary
← I-115	→ MT 135

Montana Highway 117 (MT 117) is a 13.138-mile-long (21.144 km) state highway in the U.S. state of Montana. Formerly Secondary Highway 249, the route allows traffic from MT 24 at Fort Peck to travel north to U.S. Route 2 (US 2) at Nashua, providing a shortcut between the two routes, as well as providing access from the north to the Fort Peck Dam and Fort Peck Lake.

== Route description ==
Highway 117 begins at the western end of the Fort Peck Dam, in a tightly angled junction with Highway 24. It proceeds eastwards, winding its way through the town of Fort Peck before turning northwards at a T-intersection on its northern outskirts. The road then proceeds past the Missouri River on its right, and heads in a generally northeasterly orientation. After crossing the Milk River, Highway 117 enters Nashua from the southwest and curves east, before taking a left turn and crossing the BNSF Railway's Northern Transcon, linking the two halves of Nashua together. Soon, the road meets U.S. Route 2 on the town's northern side and terminates.

== Major intersections ==
The entire route is in Valley County.

Location	mi	km	Destinations	Notes
Fort Peck	0.000	0.000	MT 24	Southern terminus
Nashua	13.138	21.144	US 2	Northern terminus
1.000 mi = 1.609 km; 1.000 km = 0.621 mi
