= Vida, Montana =

- Census-designated place
- Location within Montana Location within the United States
- Coordinates: 47°50′02″N 105°29′33″W
- Country: United States
- State: Montana
- County: McCone

Area
  - Total: 0.089 sq mi (0.23 km^{2})
  - Land: 0.089 sq mi (0.23 km^{2})
  - Water: 0 sq mi (0.00 km^{2})
- Elevation: 2,398 ft (731 m)

Population (2020)
  - Total: 24
  - Density: 272.3/sq mi (105.12/km^{2})
- Time zone: UTC-7 (Mountain (MST))
  - Summer (DST): UTC-6 (MDT)
- ZIP code: 59274
- FIPS code: 30-76975
- GNIS feature ID: 2806641

Vida /ˈvaɪdə/ is an unincorporated community and census-designated place (CDP) in northern McCone County, Montana, United States, located on Montana Highway 13 along the Big Sky Back Country Byway, approximately 23 miles (37 km) south of Wolf Point, and 30 miles (48 km) north of Circle. As of the 2020 census, the population of Vida was 24.

== History ==
At this location, Vida was known as "Presserville" until 1951, when the post office from a previous incarnation of Vida was moved to that town, and Presserville's citizens agreed to change the town name to conform with the name under which the post office was registered.

Over the intervening decades, the population has dwindled significantly. At the 2000 census, the Vida area had a population of approximately 70 people.

== Geography ==
=== Climate ===
According to the Köppen Climate Classification system, Vida has a semi-arid climate, abbreviated "BSk" on climate maps.

== Demographics ==
Historical population
Census	Pop.	Note	%±
2020	24		—
U.S. Decennial Census
