= Montana Highway 13 =

State highway in McCone, Roosevelt, and Daniels counties in Montana, United States

Montana Highway 13
- MT 13 highlighted in red

Route information
- Maintained by MDT
- Length: 112.507 mi (181.062 km)

Major junctions
- South end: MT 200 in Circle
- US 2 near Wolf Point
- North end: Highway 36 at the Canadian border near Scobey

Location
- Country: United States
- State: Montana
- Counties: McCone, Roosevelt, Daniels

Highway system
- Montana Highway System; Interstate; US; State; Secondary
| ← US 12 | → I-15 |

Montana Highway 13 (MT 13) is a 112-mile (180 km) state highway in the east of the U.S. state of Montana. The highway begins at its southern end at MT 200 and connects the three county seats of McCone, Roosevelt and Daniels counties. It also provides access across the northern international border into Saskatchewan, towards Moose Jaw, at the Port of Scobey.

== Route description ==
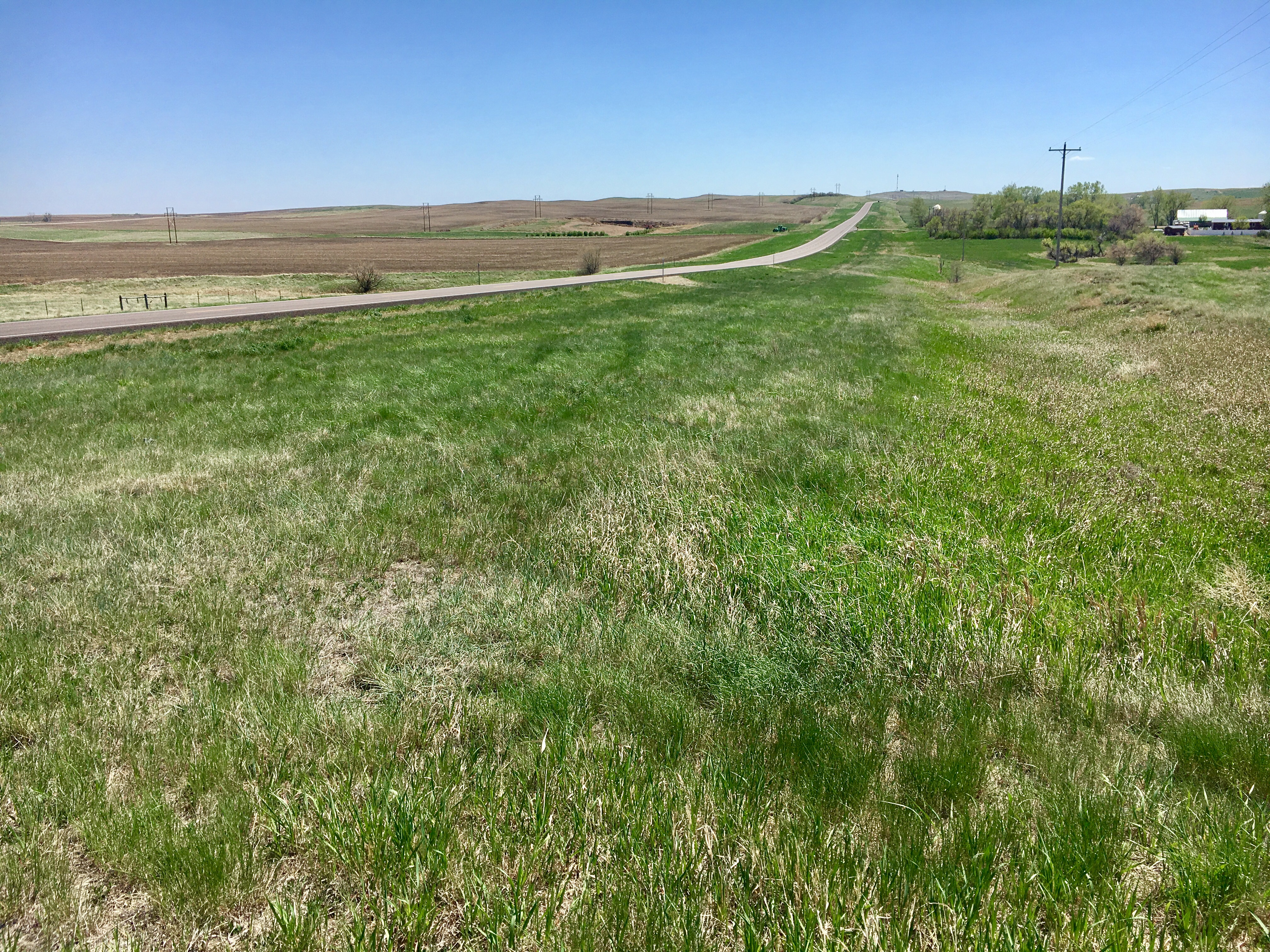
MT 13 in McCone County

MT 13 begins in the northeastern corner of Circle, where MT 200 also leaves town. From here to the Missouri River crossing south of Wolf Point, the highway is classified as part of the scenic Big Sky Back County Byway. MT 13 proceeds in a northeasterly direction for a few miles before turning onto its main northerly orientation. The road travels through the eastern portions of McCone County, servicing the small community of Vida along the way. After crossing the Missouri River, the road enters Roosevelt County as well as the Fort Peck Indian Reservation and remains within the reservation's boundaries for much of its remaining journey. Almost immediately, the route veers to the right at a Y-intersection with MT 25, which allows southerly access to and from Wolf Point, which lies to the west of MT 13. Shortly afterwards, after crossing the BNSF Railway's Northern Transcon, the highway crosses US Highway 2 (US 2), allowing northern access to Wolf Point. After another 32 miles (51 km), the highway crosses into Daniels County, leaving the Fort Peck Indian Reservation a few miles later. A short distance after crossing the Poplar River, MT 13 enters Scobey and intersects with MT 5. From here, the highway has an unimpeded run to the International Boundary at the Port of Scobey, with the pavement continuing on into Canada as Saskatchewan Highway 36.

== History ==
Up until the 1960s, MT 13 used to reach the international boundary at the Port of Whitetail, east of its current northern terminus. In addition, the highway used to extend south of its current terminus of Circle, passing through Brockway to Terry.

== Major intersections ==
| County | Location | mi | km | Destinations | Notes |
|---|---|---|---|---|---|
| McCone | Circle | 0.00 | 0.00 | MT 200 | Southern terminus; Big Sky Back Country Byway continues southwest along MT 200. |
| Roosevelt | | 46.803 | 75.322 | MT 25 | Access to Wolf Point; just north of Byway terminus at Missouri River bridge |
| Roosevelt | | 50.471 | 81.225 | US 2 | Access to Wolf Point |
| Daniels | Scobey | 97.999 | 157.714 | MT 5 | |
| Daniels | Port of Scobey | 112.507 | 181.062 | Highway 36 | Northern terminus |
1.000 mi = 1.609 km; 1.000 km = 0.621 mi

== See also ==
- List of state highways in Montana
