= Montana Highway 37 =

State highway in Montana, United States

Montana Highway 37
- Lake Koocanusa Scenic Byway
- MT 37 highlighted in red

Route information
- Maintained by MDT
- Length: 67.048 mi (107.903 km)

Major junctions
- South end: US 2 in Libby
- North end: US 93 in Eureka

Location
- Country: United States
- State: Montana
- Counties: Lincoln

Highway system
- Montana Highway System; Interstate; US; State; Secondary
| ← MT 35 | → MT 38 |

Montana State Highway 37 (MT 37) is a 67.048-mile-long (107.903 km) state highway in the US state of Montana. It begins in downtown Libby, Montana at US 2 and takes a meandering course through Kootenai National Forest, northeastwards upstream along the Kootenai River and the eastern shore of Lake Koocanusa before terminating at U.S. Route 93 at the northern end of Eureka, Montana. Previously, MT 37 also followed US 93 from Eureka into Whitefish and turned down what is now MT 40 towards US 2 and Glacier National Park until at least 1942. In 1992 the full length of the highway, plus a service road (Forest Development Road No.228), was designated as Lake Koocanusa Scenic Byway by the U.S. Forest Service.

== Route description ==
Highway 37, contained entirely within Kootenai National Forest, begins at an intersection with U.S. Route 2 in downtown Libby, Montana, and heads northeast. It crosses the BNSF Railway tracks just west of the Libby Amtrak station, and passes the site of the former vermiculite export plant before crossing the Kootenai River and taking a more easterly course.

The road follows the river upstream into a narrow, tightly winding canyon, running parallel to the railroad on the opposite bank. It suddenly turns south near the former vermiculite mine and passes by its former processing plant site. Soon, the road turns east again, then crosses the Kootenai once more and abruptly heads north, parting ways with the now southbound railroad.

The road starts to gain elevation and, once it passes the eastern abutment of Libby Dam, it follows the eastern shore of Lake Koocanusa, hugging the sides of the former canyon as it winds its way north to Rexford. The Kootenai River and Lake Koocanusa cut a narrow fjord-like gorge between the Purcell Mountains and the Salish Mountains. It bypasses Rexford to its south as the road turns east, passing over a former railroad alignment a few miles later, before turning east one last time amidst farmland to terminate at U.S. Route 93, at the northern end of Eureka.

== Major intersections ==
The entire route is in Lincoln County.

| Location | mi | km | Destinations | Notes |
|---|---|---|---|---|
| Libby | 0.000 | 0.000 | US 2 | |
| | 67.048 | 107.903 | US 93 | |
1.000 mi = 1.609 km; 1.000 km = 0.621 mi
