= Montana Highway 25 =

State highway in Montana, United States

Montana Highway 25
- MT 25 highlighted in red

Route information
- Maintained by MDT
- Length: 5.797 mi (9.329 km)

Major junctions
- West end: US 2 in Wolf Point
- East end: MT 13 in Bridge Park

Location
- Country: United States
- State: Montana
- Counties: Roosevelt

Highway system
- Montana Highway System; Interstate; US; State; Secondary
← MT 24	→ MT 28

Montana Highway 25 (MT 25) is a 5.797-mile-long (9.329 km) state highway located in the U.S. State of Montana in the east part of the state.

== Route description ==
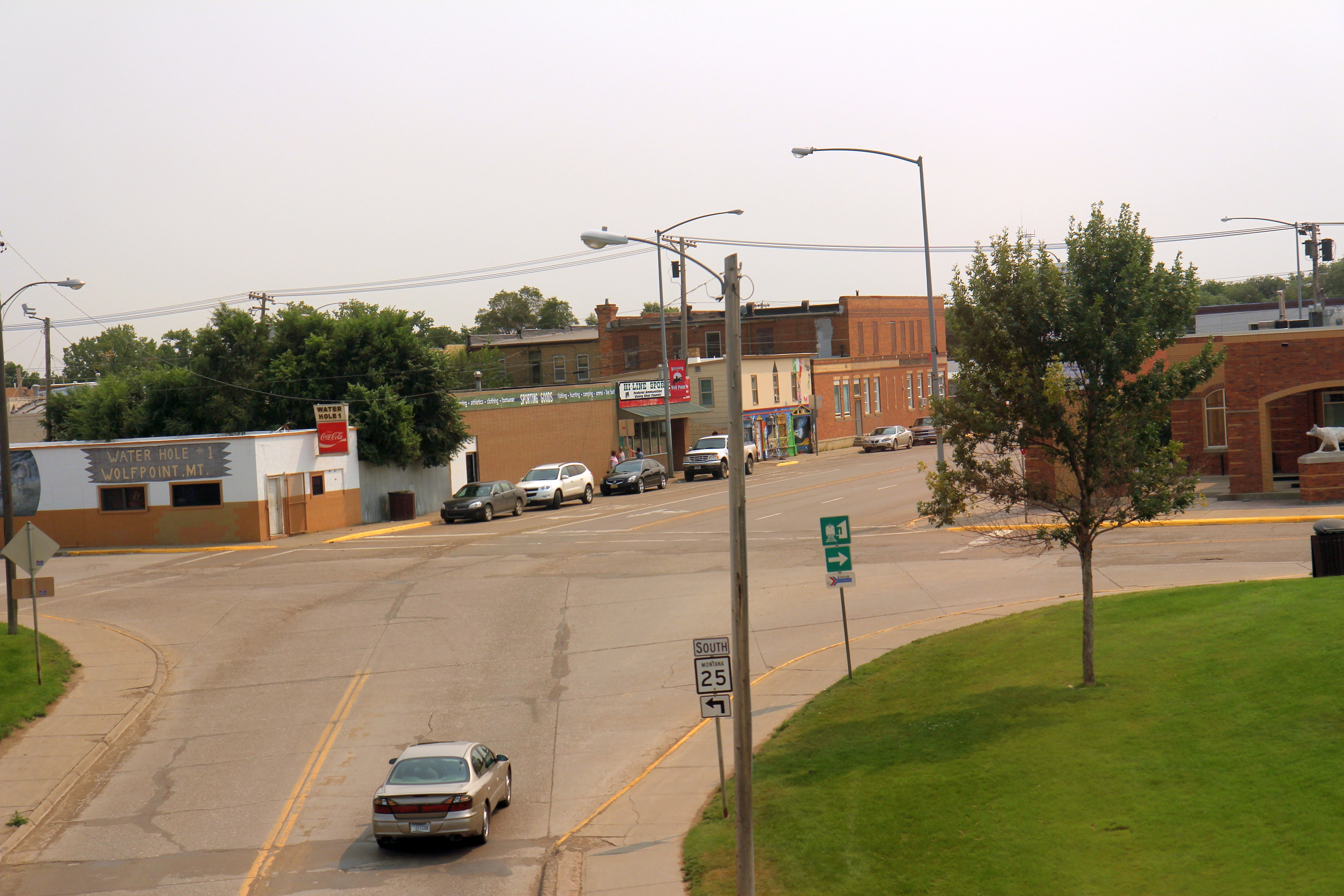
Highway 25 in Wolf Point

Highway 25's western terminus is at U.S. Route 2 in Wolf Point, Montana. The route heads northeast parallel to US 2 and a railroad. After bending southeastward, it passes the Lyman Clayton Airport and the Airport Golf Club, ending at Montana Highway 13, just to the north of the Missouri River.

== History ==
During the 1930s, an old alignment of Highway 25 existed from Lewistown to Billings.

== Major intersections ==
The entire route is in Roosevelt County.

Location	mi	km	Destinations	Notes
Wolf Point	0.000	0.000	US 2	Western Terminus of MT 25
Bridge Park	5.797	9.329	MT 13	Eastern Terminus of MT 25
1.000 mi = 1.609 km; 1.000 km = 0.621 mi
