= Montana Highway 42 =

State highway in Montana, United States

Montana Highway 42
- MT 42 highlighted in red

Route information
- Maintained by MDT
- Length: 2.892 mi (4.654 km)

Major junctions
- South end: MT 24
- North end: US 2 in Glasgow

Location
- Country: United States
- State: Montana
- Counties: Valley

Highway system
- Montana Highway System; Interstate; US; State; Secondary
← MT 41	→ MT 43

Montana Highway 42 (MT 42) is a short, 2.892-mile-long (4.654 km) state highway in the U.S. state of Montana, connecting MT 24 with downtown Glasgow. Formerly Highway 24W, Highway 42 (its route number a reversal of "24") runs northwest from where Highway 24 crosses the BNSF Railway's Northern Transcon, staying parallel to the tracks until it turns right in Glasgow's downtown and dives under the railroad to meet with and terminates at U.S. Route 2 (US 2).

== Route description ==
MT 42 begins at a T-intersection with MT 24 southwest of Glasgow. MT 24 makes up the northern and southeastern leg of the intersection, while MT 42 heads to the northwest. For most of its length, the route is situated between the Milk River and the Northern Transcon. MT 42 and the railroad enter Glasgow from the southeast and both curve to the north-northwest; in town, the highway follows First Avenue South. Near the city's Amtrak station, MT 42 turns to the north onto Sixth Street and crosses beneath the railroad tracks. Shortly thereafter, it ends at its intersection with US 2.

== History ==
The highway was renumbered from 24W to 42 in 1994.

== Major intersections ==
The entire route is in Valley County.

Location	mi	km	Destinations	Notes
	0.000	0.000	MT 24	Southern terminus
Glasgow	2.892	4.654	US 2	Northern terminus
1.000 mi = 1.609 km; 1.000 km = 0.621 mi
