= Montana Highway 40 =

State highway in Montana, United States

Montana Highway 40
- MT 40 highlighted in red

Route information
- Maintained by MDT
- Length: 4.505 mi (7.250 km)
- Existed: 1930s–present

Major junctions
- West end: US 93 just south of Whitefish
- East end: US 2 west of Columbia Falls

Location
- Country: United States
- State: Montana
- Counties: Flathead

Highway system
- Montana Highway System; Interstate; US; State; Secondary
← MT 39	→ MT 41

Montana Highway 40 (MT 40) is a 4.505-mile-long (7.250 km) state highway in Flathead County, Montana. It connects U.S. Route 93 (US 93) south of Whitefish to US 2 west of Columbia Falls.

== Route description ==
MT 40 begins at US 93 on the southern outskirts of Whitefish and proceeds eastward in a roughly straight line to its terminus with US 2 west of Columbia Falls.

MT 40 forms the central part of the most direct link between the two cities, allowing travel from the Hi-Line communities and Glacier National Park to the communities of the Columbia Valley in British Columbia without needing to detour south via Kalispell or north via the Crowsnest Pass between British Columbia and Alberta.

== History ==
The basic route of MT 40 has been in place since the 1930s, and is seen on the 1935 state map. For a brief time in the 1940s, it was even signed as MT 37, overlaid on US 93 to north of Eureka and then going to Libby, as seen on the 1942 map.

The MT 40 designation is clearly visible on the 1949 state map. MT 40 extended through Columbia Falls to the current US 2/Secondary Highway 206 junction until the US 2 and S-206 routings were swapped in 1983.

This highway was originally part of Montana 37 until around 1942. That previous incarnation of 37 ran from Libby through Eureka and down into Whitefish.

== Major intersections ==
The entire highway is in Flathead County.

Location	mi	km	Destinations	Notes
Whitefish	0.000	0.000	US 93 – Kalispell, Whitefish	Western terminus
	1.055	1.698	S-292 (Whitefish Stage Road)	
	4.505	7.250	US 2 – Columbia Falls, West Glacier, Kalispell, Airport	Eastern terminus
1.000 mi = 1.609 km; 1.000 km = 0.621 mi
