= Montana Highway 49 =

State highway in Montana, United States

Montana Highway 49
- Looking Glass Hill Road
- MT 49 highlighted in red

Route information
- Maintained by MDT
- Length: 11.734 mi (18.884 km)

Major junctions
- South end: US 2 at East Glacier Park
- North end: US 89 at Kiowa

Location
- Country: United States
- State: Montana
- Counties: Glacier

Highway system
- Montana Highway System; Interstate; US; State; Secondary
← MT 48	→ MT 55

Highway 49 (MT 49) in the U.S. State of Montana is a route running in a northerly direction from a junction with U.S. Route 2 in the town of East Glacier Park. The highway extends approximately 12 miles (19 km) to an intersection with U.S. Route 89 at a location known as Kiowa. Highway 49 is near the southeastern corner of Glacier National Park, and is heavily used by tourists during the summer months. A spur road heading west from Montana 49 four miles (6 km) north of East Glacier provides access to the Two Medicine area of the park.

Much of the route is steep, narrow, and winding, and prone to landslides. The northerly eight miles (13 km) of the route, passing over Looking Glass Hill, is unmaintained and usually impassable during the winter months.

Highway 49 was once part of the alignment of U.S. 2, prior to the construction of a highway bridge across Two Medicine Creek, which allowed for a more direct route between East Glacier and Browning.

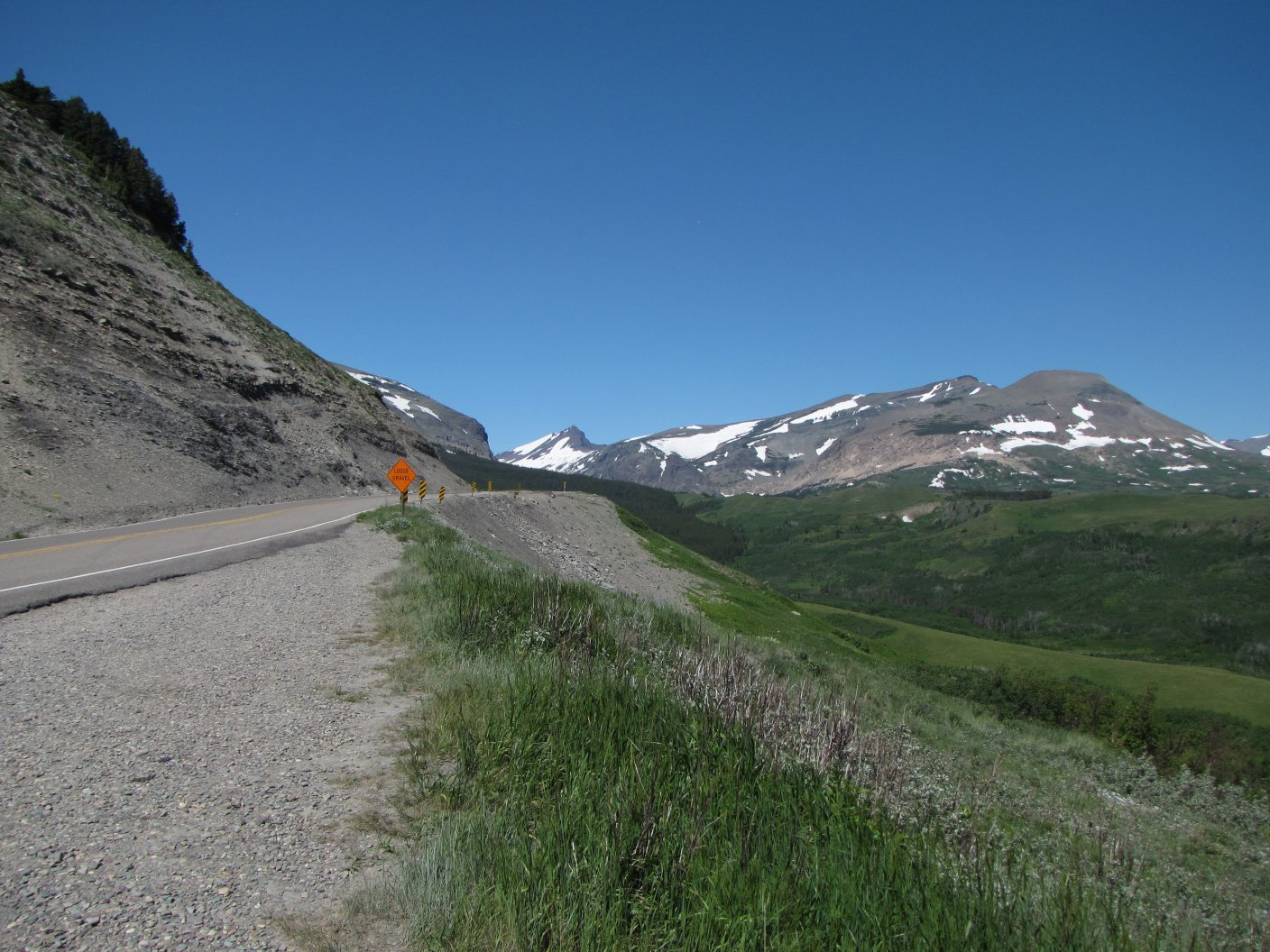
Looking Glass Hill Road

== Major intersections ==
The entire route is in Glacier County.

Location	mi	km	Destinations	Notes
East Glacier Park Village	0.000	0.000	US 2 – Browning, Kalispell	
Kiowa	11.734	18.884	US 89 – Browning, St. Mary	
1.000 mi = 1.609 km; 1.000 km = 0.621 mi

== Images ==
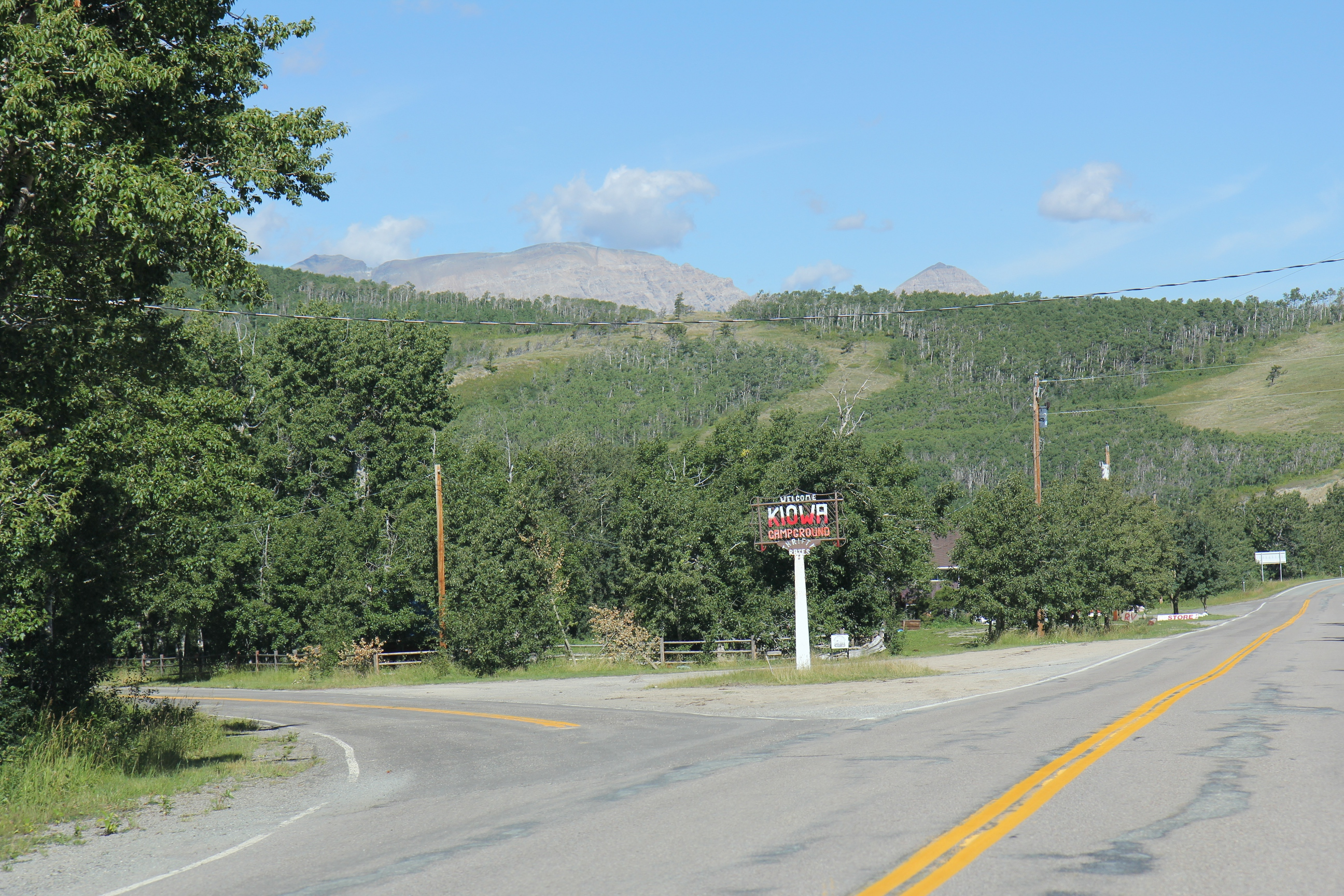
Northern terminus in Kiowa

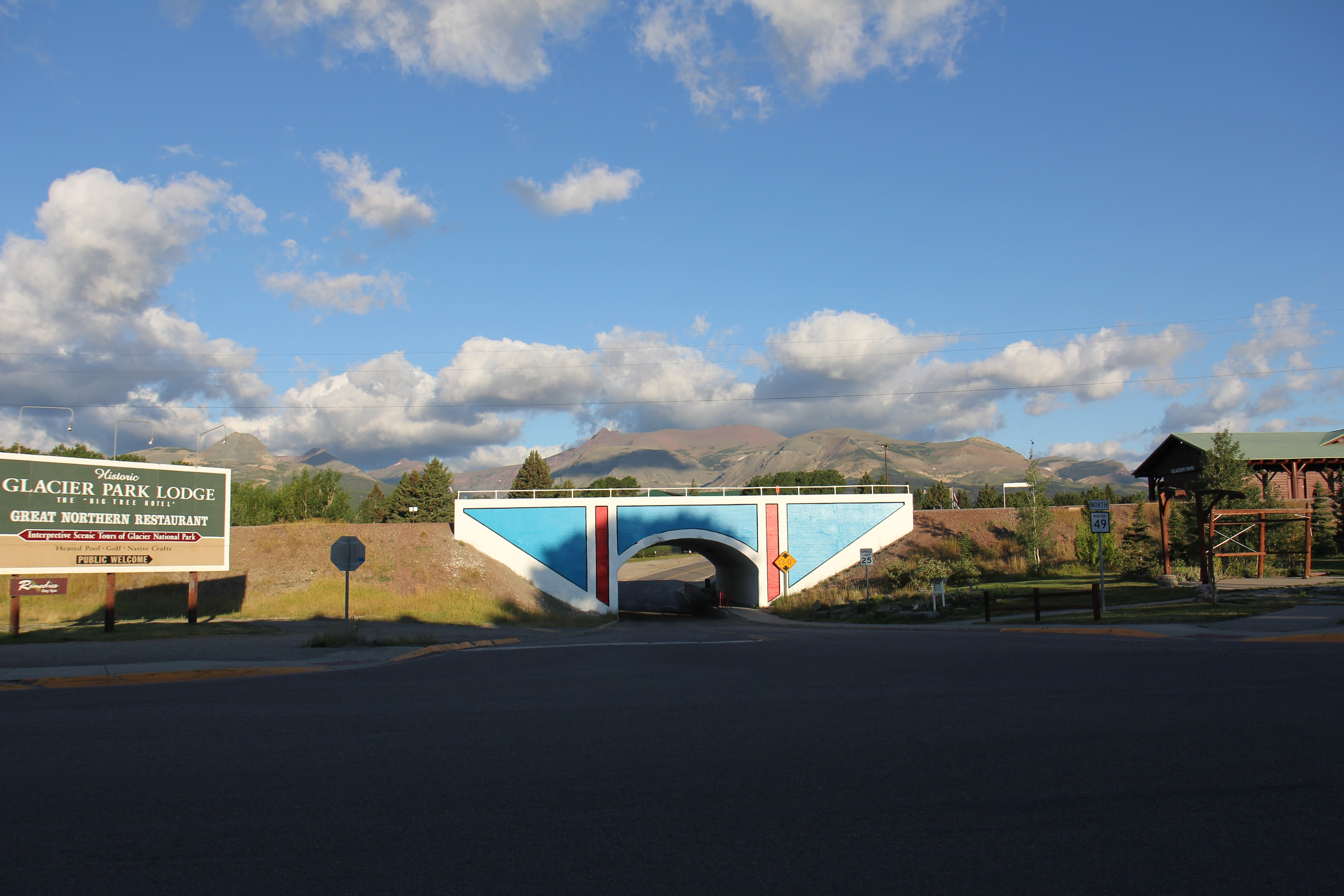
Southern terminus at East Glacier Village

View from MT 49. Rising Wolf Mountain on the left. Lower Two Medicine Lake in the bottom.
