= Redwater River =

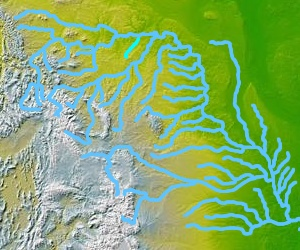
- The Redwater River

Location
- Country: McCone, Dawson, Prairie, and Richland County, Montana

Physical characteristics
- Source
  - coordinates: 47°03′37″N 105°52′53″W
- Mouth
  - coordinates: 48°03′41″N 105°12′38″W
  - elevation: 1,946 feet (593 m)
- Discharge
  - location: Belle Fourche
  - average: 153 cu ft/s (4.3 m^{3}/s)

Basin features
- River system: Missouri River

The Redwater River is a tributary of the Missouri River, approximately 110 mi (177 km), in eastern Montana in the United States.

It rises in on the northern slope of the Big Sheep Mountains, in northwestern Prairie County, and flows northeast across the plains past Brockway and Circle and joins the Missouri in northeastern McCone County, approximately 4 mi (6 km) south of Poplar.

== Variant names ==
The Redwater River has also been known as: Red Water Creek, Red Water River, Redwater Creek, Two Thousand Mile Creek, Two-Thousand-Mile Creek

== See also ==
- List of rivers of Montana
- Montana Stream Access Law
