= Opheim–West Poplar River Border Crossing =

Border crossing between Canada and the United States

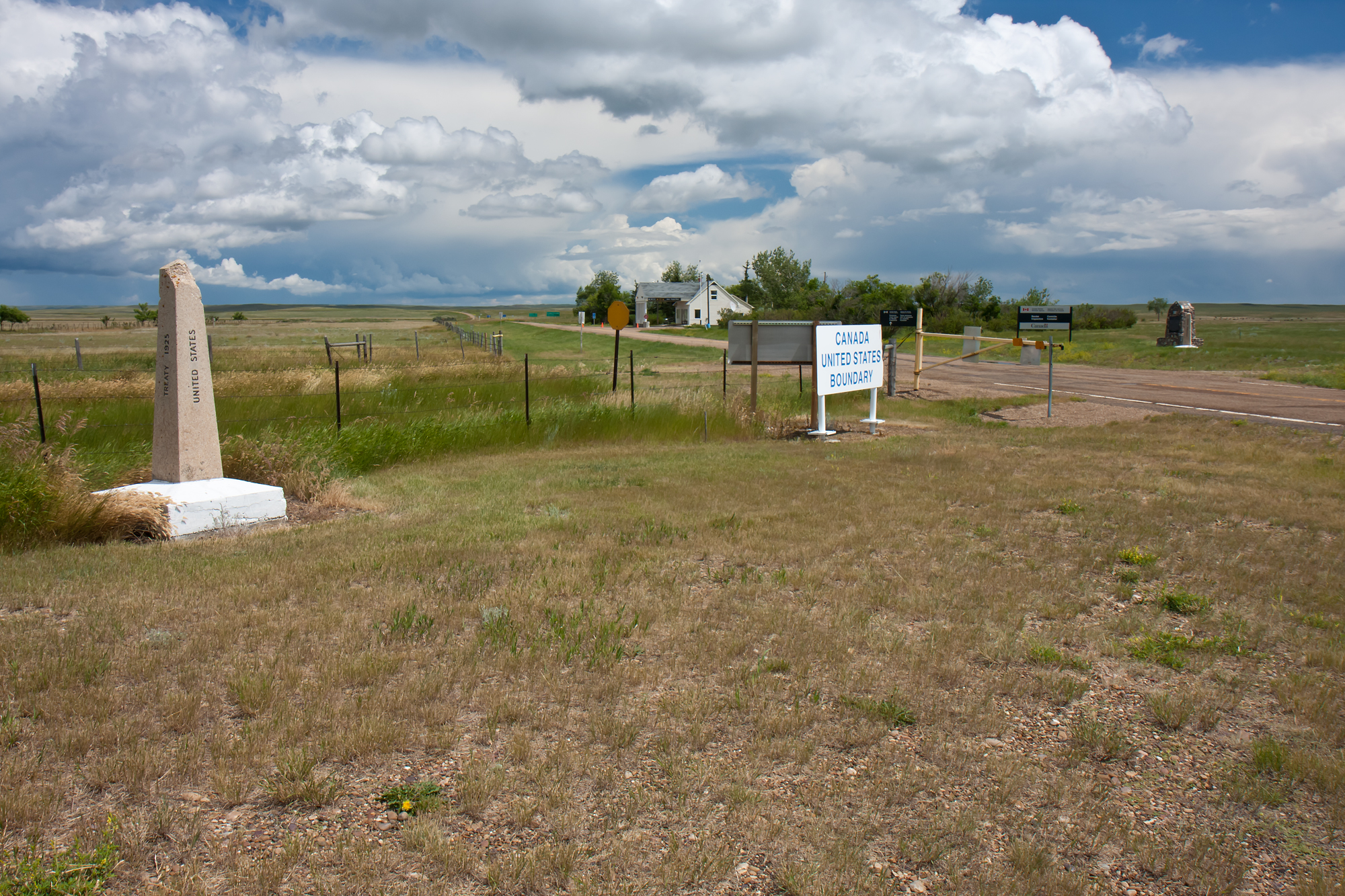

Location
- Country: United States; Canada
- Location: MT 24 / Highway 2; US Port: 6071 State Highway 24 North, Opheim, MT 59250-0376; Canadian Port: Highway 2, Rockglen, Saskatchewan S0H 3R0
- Coordinates: 48.999528°N 106.377939°W

Details
- Opened: 1917

Website
- https://www.cbp.gov/contact/ports/opheim-mt

The Opheim–West Poplar River Border Crossing connects the town of Opheim, Montana with Rockglen, Saskatchewan on the Canada–United States border. It is reached by Montana Highway 24 on the American side and Saskatchewan Highway 2 on the Canadian side.

The crossing is among the 10 least-used on the border. It is so remote that border officials live in housing next to each country's stations. In 2004, the US replaced its small border station with a large facility. Canada replaced its border station at West Poplar River in 2015.

== Climate ==
Climate data for Opheim 10 N, Montana, 1991–2020 normals, 1959-2020 extremes: 2878ft (877m)
| Month | Jan | Feb | Mar | Apr | May | Jun | Jul | Aug | Sep | Oct | Nov | Dec | Year |
|---|---|---|---|---|---|---|---|---|---|---|---|---|---|
| Record high °F (°C) | 56 (13) | 64 (18) | 73 (23) | 91 (33) | 98 (37) | 105 (41) | 103 (39) | 104 (40) | 98 (37) | 89 (32) | 76 (24) | 55 (13) | 105 (41) |
| Mean maximum °F (°C) | 44.0 (6.7) | 44.7 (7.1) | 57.9 (14.4) | 73.1 (22.8) | 82.5 (28.1) | 87.7 (30.9) | 92.9 (33.8) | 94.1 (34.5) | 87.0 (30.6) | 75.1 (23.9) | 58.5 (14.7) | 45.0 (7.2) | 94.7 (34.8) |
| Mean daily maximum °F (°C) | 21.6 (−5.8) | 25.7 (−3.5) | 38.1 (3.4) | 53.8 (12.1) | 65.4 (18.6) | 73.1 (22.8) | 81.1 (27.3) | 81.3 (27.4) | 70.4 (21.3) | 54.3 (12.4) | 37.1 (2.8) | 24.8 (−4.0) | 52.2 (11.2) |
| Daily mean °F (°C) | 11.2 (−11.6) | 14.8 (−9.6) | 26.5 (−3.1) | 40.0 (4.4) | 50.8 (10.4) | 59.4 (15.2) | 65.7 (18.7) | 64.9 (18.3) | 54.6 (12.6) | 41.1 (5.1) | 26.2 (−3.2) | 14.4 (−9.8) | 39.1 (4.0) |
| Mean daily minimum °F (°C) | 0.8 (−17.3) | 3.9 (−15.6) | 14.9 (−9.5) | 26.2 (−3.2) | 36.1 (2.3) | 45.7 (7.6) | 50.3 (10.2) | 48.6 (9.2) | 38.8 (3.8) | 27.8 (−2.3) | 15.3 (−9.3) | 4.1 (−15.5) | 26.0 (−3.3) |
| Mean minimum °F (°C) | −28.2 (−33.4) | −24.0 (−31.1) | −13.6 (−25.3) | 9.6 (−12.4) | 20.4 (−6.4) | 33.0 (0.6) | 38.4 (3.6) | 33.9 (1.1) | 22.4 (−5.3) | 8.8 (−12.9) | −9.3 (−22.9) | −22.9 (−30.5) | −35.3 (−37.4) |
| Record low °F (°C) | −50 (−46) | −51 (−46) | −37 (−38) | −18 (−28) | 8 (−13) | 20 (−7) | 29 (−2) | 25 (−4) | 2 (−17) | −19 (−28) | −32 (−36) | −49 (−45) | −51 (−46) |
| Average precipitation inches (mm) | 0.27 (6.9) | 0.37 (9.4) | 0.43 (11) | 0.91 (23) | 2.09 (53) | 3.70 (94) | 2.25 (57) | 1.57 (40) | 1.39 (35) | 0.82 (21) | 0.36 (9.1) | 0.27 (6.9) | 14.43 (366.3) |
| Average snowfall inches (cm) | 4.50 (11.4) | 6.20 (15.7) | 5.10 (13.0) | 2.50 (6.4) | 0.90 (2.3) | 0.00 (0.00) | 0.00 (0.00) | 0.00 (0.00) | 0.20 (0.51) | 1.20 (3.0) | 5.30 (13.5) | 7.10 (18.0) | 33 (83.81) |
Source 1: NOAA
Source 2: XMACIS (temp records & monthly max/mins)

== See also ==
- List of Canada–United States border crossings
