= Brockway, Montana =

- Census-designated place
- Location within Montana Location within the United States
- Coordinates: 47°17′57″N 105°45′52″W
- Country: United States
- State: Montana
- County: McCone

Area
  - Total: 0.35 sq mi (0.91 km^{2})
  - Land: 0.35 sq mi (0.91 km^{2})
  - Water: 0 sq mi (0.00 km^{2})
- Elevation: 2,579 ft (786 m)

Population (2020)
  - Total: 14
  - Density: 39.8/sq mi (15.36/km^{2})
- Time zone: UTC-7 (Mountain (MST))
  - Summer (DST): UTC-6 (MDT)
- ZIP code: 59214
- FIPS code: 30-10075
- GNIS feature ID: 2806638

Brockway is an unincorporated community and census-designated place (CDP) in southern McCone County, Montana, United States, located near the Redwater River. As of the 2020 census, the first year it was listed as a CDP, the population was 14.

Brockway is home to the annual Brockway Dairy Day Rodeo.

== History ==
Brockway is named for three homesteader brothers. The post office was opened in 1913. The Northern Pacific Railway's Redwater branch line reached the town in 1928.

The town "became a major livestock shipping point reaching number one in the U.S. in 1934," according to historical marker author Bob Fletcher.

== Geography ==
Brockway is located along Montana Secondary Highway 253, 1 mile (1.6 km) south of Montana Highway 200, along the Big Sky Back Country Byway. It is 12 miles (19 km) southwest of Circle, the McCone county seat.

According to the U.S. Census Bureau, the Brockway CDP has an area of 0.35 square miles (0.91 km^{2}), all land. The Redwater River, a northeast-flowing tributary of the Missouri, passes just west and north of the community.

=== Climate ===
According to the Köppen Climate Classification system, Brockway has a semi-arid climate, abbreviated "BSk" on climate maps.

Climate data for Brockway, Montana (1991–2020 normals, extremes 1959–present)
Month	Jan	Feb	Mar	Apr	May	Jun	Jul	Aug	Sep	Oct	Nov	Dec	Year
Record high °F (°C)	68 (20)	71 (22)	84 (29)	91 (33)	101 (38)	110 (43)	108 (42)	108 (42)	104 (40)	94 (34)	78 (26)	68 (20)	110 (43)
Mean maximum °F (°C)	50.6 (10.3)	53.0 (11.7)	68.0 (20.0)	78.8 (26.0)	85.8 (29.9)	93.7 (34.3)	99.1 (37.3)	99.7 (37.6)	94.8 (34.9)	81.5 (27.5)	67.2 (19.6)	52.7 (11.5)	101.8 (38.8)
Mean daily maximum °F (°C)	28.8 (−1.8)	32.5 (0.3)	44.5 (6.9)	56.6 (13.7)	66.7 (19.3)	76.2 (24.6)	85.2 (29.6)	84.8 (29.3)	73.3 (22.9)	57.4 (14.1)	42.6 (5.9)	31.4 (−0.3)	56.7 (13.7)
Daily mean °F (°C)	18.0 (−7.8)	21.5 (−5.8)	32.6 (0.3)	43.6 (6.4)	53.5 (11.9)	63.2 (17.3)	70.5 (21.4)	69.5 (20.8)	58.7 (14.8)	44.7 (7.1)	31.1 (−0.5)	20.8 (−6.2)	44.0 (6.7)
Mean daily minimum °F (°C)	7.2 (−13.8)	10.5 (−11.9)	20.7 (−6.3)	30.7 (−0.7)	40.4 (4.7)	50.1 (10.1)	55.8 (13.2)	54.3 (12.4)	44.0 (6.7)	31.9 (−0.1)	19.5 (−6.9)	10.2 (−12.1)	31.3 (−0.4)
Mean minimum °F (°C)	−23.0 (−30.6)	−16.8 (−27.1)	−5.2 (−20.7)	13.7 (−10.2)	24.9 (−3.9)	37.1 (2.8)	44.4 (6.9)	38.8 (3.8)	27.2 (−2.7)	12.2 (−11.0)	−5.0 (−20.6)	−18.6 (−28.1)	−30.9 (−34.9)
Record low °F (°C)	−44 (−42)	−47 (−44)	−36 (−38)	−9 (−23)	12 (−11)	24 (−4)	33 (1)	25 (−4)	14 (−10)	−10 (−23)	−35 (−37)	−43 (−42)	−47 (−44)
Average precipitation inches (mm)	0.24 (6.1)	0.18 (4.6)	0.29 (7.4)	1.16 (29)	2.48 (63)	2.54 (65)	2.07 (53)	1.14 (29)	1.08 (27)	0.86 (22)	0.21 (5.3)	0.20 (5.1)	12.45 (316)
Average precipitation days (≥ 0.01 in)	2.4	2.2	2.6	4.7	7.2	7.8	5.7	3.6	3.6	3.0	1.7	1.5	46.0
Source: NOAA

== Demographics ==
Historical population
Census	Pop.	Note	%±
2020	14		—
U.S. Decennial Census
