= Kiowa, Montana =

Unincorporated community in Montana, U.S.

Kiowa
- Unincorporated community
- Location within Montana Location within the United States
- Coordinates: 48°32′51.89″N 113°16′15.35″W
- Country: United States
- State: Montana
- County: Glacier
- Elevation: 5,075 ft (1,547 m)
- Time zone: UTC-7 (MST)
  - Summer (DST): UTC-6 (MDT)
- GNIS feature ID: 773074

Kiowa, is an unincorporated community in Glacier County, Montana, United States. Its elevation is 5,076 feet (1,547 m) and is located at the intersection of U.S. Route 89 and Highway 49, 12 miles (19 km) west of Browning, near Glacier National Park.

== Climate ==
This climatic region is typified by large seasonal temperature differences, with warm to hot (and often humid) summers and cold (sometimes severely cold) winters. According to the Köppen Climate Classification system, Kiowa has a humid continental climate, abbreviated "Dfb" on climate maps.

Climate data for Kiowa, Montana: 4,929 ft (1,502 m)
Month	Jan	Feb	Mar	Apr	May	Jun	Jul	Aug	Sep	Oct	Nov	Dec	Year
Record high °F (°C)	56 (13)	63 (17)	70 (21)	80 (27)	86 (30)	89 (32)	97 (36)	93 (34)	92 (33)	86 (30)	67 (19)	53 (12)	97 (36)
Mean daily maximum °F (°C)	31.9 (−0.1)	33.9 (1.1)	39.7 (4.3)	47.5 (8.6)	58.1 (14.5)	66.6 (19.2)	74.3 (23.5)	74.2 (23.4)	63.1 (17.3)	52.0 (11.1)	37.0 (2.8)	30.2 (−1.0)	50.7 (10.4)
Daily mean °F (°C)	22.6 (−5.2)	24.1 (−4.4)	29.2 (−1.6)	37.2 (2.9)	46.3 (7.9)	53.6 (12.0)	59.7 (15.4)	59.0 (15.0)	49.8 (9.9)	41.0 (5.0)	28.7 (−1.8)	21.5 (−5.8)	39.4 (4.1)
Mean daily minimum °F (°C)	13.2 (−10.4)	14.3 (−9.8)	18.7 (−7.4)	26.9 (−2.8)	34.5 (1.4)	40.9 (4.9)	45.1 (7.3)	43.9 (6.6)	36.5 (2.5)	30.0 (−1.1)	20.3 (−6.5)	12.9 (−10.6)	28.1 (−2.2)
Record low °F (°C)	−35 (−37)	−44 (−42)	−33 (−36)	−7 (−22)	16 (−9)	25 (−4)	30 (−1)	18 (−8)	8 (−13)	−12 (−24)	−26 (−32)	−42 (−41)	−44 (−42)
Average precipitation inches (mm)	3.2 (81)	2.5 (64)	2.3 (58)	2.1 (53)	2.6 (66)	3.0 (76)	1.5 (38)	1.6 (41)	1.8 (46)	1.7 (43)	3.0 (76)	2.9 (74)	28.2 (720)
Average snowfall inches (cm)	33.5 (85)	27.4 (70)	24.3 (62)	17.8 (45)	4.3 (11)	0.7 (1.8)	0.0 (0.0)	0.2 (0.51)	2.6 (6.6)	8.3 (21)	22.7 (58)	30.4 (77)	172.2 (437)
