= Wolf Point, Montana =

City in Montana, United States

Wolf Point, Montana Šųktʿókeja Oʾípʿa (Assiniboine)
- City
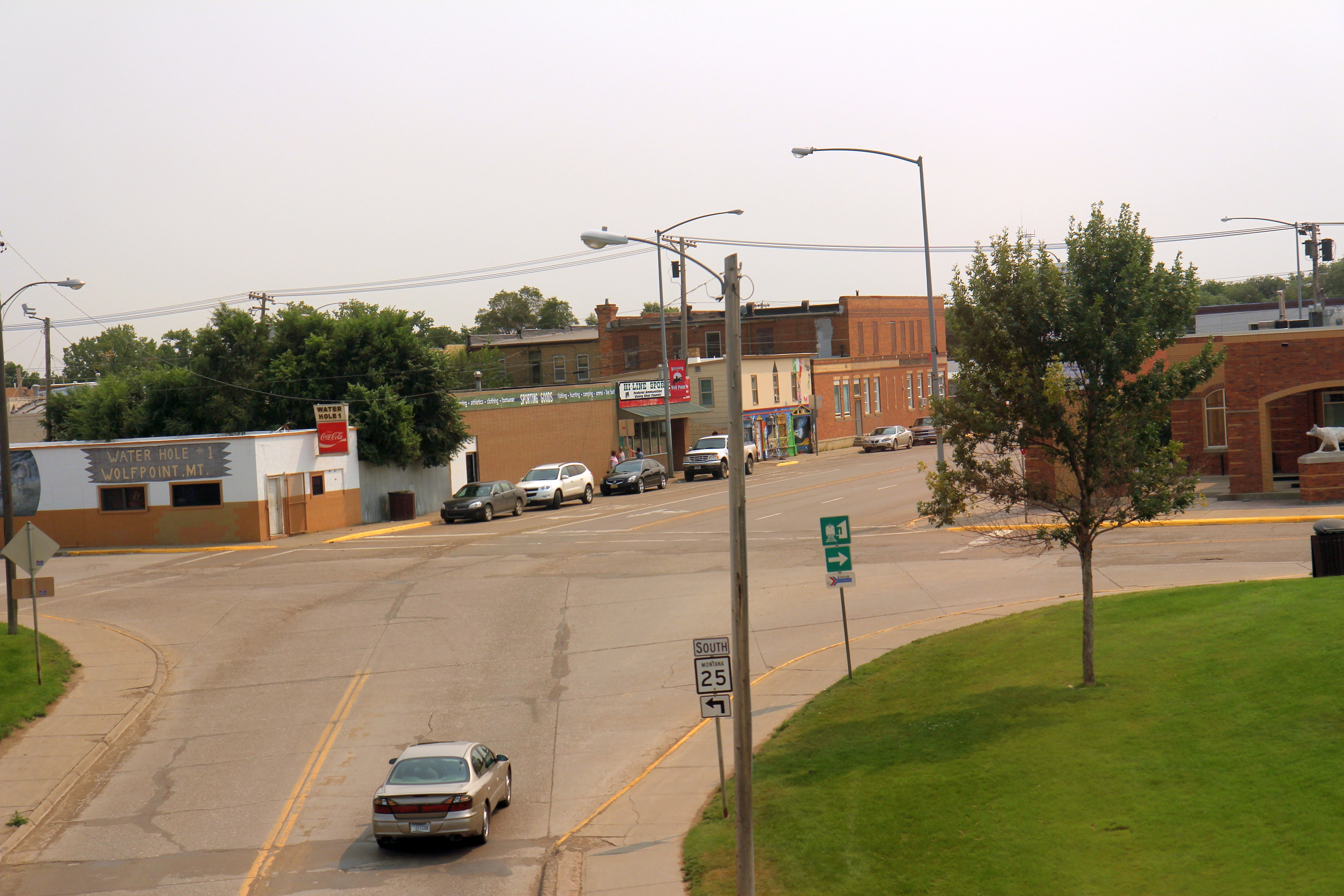
- Downtown Wolf Point

- Location of Wolf Point, Montana
- Coordinates: 48°05′35″N 105°38′29″W
- Country: United States
- State: Montana
- County: Roosevelt
- Incorporated (city): 1915

Government
  - Type: Tribal

Area
  - Total: 0.88 sq mi (2.29 km^{2})
  - Land: 0.88 sq mi (2.29 km^{2})
  - Water: 0 sq mi (0.00 km^{2})
- Elevation: 2,001 ft (610 m)

Population (2020)
  - Total: 2,517
  - Density: 2,851.4/sq mi (1,100.95/km^{2})
- Time zone: UTC−7 (Mountain Standard Time (MST))
  - Summer (DST): UTC−6 (Mountain Daylight Time (MDT))
- ZIP code: 59201
- Area code: 406
- FIPS code: 30-81475
- GNIS feature ID: 2412291
- Website: http://ci.wolf-point.mt.us/

Wolf Point (Assiniboine: Šųktʿókeja Oʾípʿa) is a city in and the county seat of Roosevelt County, Montana, United States. The population was 2,517 at the 2020 census, down 4% from 2,621 in the 2010 Census. It is the largest community on the Fort Peck Indian Reservation. Wolf Point is the home of the annual Wild Horse Stampede, and the Wadopana pow-wow, the oldest traditional pow-wow in Montana.

== History ==
Wolf Point began as a trading post in the 1860s at the confluence of Wolf Creek and the Missouri River. Farming began in the area as early as 1874, with the Civil War pioneer Philip "Sandy" Knorr and John Winn being the first people to plant the first harvest in Northeastern Montana. Philip Knorr, John Winn, James 'Montana Jim' Helmer, Hank Cusker, Henry Kirn, Jacob Wirth, and James MacDonald were the first pioneers in Wolf Point. The Great Northern Railway arrived in 1887. Wolf Point incorporated in 1915 and became the county seat in 1919.

== Geography ==
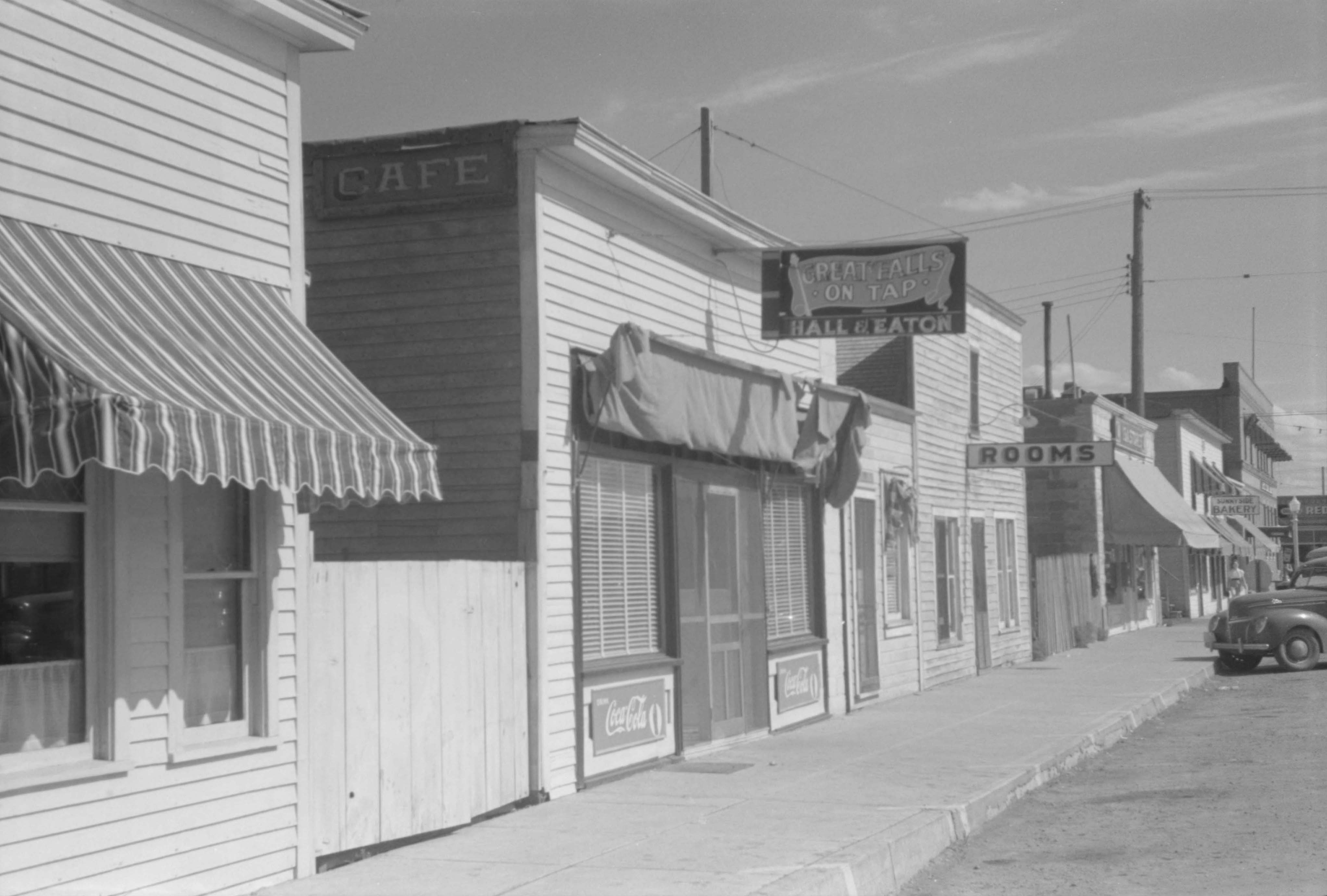
Street in Wolf Point, 1941. Photo by Marion Post Wolcott.

=== Topography ===
Wolf Point is located in north-eastern Montana in the wide, shallow valley of the Missouri River, just below its confluence with Wolf Creek. Wolf Point is situated on the High Plains of eastern Montana. According to the United States Census Bureau, the city has a total area of 0.88 square miles (2.28 km^{2}), all land.

The city is located on the north bank of the Missouri River, the southern part occupying the ancestral floodplain of that river. The northern part occupies south facing, low-lying hills overlooking a terrace. The central business district is located in the described southern portion.

=== Climate ===
Wolf Point experiences a semi-arid steppe climate (BSkw), with generally cold, dry winters and hot summers. Late spring and early summer are, on average, the wettest periods of the year. During the summer warm, humid air masses more typical of a warm summer continental climate (Dfb) may move into the area from the south or east. Summertime thunderstorms commonly occur, and sometimes are severe, featuring hail and, infrequently, funnel clouds or tornados.

Cold waves may cover the area 6 to 12 times per winter, with temperatures well below 0 °F (−17.8 °C). Between cold waves, there are sometimes 10-day or longer periods of mild, but often windy weather, caused by chinook winds. These winds cause temperatures to rise rapidly, often giving relief in the form of mild temperatures in the coldest months of the year.

Climate data for Wolf Point, Montana (1991–2020 normals, extremes 1941–present)
Month	Jan	Feb	Mar	Apr	May	Jun	Jul	Aug	Sep	Oct	Nov	Dec	Year
Record high °F (°C)	60 (16)	71 (22)	80 (27)	95 (35)	102 (39)	112 (44)	109 (43)	110 (43)	107 (42)	93 (34)	75 (24)	65 (18)	112 (44)
Mean maximum °F (°C)	45.1 (7.3)	48.1 (8.9)	66.4 (19.1)	79.1 (26.2)	87.3 (30.7)	93.5 (34.2)	98.1 (36.7)	98.9 (37.2)	92.9 (33.8)	81.4 (27.4)	64.3 (17.9)	48.1 (8.9)	100.8 (38.2)
Mean daily maximum °F (°C)	25.4 (−3.7)	31.1 (−0.5)	44.9 (7.2)	59.6 (15.3)	69.7 (20.9)	77.9 (25.5)	86.9 (30.5)	86.4 (30.2)	75.5 (24.2)	59.7 (15.4)	42.7 (5.9)	29.1 (−1.6)	57.4 (14.1)
Daily mean °F (°C)	15.7 (−9.1)	20.7 (−6.3)	33.5 (0.8)	46.4 (8.0)	56.8 (13.8)	65.6 (18.7)	73.0 (22.8)	72.0 (22.2)	61.1 (16.2)	47.1 (8.4)	32.2 (0.1)	19.6 (−6.9)	45.3 (7.4)
Mean daily minimum °F (°C)	6.1 (−14.4)	10.3 (−12.1)	22.0 (−5.6)	33.2 (0.7)	43.9 (6.6)	53.3 (11.8)	59.1 (15.1)	57.6 (14.2)	46.7 (8.2)	34.5 (1.4)	21.6 (−5.8)	10.1 (−12.2)	33.2 (0.7)
Mean minimum °F (°C)	−21.9 (−29.9)	−14.6 (−25.9)	−4.8 (−20.4)	14.7 (−9.6)	27.4 (−2.6)	40.7 (4.8)	47.9 (8.8)	43.3 (6.3)	28.8 (−1.8)	13.1 (−10.5)	−0.8 (−18.2)	−13.5 (−25.3)	−28.5 (−33.6)
Record low °F (°C)	−57 (−49)	−47 (−44)	−42 (−41)	−10 (−23)	6 (−14)	26 (−3)	32 (0)	30 (−1)	8 (−13)	−10 (−23)	−26 (−32)	−44 (−42)	−57 (−49)
Average precipitation inches (mm)	0.41 (10)	0.27 (6.9)	0.46 (12)	0.91 (23)	2.10 (53)	3.54 (90)	1.81 (46)	1.81 (46)	1.40 (36)	0.85 (22)	0.42 (11)	0.35 (8.9)	14.33 (364)
Average precipitation days (≥ 0.01 in)	2.8	2.0	2.5	3.0	5.6	8.8	6.0	4.8	3.9	3.6	2.7	2.5	48.2
Source: NOAA

== Demographics ==
Historical population
Census	Pop.	Note	%±
1920	2,098		—
1930	1,539		−26.6%
1940	1,960		27.4%
1950	2,557		30.5%
1960	3,585		40.2%
1970	3,095		−13.7%
1980	3,074		−0.7%
1990	2,880		−6.3%
2000	2,663		−7.5%
2010	2,621		−1.6%
2020	2,517		−4.0%
U.S. Decennial Census

=== 2020 census ===
As of the 2020 census, Wolf Point had a population of 2,517. The median age was 35.8 years. 25.8% of residents were under the age of 18 and 17.1% of residents were 65 years of age or older. For every 100 females there were 97.4 males, and for every 100 females age 18 and over there were 92.9 males age 18 and over.

0.0% of residents lived in urban areas, while 100.0% lived in rural areas.

There were 916 households in Wolf Point, of which 36.4% had children under the age of 18 living in them. Of all households, 34.4% were married-couple households, 22.9% were households with a male householder and no spouse or partner present, and 32.5% were households with a female householder and no spouse or partner present. About 29.1% of all households were made up of individuals and 9.7% had someone living alone who was 65 years of age or older.

There were 1,009 housing units, of which 9.2% were vacant. The homeowner vacancy rate was 1.8% and the rental vacancy rate was 6.1%.

Racial composition as of the 2020 census
Race	Number	Percent
White	912	36.2%
Black or African American	13	0.5%
American Indian and Alaska Native	1,279	50.8%
Asian	27	1.1%
Native Hawaiian and Other Pacific Islander	0	0.0%
Some other race	9	0.4%
Two or more races	277	11.0%
Hispanic or Latino (of any race)	60	2.4%

=== 2010 census ===
As of the 2010 census, there were 2,621 people, 952 households, and 635 families residing in the city. The population density was 2,978.4 inhabitants per square mile (1,150.0/km^{2}). There were 1,080 housing units at an average density of 1,227.3 units per square mile (473.9 units/km^{2}). The racial makeup of the city was 42.5% White, 0.2% African American, 50.5% Native American, 1.2% Asian, and 5.5% from two or more races. Hispanic or Latino of any race were 1.6% of the population.

There were 952 households, of which 38.2% had children under the age of 18 living with them, 41.4% were married couples living together, 18.5% had a female householder with no husband present, 6.8% had a male householder with no wife present, and 33.3% were non-families. 27.8% of all households were made up of individuals, and 11.7% had someone living alone who was 65 years of age or older. The average household size was 2.65 and the average family size was 3.25.

The median age in the city was 33.7 years. 29.1% of residents were under the age of 18; 9.3% were between the ages of 18 and 24; 22.7% were from 25 to 44; 26.2% were from 45 to 64; and 12.5% were 65 years of age or older. The gender makeup of the city was 46.9% male and 53.1% female.

=== 2000 census ===
As of the 2000 census, there were 2,663 people, 981 households, and 685 families residing in the city. The population density was 3,024.8 inhabitants per square mile (1,167.9/km^{2}). There were 1,091 housing units at an average density of 1,239.2 units per square mile (478.5 units/km^{2}). The racial makeup of the city was 55.73% White, 0.04% African American, 40.52% Native American, 1.01% Asian, 0.34% from other races, and 2.37% from two or more races. Hispanic or Latino of any race were 1.61% of the population.

There were 981 households, out of which 37.2% had children under the age of 18 living with them, 49.5% were married couples living together, 15.3% had a female householder with no husband present, and 30.1% were non-families. 26.3% of all households were made up of individuals, and 12.6% had someone living alone who was 65 years of age or older. The average household size was 2.63 and the average family size was 3.14.

In the city, the age distribution of the population shows 31.0% under the age of 18, 7.8% from 18 to 24, 25.5% from 25 to 44, 20.0% from 45 to 64, and 15.7% who were 65 years of age or older. The median age was 36 years. For every 100 females, there were 90.8 males. For every 100 females age 18 and over, there were 83.5 males.

The median income for a household in the city was $27,962, and the median income for a family was $33,681. Males had a median income of $26,325 versus $23,333 for females. The per capita income for the city was $13,605. About 17.0% of families and 17.9% of the population were below the poverty line, including 23.1% of those under age 18 and 5.7% of those age 65 or over.

== Arts and culture ==
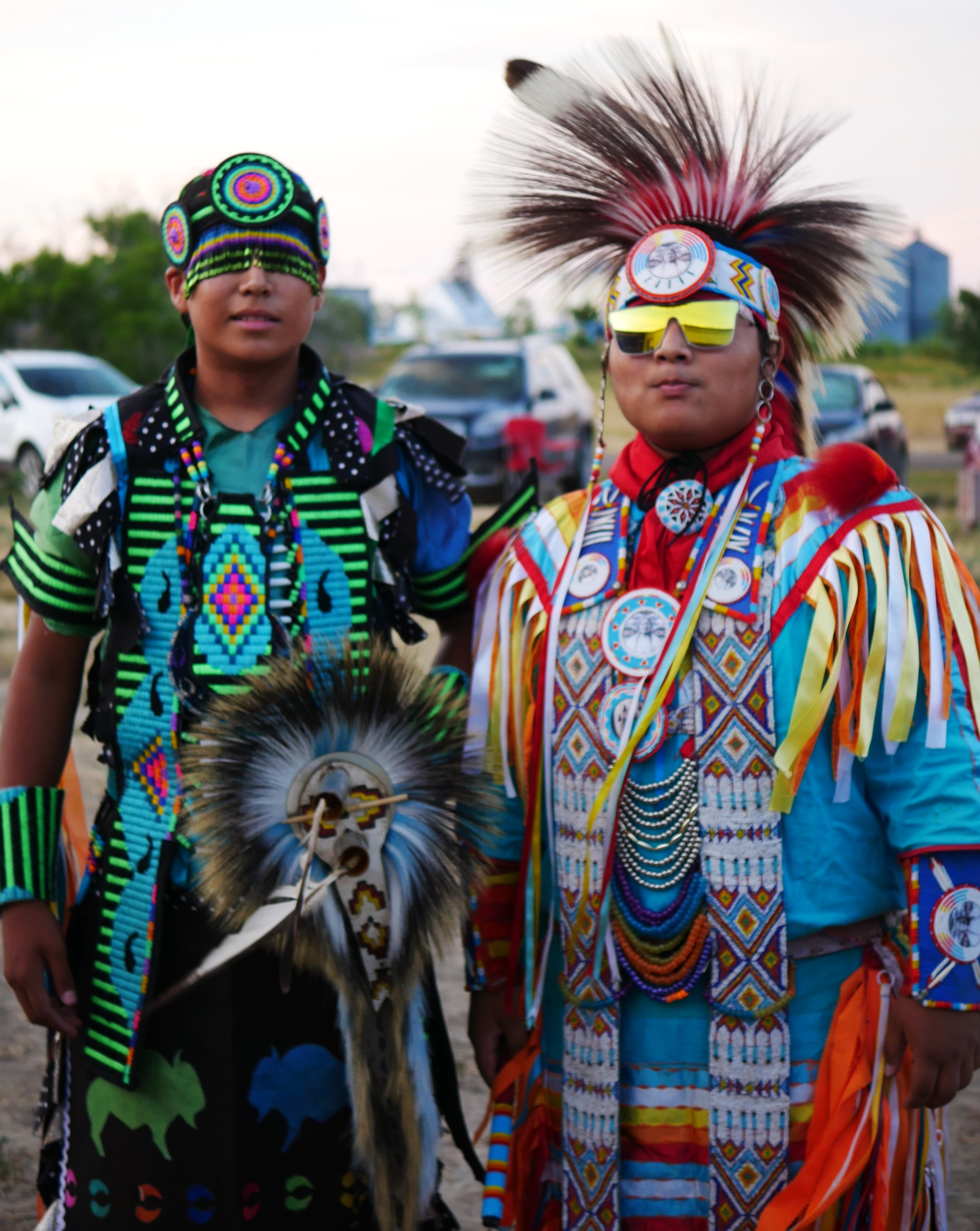
Two young grass dancers at Wadopana 2023

=== Events ===
Wolf Point is the home of the annual Wild Horse Stampede, held every year during the second weekend of July. Wolf Point's Wild Horse Stampede began in 1915 and is the oldest rodeo in Montana. It has been called the "Grandaddy of Montana Rodeos".

Wolf Point is also the home of the Wadopana Pow-wow, the oldest traditional pow-wow in Montana; it is always held the first week in August.

=== Attractions ===
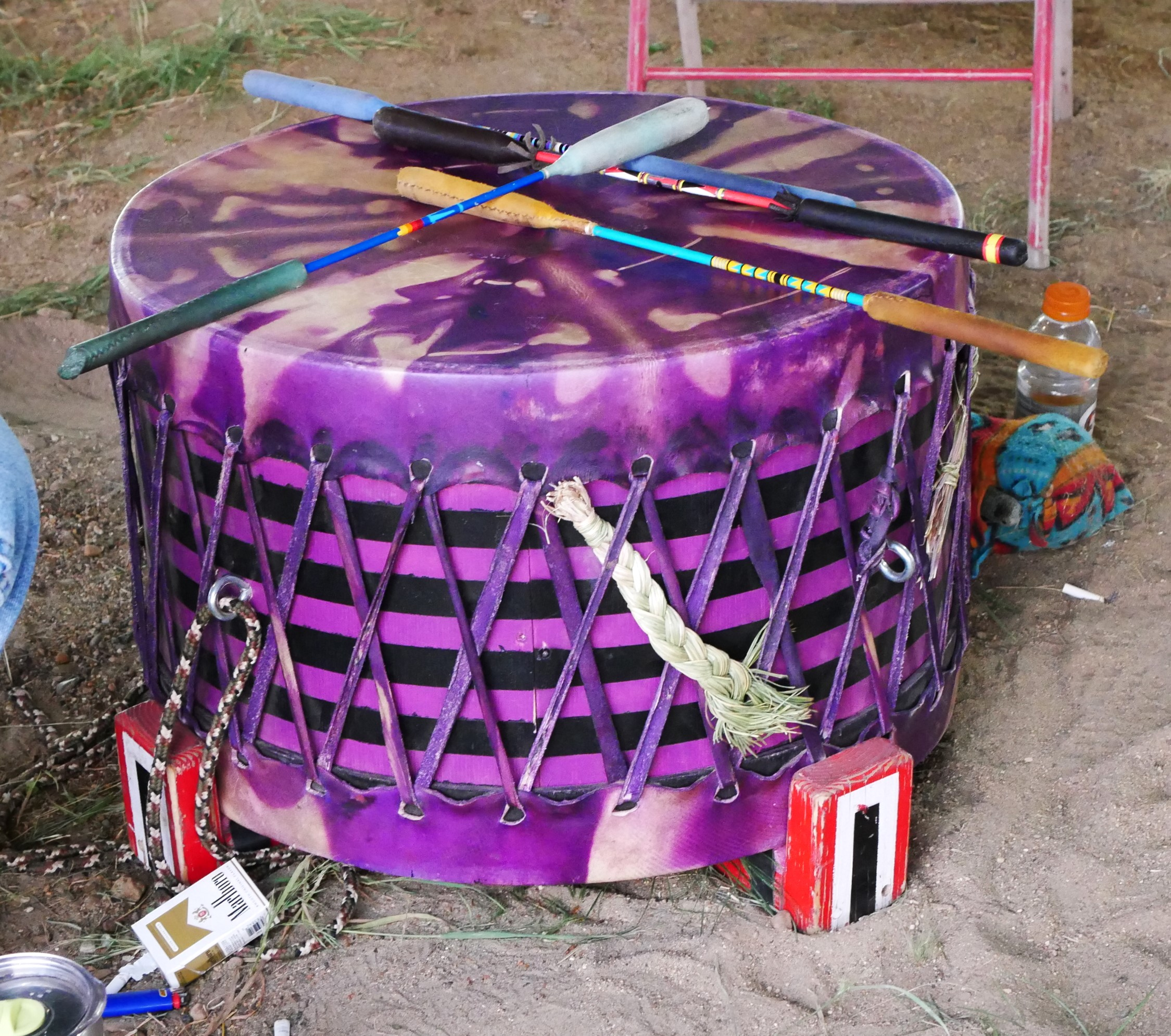
Painted drum at Wadopana 2024

Silverwolf Casino is operated by the Sioux and Assiniboine tribes of the Fort Peck Indian Reservation. The casino also serves as a funeral chapel.

The Wolf Point Area Museum is operated by the local historical society.

Roosevelt County Library is headquartered in Wolf Point with branch locations in Culbertson and Froid.

== Government ==
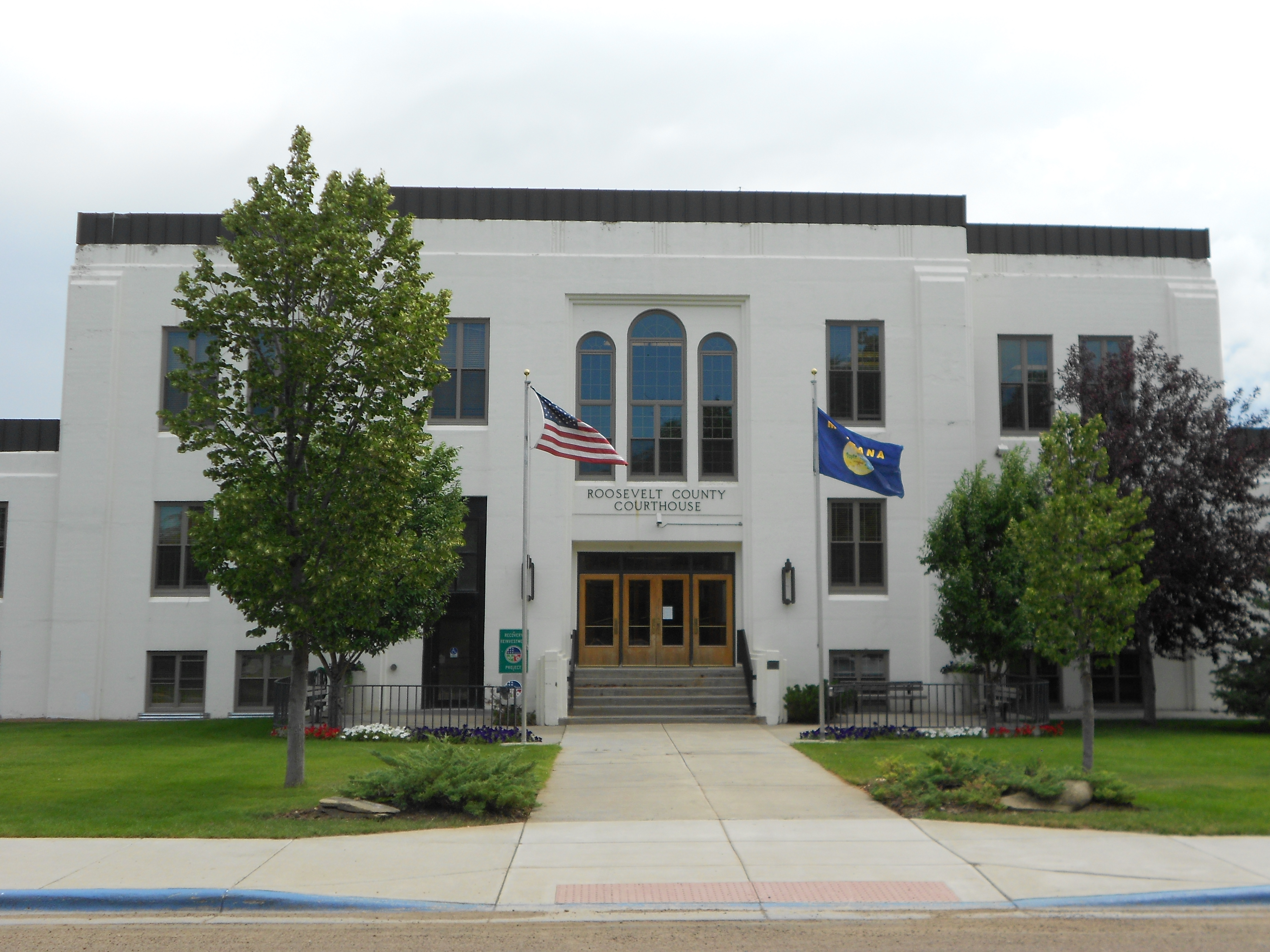
Roosevelt County Courthouse in Wolf Point

The city of Wolf Point has a mayor-council form of government with a city council consisting of eight elected council members—two members from each of four wards. The mayor is elected at-large for a four-year term. The city council determines the policy direction and administers the daily affairs of city government. The mayor appoints, with advice and consent of the council, the city attorney, the hybrid position of city clerk-treasurer, and the police chief. The position of city judge is shared with the Justice of the Peace of Roosevelt County.

=== Mayors ===
Matthew Golik (November 4, 1948 – March 1, 2008) was the mayor between 1999 and 2008. He was appointed mayor in 1999 when the mayor at the time resigned. Golik was elected mayor in his own right in 2001 and re-elected in 2005; he held the post until his death. On March 1, 2008, his three-wheeler went through the ice on Fort Peck Lake where he had been ice fishing and he drowned.

DeWayne W. Jager assumed the duties of the mayor's office following Golik's death as the then city council president and was appointed to the post on March 17, 2008. Mayor Jager was elected to the position in the November 2009 general election, serving until 2013.

Chris M. Dschaak won the election in 2013, 2017, 2021, and 2025.

== Education ==
=== K-12 ===
The Wolf Point Public Schools, District No. 45/45A, operates an elementary, a middle, and a junior/senior high school with a total student enrollment of more than 860 students. Nearby, Frontier Elementary School, District No. 3, serves some rural areas of Roosevelt County and northern McCone County in grades pre-kindergarten through eighth grade, and had an enrollment of more than 100 in the 2010–2011 school year. Wolf Point High School is a Class B school (108-306 students) which helps determine athletic competitions. They are known as the Wolves.

Although Native Americans "make up more than half of the student body", they are "less than one-fifth of the staff," and have a lower graduation rate. In June 2017, a civil rights complaint was filed with the U.S. Department of Education's Office for Civil Rights by the Fort Peck Tribal Executive Board.

=== College ===
Fort Peck Community College expanded to Wolf Point. The new brick facility is located one block south of the center of Main Street. FPCC is a tribal community college that offers affordable Applied Science, Associate Degree, and Transfer programs, and GEDs. In 2009, FPCC initiated men's and women's collegiate basketball teams.

== Media ==
Wolf Point is served by two weekly newspapers, the Northern Plains Independent, and the Poplar, Montana, based Fort Peck Journal. A third paper funded by Fort Peck tribal government, the Wotanin Wowapi, ceased publication on January 28, 2008.

The radio stations KVCK (AM) 1450 and KVCK-FM 92.7 are owned by Wolftrax Broadcasting and licensed in Wolf Point. The public radio station KYPW is also licensed in Wolf Point.

Wolf Point and Roosevelt County are part of the Minot-Bismarck-Dickinson local television media market (DMA). Broadcast television can be received, either directly or via translator, from KWSE 4 (PBS), KUMV 8 (NBC), and KXMD 11 (CBS) all based in Williston, North Dakota; and KFBB 5 (ABC/FOX) based in Great Falls, Montana.

== Infrastructure ==
=== Transportation ===
==== Air ====
Scheduled air service at Wolf Point's L. M. Clayton Airport is provided by Cape Air, the designated United States Department of Transportation (USDOT) Essential Air Service (EAS) operator, with direct daily flights to Billings and Glasgow, Montana. The Essential Air Service contract had formerly been held by now-defunct Big Sky Airlines and Great Lakes Airlines.

==== Highways ====
U.S. Route 2, a major east–west route in the northern tier of states, connects Wolf Point with other Hi-Line communities from Washington state to the Upper Peninsula of Michigan. Montana Highway 25 provides a connection to Montana Highway 13, six miles east of the city. Montana Highway 13 extends from the Port of Scobey on the Canada–United States border in the north to Circle, Montana in the south.

==== Rail ====
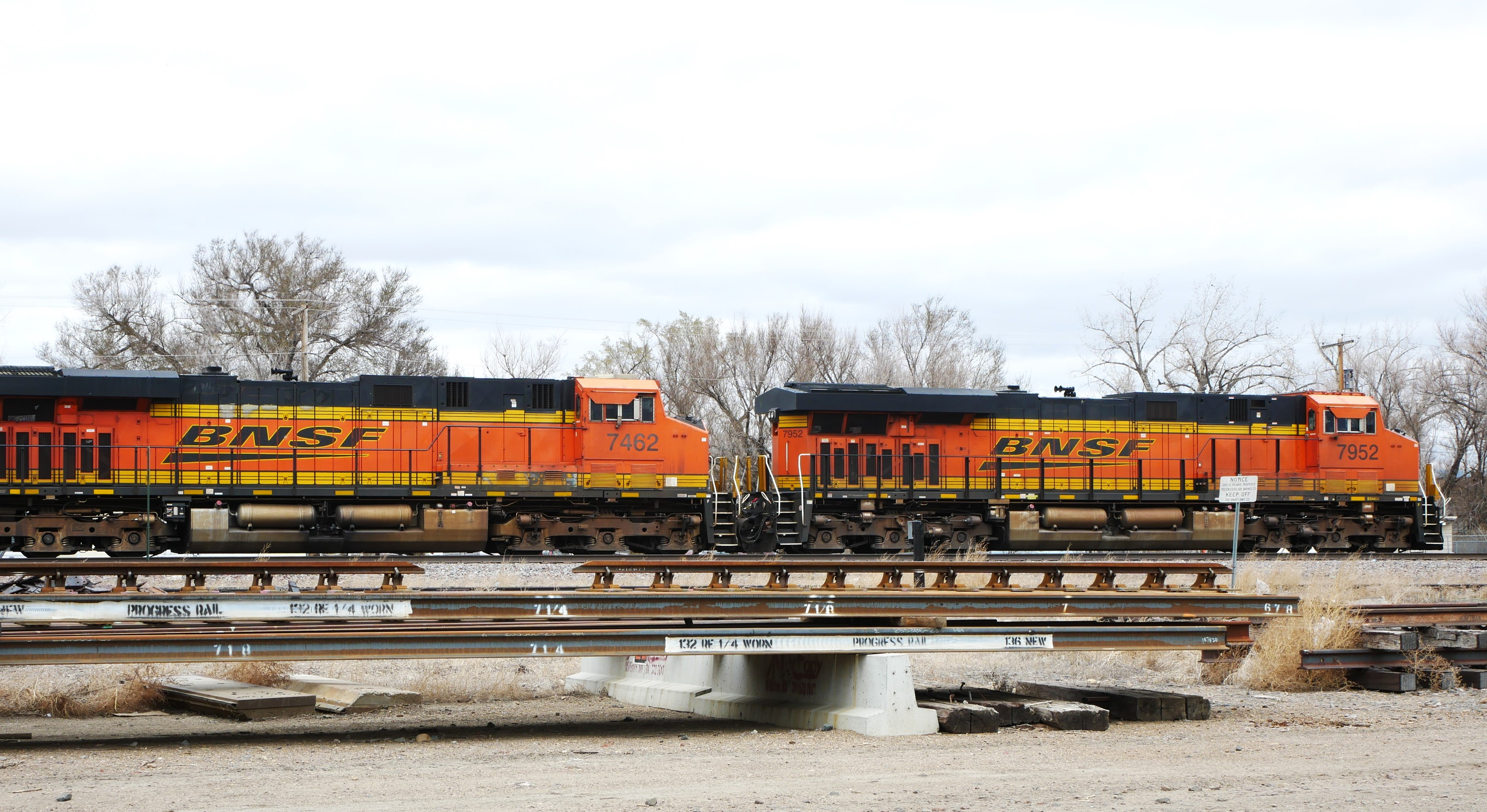
BNSF engines and train stopped briefly in Wolf Point Montana (east bound)

Wolf Point is located on the Hi-Line of the BNSF Railway and has developed as a major shipment point for grain to West Coast and Great Lakes ports. Wolf Point is served daily westbound and eastbound by Amtrak's Empire Builder, and is the first station stop west of Williston, North Dakota.

=== Medical facilities ===
Trinity Hospital offers inpatient care, and emergency care in addition to a wide range of other services, and is operated by Northeast Montana Health Services (NEMHS). NEMHS also operates the Faith Lutheran Home, a 60-bed skilled nursing facility; and the Listerud Rural Health Clinic in Wolf Point. The Chief Redstone Clinic is a facility operated by the Indian Health Service, an agency of the U.S. Department of Health and Human Services. It supports a wide range of health needs for the Native American population in the Wolf Point area on an outpatient basis.

== Notable people ==
- Hank Adams (1943–2020), Native American rights activist
- Dolly Akers, first Native American woman elected to Montana Legislature
- Nancy Dumont, educator
- Robert V. Dumont Jr., educator
- Casey FitzSimmons (born 1980), National Football League player
- Lisa Lockhart, rodeo performer
- John Lowenstein (born 1947), former Major League Baseball player
- Kameron (Kam) Mickolio (born 1984), former Major League relief pitcher
- Montie Montana (1910–1998), rodeo trick rider, possibly born in or around Wolf Point
- Dan Pyle, artist
- Ted Schwinden (1925–2023), Democratic Governor of Montana (1981–1989)
- Bridget Smith, member of Montana House of Representatives

== References in literature ==
- The novel Surrender the Dead is a psychological thriller set in Wolf Point, Montana.
- William Least Heat-Moon wrote about the night he spent here in his autobiographical book Blue Highways: A Journey Into America.
- In the fictional Marvel Comics Universe the superhero Red Wolf (William Talltrees) was born in Wolf Point, on a Cheyenne Reservation.

== See also ==
- List of state highways in Montana
