= Nashua, Montana =

Nashua, Montana Pʿahį́ Wakpá (Assiniboine)
- Town
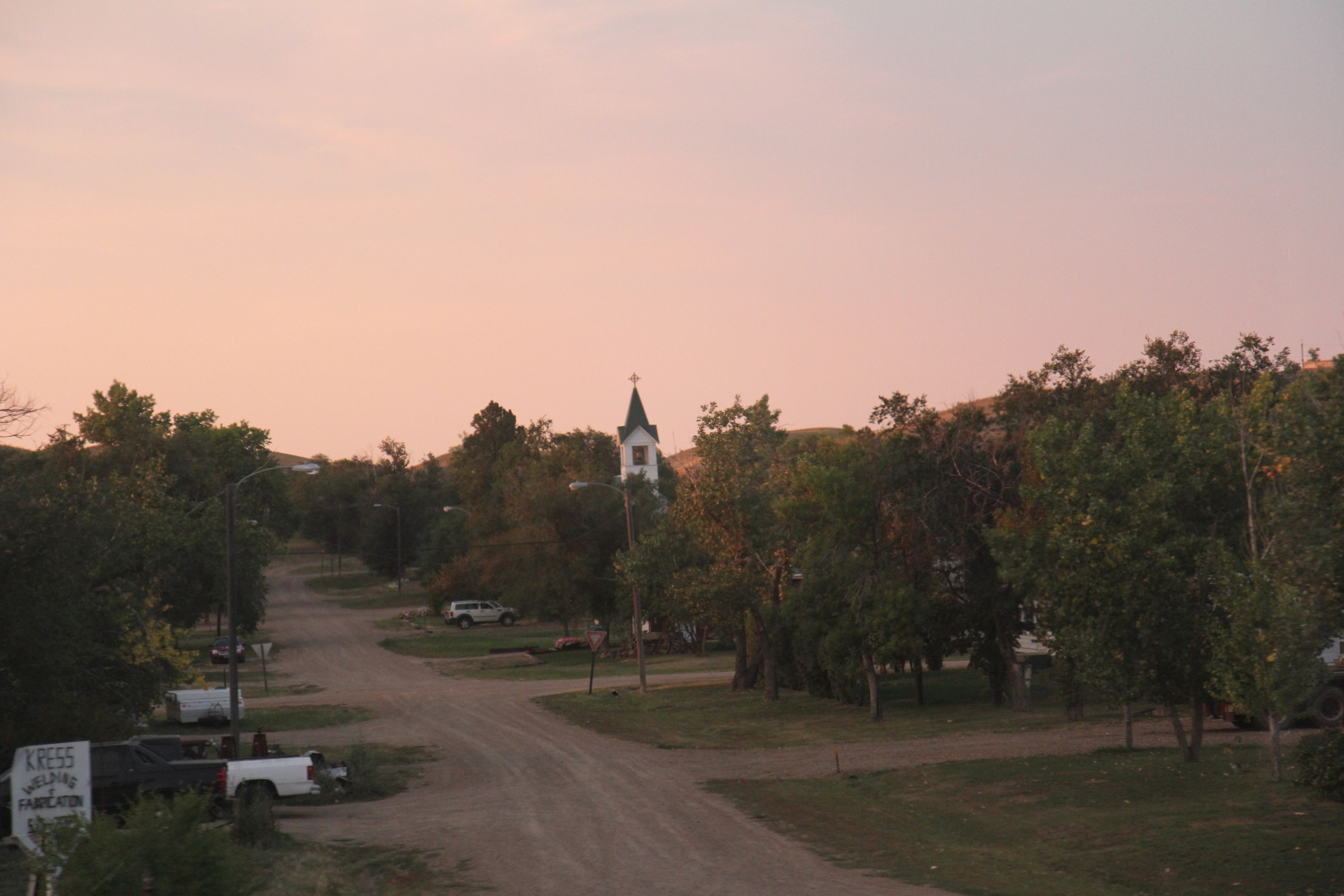
- Charles Street in Nashua at sunset

- Location of Nashua, Montana
- Coordinates: 48°08′01″N 106°21′26″W
- Country: United States
- State: Montana
- County: Valley

Area
  - Total: 0.71 sq mi (1.83 km^{2})
  - Land: 0.71 sq mi (1.83 km^{2})
  - Water: 0 sq mi (0.00 km^{2})
- Elevation: 2,067 ft (630 m)

Population (2020)
  - Total: 301
  - Density: 426.8/sq mi (164.79/km^{2})
- Time zone: UTC-7 (Mountain (MST))
  - Summer (DST): UTC-6 (MDT)
- ZIP code: 59248
- Area code: 406
- FIPS code: 30-52900
- GNIS feature ID: 2413034
- Website: townofnashuamt.org

Nashua is a town in Valley County, Montana, United States. The population was 301 at the 2020 census.

The town was established as a station on the St. Paul, Minneapolis & Manitoba Railway in 1888. Nashua had a brief economic boom during the building of Fort Peck Dam in the 1930s.

== Geography ==
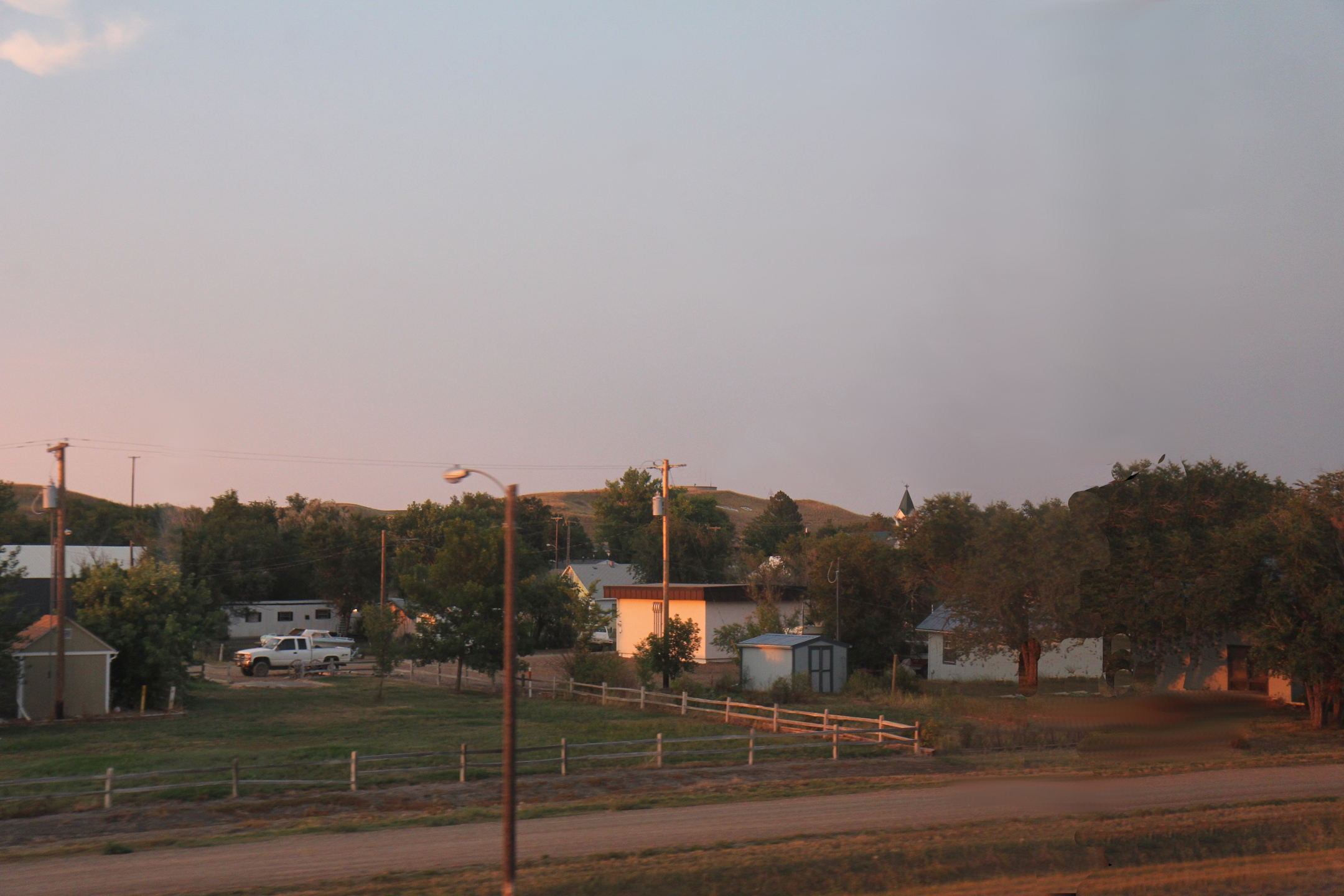
Panorama of Nashua in 2013

According to the United States Census Bureau, the town has a total area of 0.66 square miles (1.71 km^{2}), all land.

=== Climate ===
According to the Köppen Climate Classification system, Nashua has a semi-arid climate, abbreviated "BSk" on climate maps.

== Demographics ==
Historical population
Census	Pop.	Note	%±
1920	272		—
1930	351		29.0%
1940	943		168.7%
1950	691		−26.7%
1960	796		15.2%
1970	513		−35.6%
1980	495		−3.5%
1990	375		−24.2%
2000	325		−13.3%
2010	290		−10.8%
2020	301		3.8%
U.S. Decennial Census

=== 2010 census ===
As of the census of 2010, there were 290 people, 136 households, and 85 families residing in the town. The population density was 439.4 inhabitants per square mile (169.7/km^{2}). There were 183 housing units at an average density of 277.3 per square mile (107.1/km^{2}). The racial makeup of the town was 94.5% White, 2.8% Native American, 0.3% Asian, 0.3% from other races, and 2.1% from two or more races. Hispanic or Latino of any race were 1.4% of the population.

There were 136 households, of which 23.5% had children under the age of 18 living with them, 50.0% were married couples living together, 6.6% had a female householder with no husband present, 5.9% had a male householder with no wife present, and 37.5% were non-families. 35.3% of all households were made up of individuals, and 14% had someone living alone who was 65 years of age or older. The average household size was 2.13 and the average family size was 2.66.

The median age in the town was 50.8 years. 19.7% of residents were under the age of 18; 4.4% were between the ages of 18 and 24; 18.9% were from 25 to 44; 35.4% were from 45 to 64; and 21.4% were 65 years of age or older. The gender makeup of the town was 53.1% male and 46.9% female.

=== 2000 census ===
As of the census of 2000, there were 325 people, 166 households, and 92 families residing in the town. The population density was 489.1 inhabitants per square mile (188.8/km^{2}). There were 195 housing units at an average density of 293.4 per square mile (113.3/km^{2}). The racial makeup of the town was 92.00% White, 0.31% African American, 5.54% Native American, 0.31% Asian, 0.31% from other races, and 1.54% from two or more races. Hispanic or Latino of any race were 2.15% of the population.

There were 166 households, out of which 15.1% had children under the age of 18 living with them, 50.0% were married couples living together, 1.2% had a female householder with no husband present, and 44.0% were non-families. 41.0% of all households were made up of individuals, and 21.7% had someone living alone who was 65 years of age or older. The average household size was 1.96 and the average family size was 2.61.

In the town, the population was spread out, with 14.8% under the age of 18, 6.2% from 18 to 24, 21.2% from 25 to 44, 32.0% from 45 to 64, and 25.8% who were 65 years of age or older. The median age was 49 years. For every 100 females there were 127.3 males. For every 100 females age 18 and over, there were 16.4 males.

The median income for a household in the town was $26,827, and the median income for a family was $35,000. Males had a median income of $26,250 versus $17,188 for females. The per capita income for the town was $15,452. About 1.0% of families and 4.3% of the population were below the poverty line, including none of those under age 18 and 5.3% of those age 65 or over.

== Transportation ==
Amtrak’s Empire Builder, which operates between Seattle/Portland and Chicago, passes through the town on BNSF tracks, but makes no stop. The nearest station is located in Glasgow, 15 miles (24 km) to the west.

== High school ==
Despite the small number of students in the town's high school (7–12 in a graduating class), basketball, track and field, volleyball, cheerleading as well as American football are accessible to all students because of cooperation with a neighboring high school. The school also offers the possibility of joining the Art Club or the FCCLA (Family, Career and Community Leaders of America) Club. Nashua High School's team name is the Porcupines.
