= Circle, Montana =

- Town
- Circle water tower

- Location in McCone County and the state of Montana
- Coordinates: 47°25′04″N 105°35′13″W
- Country: United States
- State: Montana
- County: McCone

Area
  - Total: 0.78 sq mi (2.02 km^{2})
  - Land: 0.78 sq mi (2.02 km^{2})
  - Water: 0 sq mi (0.00 km^{2})
- Elevation: 2,438 ft (743 m)

Population (2020)
  - Total: 591
  - Density: 757.9/sq mi (292.64/km^{2})
- Time zone: UTC-7 (Mountain (MST))
  - Summer (DST): UTC-6 (MDT)
- ZIP code: 59215
- Area code: 406
- FIPS code: 30-14950
- GNIS feature ID: 2413204
- Website: www.townofcircle.org

Circle is a town in and the county seat of McCone County, Montana, United States. The population was 591 at the 2020 census.

The community was so named because a rancher there branded his cattle with the image of a circle.

== History ==
After arriving in 1905, the town's founder Peter Rorvik opened the post office and a general store. In 1909 homesteaders began moving to the area. Then in 1914 the Great Northern Railway built a new station.

In 1951 oil was discovered southeast of Circle. This led to a temporary population spike. The 1960 census of 1,117 was the highest ever recorded for the town.

== Geography ==
Circle is in southeastern McCone County along Montana Highway 200 (B Avenue), which leads east-northeast 75 miles (121 km) to Sidney and west 66 miles (106 km) to Jordan. Highway 200S branches off Highway 200 just east of Circle and leads southeast 49 miles (79 km) to Glendive. Highway 13 leads north from Circle 53 miles (85 km) to Wolf Point.

According to the United States Census Bureau, the town has a total area of 0.78 square miles (2.02 km^{2}), all of it recorded as land. The Redwater River runs just east of the city, crossing into the city limits briefly. Horse Creek, a tributary of the Redwater, runs through the northern part of the city. The Redwater flows northeast to the Missouri River near Poplar.

Circle was initially formed as a ranching and farming community thanks to the wide open plains. Agriculture is still a mainstay of the economy.

=== Climate ===
According to the Köppen Climate Classification system, Circle has a semi-arid climate, abbreviated "BSk" on climate maps.

Climate data for Circle, Montana, 1991–2020 normals, extremes 1963–present
Month	Jan	Feb	Mar	Apr	May	Jun	Jul	Aug	Sep	Oct	Nov	Dec	Year
Record high °F (°C)	65 (18)	70 (21)	83 (28)	92 (33)	101 (38)	107 (42)	112 (44)	109 (43)	105 (41)	94 (34)	79 (26)	68 (20)	112 (44)
Mean maximum °F (°C)	48.9 (9.4)	53.2 (11.8)	68.4 (20.2)	78.4 (25.8)	85.6 (29.8)	93.0 (33.9)	98.8 (37.1)	99.0 (37.2)	94.5 (34.7)	81.9 (27.7)	66.2 (19.0)	51.9 (11.1)	100.8 (38.2)
Mean daily maximum °F (°C)	28.5 (−1.9)	32.6 (0.3)	45.5 (7.5)	58.1 (14.5)	68.3 (20.2)	77.7 (25.4)	87.1 (30.6)	86.8 (30.4)	75.5 (24.2)	58.8 (14.9)	42.8 (6.0)	31.5 (−0.3)	57.8 (14.3)
Daily mean °F (°C)	18.1 (−7.7)	22.1 (−5.5)	33.6 (0.9)	44.9 (7.2)	55.0 (12.8)	64.3 (17.9)	72.1 (22.3)	71.1 (21.7)	60.3 (15.7)	46.0 (7.8)	32.0 (0.0)	21.3 (−5.9)	45.1 (7.3)
Mean daily minimum °F (°C)	7.8 (−13.4)	11.5 (−11.4)	21.6 (−5.8)	31.7 (−0.2)	41.7 (5.4)	50.9 (10.5)	57.1 (13.9)	55.4 (13.0)	45.2 (7.3)	33.1 (0.6)	21.2 (−6.0)	11.0 (−11.7)	32.4 (0.2)
Mean minimum °F (°C)	−23.3 (−30.7)	−15.5 (−26.4)	−5.4 (−20.8)	13.5 (−10.3)	25.1 (−3.8)	37.0 (2.8)	44.5 (6.9)	39.9 (4.4)	27.8 (−2.3)	12.2 (−11.0)	−3.7 (−19.8)	−17.7 (−27.6)	−29.9 (−34.4)
Record low °F (°C)	−42 (−41)	−38 (−39)	−39 (−39)	−9 (−23)	17 (−8)	27 (−3)	35 (2)	27 (−3)	15 (−9)	−9 (−23)	−31 (−35)	−46 (−43)	−46 (−43)
Average precipitation inches (mm)	0.40 (10)	0.37 (9.4)	0.49 (12)	1.38 (35)	2.55 (65)	2.64 (67)	2.14 (54)	1.40 (36)	1.33 (34)	0.93 (24)	0.36 (9.1)	0.46 (12)	14.45 (367.5)
Average precipitation days (≥ 0.01 in)	4.6	4.1	4.4	5.3	7.4	8.6	6.6	4.2	4.5	4.3	3.7	4.4	62.1
Source 1: NOAAall-time extreme
Source 2: National Weather Service

== Demographics ==
Historical population
Census	Pop.	Note	%±
1930	519		—
1940	685		32.0%
1950	856		25.0%
1960	1,117		30.5%
1970	964		−13.7%
1980	931		−3.4%
1990	805		−13.5%
2000	644		−20.0%
2010	615		−4.5%
2020	591		−3.9%
U.S. Decennial Census

=== 2010 census ===
As of the census of 2010, there were 615 people, 278 households, and 159 families living in the town. The population density was 788.5 inhabitants per square mile (304.4/km^{2}). There were 343 housing units at an average density of 439.7 per square mile (169.8/km^{2}). The racial makeup of the town was 97.7% White, 0.2% African American, 0.2% Native American, 0.3% Asian, and 1.6% from two or more races. Hispanic or Latino of any race were 1.6% of the population.

There were 278 households, of which 25.9% had children under the age of 18 living with them, 50.0% were married couples living together, 5.4% had a female householder with no husband present, 1.8% had a male householder with no wife present, and 42.8% were non-families. 39.2% of all households were made up of individuals, and 21.9% had someone living alone who was 65 years of age or older. The average household size was 2.14 and the average family size was 2.88.

The median age in the town was 45.9 years. 23.3% of residents were under the age of 18; 6.3% were between the ages of 18 and 24; 18.9% were from 25 to 44; 25.6% were from 45 to 64; and 26% were 65 years of age or older. The gender makeup of the town was 46.8% male and 53.2% female.

=== 2000 census ===
As of the census of 2000, there were 644 people, 291 households, and 185 families living in the town. The population density was 815.1 inhabitants per square mile (314.7/km^{2}). There were 384 housing units at an average density of 486.0 per square mile (187.6/km^{2}). The racial makeup of the town was 96.89% White, 0.78% African American, 0.93% Native American, and 1.40% from two or more races. Hispanic or Latino of any race were 1.09% of the population.

There were 291 households, out of which 27.8% had children under the age of 18 living with them, 56.0% were married couples living together, 5.5% had a female householder with no husband present, and 36.1% were non-families. 34.4% of all households were made up of individuals, and 19.6% had someone living alone who was 65 years of age or older. The average household size was 2.21 and the average family size was 2.84.

In the town, the population was spread out, with 23.9% under the age of 18, 6.5% from 18 to 24, 24.2% from 25 to 44, 23.6% from 45 to 64, and 21.7% who were 65 years of age or older. The median age was 42 years. For every 100 females there were 87.8 males. For every 100 females age 18 and over, there were 90.7 males.

The median income for a household in the town was $27,500, and the median income for a family was $36,354. Males had a median income of $28,125 versus $12,917 for females. The per capita income for the town was $13,412. About 16.2% of families and 18.3% of the population were below the poverty line, including 17.9% of those under age 18 and 15.3% of those age 65 or over.

== Arts and culture ==
The McCone County Museum is in Circle. It focuses on area history and includes a wildlife collection. The old Northern Pacific depot is located on site.

Every August, Circle hosts the County Fair which includes a PRCA rodeo. In September they have the Town and Country Day celebration. This includes a parade, shooting events, car races, and a town BBQ.

George McCone Memorial County Library provides service to the area.

== Government ==
Circle has a mayor and three councilmembers. In 2025 Bryan Shennum was elected mayor. He replaced Garry Johnson who did not run for re-election.

== Education ==
Circle Public Schools educates students from kindergarten through 12th grade. The team name for Circle High School is the Wildcats. In 2022, the high school had 64 students and 6.75 full-time equivalency teachers.

== Media ==
The newspaper for McCone County is The Circle Banner. It is published weekly.

The FM radio station KMGT is licensed in Circle. It is run by the local high school.

== Infrastructure ==
Montana Highway 200 passes through town from north to south. The southern end of Montana Highway 13 begins in Circle.

Circle Town County Airport is a public use airport located 1 mile east of town. The nearest commercial airport is L. M. Clayton Airport in Wolf Point. It has limited regional flights.

McCone County Health Center and McCone Clinic are responsible for healthcare in the region.

Mid-Rivers Communications provides for telephone, wireless, internet and cable TV service.

== Notable people ==
- Ron Ehli, Montana state representative
- Alzira Peirce, artist
- David Rorvik, journalist and author
- Jerry Schillinger, Montana state representative
