= Montana Department of Transportation =

Government agency in Montana, United States

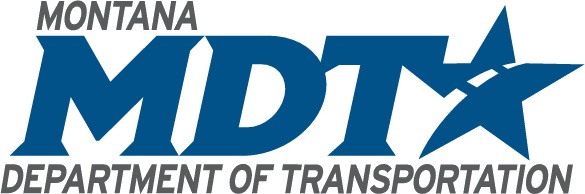

Agency overview
- Formed: 1991; 35 years ago
- Preceding agency: Montana Highway Department
- Jurisdiction: State of Montana
- Headquarters: 2701 Prospect Avenue; Helena, Montana 59620-1001
- Agency executive: Christopher Dorrington, Director
- Parent agency: State of Montana
- Website: mdt.mt.gov

The Montana Department of Transportation (MDT) is a governmental agency in the U.S. state of Montana, responsible for numerous programs related to the construction, maintenance, and monitoring of Montana's transportation infrastructure and operations. While most of MDT's programs relate to the state's highway network, Montana's railroads and airports are also under the agency's purview.

== Responsibilities ==
The responsibilities of the department include:

- Designing and constructing roads and bridges
- Maintaining roads, bridges, and rest areas
- Collecting and enforcing fuel taxes
- Enforcing safety, size, and weight laws for commercial vehicles
- Managing the state motor pool
- Designing and testing materials
- Acquiring property
- Enforcing Outdoor Advertising Control Act
- Planning public transport and rail programs
- Planning general aviation airports
- Performing air search and rescue
- Performing snow removal on roads

== History ==
In March 1913, a state Highway Commission was created by the legislature, consisting of three members. George R. Metlen was the first chief engineer and the only paid member of the commission. The commission's budget was $5,000 per year. In July 1916, the First Federal Road Act gave $1.5 million to construct roads and bridges. The commission was expanded in March 1917 to include 12 members and a three-person executive committee. In 1919, a State Highway Department was formed. Four districts were created to cover the entire state. A three cent gas tax was implemented in November 1926 to provide funding for the department, in addition to federal funding. During the Great Depression $1.5 million of debenture bonds were issued on future gas tax revenue. In 1933, the state received $6 million from the New Deal for construction of roads. In 1935, newly appointed Chief Highway Engineer D. A. McKinnon reorganized the department to include several new divisions. The Highway Commission was reorganized to five members in 1941. The passing of the Federal-Aid Highway Act of 1956 gave major funding to the department and required it to be greatly expanded. In 1957, the four districts were replaced with five districts. The department moved to a new Highway Complex in 1978. In 1991, the Highway Department was reorganized and became the Montana Department of Transportation. The department's centennial year was celebrated in 2013.

== Structure ==
MDT is headed by a director who reports to the governor. Below the director is the deputy director. Also on this level is a five-member transportation commission, a nine-member aeronautics board, legal services, and public information services. The Transportation Commission's responsibilities include selecting projects, awarding contracts, designating roads to highway systems, and resolving outdoor advertising issues. The Aeronautics Board has authority over airport loan and grant funds and advises the rest of the department. The next level of the department is divided into five districts serving different areas of the state:

- District 1: Missoula
- District 2: Butte
- District 3: Great Falls
- District 4: Glendive
- District 5: Billings

The department also contains the following divisions:

- Administrative Division
- Aeronautics Division
- Information Services Division
- Highways and Engineering Division
- Human Resources and Occupational Safety Division
- Maintenance Division
- Motor Carrier Services Division
- Rail, Transit, and Planning Division

== Funding ==
The department does not receive any funding from the state's general fund. All revenue comes from federal sources and state sources including the gas tax and vehicle fees. This is split as 88.5% federal and 11.5% state. The money is put into the Highway State Special Revenue Account and can only be used for transportation related purposes. The department receives $2.27 from the federal government for every $1 it contributes to the Federal Highway Trust Fund. It receives 1% of the annual national highway funding. In the 2016 fiscal year, the department had $290,129,849 in revenue and $296,968,463 in expenditures. Increasing costs outpacing current revenue is causing the department to fall behind on maintenance of infrastructure by $1 billion each year.

== Initiatives ==
The Adopt-A-Highway program helps to maintain scenic beauty by removing litter along roads. Participants agree to clean up litter at least three times a year for two years along an assigned two mile stretch of road.

== See also ==
- List of state highways in Montana
- U.S. Department of Transportation
