= National Register of Historic Places listings in Valley County, Montana =

Location of Valley County in Montana

This is a list of the National Register of Historic Places listings in Valley County, Montana. It is intended to be a complete list of the properties and districts on the National Register of Historic Places in Valley County, Montana, United States. The locations of National Register properties and districts for which the latitude and longitude coordinates are included below, may be seen in a map.

There are 13 properties and districts listed on the National Register in the county.

This National Park Service list is complete through NPS recent listings posted March 14, 2025.

== Listings county-wide ==
	Name on the Register	Image	Date listed	Location	City or town	Description
1	Administration Building	Administration Building	August 13, 1986 (#86002058)	E. Kansas Ave. 48°00′36″N 106°26′41″W	Fort Peck	
2	Employee's Hotel and Garage	Employee's Hotel and Garage	August 13, 1986 (#86002060)	S. Missouri Ave. 48°00′32″N 106°26′47″W	Fort Peck	
3	First National Bank of Glasgow	First National Bank of Glasgow	June 27, 2002 (#02000698)	110 5th St., S. 48°11′40″N 106°38′07″W	Glasgow	
4	Fort Peck Dam	Fort Peck Dam	August 13, 1986 (#86002061)	On the Missouri River; 48°00′17″N 106°25′10″W	Fort Peck	
5	Fort Peck Original Houses Historic District	Fort Peck Original Houses Historic District	August 13, 1986 (#86002067)	1101-1112 E. Kansas Ave. 48°00′40″N 106°26′47″W	Fort Peck	
6	Fort Peck Theatre	Fort Peck Theatre	June 27, 1983 (#83001077)	Missouri Ave. 48°00′27″N 106°27′00″W	Fort Peck	
7	Garage and Fire Station	Garage and Fire Station	August 13, 1986 (#86002063)	Gasconade St. 48°00′29″N 106°26′51″W	Fort Peck	
8	Glasgow Army Airfield Norden Bombsight Storage Vault		November 18, 2011 (#11000824)	0.5 miles (0.80 km) north of Glasgow; 48°13′13″N 106°36′33″W	Glasgow vicinity	See also Second--Generation Norden Bombsight Vault, McCook, Nebraska
9	Hospital	Hospital	August 13, 1986 (#86002054)	S. Platte St. 48°00′28″N 106°26′40″W	Fort Peck	
10	Recreation Hall	Recreation Hall	August 13, 1986 (#86002066)	Missouri Ave. 48°00′20″N 106°27′01″W	Fort Peck	
11	Rundle Building	Rundle Building	November 29, 2006 (#06001092)	208 5th St., S. 48°11′38″N 106°38′13″W	Glasgow	
12	Charles C. Sargent House	Charles C. Sargent House	July 8, 1982 (#82003180)	615 Front St. 48°07′56″N 106°21′17″W	Nashua	
13	US Post Office and Courthouse-Glasgow Main	US Post Office and Courthouse-Glasgow Main	March 21, 1986 (#86000679)	605 2nd Ave., S. 48°11′40″N 106°38′18″W	Glasgow	

== See also ==
- List of National Historic Landmarks in Montana
- National Register of Historic Places listings in Montana
