= Horse's Ghost =

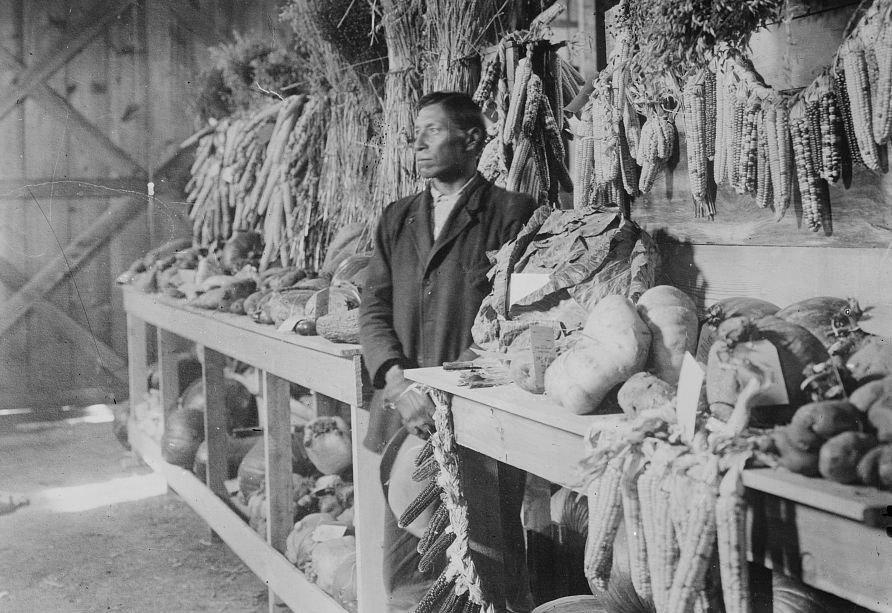
- Horse's Ghost at the fair, Poplar, Montana

Sioux leader

Personal details
- Known for: Trip to Washington to argue for Native American rights with Major Charles B. Lohmiller

Horse's Ghost was a Sioux Chief in Montana at the Fort Peck Indian Reservation who advocated for Native American rights with members of President Taft's administration.

== Biography ==
In 1911 he went to Washington with Major Charles B. Lohmiller to advocate for Native American rights with members of President Taft's administration.

In 1913 he took part in the National Reliability Tour sponsored by the American Automobile Association.
