= Yellow Shoe =

Yellow Shoe may refer to:

- Yellow Indian Shoe
- Charles B. Lohmiller, known as "Yellow Shoes"
