= Fort Peck Indian Reservation =

Indian reservation in Montana, United States

Fort Peck Indian Reservation Húdam Wįcášta (Assiniboine) Waxchį́ca Oyáte (Dakota)
- Indian reservation
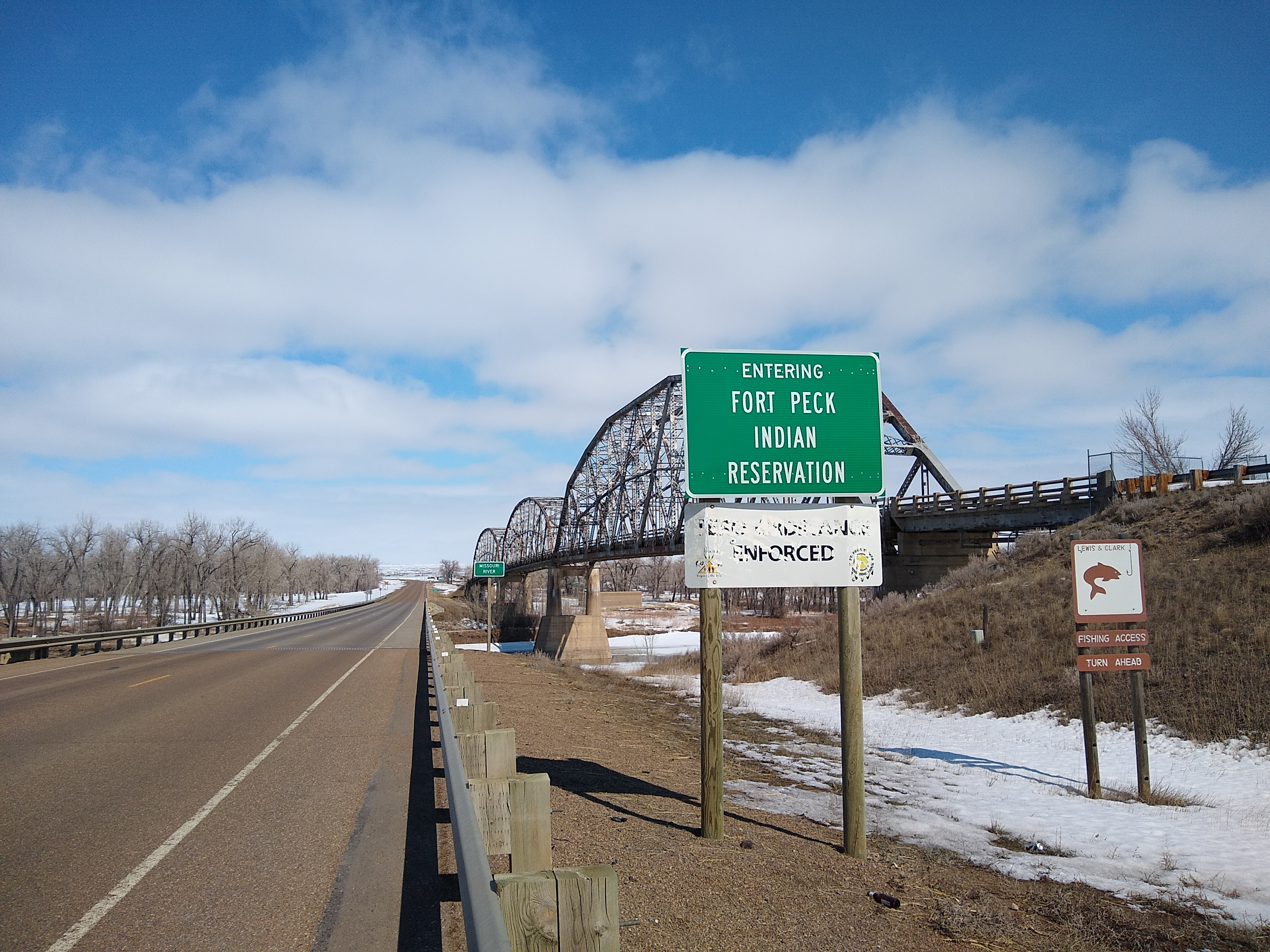
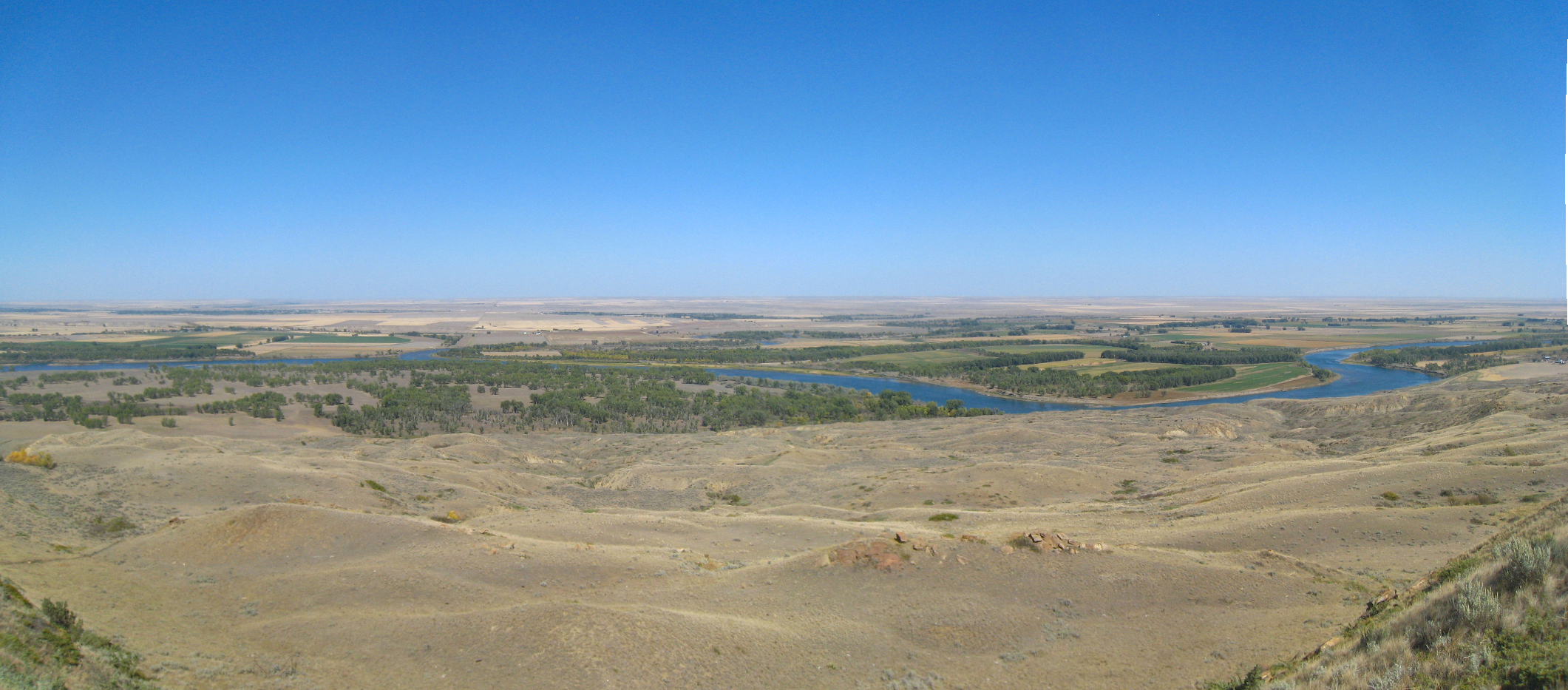
- Fort Peck Reservation sign on Highway 13 Missouri River below Fort Peck Dam

- Location in Montana
- Coordinates: 48°21′40″N 105°32′18″W
- Tribe: Fort Peck Assiniboine and Sioux
- Country: United States
- State: Montana
- Counties: Daniels; Roosevelt; Sheridan; Valley
- Established: 1878
- Headquarters: Poplar

Government
  - Body: Fort Peck Tribal Executive Board
  - Chairman: Floyd Azure
  - Vice-Chairman: Charles Headdress

Area
  - Total: 3,200 sq mi (8,300 km^{2})

Dimensions
  - Length: 110 mi (180 km)
  - Width: 40 mi (64 km)

Population (2017)
  - Total: 10,374
  - Density: 3.2/sq mi (1.3/km^{2})
- Time zone: UTC-7 (MST)
  - Summer (DST): UTC-6 (MDT)
- Area code: 406
- GDP: $385.9 Million (2018)
- Website: fortpecktribes.org

The Fort Peck Indian Reservation (Assiniboine: húdam wįcášta, Dakota: Waxchį́ca oyáte) is located near Fort Peck, Montana, in the northeast part of the state. It is the home of several federally recognized bands of Assiniboine, Lakota, and Dakota peoples of Native Americans.

With a total land area of 2,094,000 acres (8,470 km^{2}; 3,272 sq mi), it is the ninth-largest Indian reservation in the United States. These lands are spread across parts of four counties. In descending order of land area they are Roosevelt, Valley, Daniels, and Sheridan counties. Its resident population was 10,381 in 2000. The largest community on the reservation is the city of Wolf Point.

== History ==
=== 1850s–1870s ===
The federal government established the Great Sioux Reservation under the Fort Laramie Treaty of 1868, encompassing much of the area of West River in what is now South Dakota, as well as portions of North Dakota and Nebraska. As some bands of the Sioux agreed to come into agencies, others chose to resist. Army efforts to bring in the other Sioux (characterized as "hostiles") led to battles in the Rosebud country and culminated in the Battle of the Little Bighorn in 1876. The United States forces were roundly defeated there.

As the victors dispersed, Sitting Bull led followers north into the Red Water country. The Hunkpapa and assorted Teton peoples gained some supplies from contact with the Sioux at what was then known as the Fort Peck Agency. When military pressure increased in 1877, Sitting Bull led most of his followers over the border into Canada. The federal government increased its military forces in the area in an effort to induce Sitting Bull to surrender.

In 1878, the Fort Peck Indian Agency was relocated to its present-day location in Poplar, Montana, because the original agency was located on a flood plain, which flooded every spring. The current Camp Poplar (located at Fort Peck Agency) was established in 1880. That year, Presbyterian missionary Rev. G.W. Wood, Jr. came from Northern Michigan with his family to lead the Poplar Creek mission. Without supplies and barely tolerated by the First Nations peoples in the area of present-day southern Saskatchewan, who were dealing with limited resources, Sitting Bull returned to the United States. He surrendered at Fort Buford on July 19, 1881. Some of his Hunkpapa stragglers intermarried with other Native Americans at Fort Peck and resided in the Chelsea community.

=== 1880s and 1890s ===
By 1881, the wild American bison had been hunted to near-extinction by commercial hunters. By 1883–1884, more than 300 Assiniboine died of starvation while forcibly incarcerated at the Wolf Point sub-agency. Rations were insufficient, and the suffering reservation-wide was exacerbated by particularly severe winters.

In 1884, Wolf Point was suffering from extreme poverty and starvation, so the Indian Rights Association convinced Congress to make a special appropriation for them. In the spring of 1884, residents built a dam to enable irrigation. From 1885 to Montana Statehood in 1889, the tribes participated in agreements with the US government to re-drawing the Fort Peck reservation boundaries in exchange for federal subsidies.

In 1887, Congress passed the Dawes Act, which provided the general legislation for dividing the allegedly tribally-owned Indian reservations into parcels of land under individual titles. Around the start of the 20th century, non-Indians continued to violate the Reservation boundary areas, then encroached into the prime grazing and farmland areas within the Reservation territories. As more and more homesteaders moved into the surrounding areas, pressure was placed on Congress to open up the Fort Peck Reservation to homesteading.

=== 1900s to 1930s ===
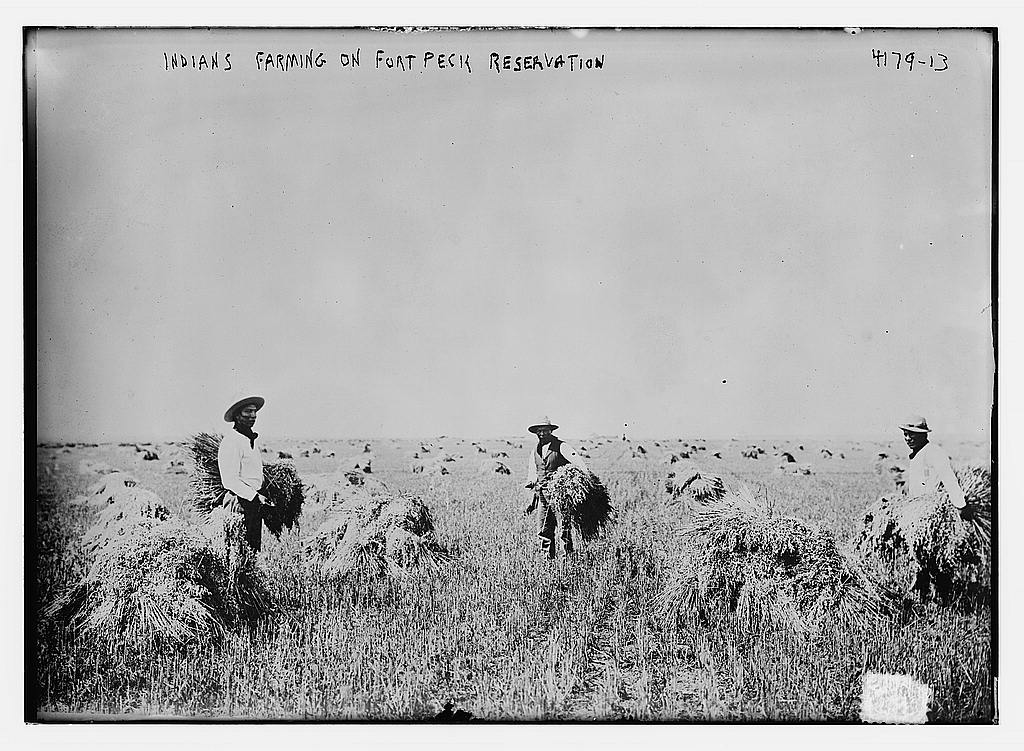
Fort Peck Indian Reservation in 1917 harvesting oats

On May 30, 1908, Fort Peck Allotment Act was passed by Congress. The Act called for the survey and allotment of lands now embraced by the Fort Peck Indian Reservation and the sale and dispersal of all the surplus lands after allotment. Each eligible Indian was to receive 320 acres (1.3 km^{2}; 0.50 sq mi) of grazing land in addition to some timber and irrigable land. Parcels of land were also withheld for Agency, school, and church use. Land was also reserved for use by the Great Northern Railway. All lands not allotted or reserved were declared surplus and were ready to be disposed of under the homestead's general provisions, desert land, mineral, and townsite laws.

In 1913, approximately 1,348,408 acres (5,456.81 km^{2}; 2,106.888 sq mi) of unallotted or tribal unreserved lands were available for settlement by the non-Indian homesteaders. Although provisions were made to sell the remaining land not disposed of in the first five years, it was never completed. Several additional allotments were made before the 1930s.

=== Modern ===
In June 2015, the Department of Interior sent offers to buy back land worth $230 million to nearly 12,000 individual owners at the Fort Peck Indian Reservation and the smaller Fort Belknap Indian Reservation. This was under the Land Buy-Back Program for Tribal Nations, established as part of the federal government's settlement of the landmark Cobell v. Salazar suit over federal mismanagement of revenues due Indian landowners under the trust program.

== Education ==
Educational history on the Reservation includes a government boarding school program that was begun in 1877 and finally discontinued in the 1920s. Missionary schools were run periodically by the Mormons and Presbyterians in the first decades of the 20th century, but with minimal success. The Fort Peck Reservation is served by five public school districts, which are responsible for elementary and secondary education. In addition, an independent post-secondary institution is located on the Reservation: Fort Peck Community College, which offers nine associate of arts, six associate of science, and ten associate of applied science degrees. In recent years, the quality of education delivered to the Reservation's children has become a matter of scrutiny.

For some years, the Fort Peck Indian Reservation was the location of a branch campus of the NAES College.

== Description ==
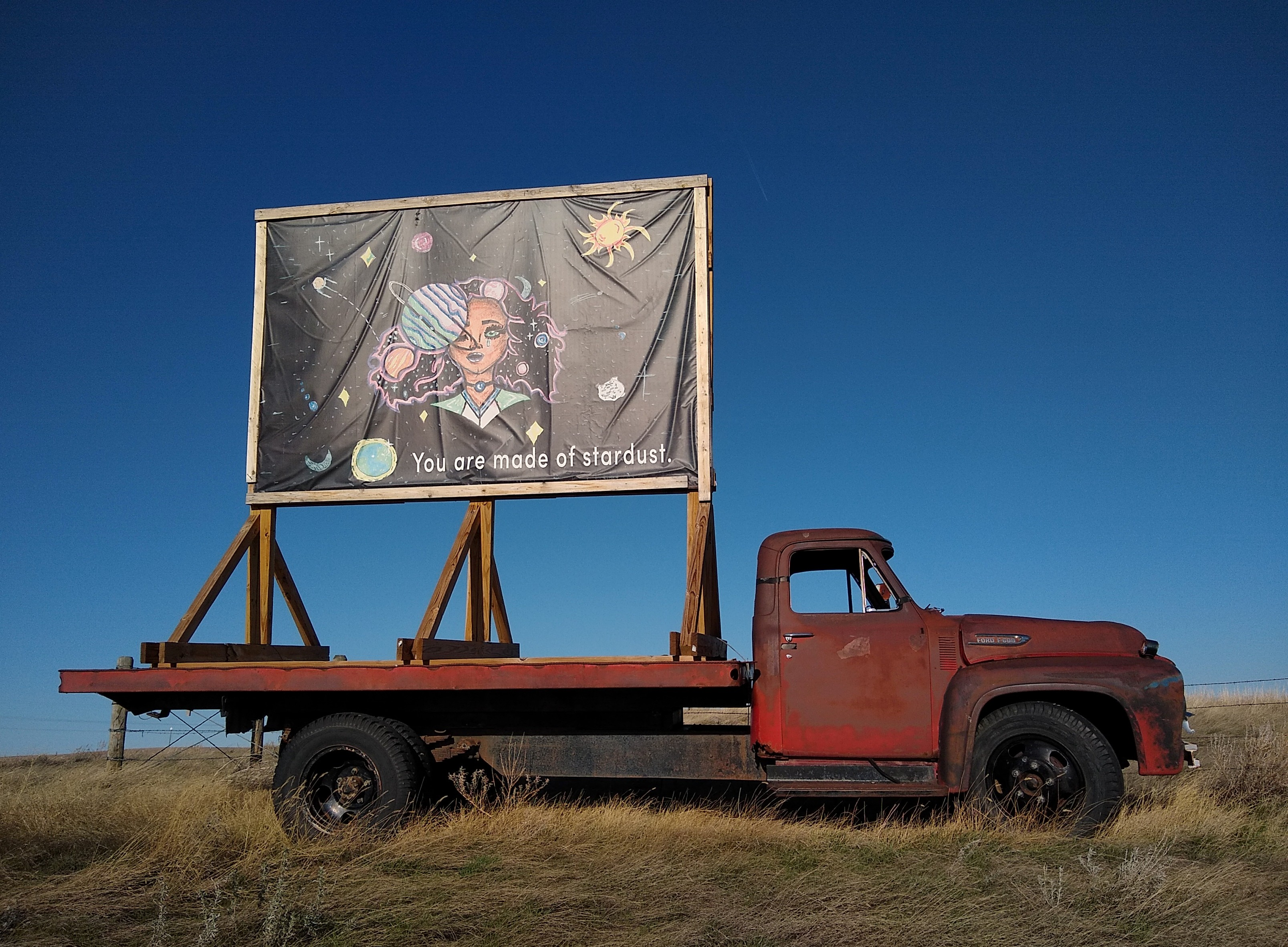
You Are Made of Stardust sign on the Fort Peck Indian Reservation

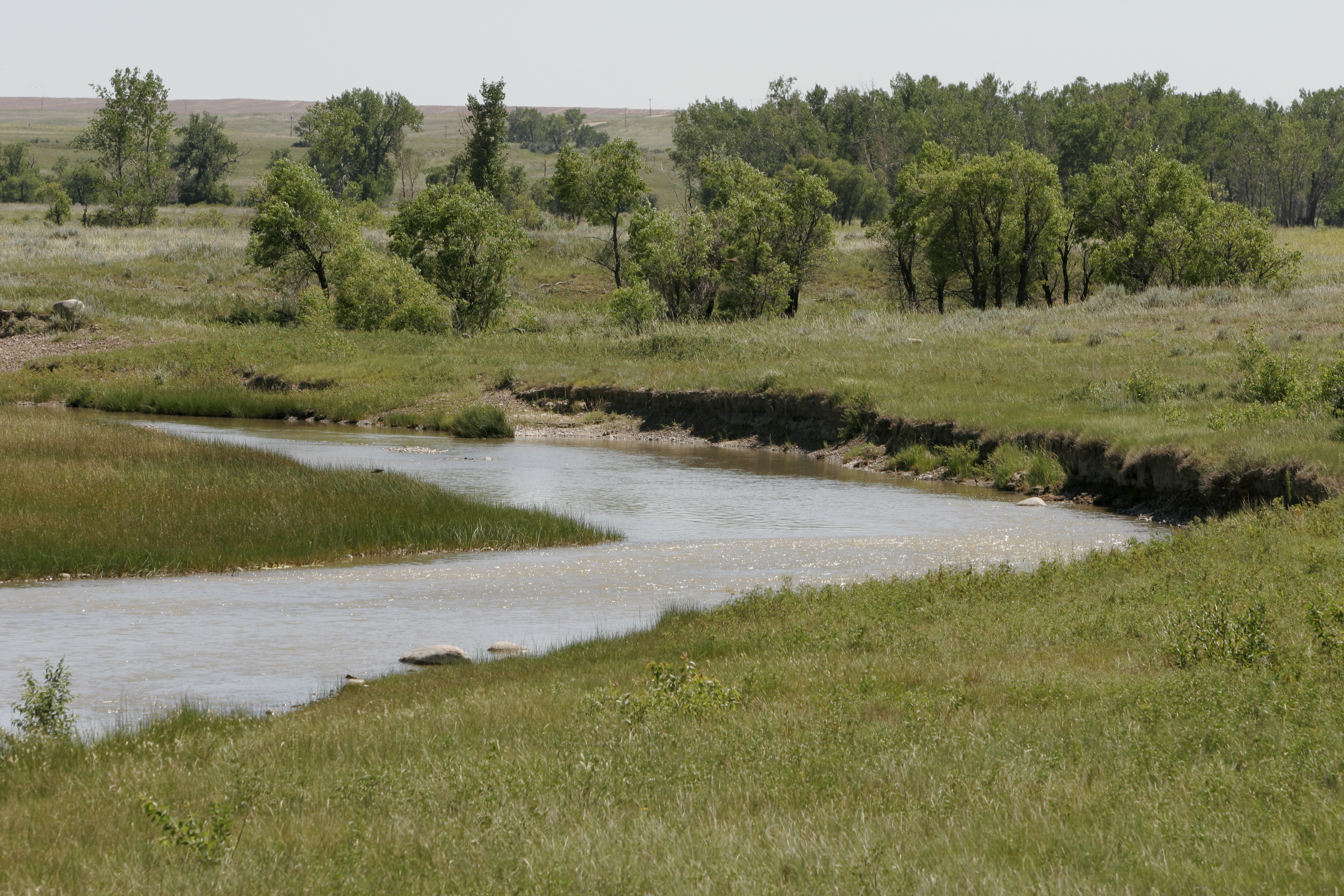
Poplar River running through the Fort Peck Reservation

The reservation is home to The Assiniboine and Sioux Tribes (Assiniboine: įhą́ktuwąna). Though separate, the two tribes speak related Siouan languages. Fort Peck Reservation is home to two separate Indian nations, each composed of numerous bands and divisions. The Sioux divisions of Sisseton/Wahpetons, the Yanktonais, and the Teton Hunkpapa are all represented. The Assiniboine bands of Canoe Paddler and Red Bottom are represented. The Assiniboine refer to themselves as "Nakona" and the Sioux call themselves "Dakota".

As of 2026, the Fort Peck Tribes have an estimated 6,800 living on the reservation and approximately 3,900 members living off the reservation. The tribe uses blood quantum measurements to determine enrollment. The population density is greatest along the southern border of the Reservation near the Missouri River and the major transportation routes, U.S. Highway 2 and the Amtrak routing on the tracks of the Burlington Northern Railroad.

The Reservation is in northeastern Montana, 40 miles (64 km) miles west of the North Dakota border and 50 miles (80 km) miles south of the Canadian border, with the Missouri River defining its southern perimeter. The Reservation is 110 miles (180 km) long and 40 miles (64 km) wide, encompassing 2,093,310 acres (8,471.3 km^{2}; 3,270.80 sq mi). Of this, approximately 378,000 acres (1,530 km^{2}; 591 sq mi) are tribally owned and 548,000 acres (2,220 km^{2}; 856 sq mi) are individually allotted Indian lands. The total of Indian owned lands is about 926,000 acres (3,750 km^{2}; 1,447 sq mi).

Big-game hunting on the reservation is limited to enrolled tribal members only. Upland bird seasons are open to the general public.

== Economy ==
The Fort Peck Tribes is the largest employer on the reservation and in the region with over 350 employees. A large industrial park is in Poplar with enterprises like metal fabrication and production sewing. Farming, ranching and oil extraction also play a part in the reservation economy.

== Government ==
Map of the Fort Peck Indian Reservation and nearby reservations (In yellow).

The Fort Peck Tribes adopted their first written constitution in 1927. The Tribes voted to reject a new constitution under the Indian Reorganization Act in 1934. The original constitution was amended in 1952 by then-Chairman William Knorr. It was completely rewritten and adopted in 1960 by then-Chairman Austin Buckles. The present constitution remains one of the few modern tribal constitutions that still includes provisions for general councils, the traditional tribal type of government.

The official governing body of the Fort Peck Tribes is the Tribal Executive Board, composed of twelve voting members, plus a chairman, vice-chairman, secretary-accountant, and sergeant-at-arms. All members of the governing body, except the secretary-accountant, are elected at large every two years. Floyd Azure became Chairman in 2025. This is his sixth term, though non-consecutive.

The Tribal Government has control over most activities inside of the reservation borders. The Tribe has its own court system, jail, and treatment center. In addition to the Tribal Government, there are also city and county governments, as well as a Sisseton Wahpeton Sioux Council. The Tribal Headquarters are located in Poplar, widely viewed as the capital of the Reservation. The Bureau of Indian Affairs has the Fort Peck Agency located in Poplar.

== Bison ==
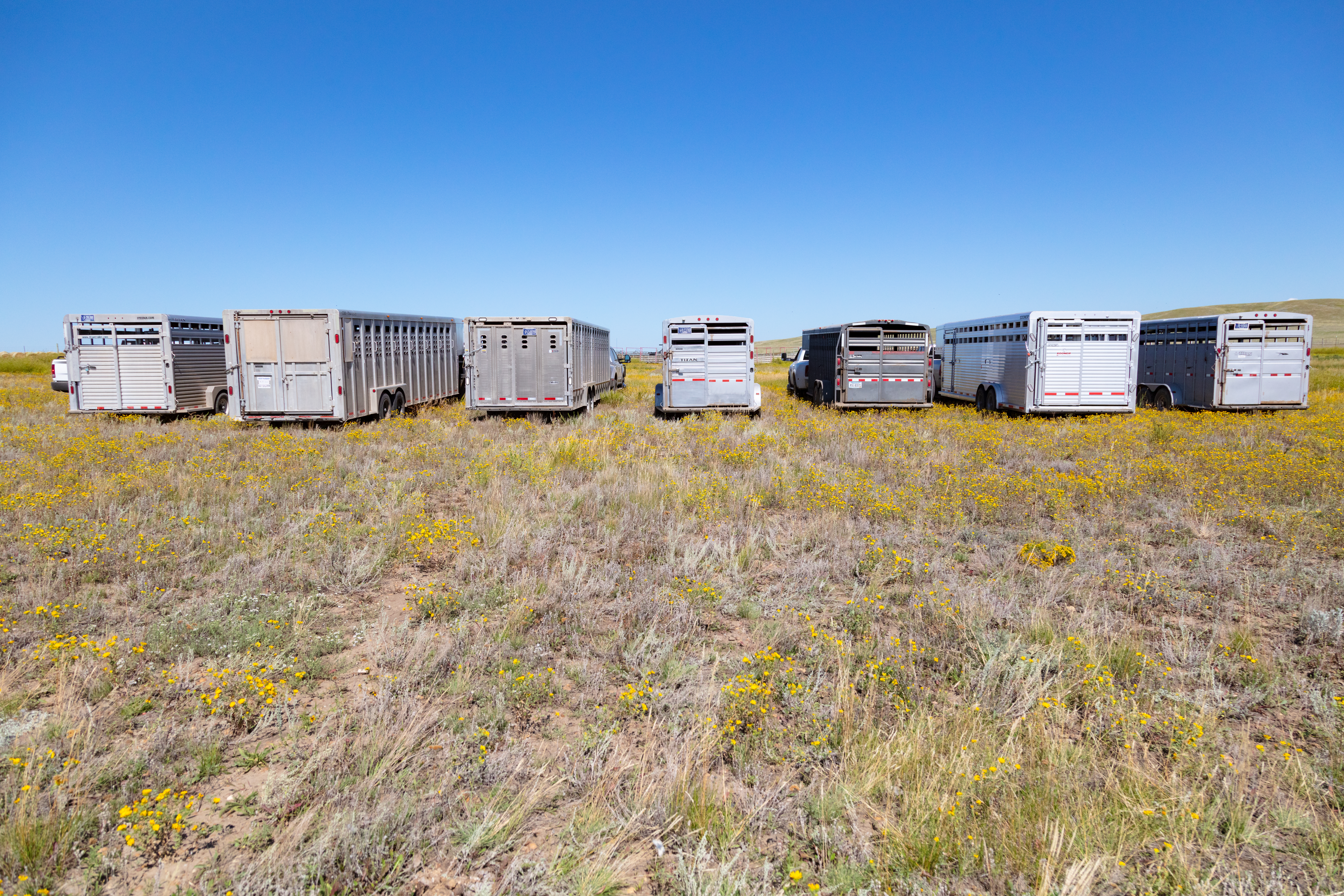
First group of trailers with Yellowstone bison

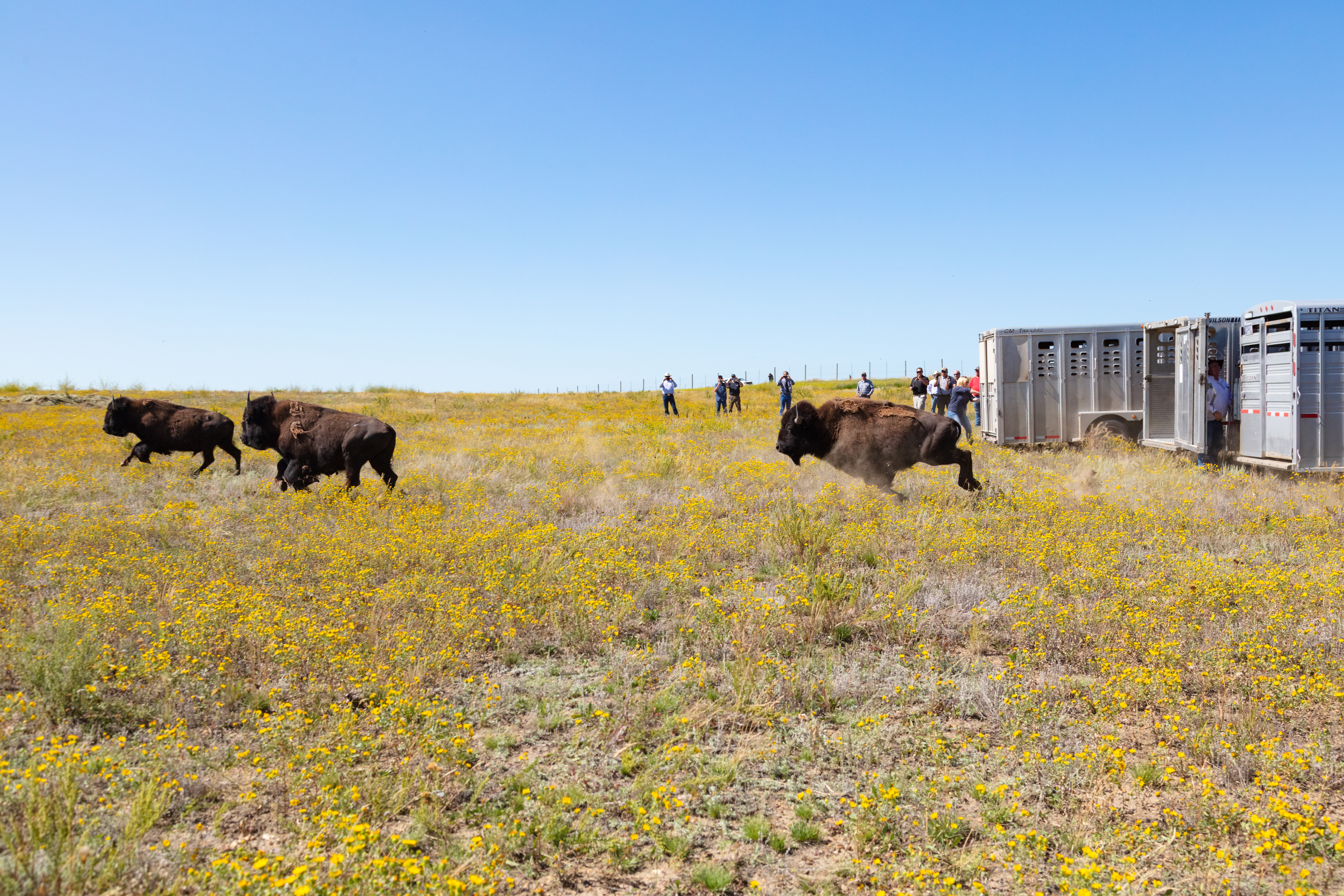
Yellowstone bison being released into Ft. Peck Indian Reservation

In March 2012, 63 American bison from Yellowstone National Park were transferred to the Fort Peck Indian Reservation prairie, to be released to a 2,100-acre (8.5 km^{2}; 3.3 sq mi) game preserve 25 miles (40 km) north of Poplar. There are many other bison herds, but this is one of the very few not cross-bred with cattle. Native Americans celebrated the move, which came over a century after bison were nearly wiped out by hunters and the government. The Assiniboine and Gros Ventre tribes at the Fort Belknap Indian Reservation will also receive a portion of this herd. In September 2014 the tribes of the reservation became one of the original eight signatories to the Buffalo Treaty.

In November 2014, an additional 136 American Bison from Yellowstone National Park were added to the Fort Peck Herd. The preserve has also been enlarged to 13,000 acres (53 km^{2}; 20 sq mi) as Fort Peck Fish and Game works toward their target goal of 1,000 bison, which scientists feel is the minimum herd size necessary to restore the Bison to the role they once had in the environment. The tribe continues to receive Yellowstone bison for quarantine and transfer to other tribes.

== Communities ==
- Brockton
- Frazer
- Lustre
- Poplar
- Reserve
- Wolf Point
- Fort Kipp
- Oswego

== Notable tribal members ==
- Dolly Akers, legislator
- Amber Midthunder, actress
- James Allen Red Dog, murderer
- Chaske Spencer, actor
- Minnie Two Shoes (1950–2010), journalist, activist, co-founder of the Native American Press Association
- Frank W. Warner
- Horse's Ghost
