= Fort Peck Indian Agency =

Agency that's part of the Bureau of Indian Affairs

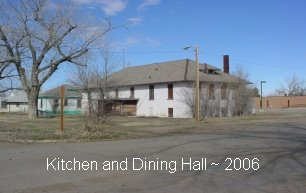
Old Fort Peck Agency building, Poplar, Montana

The Fort Peck Agency of the Bureau of Indian Affairs is responsible for the Fort Peck Indian Reservation is located near Wolf Point, Montana.

== History ==
The agency is responsible for 12,000 Assiniboine and Sioux enrolled tribal members and the reservation contains about 2,094,000 acres of land within its exterior boundary. There are about 939,165 acres of tribal and allotted surface trust acreage that includes Turtle Mountain Public Domain lands.

=== Agents ===
- On September 1, 1882, N. S. Porter (Fort Peck Indian Agent) submitted his fourth annual report to the Commissioner of Indian Affairs.
- On August 10, 1883, George W. Wilkinson (U.S. Indian Agent for Fort Peck) submitted his first annual report to the Commissioner of Indian Affairs.

== Superintendents ==
- Charles B. Lohmiller 1904 to 1917
