= Dolly Akers =

American politician (1901–1986)

- Born: Dolly Smith; March 23, 1901; Wolf Point, Montana, U.S.
- Died: June 5, 1986 (aged 85); Helena, Montana, U.S.
- Other name: Dolly Smith Cusker Akers
- Citizenship: Assiniboine and Sioux Tribes of the Fort Peck Indian Reservation, United States
- Occupations: Politician, interpreter
- Political party: Democratic, later Republican
- Spouse(s): George Cusker (m. 1917–1941; his death); John Akers (m. 1944–1959; his death)
- Children: 1

Dolly Akers (née Dolly Smith; March 23, 1901 – June 5, 1986) was an Assiniboine woman who was the first Native American woman elected to the Montana Legislature with 100% of the Indian vote and the first woman elected to the Tribal Executive Board of the Assiniboine and Sioux Tribes of the Fort Peck Indian Reservation.

== Childhood and personal life ==
Dolly Smith Cusker Akers was born in Wolf Point, Montana. Her mother, Nellie Trexler, was a citizen of the Assiniboine Tribe and her father, William Smith, was an Irish-American. She grew up in the Northeast of Montana on Fort Peck Reservation. As a teenager, she attended a Native American boarding school called the Sherman Institute in Riverside, California.

After she graduated at age 16, she returned to Montana and married George Cusker in 1917. The couple ranched near Poplar and had one daughter named Alvina. George Cusker died in 1941 and in 1944, Dolly remarried to John Akers. She was widowed a second time in 1959.

== Political career ==
In 1920, Akers moved to Washington, D.C., to work as an interpreter for leaders of her tribe in their dealings with the federal government. In 1923, Cusker accompanied two tribal representatives, Bear Hill and Dave Johnson, to Washington, D.C., as a translator to lobby for school funding. While there, she also advocated that Native peoples be given universal citizenship in America. The Indian Citizenship Act was passed in 1924, which granted citizenship to all Native Americans. Not all Natives supported the passage of this act because it provided voting rights for Native Americans, which they feared was yet another step toward assimilation and that it undermined tribal sovereignty.

Dolly was appointed to the Tribal Council Executive Board in her own right after attending the board meetings in the stead of her first husband, George Cusker, who served on the board. She was the first woman to earn this designation.

In 1932, Dolly was elected to the statehouse as a Democrat but later became a Republican. She received almost 100 percent of the vote in Roosevelt County, which was a county that consisted mostly of white Americans. She became the first American Indian to serve in the Montana legislature, elected at just 23 years old, and was the only woman serving in the 1933–34 legislative session. She was appointed to the Federal Relations Committee and was a special representative of the governor to the U.S. Secretary of Interior.

Dolly remained politically engaged for her entire life. She visited Washington, D.C., 57 times as a tribal delegate and was a citizen of the Fort Peck Tribal Council off and on for 40 years. Her career was not without controversy. For example, in 1959, she was removed from the tribal council by a vote of 279 to 189 and "barred forever from holding office and representing the Fort Peck Sioux and Assiniboine tribes." That vote was later overturned.

Dolly frequently challenged the Indian Bureau's management of tribal resources, believing that tribes (and individual Indians) should be permitted to manage their own affairs just as non-Natives could. "Why should Indian people," she asked in 1952, "be forced to live under a law made some 80 years ago? That is the year in which the Indian Commissioner referred to Indians as 'wild beasts!'"

== Housing authority and advocacy ==
After being elected to the Fort Peck Tribal Housing Authority in the 1970s, she advocated for funding for housing on the Fort Peck Reservation. She achieved her goal of receiving federal funds but was later accused by some members of the tribal council of favoring her supporters instead of weighing all applicants equally in the allocation of those housing funds. Dolly lived on a 1,400-acre ranch in Montana for part of her life where she served as an advocate and special advocate for seven different reservations in the state. Dolly does a lot of work on awareness of the problems faced on reservations, especially regarding the youth, as she worked as a social worker for these seven reservations. Dolly personally sees these problems as a result of the up-bringing of native youths, as more and more parents are not teaching their children their heritage and native language to pass on.

Her belief in Indian autonomy led her to support the controversial policy of Termination, which advocated "terminating" the U.S. government's treaty obligations to tribes in order to encourage individual Indians to integrate into the larger Euro-American society. Looking back on her career, she was most proud of successfully lobbying for a regulation permitting tribes to hire their own legal counsel and the 1968 Indian Civil Rights Act, which placed Native Americans under the constitution.

Dolly was also appointed to the Montana FHA advisory committee.

== Death ==
After an impactful life, she died in 1986 in Helena.

== See also ==
- List of Native American politicians
- Native American women in politics
