= Barry Beach =

American murderer (born 1962)

Barry Allan Beach
- Born: February 15, 1962 (age 64)

Barry Allan Beach (born February 15, 1962) is an American who was sentenced to 100 years in prison without parole in 1984 for the 1979 murder of Kimberly Nees in Poplar, Montana. During the years following his conviction, Beach gained support from influential state and national advocates who said his murder confession, the linchpin of his conviction, was coerced. In 2015, his sentence was commuted to time served, plus ten years on probation.

His case was partly responsible for the development of Montana House Bill 43, passed on January 23, 2015, which grants the Governor of Montana the right to approve clemency for convicts without approval from the Montana Board of Pardons and Parole.

== Murder of Kimberly Nees ==
In the early morning of June 16, 1979, 17-year-old Kimberly Nees was brutally murdered outside Poplar, Montana. Later that morning, police found her family's pickup truck at a well-known party spot half a mile outside of town. They followed a trail of blood from the truck to the Poplar River, where they found Nees’ body. An autopsy revealed she had suffered 20 or 21 blows to the skull. There was no indication that a robbery or sexual assault had taken place. Nees’ sweater was found folded neatly near the back of the truck with her purse and a pack of cigarettes placed on top.

More than two dozen fingerprints were found on the vehicle, as were multiple footprints in and around the trail. A bloody palm print was found on the passenger door. An FBI investigation later determined that the palm print must have been left by the killer.

Nees was the graduating valedictorian from Poplar High School that year and was described as pretty and popular. Residents of Poplar rumored that the murder was a "jealousy killing" and that three or four peers in town were involved in her death.

Beach, then 17, was Nees’ neighbor and had previously dated Nees’ sister. Beach was one of the people questioned by police for the murder but no charges were filed against him at the time.

== Confession and trial ==
After the murder, Beach moved to Louisiana to live with his father. In 1983, Beach's stepmother called the police, claiming Beach had helped his stepsister skip school. Police in Monroe, Louisiana, arrested Beach for contributing to the delinquency of a minor. Police discovered that Beach had been questioned for Nees’ murder and interrogated him about the local murder of three women. Initially, Beach denied involvement in Nees’ murder, but after two days of questioning, he confessed to murdering Nees and the three Louisiana women. He was later cleared of the Louisiana murders because he was not in the state at the time of the crimes. According to the group Montanans for Justice, all three of the Louisiana homicides were later determined to have been committed by others.

Beach was charged with first-degree murder. He pleaded not guilty during his trial in 1984 in Glasgow, Montana, arguing that his confession was coerced. During the case, the prosecutor, Marc Racicot, argued that the detailed confession that Beach provided was one that only the killer could have made.

Poplar's police chief revealed a police officer broke into a sealed room where evidence from Nees crime scene was stored that the night after the murder. The police officer was the father of one of the original suspects who was not charged. Because of his entrance, the evidence stored inside, including a strand of pubic hair recovered from the crime scene, was inadmissible in court. However, prosecutor Marc Racicot told the jury that a pubic hair had been found on Nees’ sweater and was "in fact, the defendant’s." Racicot reiterated this mistruth during his closing statements.

Crime lab scientist Arnold Melnikoff had claimed that the hair had "similar characteristics" to Beach's hair. At a subsequent job, Melnikoff was found incompetent and fired by the State of Washington for his inability to analyze hair. Melnikoff had testified against at least two other men in the state of Montana who were wrongly convicted of murders of which they were later exonerated.

Evidence from the crime scene that did not implicate Beach in the murder was minimized at trial. Racicot claimed that footprints found at the scene, which did not match Beach's, could have been left by police, even though the prints indicated bare feet and sandals. He also said that the bloody palm print found on the truck might have belonged to Nees to explain why the print did not belong to Beach. However, multiple police reports concluded that the print belonged to neither Nees nor Beach.

The tape of Beach's confession had been erased and thus could not be heard during Beach's trial. A transcript of the confession was read instead. Beach maintains that his confession was coerced.

Six hours after the case was submitted to the jury, the jury returned a guilty verdict. Beach was sentenced to 100 years without parole. Pam Nees, Nees’ sister, later said, "I just couldn't believe that he would do that, or that he would even be around her."

== Questions regarding interrogation and confession ==
Beach's confession, the only piece of evidence tying Beach to the crime, has been questioned for its inaccuracies. At trial, Racicot's argument placed a high level of significance on Beach's knowledge of what Nees was wearing the night of her murder. Beach said Nees was wearing a brown sports jacket and plaid blouse. In fact, she was wearing a white sweater and blue and red blazer. A transcript of a call that took place before Beach's confession between Montana's sheriff and Via cast more doubt on Beach's confession. The transcript suggested Via believed Nees was wearing a brown plaid shirt, very similar to the inaccuracy that appeared in Beach's confession. The detective denied any wrongdoing, but some believe that Beach was fed details of the murder to make his confession more convincing.

Beach confessed to putting Nees’ body in a garbage bag feet first and then dragging her body to the river by her shoulders. However, evidence showed that Nees’ body had been dragged by her feet. Also, police had found no shred of a garbage bag on the rocky path leading to the river from the truck. Beach's confession also indicated that he threw the murder weapons and keys to the truck into the Poplar River; however, the river was searched by divers on several occasions and none of these items were found in or near the river.

Crime scene reports indicated that the truck at the scene of the crime was parked 257 feet (78.3 m) away from the Poplar River, but Beach reported that Kim's truck was parked right by the river. Beach also said that he wasn't sure if Kim was bleeding after the attack, but the crime scene indicated considerable bleeding, both inside and out of the truck.

In his confession, Beach alleged that he choked Nees, but an autopsy found no indication of strangulation. Beach also claimed that after the murder, he wiped his fingerprints from the truck, but many fingerprints, four palm prints and one bloody palm print were found on the truck, none of which belonged to Nees or Beach. Finally, Beach said that Nees tried to escape from the driver's side door, but the bloody palm print was on the passenger's side.

The lead detective who interrogated Beach in Louisiana, John "Jay" Via, was accused of misconduct in many cases over many years. According to Via's personnel file, he was suspended without pay on at least four occasions, placed on one-year probation, twice threatened with the possibility of termination, and ordered to undergo a neurological examination to ascertain whether there was anything "organically or physically wrong with his ability to think and remember". Via was also accused of soliciting a false testimony in another murder case.

According to Beach, Commander Alfred Calhoun, who was one of the detectives that interrogated Beach, promised him he would personally see him fry in an electric chair. Beach also claims that during the interrogation, he was asked to speculate how the murder might have taken place and was asked to give a hypothetical narrative as if he were the murderer. Beach claimed that he gave the confession because he had been instructed to do so and was told that he could prove his innocence later when he was transported back to Montana.

== Centurion Ministries’ involvement ==
Beach requested help from Centurion Ministries, who agreed to research his case after their investigators reviewed the facts of the case and noticed an absence of physical evidence that tied Beach to the murder, despite the abundance of evidence collected at the crime scene. Centurion Ministries formally took on the case in 2000. They conducted an exhaustive reinvestigation of Beach's conviction.

Centurion's investigators uncovered evidence, including testimonies from people who said that a group of girls confessed to killing Nees. One of these girls was Dottie Sue "Sissy" Atkinson. Witnesses, including her own brother, said Atkinson implicated herself in the murder. Atkinson was allegedly jealous because Nees had a romantic relationship with Alex Trottier, the father of Atkinson's daughter. However, none of the fingerprints or the palm print belonged to Atkinson.

Centurion Ministries also brought a motion to conduct DNA testing on the evidence, which a judge granted in 2005. However, the state said it could not locate the evidence collected from the crime scene, including the pubic hair, a bloody towel, hairs contained in more than 100 slides, cigarette butts or Nees’ jacket. Therefore, DNA testing could not be conducted.

In August 2006, Centurion Ministries submitted an application for clemency on Beach's behalf to the office of then-governor Brian Schweitzer. Centurion Ministries used the analysis of Professor Richard Leo, an expert in false confessions, to support Beach. Leo stated, "[false confessions are] one of the leading causes of wrongful conviction" and concluded that Beach's confession lacked specifics that, as police claimed, "only the killer could have known".

The Montana Board of Pardons and Parole rejected the application on August 23, 2007, stating that "no proof of innocence, or newly discovered evidence of nonguilt" was presented. "It is apparent to us that it would have been impossible to create so detailed and so correct a false confession in any event: but the validity of that observation is underscored brightly by the facts that Mr. Beach knew and explained much which the officers had not been able to piece together," the board said.

== 2011 trial and release ==
A Dateline special on the case aired April 4, 2008, and prompted more support for Beach. On November 24, 2009, the Montana Supreme Court ordered an evidentiary hearing for the case, to determine "whether a jury, acting reasonably, would have voted to find Beach guilty beyond a reasonable doubt".

Centurion Ministries made a motion asking for a new judge to hear a new appeal of Beach's conviction, which the Supreme Court of Montana approved, appointing Fergus County District Judge E. Wayne Phillips to the case. In August 2011, Beach appeared before court for the retrial. During his first appearance in court, he was met with applause.

Beach's lawyers called new witnesses that had come forward after the airing of Dateline's special. Steffie Eagleboy, then 10 years old, testified before court that she witnessed the murder. She said she then saw a patrol car pull up to the scene of the crime after the murder. According to Eagleboy, a police officer exited the vehicle to assess the scene before leaving. Because she had seen a cop at the scene already, she said she saw no point in going to the police about what she had witnessed.

Other witnesses alleged that Atkinson and Joann Jackson, another former suspect of the crime, had told them about how they committed the crime.

The State of Montana contended that the new witnesses were not credible. Montana Attorney General also claimed that none of the evidence exonerated Beach or suggested multiple attackers were involved.

In November 2011, Judge Phillips issued a ruling that there was clear and convincing evidence that a jury could find Beach innocent in the case and granted Beach a new trial. Beach was released from prison to the custody of Billings businessman James "Ziggy" Ziegler, who had met Beach through prison prayer service. Hours after the ruling, after nearly three decades behind bars, Beach was free on his own recognizance, pending a new trial.

In Billings, Beach started his own maintenance company and then became the head of maintenance at a hotel. Beach also traveled throughout Montana giving speeches on hope.

== Re-incarceration ==
On May 14, 2013, the Montana Supreme Court reinstated Beach's murder conviction in a 4-3 decision. Supreme Court Justice Jim Rice wrote, "Beach's new evidence – in the form of testimony that is primarily hearsay, internally inconsistent, and inconsistent with evidence presented at Beach's 1984 trial – does not reliably displace the evidence tested at Beach’s trial, including his confession". Beach thus was not granted a new trial and was ordered to resume his life sentence immediately. The same day, he told the press, "It was hard enough to be innocent to begin with, but to be going back, still innocent, for the second time, is just unbelievable." A few hours later, he surrendered himself to the authorities.

== 2014 attempt for clemency ==
In April 2014, Beach's attorney Peter Camiel sent an application for commutation to Montana's Board of Pardons and Parole requesting that Beach be considered for parole. Camiel argued that the circumstances of the case had changed since the board rejected his earlier request for clemency. At the time of application, the Governor of Montana could only decide whether a prisoner's sentence could be commuted in non-death-penalty cases if the Board of Pardons and Parole recommends commutation. Earlier that year, Governor Steve Bullock had sent a letter to the board supporting commutation of Beach's sentence and indicated that he would free Beach if the Board voted to move ahead with the clemency application.

Over two hundred Montanans, including U.S. Senator John Tester, former U.S. Senator Conrad Burns, former Montana Governor Brian Schweitzer and Billings Mayor Tom Hanel wrote letters to the Board supporting Beach's petition for clemency.

On June 12, 2014, Montana's Board of Pardons and Paroles again rejected Beach's application for clemency.

== 2015 hearing ==
In October 2014, Beach's attorneys asked Montana's Supreme Court to order that Beach be resentenced. The Supreme Court asked the State to respond to his attorneys' claim that Beach's 100-year sentence is illegal because the trial court did not consider that Beach was a minor at the time of Nees’ killing and because it leaves no opportunity for release.

On May 5, 2015, the court denied Beach's petition for writ of habeas corpus ruling that the rule in Miller v. Alabama, prohibiting mandatory life sentences for juveniles, did not apply to Beach because his sentence was not mandatory under Montana's then sentencing scheme, which required individualized consideration. The court also ruled that the rule in Miller that a court must follow a certain process before imposing a life without parole sentence on a juvenile was a new rule and was not substantive and therefore could not be applied retroactively.

== House Bill 43 ==
On January 23, 2015, the Montana House approved House Bill 43 on an 86-to-14 vote. The bill, which grew out of Beach's case, says the governor can consider any clemency application regardless of the board's recommendation. It also says the governor can order the board to have a hearing on a clemency request if the board denies a hearing. This has paved a new path for Beach to seek clemency.

Billings Democrat Margie Macdonald who supported House Bill 43's passage said, "Montana is only one of only eight states where the board has so much power, and can prevent the governor from addressing a case should he or she feel it has merit."

== Commutation ==
Beach's sentence was reduced by Montana Governor Steve Bullock on November 20, 2015. The sentence was commuted to time served plus an additional ten years on probation.
