= KGLT =

- Bozeman, Montana; United States
- Frequency: 91.9 MHz

Programming
- Format: Variety

Ownership
- Owner: Montana State University - Bozeman; (Board of Regents - Montana University System)

History
- First air date: 1968

Technical information
- Licensing authority: FCC
- Facility ID: 6085
- Class: C2
- ERP: 12,000 watts
- HAAT: 261 meters (857 feet)
- Transmitter coordinates: 45°57′25″N 111°22′11″W

Links
- Public license information: Public file; LMS
- Webcast: Listen Live
- Website: http://www.kglt.net/

KGLT (91.9 FM) is a radio station licensed to serve Bozeman, Montana. The station is owned by Montana State University - Bozeman and licensed to the Board of Regents - Montana University System. It airs a Variety format.

The station was assigned the KGLT call letters by the Federal Communications Commission. and broadcasts from Bozeman, and across southwestern Montana, including translators in Helena, Montana and Livingston, Montana.

The station is staffed almost entirely by volunteers, both MSU students and members of the local community. The station hires a director and has a few paid work-study positions. Individuals wishing to become disc jockeys are required to complete an apprenticeship program before going on the air, after which time, they may apply for an on-air shift each semester or participate on the news crew, serve as producers, or provide talent for in-house weekly programming.

KGLT is known for airing a significant amount of non-mainstream programming and a wide variety of music in a "format-free" environment. Prior to the arrival of a National Public Radio affiliate in Bozeman, the station carried several public broadcasting programs, though it has never been formally affiliated with NPR. The station continues to air a small amount of nationally syndicated public radio programming from NPR and Public Radio International, such as This American Life, Mountain Stage, and New Dimensions Radio.

The nationally aired 2-minute radio interlude, "Chrysti the Wordsmith," now supported and aired nationally by the Corporation for Public Broadcasting, originated at KGLT. Creator Chrysti "the Wordsmith" Smith still produces the program at KGLT studios, and expanded her program into book format as the author of Verbivore's Feast: A Banquet of Word & Phrase Origins and Verbivore's Feast: Second Course: More Word & Phrase Origins

== Translators ==
Call sign	Frequency	City of license	FID	ERP (W)	Class	FCC info
K208BX	(89.5 FM) FM	Livingston, MT	4288	64	D	LMS
K220KD	(91.9 FM) FM	Big Sky, MT	153084	10	D	LMS
K246BA	(97.1 FM) FM	Bozeman, MT	150144	28	D	LMS
K251AC	(98.1 FM) FM	Helena, MT	6090	50	D	LMS
K296EF	(107.1 FM) FM	Mammoth Hot Springs, WY	39755	79	D	LMS

== See also ==
- Campus radio
- List of college radio stations in the United States
- List of community radio stations in the United States
