= Fort Peck Original Houses Historic District =

Historic district in Montana, United States

- U.S. National Register of Historic Places
- U.S. Historic district
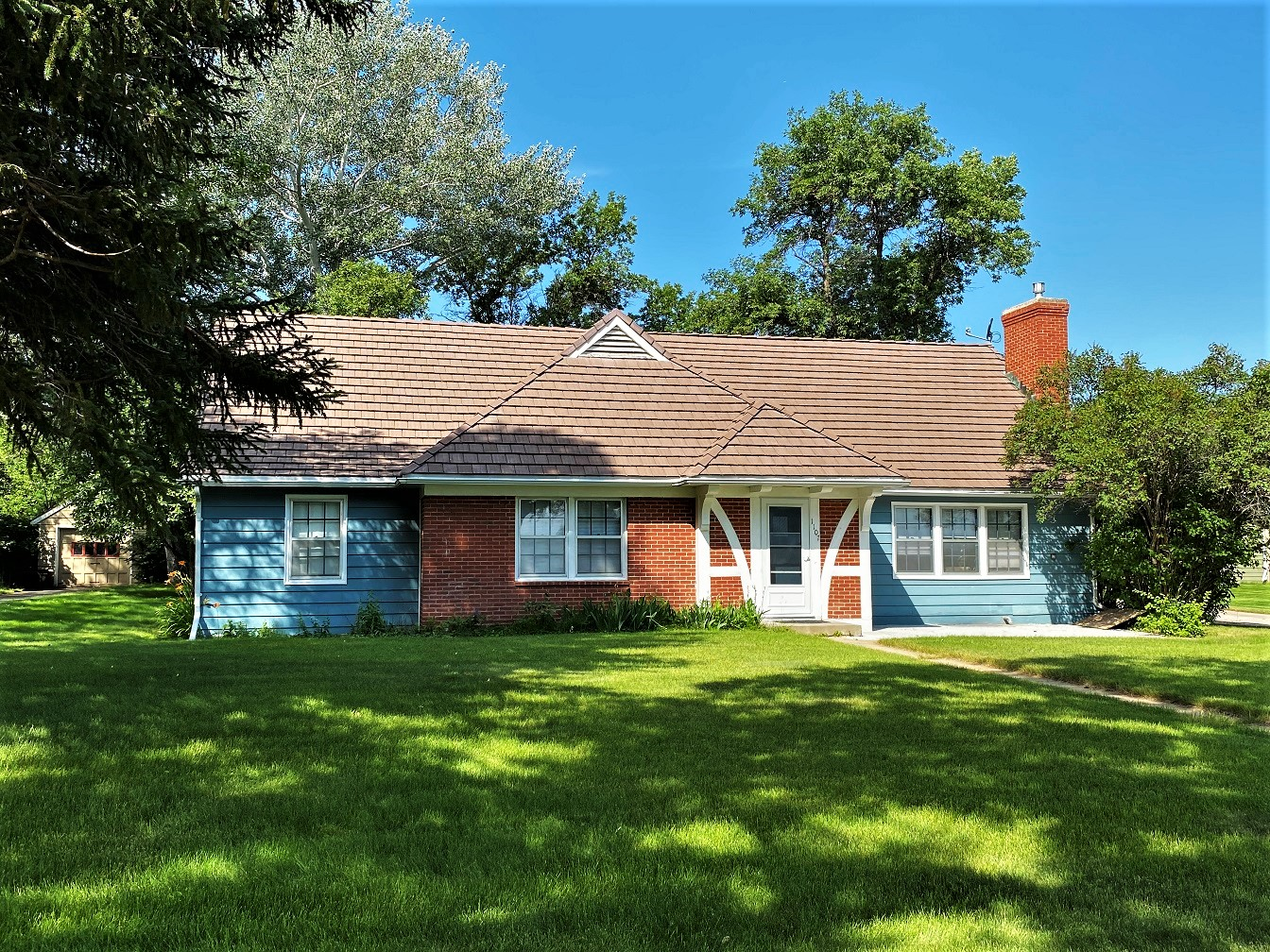

- Location within Montana Location within the United States
- Location: 1101-1112 E. Kansas Ave., Fort Peck, Montana
- Coordinates: 48.011111°N 106.446389°W
- Area: 11 acres (4.5 ha)
- Built: 1934
- Built by: Johnson, Drake & Piper; Madsen Construction Co.
- Architectural style: Cottage picturesque
- MPS: Fort Peck MRA
- NRHP reference No.: 86002067
- Added to NRHP: August 13, 1986

The Fort Peck Original Houses Historic District, is an 11 acres (4.5 ha) historic district consisting of 12 one-story cottages along E. Kansas Avenue in Fort Peck, Montana. Some or all was built in 1934, and they served as housing for the administrative personnel from the Army Corps of Engineers during the Fort Peck Dam project. The district was listed on the National Register of Historic Places in 1986, when all the houses were more than 50 years old.

Ten of the cottages were built by Johnson, Drake, & Piper and two were built by Madsen Const. Co.
