= Charles B. Lohmiller =

Major Charles B. Lohmiller (c. 1867 – 21 June 1932) was also known as Hum-Pa-Zee (which is Sioux for "Yellow Shoes").

== Biography ==
He served as a Major at the Fort Peck Indian Agency, which oversaw the Fort Peck Indian Reservation in Montana, from 1893 to 1917, and was Superintendent of the Agency from 1904 to 1917.
