= Chrysti the Wordsmith =

Etymologically focused radio show

- Running time: 2 minutes
- Country of origin: United States
- Language: English
- Home station: KGLT
- Hosted by: Chrysti “the Wordsmith” Smith
- Original release: 1990
- Website: wordsmithradio.org

Chrysti the Wordsmith is a radio program about word origins and meanings, produced at KGLT in Bozeman, Montana. The two-minute show is written and narrated by Chrysti M. Smith, who is also known as Chrysti the Wordsmith.

== Radio program ==
The program began in 1990 and about 3,000 episodes have been recorded. It airs five days per week on some stations. It is carried by KGLT, Yellowstone Public Radio, as well as on the Armed Forces Network. T

Words covered include those with origins in antiquity such as titanium, and modern words, such as squeaky clean and chillax.

Philip Gaines, English professor at Montana State University, is the script editor for the program.

== Chrysti M. Smith ==
Smith was born on October 27, 1956, to Carol Gorton Smith and Edward "Bud" Smith. She was raised on a farm in northeastern Montana, near Poplar. After graduation from high school in 1974, she lived in North Carolina, Louisiana and Texas for a decade before returning to Montana to attend Montana State University. Smith initiated the radio series Chrysti the Wordsmith as an undergraduate at MSU. In 1995, she graduated with a Bachelor of Science degree in Sociology/Anthropology. Smith is a professional narrator working in television, documentary film, public service announcements, and radio advertisements.

She has published two books:

- Verbivore’s Feast: A Banquet of Word and Phrase Origins from Chrysti the Wordsmith. 2003, Farcountry Press
- Verbivore's Feast, Second Course, More Word & Phrase Origins from Chrysti the Wordsmith. 2006, Farcountry Press
