= Poplar Municipal Airport =

Airport in Montana, United States

- IATA: none; ICAO: none; FAA LID: PO1

Summary
- Airport type: Public
- Owner: Town of Poplar
- Serves: Poplar, Montana
- Elevation AMSL: 2,037 ft (621 m)
- Coordinates: 48°08′04″N 105°09′44″W

Map
- Location of airport in Montana

Runways
| Direction | Length | | Surface |
| Direction | ft | m | Surface |
|---|---|---|---|
| 9/27 | 4,403 | 1,342 | Asphalt |
| 2/20 | 3,020 | 920 | Turf |

Statistics (2012)
- Aircraft operations: 11,400
- Based aircraft: 7
- Source: Federal Aviation Administration

Poplar Municipal Airport (FAA LID: PO1) is a public use airport located two nautical miles (4 km) northeast of the central business district of Poplar, a town in Roosevelt County, Montana, United States. The airport is owned by Town of Poplar. It is included in the National Plan of Integrated Airport Systems for 2011–2015, which categorized it as a general aviation facility.

== Facilities and aircraft ==
Poplar Municipal Airport covers an area of 356 acres (144 ha) at an elevation of 2,037 feet (621 m) above mean sea level. It has two runways: 9/27 is 4,403 by 75 feet (1,342 x 23 m) with an asphalt surface and 2/20 is 3,020 by 80 feet (920 x 24 m) with a turf surface.

For the 12-month period ending July 18, 2012, the airport had 11,400 aircraft operations, an average of 31 per day: 92% general aviation and 8% air taxi. At that time there were 7 aircraft based at this airport: 86% single-engine and 14% multi-engine.

== See also ==
- Poplar Airport (FAA: 42S), the town's former airport, located at 48°06′57″N 105°10′56″W
- List of airports in Montana
