= Charles C. Sargent House =

Historic house in Montana, United States

- U.S. National Register of Historic Places
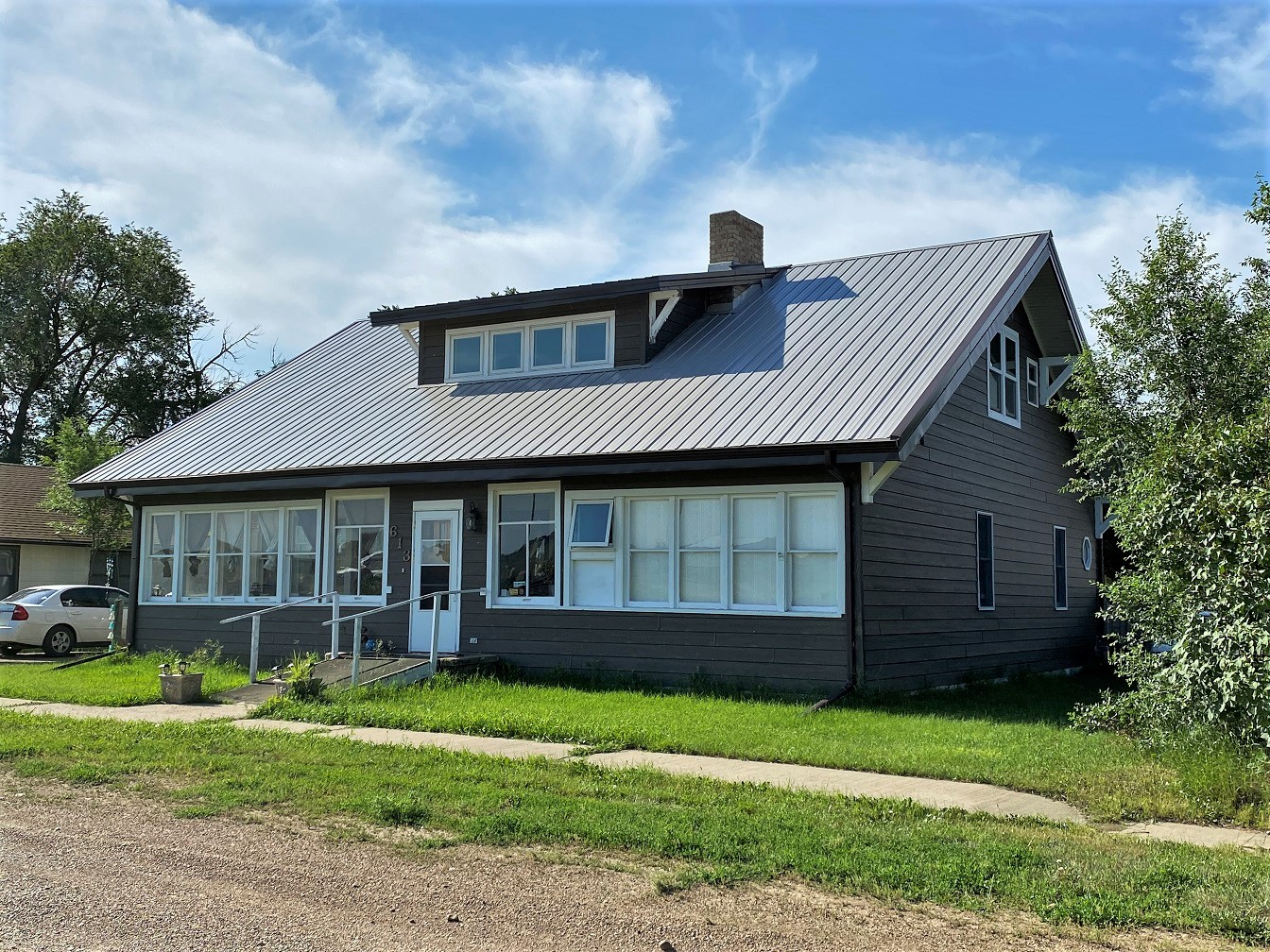

- Location within Montana Location within the United States
- Location: 615 Front St. Nashua, Montana
- Coordinates: 48°7′56″N 106°21′17″W
- Area: 0.3 acres (0.12 ha)
- Built: 1917
- Architectural style: Bungalow/craftsman
- NRHP reference No.: 82003180
- Added to NRHP: July 8, 1982

The Charles C. Sargent House in Nashua, Montana was built in 1917. It was listed on the National Register of Historic Places in 1982.

It is an Arts and Crafts-style home which is significant for association with Charles C. Sargent, the first settler of Nashua. Sargent was a scout for General George Custer who "narrowly missed being with Custer's troops at the Battle of Little Big Horn. A trader and merchant, he was serving as an Indian agent near Poplar, Montana, when the Great Northern Railway was being constructed through eastern Montana. Hearing that there would be a division point at the place which later became Nashua, Sargent moved his family there in 1886 and built the first house on the bank of Porcupine Creek. He started a school, a bank, helped in the formation of School District 13 in Valley County, and established a post office and store in 1888." His original log cabin and the public buildings associated with him have not survived, but this house was built by him in 1917, before the town was incorporated in 1918, and was one of Nashua's "first real homes".
