= Maurice R. Montgomery =

American author

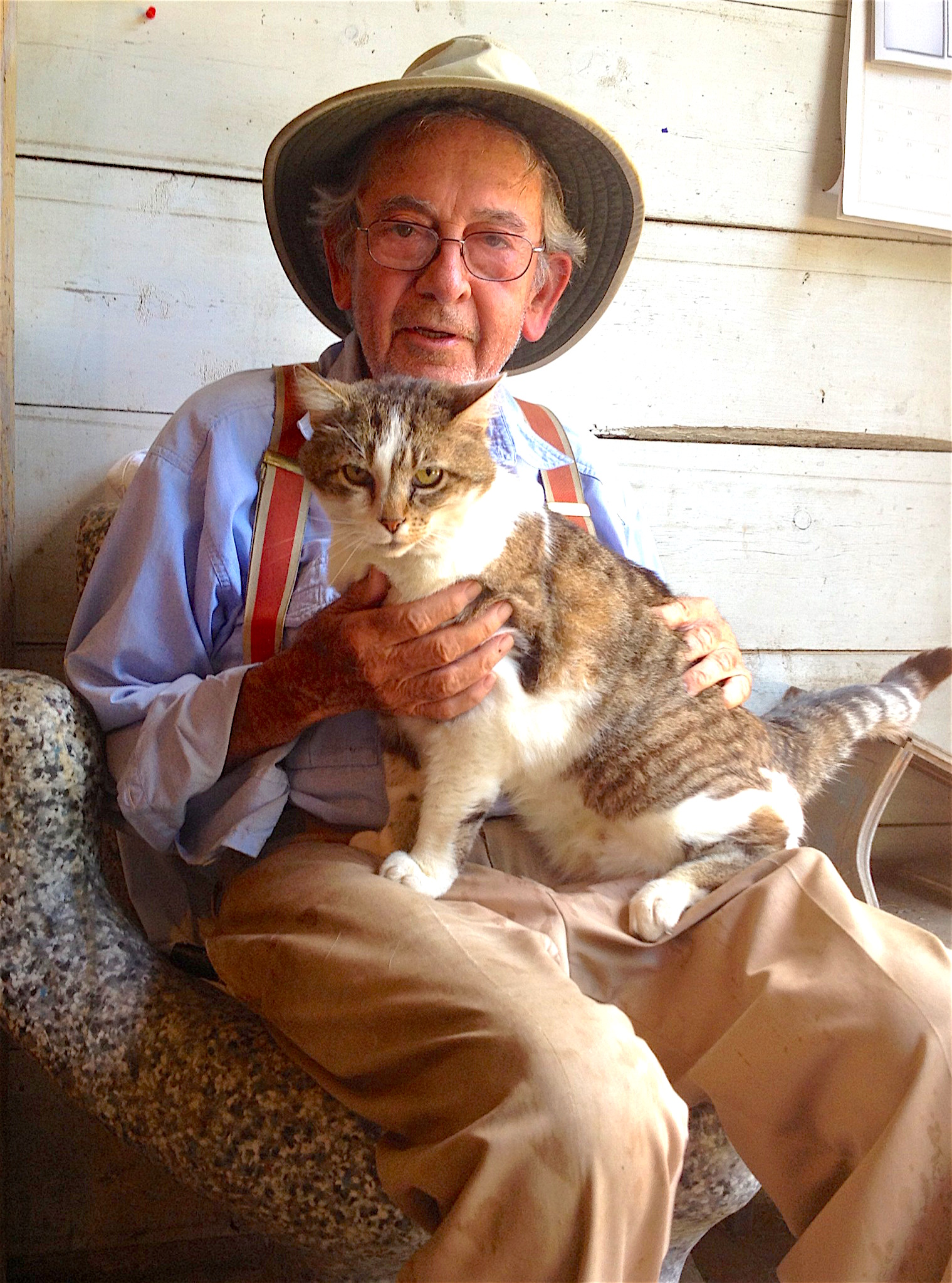
Maurice R. Montgomery in 2014

Maurice R. (Monty) Montgomery (February 24, 1938 – July 23, 2017) was an American author, journalist and columnist for the Boston Globe newspaper, using the byline M. R. Montgomery. He was born in Glasgow, Montana and received degrees in American history from Stanford University and the University of Oregon. His works include In Search of L. L. Bean (1984); A Field Guide to Airplanes of North America; Saying Goodbye: A Memoir for Two Fathers (1989); The Way of the Trout: An Essay on Anglers, Native Trout and the Remains of Wilderness (1991); Jefferson and the Gun-Men: How the West Was Almost Lost; A Cow's Life: The Surprising History of Cattle and How the Black Angus Came to Be Home on the Range; and Many Rivers to Cross. He appeared in the documentary film Home to Montana (1989), produced by Montana PBS and directed by Paul Monaco. This film was based in part on his book Goodbye: A Memoir for Two Fathers and an article he wrote for The New Yorker Magazine, entitled "Impalpable Dust" (1989). He also appeared in the PBS documentary The Way of the Trout in Montana, about the impact of non-native fish introduction on the rivers and native species of Montana. He lived in Lincoln, Massachusetts.
