= Fort Peck Theatre =

- U.S. National Register of Historic Places
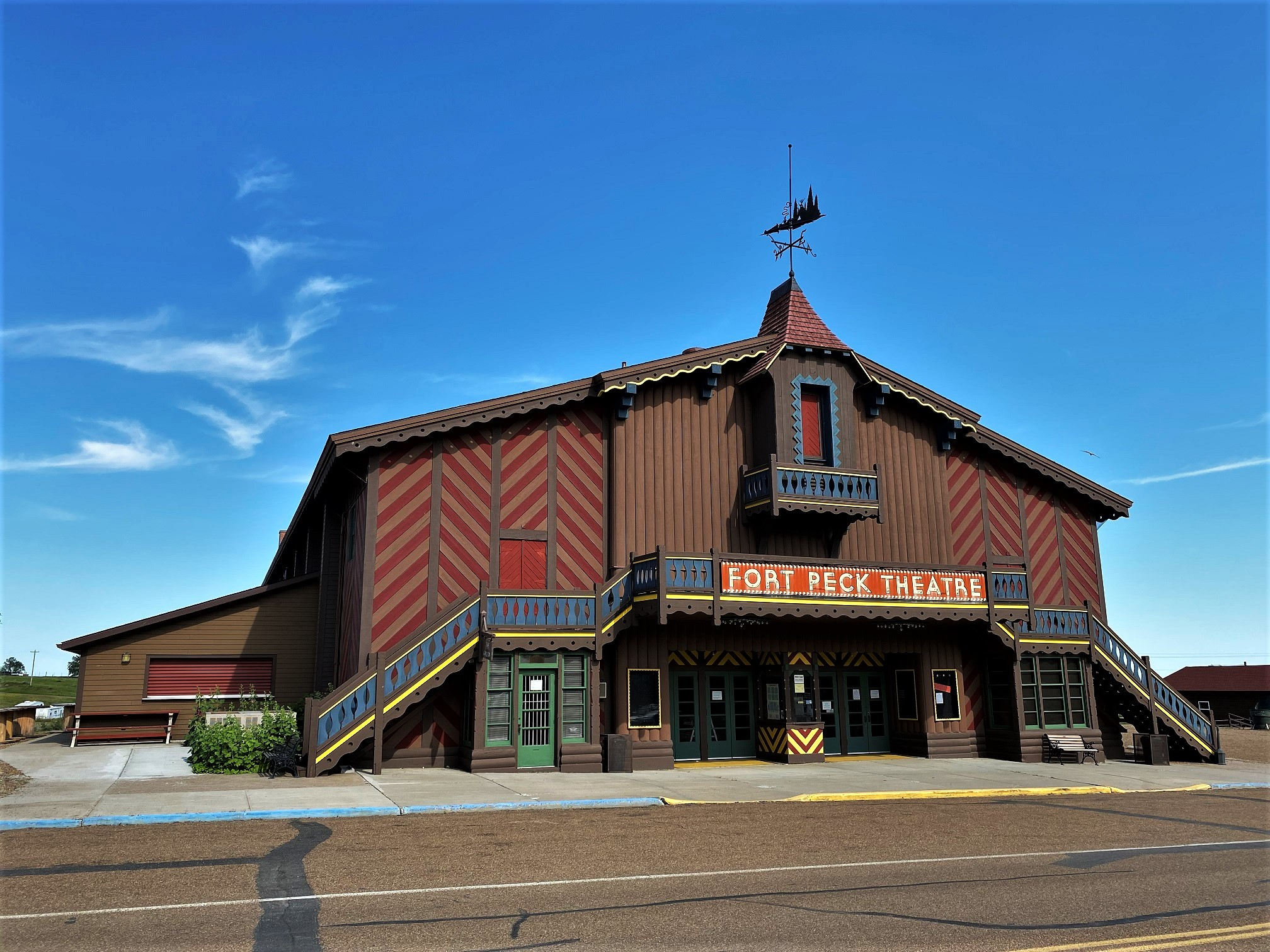

- Location within Montana Location within the United States
- Location: Missouri Ave. Fort Peck, Montana
- Coordinates: 48°0′27″N 106°27′0″W
- Area: 1.2 acres (0.49 ha)
- Built: 1934
- Built by: Eugene Frank Gilstrap / C.F. Haglin Co.
- Architectural style: Swiss Chalet
- NRHP reference No.: 83001077
- Added to NRHP: June 27, 1983

The Fort Peck Theatre was built as a temporary structure in 1934 in Fort Peck, Montana, to serve as a movie theatre. It is also known as the Fort Peck Summer Theatre. The theater was designed in a pseudo-Swiss-chalet style as an amenity for the 50,000 U.S. Army Corps of Engineers workers and their families at the Fort Peck Dam project. The interior features open-truss wood construction, with handcrafted light fixtures fabricated in Corps of Engineers workshops. The theater survived to become a permanent facility, and as of 2026 houses an annual professional summerstock theatre company.

The building includes a stage, a 1209-seat auditorium, a lounge, a foyer, a lobby, a manager's office, and four dressing rooms. It was designed and/or built by Eugene Frank Gilstrap and the C.F. Haglin Co.

Its NRHP nomination compares it to the architecturally significant Timberline Lodge in Oregon.
