= Fort Peck Dam =

Dam in Montana, US

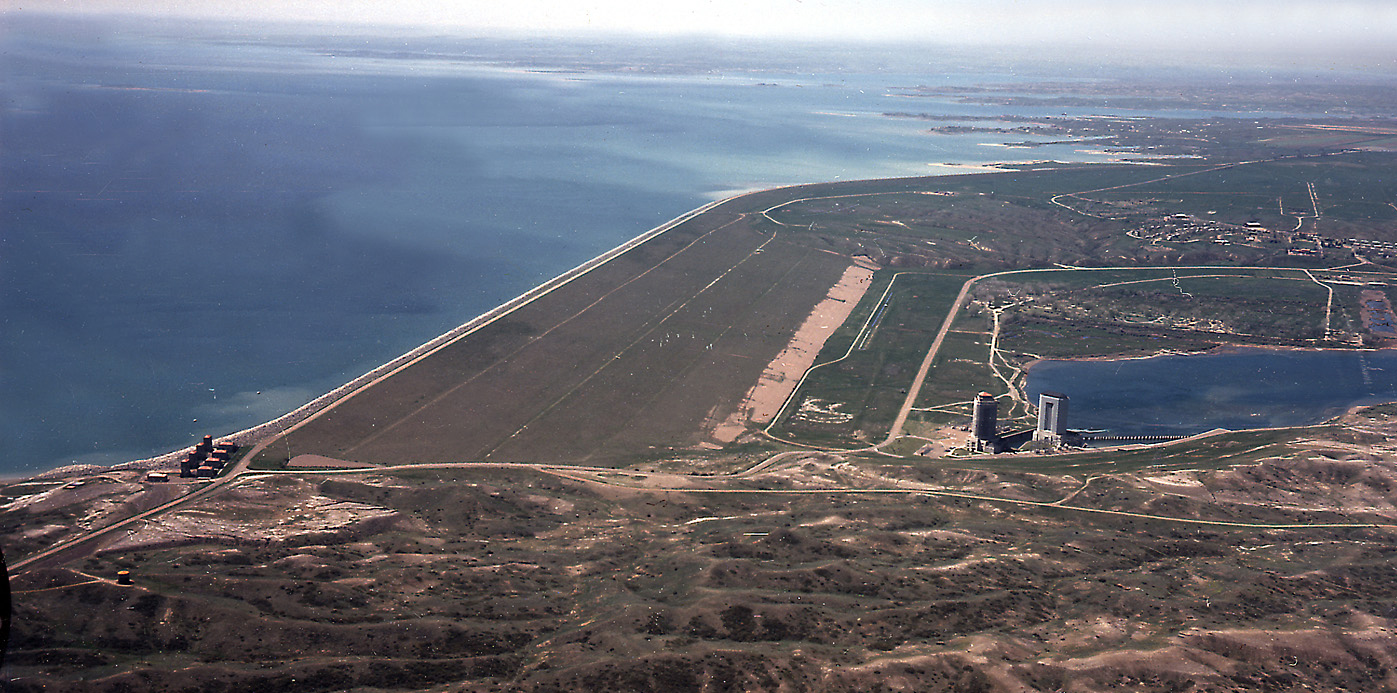
- Aerial view of Fort Peck Dam, looking west. Fort Peck, Montana. 1986

- Location of the Fort Peck Dam in Montana
- Country: United States
- Location: Fort Peck, Montana
- Coordinates: 48°00′10″N 106°24′58″W
- Construction began: 1933; 93 years ago
- Opening date: 1940; 86 years ago
- Construction cost: $100 million
- Owners: U.S. Army Corps of Engineers, Omaha District

Dam and spillways
- Type of dam: Hydraulic earthfill
- Impounds: Missouri River
- Height: 250 ft (76 m)
- Length: 21,026 ft (6,409 m)
- Width (crest): 50 ft (15 m)
- Width (base): 3,500 ft (1,100 m)
- Dam volume: 125,628,000 yd^{3} (96,049,000 m^{3})
- Spillway type: Controlled overflow, 8x bulkhead gates
- Spillway capacity: 250,000 cu ft/s (7,100 m^{3}/s)

Reservoir
- Creates: Fort Peck Lake
- Total capacity: 18,463,000 acre⋅ft (22.774 km^{3})
- Catchment area: 57,500 sq mi (149,000 km^{2})
- Surface area: 241,000 acres (98,000 ha)

Power Station
- Operator: U.S. Army Corps of Engineers
- Hydraulic head: 220 ft (67 m)
- Turbines: 5x vertical Francis turbines
- Installed capacity: 185 MW
- Annual generation: 1,048 GWh
- Website; U.S. Army Corps of Engineers - Fort Peck Project
- Fort Peck Dam
- U.S. National Register of Historic Places
- Location within Montana Location within the United States
- Location: On the Missouri River, Fort Peck, Montana
- Area: 500 acres (200 ha)
- Built: 1933
- Built by: U.S. Army Corps of Engineers
- Architectural style: Art Deco
- MPS: Fort Peck MRA
- NRHP reference No.: 86002061
- Added to NRHP: August 13, 1986

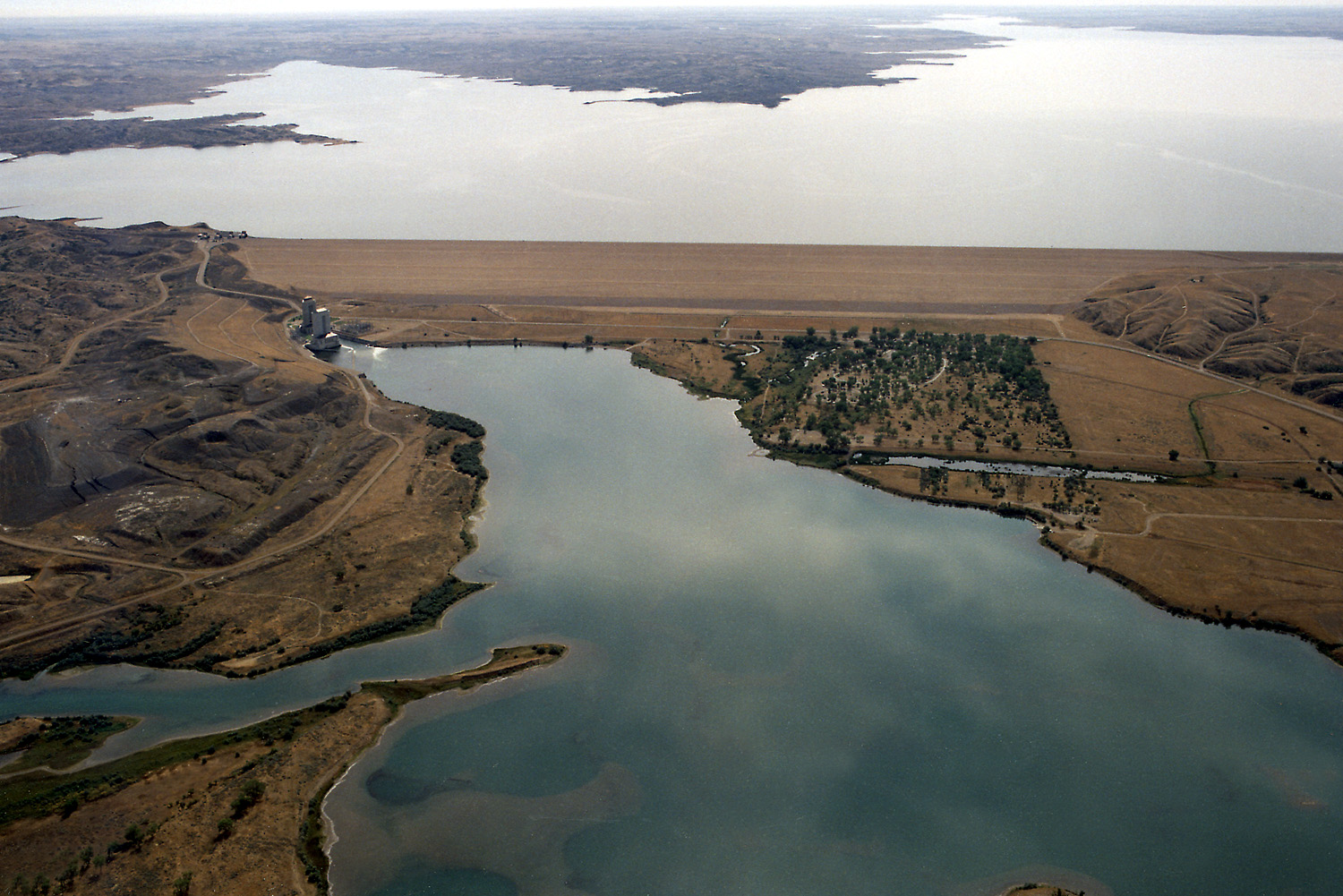
Fort Peck Dam on the Missouri River. View is upriver to the southeast.

The Fort Peck Dam is the highest of six major dams along the Missouri River, located in northeast Montana in the United States, near Glasgow, and adjacent to the community of Fort Peck. At 21,026 feet (6,409 m) in length and over 250 feet (76 m) in height, it is the largest hydraulically filled dam in the United States, and creates Fort Peck Lake, the fifth largest artificial lake in the U.S., more than 130 miles (210 km) long, 200 feet (61 m) deep, and it has a 1,520-mile (2,450 km) shoreline which is longer than the state of California's coastline. It lies within the Charles M. Russell National Wildlife Refuge. The dam and the 134-mile-long (216 km) lake are owned and operated by the U.S. Army Corps of Engineers and exist for the purposes of hydroelectric power generation, flood control, and water quality management.

The dam presently has a nameplate capacity of 185.25 megawatts, divided among 5 generating units (which in turn are divided between the Western and Eastern grids). Three units in powerhouse number one, completed in 1951, have a capacity of 105 MW. Completed in 1961, the two remaining generating units in powerhouse number 2, have a nameplate capacity of 80 MW.

The lake has a maximum operating pool elevation of 2,250 feet (686 m) above mean sea level and a normal operating pool elevation of 2,246 feet (685 m) above mean sea level. The lake level fluctuates over time based on a number of factors. During the first week of February 2007, the reservoir set a record low elevation of 2,197 feet (670 m) above mean sea level, nearly 12 feet (3.7 m) lower than the previous record low set in 1991. In June 2011, in response to the 2011 Missouri River Floods, the dam was releasing almost 66,000 cubic feet per second (1,900 m^{3}/s), which greatly exceeded its previous record release of 35,000 cu ft/s (990 m^{3}/s) set in 1975.

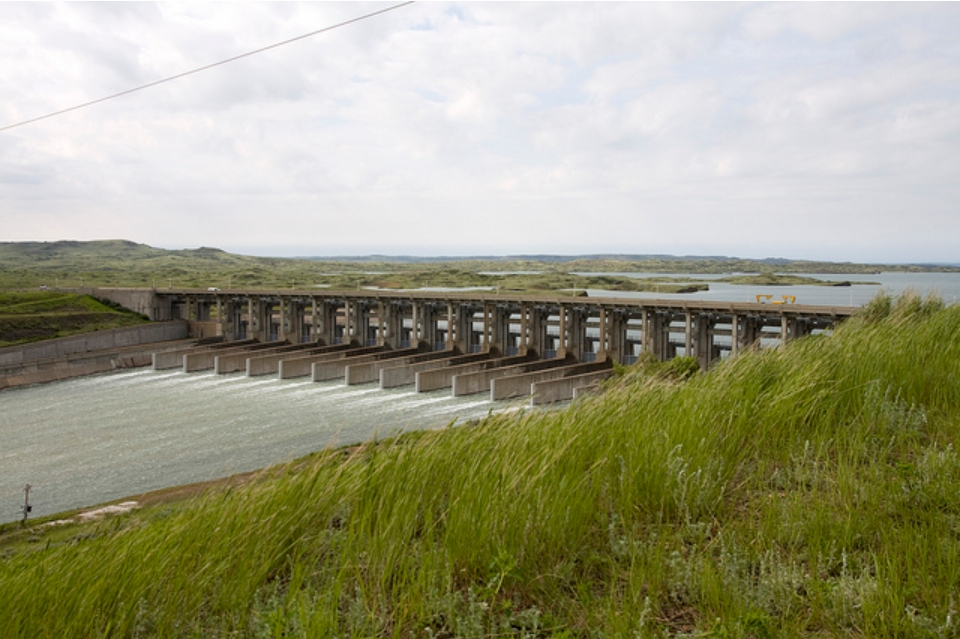

== Background ==
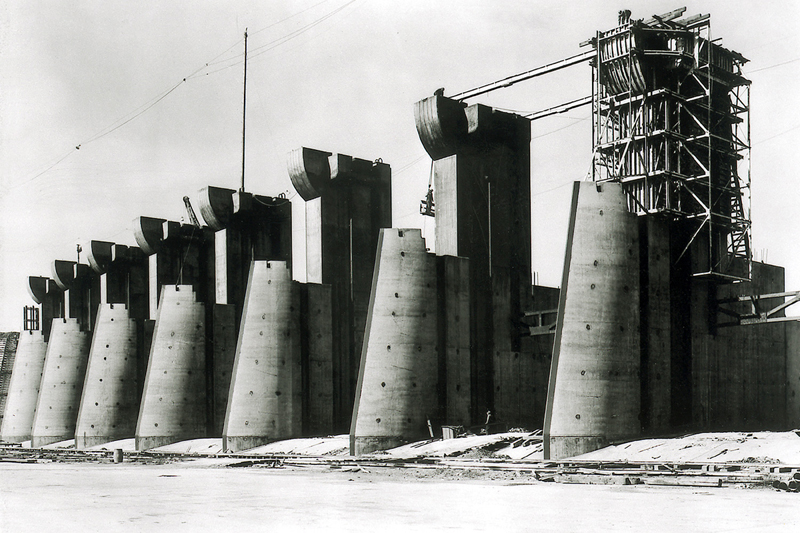
Fort Peck Dam spillway construction. Gate piers No. 3-9 completed. Pouring No. 10. Fort Peck, Montana

Fort Peck was a major project of the Public Works Administration, part of the New Deal. Construction of Fort Peck Dam started in 1933, and at its peak in July 1936 employed 10,546 workers. The dam, named for a 19th-century trading post, was completed in 1940, and began generating electricity in July 1943. The town of Fort Peck, Montana, "the government town," was built for Army Corps of Engineers personnel and men in "positions of responsibility" and their families during the dam's construction. Many of the facilities that supported the dam's workers are still used today, such as the recreation center and the Fort Peck Theater. In addition to Fort Peck, other towns sprang up to house the workers. Among these were Wheeler and McCone City as well as more than a dozen others. Many of the homes were later moved to farms and towns around Montana.

Fort Peck Dam is one of six Missouri River Main stem dams operated by the U.S. Army Corps of Engineers, Omaha District. The dams downstream of Fort Peck Dam are: Garrison Dam (near Riverdale, North Dakota), Oahe Dam (near Pierre, South Dakota), Big Bend Dam (near Fort Thompson, South Dakota), Fort Randall Dam (near Pickstown, South Dakota), and Gavins Point Dam (near Yankton, South Dakota). These six mainstem dams impound these Missouri River reservoirs with a total combined water storage capacity of approximately 73,129,000 acre⋅ft (90.203 km^{3}) and approximately 1,111,884 acres (449,963 ha) of water surface area.

== Construction ==
The site chosen was on a stretch of the Missouri River flowing from south to north. The river bed at the site consisted of approximately 160 feet (49 m) of alluvial deposits, varying from coarse, pervious sands and gravels to impermeable clays. Beneath these deposits lay a thick (approximately 1,000 feet (300 m)) deposit of Bear Paw shale. This shale is classified as a firm shale and contains thin (<1 to 6 in (2.5 to 15.2 cm) layers of bentonite. The topmost layer of soft clay was removed from the alluvium in order to found the dam on the stable sandy deposits beneath, at an elevation of approximately 2,050 feet (620 m). The remaining deposits consisted of the alluvial materials mentioned above. These deposits had many interconnecting layers of coarse sands and gravels, necessitating the installation of a steel sheet pile wall down to the firm shale, from the left to the right abutment.

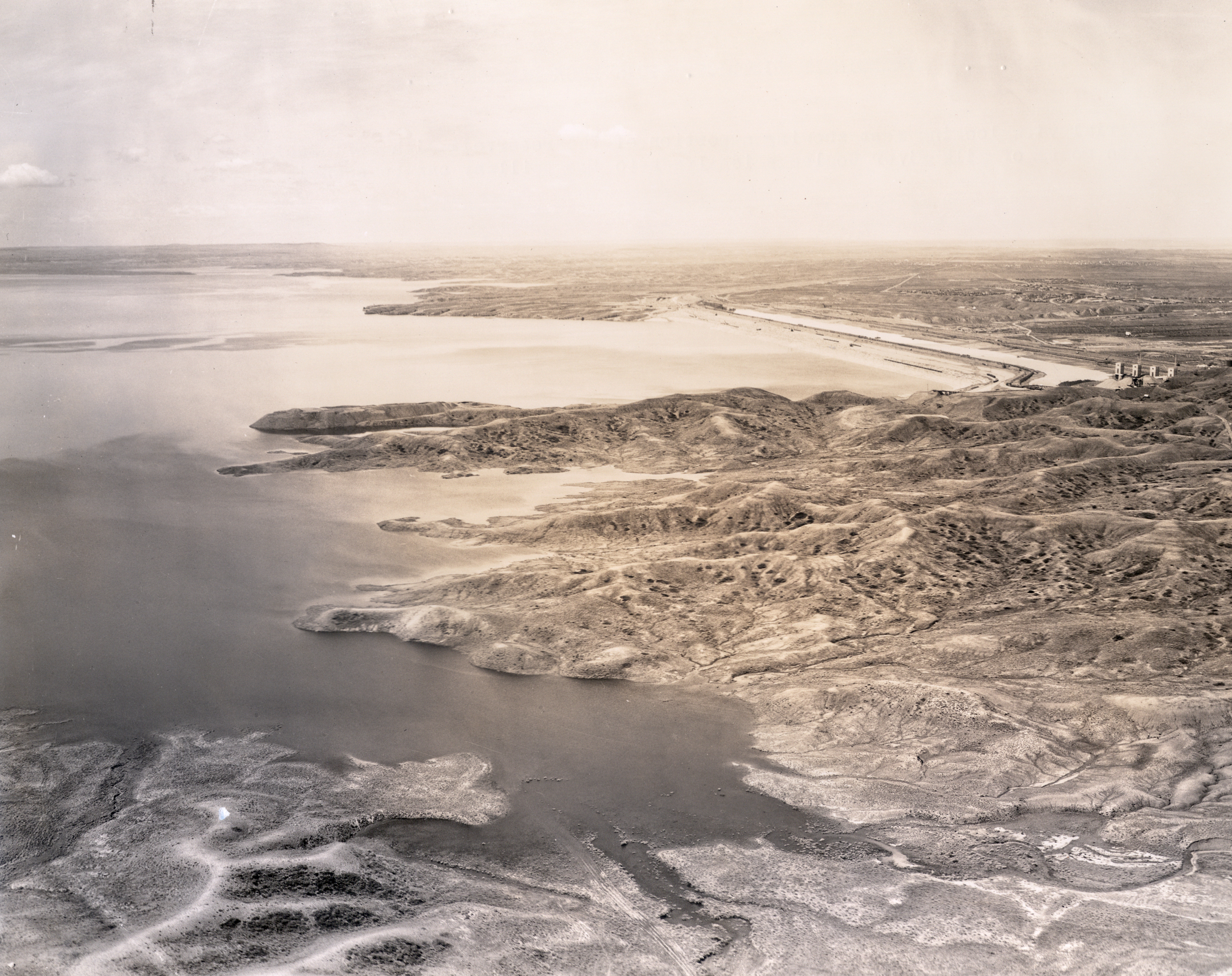
An aerial view of the main Fort Peck Dam structure looking westward with Milk Coulee Bay in the foreground. Just out of view to right would be the intake for the spillway. June 29, 1938. Courtesy, estate of Robert A. Midthun.

As designed, the dam extends to an elevation of 2,275 feet (693 m), for a total height of 225 feet (69 m) from the cleared river bed and has a length from the left to the right abutment of approximately 10,500 feet (3,200 m). The upstream face was designed with an average slope of one vertical on four horizontal and included three horizontal shelves built into the slope. A flatter (1 on 7.5) berm was to be placed between stations 30+00 and 75+00 (approximately the center half of the length of the dam).

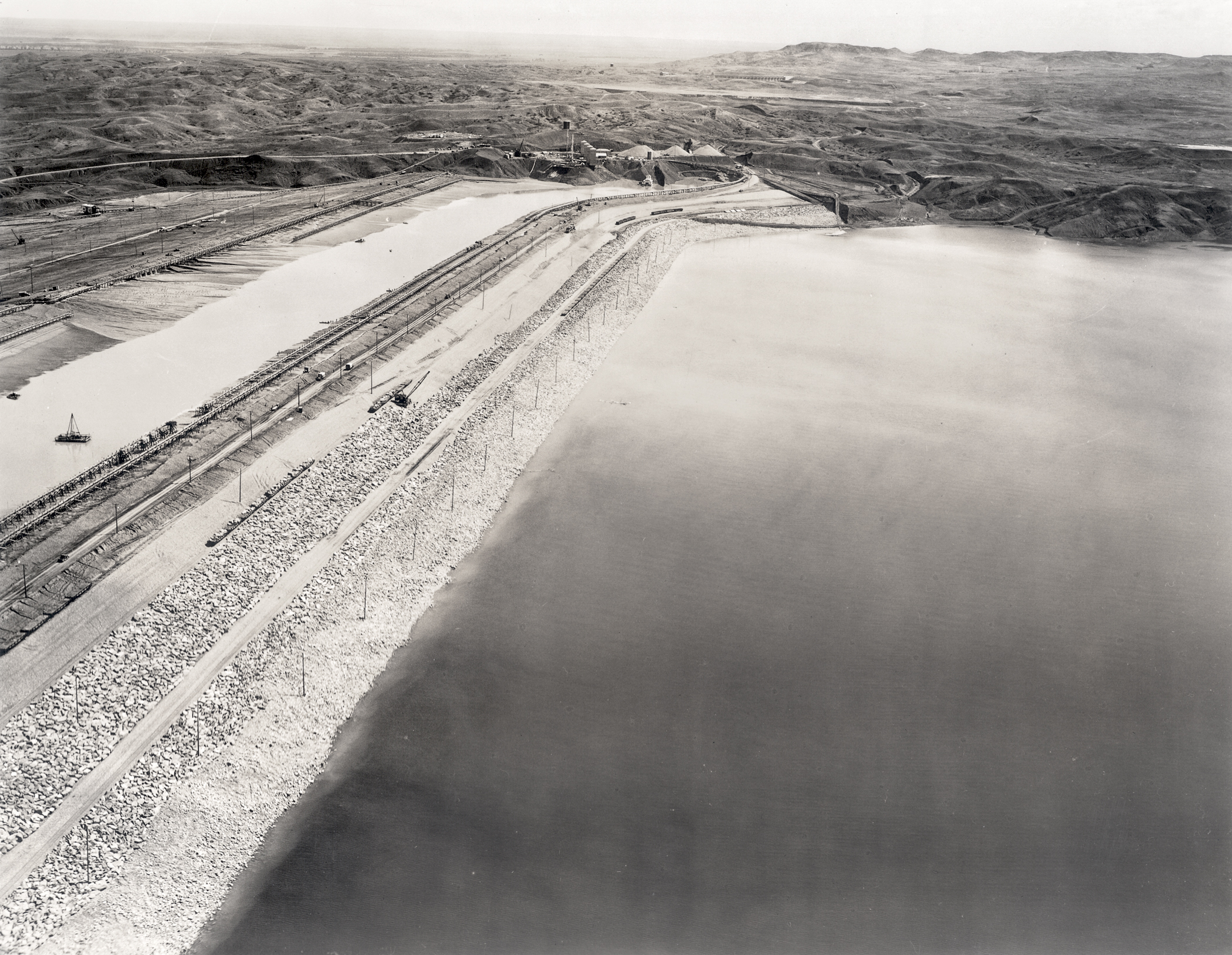
A view of the intact Fort Peck Dam during construction before the disastrous slide of September 22, 1938 which occurred at the far eastern end, located top center in this image. June 29, 1938. Courtesy, estate of Robert A. Midthun.

Since the construction method of hydraulic fill was chosen, four electric dredges were built. Because of the distance of the site from the nearest shoreline, a shipyard was started on the site, affectionately dubbed "The Fort Peck Navy" and "The Biggest Shipyard in Montana" by the workers. These dredges would pump material from nearby borrow pits to the dam site where it was discharged by pipes along the outside edges of the fill. The coarser material settled out quickly, while the fines were carried downhill toward what would eventually become the core of the dam. Samples were taken from all zones regularly to ensure that the material had the gradation and consolidation characteristics specified by the design.

=== Dam failure during construction ===
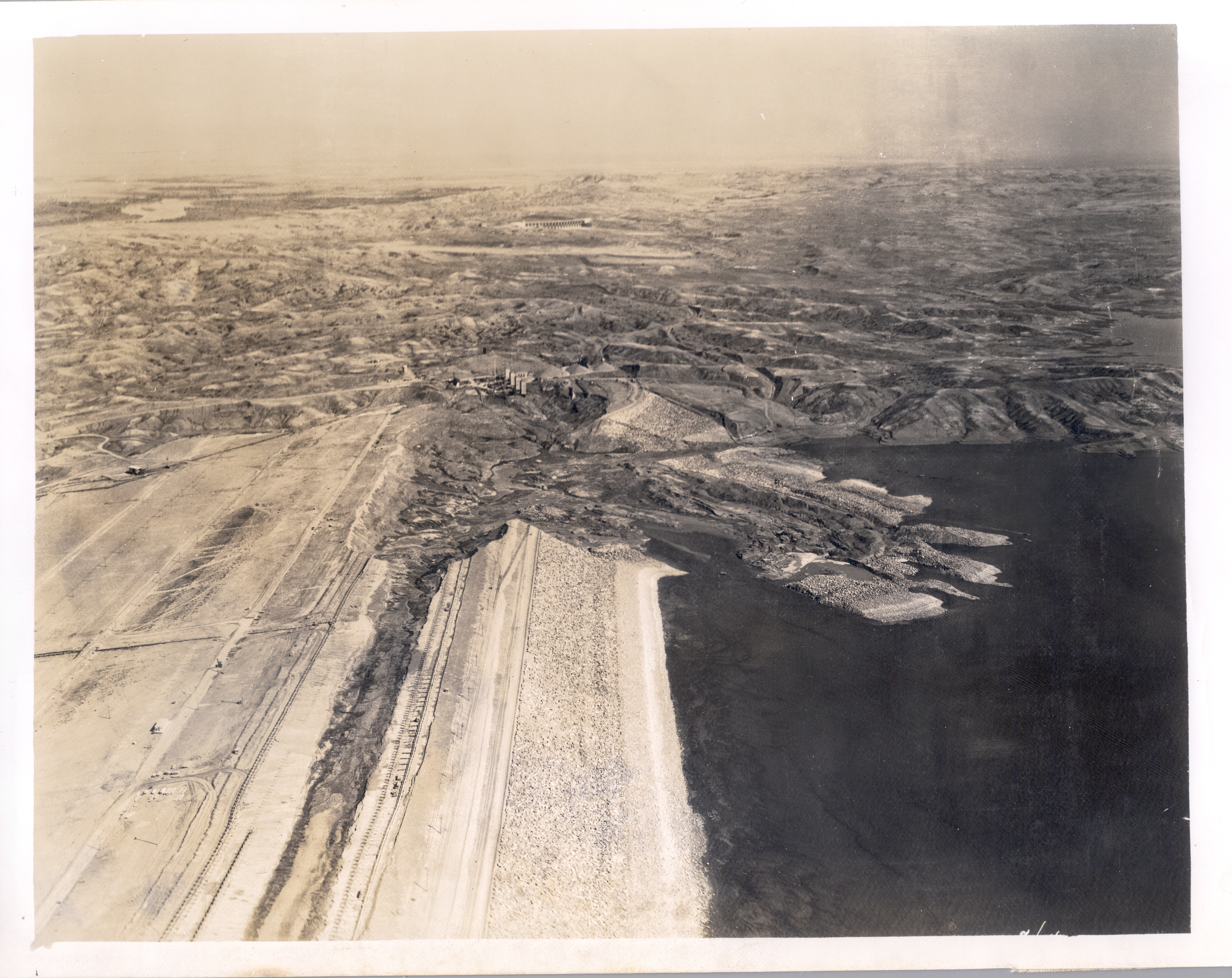
The slide took the lives of 8 men on September 22, 1938. Fort Peck Dam, Fort Peck, Montana. Courtesy, estate of Robert A. Midthun.

This process proceeded until elevation of the fill reached approximately 2,250 feet (690 m), while the reservoir was at an elevation of 2,117.5 feet (645.4 m). At this point, the danger of the core pool overtopping or bursting the shell became greater because the beaches became narrower. For this reason, an extensive alarm system was implemented along the narrower upstream shell. This alarm system could immediately shut off the dredge pumps if a shell breach was detected. Part of this alarm system involved monitoring the elevations of the core pool and the pipelines carrying the dredged fill.

On the morning of September 22, 1938, an inspection by the engineer in charge of construction revealed that the elevation of the pipeline relative to the core pool near station 15+10 (see attached overhead photo) was only 2.5 feet (0.76 m) when it should have been 4.5 feet (1.4 m). A survey crew was dispatched immediately to determine if the fill on which the pipeline was founded was settling or if the pipeline footing itself was settling. Preliminary measurement showed that the pipeline was closer to the pool than expected from station 15+00 to station 17+00. A meeting with the district engineer and supervisory personnel was scheduled for 1:15 p.m. near the location in question.

At approximately 1:15 p.m. the core pool near station 15+00 began to settle slowly. As its rate of settlement increased, cracks appeared 30 feet (9.1 m) below the crest in the upstream embankment. As the settlement of the pool got larger, portions of the shell began to slide backwards into the core pool area and the majority of the upstream shell began to move into the reservoir, translating south and rotating slightly about the east abutment. The west end of the slide mass broke away from the dam near station 27+00 and the core pool water rapidly poured out of the breach that was created in the shell. Portions of the core in the still-stable portion of the dam continued to slump into the hole created by the loss of the slide mass. One construction supervisor was backing his car away from the advancing scarp to the west along the beach to avoid the slumping and noted that the small scarp in the core was advancing to the west at a speed equal to his own (approximately 10 mph (16 km/h)).

A pump barge moored near the dam at the east abutment was swamped by the slide and was lost along with several tractors, loadmasters, and draglines on the slope. Of the 134 men working in the area at the time, 34 were carried into the sliding material. Of these 34, eight were unable to be rescued and lost their lives. Of the eight men, only two bodies were ever recovered, leaving six men permanently entombed in the structure. The dead were:

- Oliver Bucher, 58, laborer, Hinsdale
- John I. Johnson, 25, motorboat operator, Dodson
- Walter Lubbinge, 29, drill runner's helper, New Deal
- Archie Moir, 26, deckhand, Hinsdale
- Douglas J. Moore, 35, associate superintendent, DuBois (body found)
- Dolphie Paulson, 51, laborer
- Albert Stoeser, 23, deckhand, Glasgow (body found)
- Nelson P. VanStone, 31, foreman

In the testing and analysis done by the Corps of Engineers and others to determine the cause of the slide, several modes of failure were considered. These were: movement along a weak zone in the shale in the abutment, movement along the shale surface, bursting of the shell due to excessive core pressure, and temporary liquefaction of the shell or foundation sand. Extensive laboratory testing of the shale, both weathered and unweathered indicated strengths leading to a factor of safety greater than one. Also, portions of the weathered shale were found in the slide mass, indicating that the slip surface was located somewhere in the shale, but probably at a shallow depth. The core material turned out to be much stronger than expected (having a friction angle of approximately 29 degrees) and was carried out into the slide nearly in a solid mass, making it unlikely that the core was the weak point in the slide. Laboratory testing was done on the shell material and the foundation sand and it was determined that both materials were denser than the critical state for liquefaction. There was no evidence of ground vibration, seismic or otherwise. Some liquefaction may have occurred after the sliding was initiated, but it was unlikely that it caused the slide.

The major weak point in the dam seemed to be the bentonite seams in the Bear Paw shale. Very high water pressures were reported at some points in the shale during the construction. This was likely caused by consolidation due to the overburden of the fill being placed for the dam. The excess pore pressures could not be relieved due to the low permeability of the surrounding shale. This resulted in a low effective stress in the bentonite and a very low shear strength.

== 2011 flooding and repairs ==
According to the Billings Gazette, the dam was damaged by "record-high runoff and flooding in 2011." As of March 2013, "more than $42.9 million in repairs to Fort Peck Dam have been approved by the U.S. Army Corps of Engineers."

== Representations in art and literature ==
Fort Peck Dam is probably best known for being the subject of a photograph of the spillway taken by Margaret Bourke-White while still under construction that was the cover photo of the first issue of Life magazine on November 23, 1936. Later, the photograph by Bourke-White was used on a United States postage stamp in the "Celebrate the Century" series.

The dam is also center-stage in Bucking the Sun, by the Montana-born writer Ivan Doig, published in 1996. The novel tells the story of the fictional Duff family and their various roles in the mammoth dam project, and in the process describes the working conditions and way of life of the thousands of workers hired to construct the Fort Peck Dam, many of them homesteaders from upriver farms destined to disappear under the waters of the newly formed Fort Peck Lake.

The Fort Peck Dam is also featured in Ivan Doig’s novel, The Bartender’s Tale.

Fifty Cents an Hour: The Builders and Boomtowns of the Fort Peck Dam, by Montana author Lois Lonnquist, published in 2006, is an overall history of the Fort Peck dam and spillway construction. Built by the Army Corps of Engineers, PWA Project #30 provided thousands of jobs during the Great Depression. The book includes the history of the boomtowns that sprang up in the area, and the "project people" who lived and worked at Fort Peck during the "dam days."

M.R. Montgomery, Personal History, "Impalpable Dust," The New Yorker, March 27, 1989, p. 94 was written by the son of an engineer who worked at the dam during its construction. After his father's death, the author researched the dam's construction and his father's role in it.
