= Fort Peck Community College =

Tribal land-grant community college in Poplar, Montana, U.S.

- Type: Public tribal land-grant community college
- Established: 1969
- Affiliations: Assiniboine and Sioux tribal affiliation
- Academic affiliations: American Indian Higher Education Consortium; American Association of Community Colleges; Space-grant
- President: James E. Shanley
- Students: 430
- Location: Poplar, Montana, U.S. 48°06′49″N 105°11′34″W
- Campus: Rural
- Website: www.fpcc.edu

Fort Peck Community College (FPCC) is a public tribal land-grant community college in Poplar, Montana. The college is located on the Fort Peck Assiniboine & Sioux Reservation in the northeast corner of Montana, which encompasses over two million acres. The college also has a satellite campus in Wolf Point.

== History ==
FPCC was chartered by the Fort Peck Assiniboine and Sioux Tribes in 1978. The decision to found FPCC was based on the reservation's need to provide opportunities for post-secondary education and community service in their home communities. In 1994, the college was designated a land-grant college alongside 31 other tribal colleges. FPCC was granted accreditation by the Northwest Commission on Colleges and Universities in December 1991.

== Academics ==
FPCC offers 25 associate degree and vocational programs for local residents and businesses. FPCC is a two-year degree-granting community college that offers programs to meet the career goals of its students and the training needs of the reservation:

- Associate of Arts,
- Associate of Science, and
- Associate of Applied Science degrees, and
- one-year vocational training certificates.

FPCC also offers associate degrees and certificates in over 30 fields of study.

== Partnerships ==
FPCC holds accreditation by the Northwest Association of Schools and Colleges, Commission on Colleges. The institution is a member of the American Indian Higher Education Consortium (AIHEC) and American Association of Community Colleges (AACC). The college is a member of the American Indian Higher Education Consortium (AIHEC) and American Association of Community Colleges (AACC).

FPCC's articulation agreements with four-year institutions Rocky Mountain College, Montana State University - Northern, and the University of Montana, allow students to earn bachelor's degrees in

- elementary education,
- business, technology,
- information technology and
- psychology.

== See also ==
- Janine Pease
