= Fort Peck, Montana =

- Town
- Location of Fort Peck, Montana
- Coordinates: 48°00′25″N 106°27′19″W
- Country: United States
- State: Montana
- County: Valley

Area
  - Total: 0.89 sq mi (2.31 km^{2})
  - Land: 0.89 sq mi (2.31 km^{2})
  - Water: 0 sq mi (0.00 km^{2})
- Elevation: 2,202 ft (671 m)

Population (2020)
  - Total: 239
  - Density: 268/sq mi (103.3/km^{2})
- Time zone: UTC-7 (Mountain (MST))
  - Summer (DST): UTC-6 (MDT)
- ZIP code: 59255
- Area code: 406
- FIPS code: 30-28450
- GNIS feature ID: 2412642

Fort Peck is a town in Valley County, Montana, United States. The population was 239 at the 2020 census.

== History ==
The name Fort Peck is associated with Col. Campbell K. Peck, the partner of Elias H. Durfee in the Leavenworth, Kansas trading firm of Durfee and Peck. In 1867, company employee Abe Farwell constructed the Fort Peck trading post along the Missouri River, which enjoyed a virtual monopoly in trade with the Sioux and Assiniboine people. After its short life as a trading post, Fort Peck served as an Indian agency from 1873 until 1878. At that time, the agency was moved to its current location at Poplar. Fort Peck had a post office from 1879 to 1881.

A new town of Fort Peck, located approximately two miles north of the original, was built in 1934 to house Army Corps of Engineers employees involved in the construction of the Fort Peck Dam. Designed to be temporary, the government-owned town nevertheless included many features of a permanent town, including an administrative headquarters, a hospital, stores, a theater, a recreation hall, and other facilities. Totally inadequate to house the 10,000-plus employees, Fort Peck was soon joined by numerous shanty towns, including Wheeler, New Deal, Delano Heights, and Park Grove. The Fort Peck Original Houses Historic District, the Fort Peck Theatre, and the hospital, administration building, and other associated public works properties are listed in the National Register.

The Administration Building, the Employee's Hotel and Garage, the Garage and Fire Station, the Hospital, and the Recreation Hall of the government-run town are listed on the National Register of Historic Places.

== Culture ==
The U.S. Army Corps of Engineers, which oversees the powerhouses, dam, lake, and dredge cuts, is the major employer in Fort Peck, as well as, other government programs. Until recently all of the houses in Fort Peck were government built.

Fort Peck draws people from hundreds of miles away to recreate around Fort Peck Reservoir. Most popular is utilizing the lake and dredge cuts for boating, swimming, and fishing. Camping and barbecuing are very popular and facilities for camping and cooking are well developed.

Besides the lake, Fort Peck offers several more activities. The Fort Peck Theatre performs plays during the summer and draws large crowds. The Fort Peck Interpretive Center shows the history of the area, from the dinosaurs to the dam.

== Geography ==
According to the United States Census Bureau, the town has a total area of 0.86 square miles (2.23 km^{2}), all land.

=== Climate ===
Climate data for Fort Peck, Montana (Fort Peck Power Plant) (1991–2020 normals, extremes 1945–present)
Month	Jan	Feb	Mar	Apr	May	Jun	Jul	Aug	Sep	Oct	Nov	Dec	Year
Record high °F (°C)	59 (15)	69 (21)	80 (27)	91 (33)	100 (38)	107 (42)	108 (42)	110 (43)	103 (39)	91 (33)	78 (26)	66 (19)	110 (43)
Mean maximum °F (°C)	49.8 (9.9)	52.3 (11.3)	67.4 (19.7)	78.4 (25.8)	86.8 (30.4)	94.9 (34.9)	99.4 (37.4)	99.7 (37.6)	93.7 (34.3)	81.2 (27.3)	64.0 (17.8)	51.5 (10.8)	101.6 (38.7)
Mean daily maximum °F (°C)	28.3 (−2.1)	33.2 (0.7)	46.2 (7.9)	60.0 (15.6)	70.7 (21.5)	79.6 (26.4)	88.6 (31.4)	88.3 (31.3)	76.6 (24.8)	60.9 (16.1)	44.1 (6.7)	32.3 (0.2)	59.1 (15.1)
Daily mean °F (°C)	17.9 (−7.8)	22.4 (−5.3)	34.3 (1.3)	46.9 (8.3)	57.2 (14.0)	66.3 (19.1)	73.5 (23.1)	72.6 (22.6)	62.1 (16.7)	48.8 (9.3)	33.9 (1.1)	22.4 (−5.3)	46.5 (8.1)
Mean daily minimum °F (°C)	7.5 (−13.6)	11.6 (−11.3)	22.4 (−5.3)	33.7 (0.9)	43.8 (6.6)	53.0 (11.7)	58.5 (14.7)	56.8 (13.8)	47.6 (8.7)	36.6 (2.6)	23.7 (−4.6)	12.5 (−10.8)	34.0 (1.1)
Mean minimum °F (°C)	−18.7 (−28.2)	−12.6 (−24.8)	−1.9 (−18.8)	17.0 (−8.3)	28.8 (−1.8)	41.2 (5.1)	47.2 (8.4)	42.7 (5.9)	31.4 (−0.3)	17.5 (−8.1)	0.8 (−17.3)	−11.7 (−24.3)	−24.8 (−31.6)
Record low °F (°C)	−43 (−42)	−40 (−40)	−28 (−33)	−4 (−20)	9 (−13)	28 (−2)	39 (4)	33 (1)	15 (−9)	−4 (−20)	−24 (−31)	−38 (−39)	−43 (−42)
Average precipitation inches (mm)	0.30 (7.6)	0.30 (7.6)	0.38 (9.7)	0.92 (23)	2.52 (64)	2.67 (68)	2.39 (61)	1.40 (36)	1.05 (27)	0.94 (24)	0.36 (9.1)	0.35 (8.9)	13.58 (345)
Average precipitation days (≥ 0.01 in)	4.8	4.1	4.4	5.8	9.5	10.6	7.7	5.6	5.9	5.6	4.0	4.5	72.5
Source: NOAA

== Demographics ==
Historical population
Census	Pop.	Note	%±
1990	325		—
2000	240		−26.2%
2010	233		−2.9%
2020	239		2.6%
U.S. Decennial Census

=== 2010 census ===
As of the census of 2010, there were 233 people, 99 households, and 73 families living in the town. The population density was 270.9 inhabitants per square mile (104.6/km^{2}). There were 110 housing units at an average density of 127.9 per square mile (49.4/km^{2}). The racial makeup of the town was 93.6% White, 3.0% Native American, 0.4% Asian, and 3.0% from two or more races.

There were 99 households, of which 22.2% had children under the age of 18 living with them, 68.7% were married couples living together, 2.0% had a female householder with no husband present, 3.0% had a male householder with no wife present, and 26.3% were non-families. 21.2% of all households were made up of individuals, and 9.1% had someone living alone who was 65 years of age or older. The average household size was 2.35 and the average family size was 2.74.

The median age in the town was 48.9 years. 18% of residents were under the age of 18; 4.4% were between the ages of 18 and 24; 19.4% were from 25 to 44; 39.9% were from 45 to 64; and 18.5% were 65 years of age or older. The gender makeup of the town was 52.8% male and 47.2% female.

=== 2000 census ===
As of the census of 2000, there were 240 people, 91 households, and 75 families living in the town. The population density was 274.9 inhabitants per square mile (106.1/km^{2}). There were 99 housing units at an average density of 113.4 per square mile (43.8/km^{2}). The racial makeup of the town was 96.25% White, 2.08% Native American, and 1.67% from two or more races.

There were 91 households, out of which 38.5% had children under the age of 18 living with them, 73.6% were married couples living together, 5.5% had a female householder with no husband present, and 16.5% were non-families. 14.3% of all households were made up of individuals, and 7.7% had someone living alone who was 65 years of age or older. The average household size was 2.64 and the average family size was 2.89.

In the town, the population was spread out, with 28.8% under the age of 18, 2.9% from 18 to 24, 21.7% from 25 to 44, 32.9% from 45 to 64, and 13.8% who were 65 years of age or older. The median age was 43 years. For every 100 females, there were 92.0 males. For every 100 females age 18 and over, there were 87.9 males.

The median income for a household in the town was $47,083, and the median income for a family was $50,938. Males had a median income of $32,500 versus $33,750 for females. The per capita income for the town was $17,943. None of the families and 0.8% of the population were living below the poverty line, including no under eighteens and 6.9% of those over 64.

== Notable people ==
- Ron Hauge, Emmy award-winning writer for The Simpsons grew up here.
- Wayne Hawkins, Oakland Raiders guard, was born here.

== See also ==
- Fort Peck Dam
- Fort Peck Journal
