= Poplar, Montana =

City in Montana, United States

Poplar Waȟnécʿa Wakpá (Assiniboine)
- City
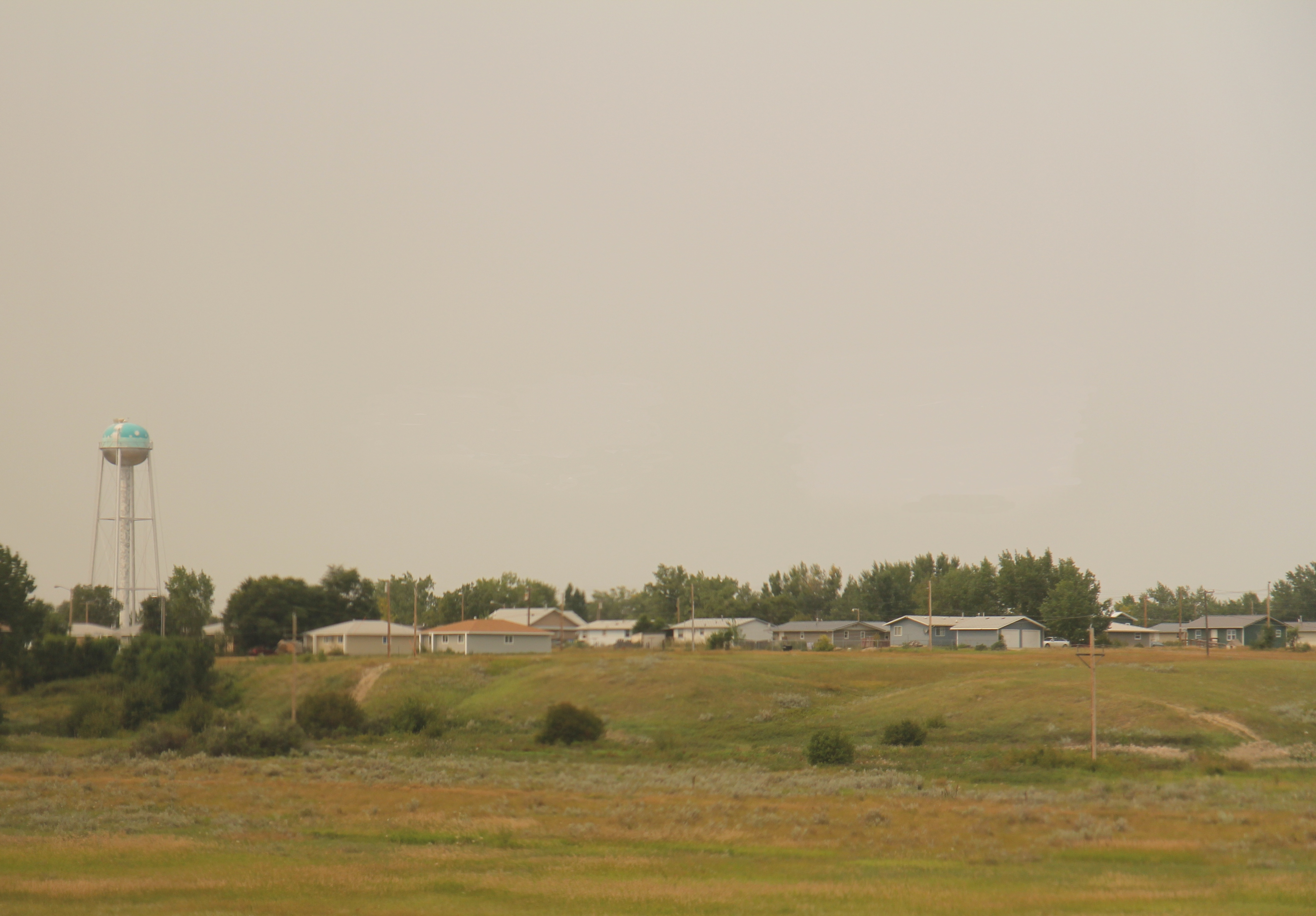
- Panorama of Poplar

- Location of Poplar, Montana
- Coordinates: 48°06′38″N 105°11′49″W
- Country: United States
- State: Montana
- County: Roosevelt

Area
  - Total: 0.28 sq mi (0.72 km^{2})
  - Land: 0.28 sq mi (0.72 km^{2})
  - Water: 0 sq mi (0.00 km^{2})
- Elevation: 1,988 ft (606 m)

Population (2020)
  - Total: 758
  - Density: 2,725.6/sq mi (1,052.36/km^{2})
- Time zone: UTC-7 (Mountain (MST))
  - Summer (DST): UTC-6 (MDT)
- ZIP code: 59255
- Area code: 406
- FIPS code: 30-58975
- GNIS feature ID: 2411458

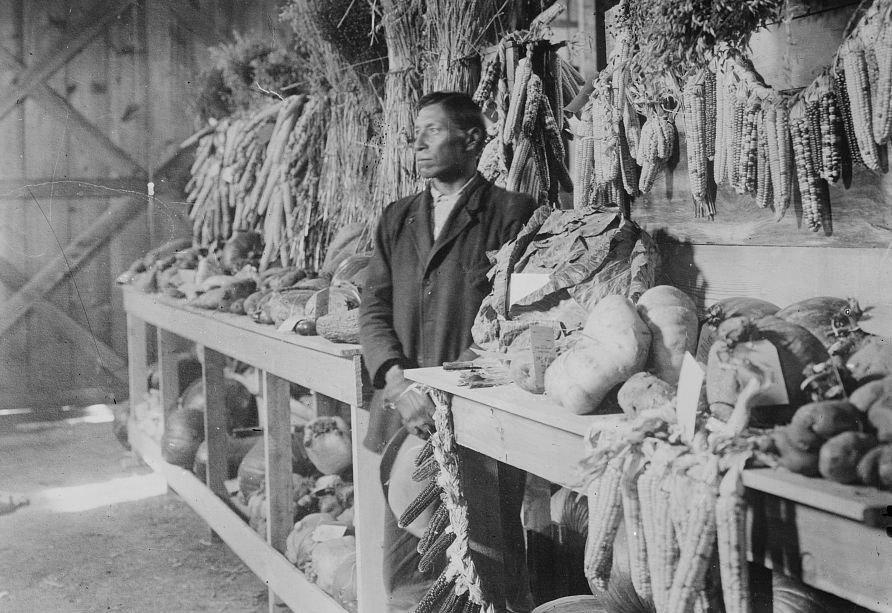
Horse's Ghost at the fair, Poplar, MT

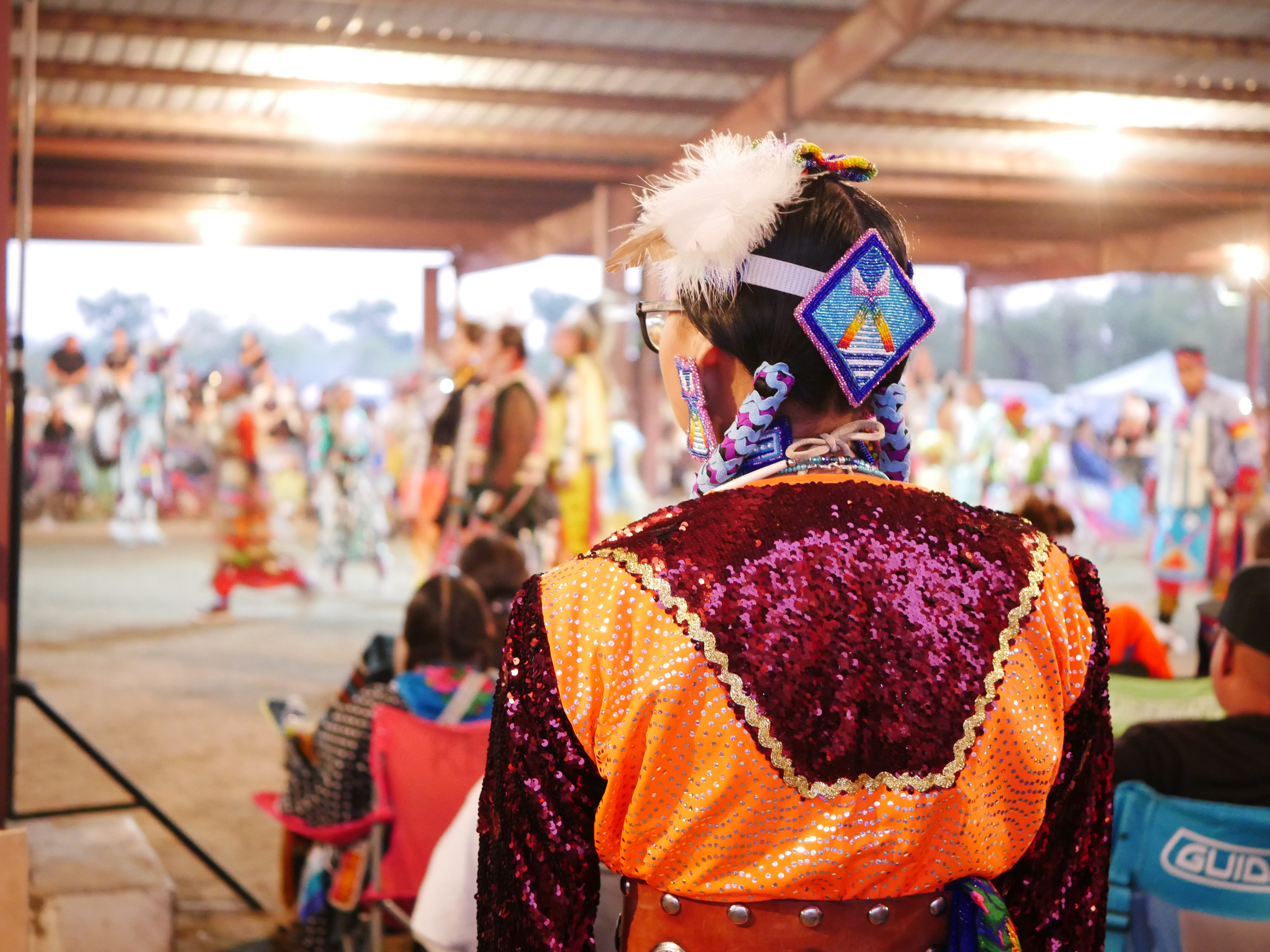
Poplar Indian Days Pow Wow in 2022

Poplar (Assiniboine: Waȟnécʿa Wakpá) is a city in Roosevelt County, Montana, United States. The population was 758 at the 2020 census. It is the tribal headquarters for the Fort Peck Indian Reservation, though Wolf Point is the most populous. The reservation is home to both the Assiniboine and Sioux Tribes, two distinct American Indian Nations.

The U.S. Army constructed Camp Poplar here in the 1870s to oversee the reservation. Poplar became reservation headquarters after the military abandoned the camp in 1893.

Poplar hosts a Native American Pow Wow called Poplar Indian Days every year, the first weekend in September that is well attended by locals and traveling dancers with prizes for dancers and drummers.

== Geography ==
According to the United States Census Bureau, the city has a total area of 0.28 square miles (0.73 km^{2}), all land. The Poplar River joins the Missouri River near town.

=== Climate ===
According to the Köppen Climate Classification system, Poplar has a semi-arid climate, abbreviated "BSk" on climate maps.

== Demographics ==
Historical population
Census	Pop.	Note	%±
1920	1,152		—
1930	1,046		−9.2%
1940	1,442		37.9%
1950	1,169		−18.9%
1960	1,565		33.9%
1970	1,389		−11.2%
1980	995		−28.4%
1990	881		−11.5%
2000	911		3.4%
2010	810		−11.1%
2020	758		−6.4%
U.S. Decennial Census

=== 2010 census ===
As of the census of 2010, there were 810 people, 313 households, and 196 families residing in the city. The population density was 2,892.9 inhabitants per square mile (1,117.0/km^{2}). There were 352 housing units at an average density of 1,257.1 per square mile (485.4/km^{2}). The racial makeup of the city was 25.2% White, 71.4% Native American, 0.2% Asian, 0.1% from other races, and 3.1% from two or more races. Hispanic or Latino of any race were 0.6% of the population.

There were 313 households, of which 40.9% had children under the age of 18 living with them, 31.3% were married couples living together, 19.2% had a female householder with no husband present, 12.1% had a male householder with no wife present, and 37.4% were non-families. 32.3% of all households were made up of individuals, and 9.5% had someone living alone who was 65 years of age or older. The average household size was 2.53 and the average family size was 3.16.

The median age in the city was 31.2 years. 30.7% of residents were under the age of 18; 10.8% were between the ages of 18 and 24; 25% were from 25 to 44; 25% were from 45 to 64; and 8.4% were 65 years of age or older. The gender makeup of the city was 50.2% male and 49.8% female.

=== 2000 census ===
As of the 2000 census, there were 911 people, 325 households, and 206 families residing in the city. The population density was 3,406.0 inhabitants per square mile (1,315.1/km^{2}). There were 350 housing units at an average density of 1,308.5 per square mile (505.2/km^{2}). The racial makeup of the city was 63.67% Native American, 0.11% African American, 32.16% White, 0.77% Asian, 0.22% from other races, and 3.07% from two or more races. Hispanic or Latino of any race were 0.88% of the population.

There were 325 households, out of which 33.5% had children under the age of 18 living with them, 36.9% were married couples living together, 19.4% had a female householder with no husband present, and 36.6% were non-families. 32.3% of all households were made up of individuals, and 12.6% had someone living alone who was 65 years of age or older. The average household size was 2.57 and the average family size was 3.26.

In the city, the population was spread out, with 30.7% under the age of 18, 8.0% from 18 to 24, 29.6% from 25 to 44, 20.2% from 45 to 64, and 11.4% who were 65 years of age or older. The median age was 33 years. For every 100 females, there were 106.1 males. For every 100 females age 18 and over, there were 102.9 males.

The median income for a household in the city was $24,896, and the median income for a family was $29,688. Males had a median income of $22,250 versus $19,000 for females. The per capita income for the city was $10,579. About 23.4% of families and 31.5% of the population were below the poverty line, including 32.6% of those under age 18 and 22.2% of those age 65 or over.

== Government ==
Poplar is the seat for the Fort Peck Sioux and Assiniboine Tribes, including the tribal law enforcement agency, courthouse, and the Fort Peck Reservation correctional facility.

The Bureau of Indian Affairs maintains an agency office in Poplar.

== Education ==
=== K-12 ===
Poplar Public Schools, District 9/2B, is the second largest public school system on the Fort Peck Indian Reservation with a total enrollment of 824 students for the 2006-2007 school year. Poplar Public Schools operates elementary, middle, and junior/senior high schools. Poplar High School's team name is the Indians.

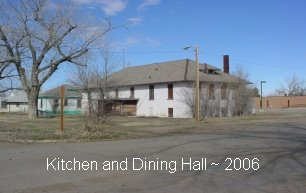
Old Fort Peck Agency building, Poplar, Montana

=== College ===
Poplar is home to the main campus of Fort Peck Community College. A branch campus is located in Wolf Point, Montana.

=== Library ===
The James E. Shanley Tribal Library is an affiliate of Roosevelt County Library and available to all county patrons.

== Infrastructure ==
=== Transportation ===
U.S. Route 2, a major east-west route across the northern tier of states, connects Poplar with other Hi-line communities in Montana and North Dakota. The Poplar Municipal Airport provides for light aircraft and general aviation on a single 4,400 feet (1,341 m) runway. Amtrak serves Wolf Point, approximately 20 miles west.

=== Medical facilities ===
The Indian Health Service (IHS) operates the Vern E. Gibbs Health Center through its Fort Peck Service Unit. The health center provides ambulatory, dialysis, and preventive health services. The IHS contracts with Northeast Montana Health Services (NEMHS) which operates Poplar Community Hospital, a critical access hospital with an emergency room, swingbed unit, pharmacy, 22-bed inpatient facility for inpatient services, as well as the Riverside Clinic, and hospital and clinic in Wolf Point, Montana. Poplar has a BLS and ALS ambulance staffed by first responders and EMTs. The ambulance service averages 4.5 calls a day.

== Notable residents ==
- Barry Beach, convicted murderer
- James Allen Red Dog, serial killer
- Chrysti Smith, radio broadcaster
- William S. Yellow Robe Jr. (Assiniboine, 1960–2021), playwright, author, professor
