= List of ghost towns in Montana =

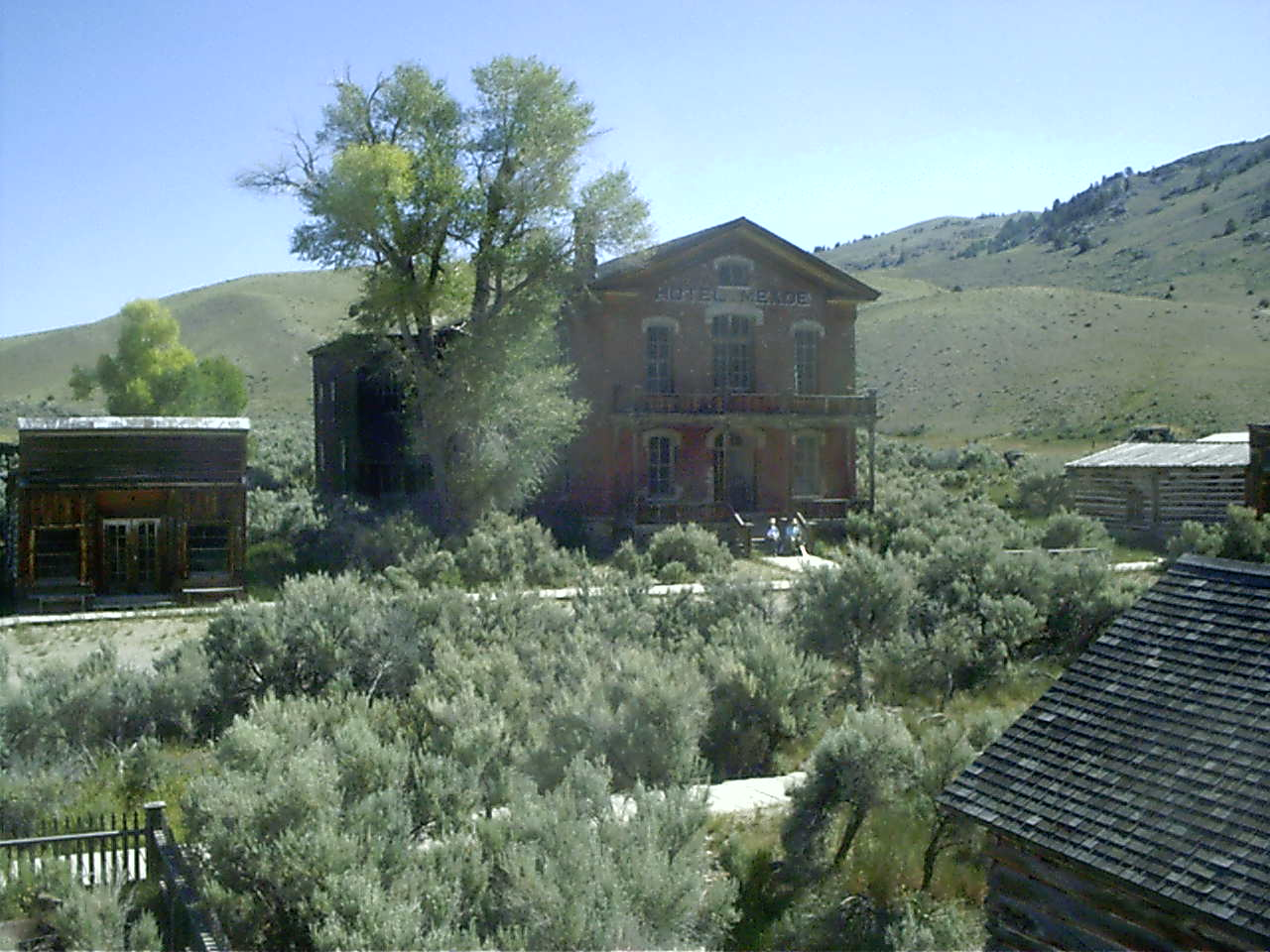
Bannack, a Montana ghost town

This is an incomplete list of ghost towns in Montana.

A ghost town is a town or city which has lost all of its businesses and population. A town often becomes a ghost town because the economic activity that supported it has failed, or due to natural or human-caused disasters such as a flood, government action, uncontrolled lawlessness, or war.

The term is sometimes used in a deprecated sense on the internet to include cities, towns, and neighborhoods which, while still populated, are significantly less so than in years past.

== Abandoned towns ==
- Aldridge, Park County, 45°05′13″N 110°49′18″W, el. 6,427 feet (1,959 m),
- Bannack, Beaverhead County, 45°09′40″N 112°59′44″W, el. 5,728 feet (1,746 m)
- Coloma, Missoula County 46°50′35″N 113°22′50″W, el. 5,928 feet (1,807 m)
- Diamond City, Broadwater County, 46°35′50″N 111°25′26″W, el. 5,005 feet (1,526 m), and satellite communities of El Dorado, Boulder, Jim Town, and Cement Gulch City, all in Confederate Gulch
- Junction City, Yellowstone County, 46°8′34.97″N 107°32′48.40″W
- Kendall, Fergus County
- Rancher, Treasure County
- Rocky Point, Fergus County, 47°36′22.54″N 108°26′45.72″W
- Thoeny, Valley County 48°52′37″N 106°55′03″W
- Wheat Basin, Stillwater County

== Towns with residual population ==
- Albion, Carter County 45°11′14″N 104°16′37″W, el. 3,376 feet (1,029 m)
- Aldridge, Park County
- Alton, built in 2009, Glacier
- Argo
- Barker, Judith Basin County
- Bean, Carbon County
- Bear Creek, Carbon County
- Bearmouth, Granite County
- Beehive, Stillwater County
- Bighorn, Treasure County
- Bowler, Carbon County
- Cable, Deer Lodge County
- Capitol, Carter County
- Carlyle, Wibaux County, 46°39′18″N 104°04′34″W, el. 3,159 feet (963 m)
- Carter, Chouteau County
- Castle Town, Meagher County, 46°26′29″N 110°40′19″W, el. 5,978 feet (1,822 m)
- Chico, Park County
- Coburg, Blaine County
- Comanche, Yellowstone County
- Comertown, Sheridan County, 48°53′49″N 104°15′0″W, el. 2,270 feet (690 m)
- Comet, Jefferson County
- Coolidge, Deer Lodge County
- Copperopolis, Meagher County
- Corwin
- Coulson, Yellowstone County
- Dean, Stillwater County
- Dooley, Sheridan County
- Electric, Park County
- Elkhorn, Jefferson County
- Ewing, Carbon County
- Exeter, Phillips County
- Finch, Rosebud County
- Fox, Carbon County
- Garnet, Granite County
- Giltedge, Fergus County
- Glendale, Beaverhead County
- Gold Creek, Powell County
- Granite, Granite County
- Hassel, Broadwater County
- Hecla, Beaverhead County
- Hesper, Yellowstone County
- Hillsboro, Big Horn County
- Hughesville, Judith Basin County
- Independence, Park County
- Ingomar, Rosebud County
- Jardine, Park County
- Keystone, Mineral County
- Kirkville, Granite County
- Landusky, Phillips County
- Laurin, Madison County
- Lennep, Meagher County
- Leroy, Blaine County
- Limestone, Stillwater County
- Lion City, Beaverhead County
- Lonetree, Chouteau County
- Maiden, Fergus County
- Mammoth, Madison County
- Marysville, Lewis and Clark County
- Maudlow, Gallatin County
- Melrose, Silver Bow County
- Minden, Meagher County
- Mondak, Roosevelt County
- Nevada City, Madison County
- Pardee, Mineral County
- Perma, Sanders County
- Pioneer, Beaverhead County
- Pioneer, Powell County
- Pony, Madison County
- Princeton, Granite County
- Quartz, Mineral County
- Quietus, Big Horn County
- Red Bluff, Madison County
- Red Lion, Granite County
- Rimini, Lewis and Clark County
- Rimrock, Yellowstone County
- Ringling, Meagher County
- Rockvale, Carbon County
- Ruby, Madison County
- Ruby Gulch, Phillips County
- Silesia, Carbon County
- Silver Bow, Silver Bow County
- Sixteen, Meagher County
- Southern Cross, Deer Lodge County
- Square Butte, Chouteau County
- Stark, Missoula County
- Storrs, Gallatin County
- Sumatra, Rosebud County
- Taft, Mineral County
- Thoeny, Valley County
- Tower, Granite County
- Trapper City, Beaverhead County
- Trident, Gallatin County
- Vananda, Rosebud County
- Vandalia, Valley County
- Virginia City, Madison County
- Wagner, Phillips County
- Washoe, Carbon County
- Wheat Basin, Stillwater County
- Wickes, Lewis and Clark County
- Yellowstone City, Park County
- Zortman, Phillips County

== See also ==
- History of Montana
  - Timeline of Montana history
    - Timeline of pre-statehood Montana history
- List of cities and towns in Montana
- List of counties in Montana
- List of places in Montana
- Outline of Montana
