= Hinsdale, Montana =

Community in Montana, United States

- Census-designated place & Unincorporated community
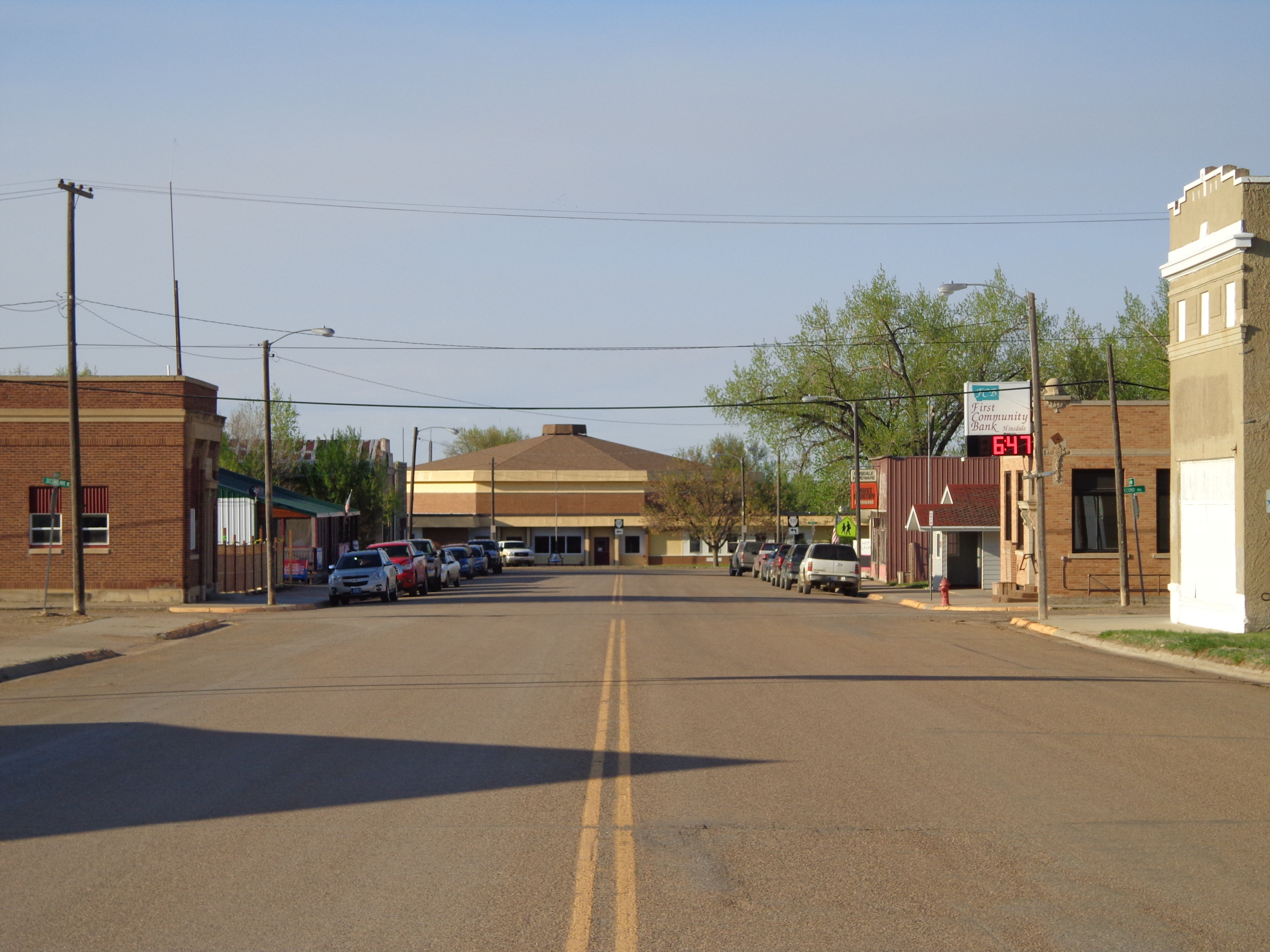
- Montana Street looking North from Highway 2
- Nickname: "The Best Little Town in the Milk River Valley"
- Location within Montana Location within the United States
- Coordinates: 48°24′13″N 107°03′30″W
- Country: United States
- State: Montana
- County: Valley

Government
  - Type: Unincorporated

Area
  - Total: 6.66 sq mi (17.25 km^{2})
  - Land: 6.47 sq mi (16.75 km^{2})
  - Water: 0.19 sq mi (0.50 km^{2})
- Elevation: 2,126 ft (648 m)

Population (2020)
  - Total: 193
  - Density: 29.9/sq mi (11.53/km^{2})
- Time zone: UTC-7 (Mountain (MST))
  - Summer (DST): UTC-6 (MDT)
- ZIP code: 59241
- Area code: 406
- GNIS feature ID: 2583816

Hinsdale is an unincorporated community and census-designated place in Valley County, Montana, United States. As of the 2020 census, Hinsdale had a population of 193. The community is located on the Milk River and U.S. Route 2, with Montana Highway 537 headed north out of town and South Bench Road crossing the railroad tracks and running south of town. Hinsdale has a post office with ZIP code 59241.

== Communities and ghost towns ==
There are smaller communities and ghost towns left over from the Homestead Period that fall under the Hinsdale community.

- Barr
- Beaverton
- Genevieve
- Happy Flats
- Miles Crossing
- Tampico
- Vandalia
- Thoeny

== History ==
Native American tribes lived in the local area for thousands of years before European colonization. This colonization brought horses which greatly improved life on the prairie. The steady eastward march of settlers pushed new tribes into the area.

=== 1800s ===
The Corps of Discovery reached the head of the Milk River in May 1805. There, the river received its name, for "the water of this river possesses a peculiar whiteness, being about the colour of a cup of tea with the admixture of a tablespoonfull of milk."

After the Corps of Discovery, the next major event in the area was the arrival of Texas cattle coming to fatten up on the local grass after their long cattle drives. The cattle drives lasted from 1866 until the late 1880s.

The area was used and claimed by various Native American Tribes. The Act of May 1, 1888 ceded a large area of land, including Hinsdale, from the tribes and opened the area up to homesteading

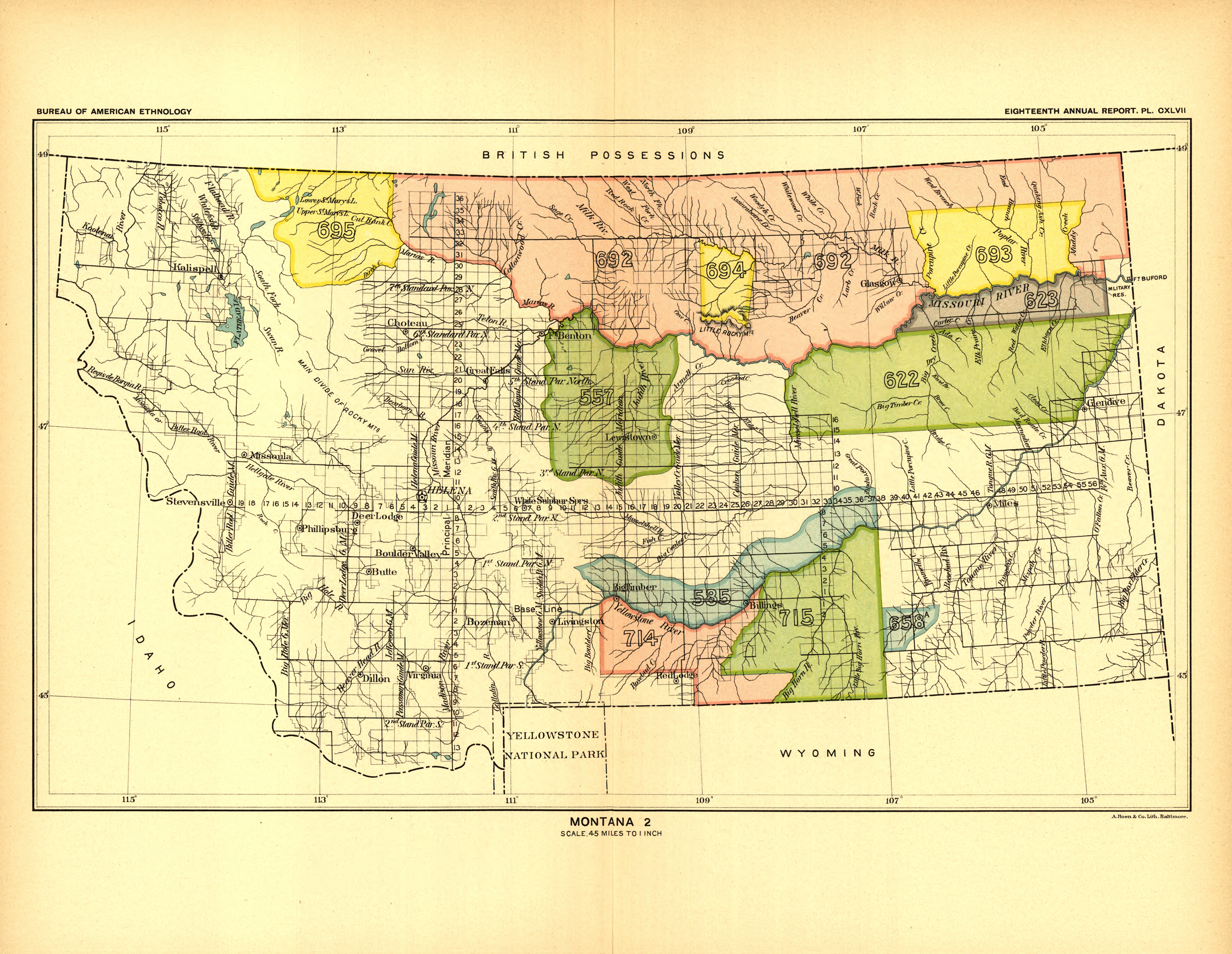
Eighteenth Annual Report of the Bureau of American Ethnology to the Secretary of the Smithsonian Institution, 1896-1897. Indian Land Cessions in the United States,1784-1894. Montana, Map 2

Hinsdale was created when the railroad came through. A post office was established in 1891. The area became populated with homesteaders seeking farm ground in the newly opened land The original site, or Old Hinsdale, was located roughly one and a half miles east of the present town site. The old site was once owned by Bob Walsh, aka "Six-shooter Bob." The present town site was originally owned by William Woolridge, who was the depot agent in 1897.

The first schoolhouse in the community was built by James Deegan and Los Blackmon near the old Deegan ranch. The first schoolhouse in new Hinsdale, a log building, was located on the current school grounds.

=== 1900s ===
Hinsdale has had two newspapers in the past. The Montana Homestead ran from 1904-1912 The better known Hinsdale Tribune ran from 1912-1971. The Hinsdale Tribune merged with The Saco Independent to form the Independent Tribune for a few years in the 1970s.

While the rest of the country was booming in the Roaring Twenties, Montana was in a drought. Montana was the only state in the union to have a decrease in population during that time. Though far removed from the center of the Dust Bowl, Hinsdale did see a few dust storms during the Great Depression. Times were tough and most of the settlers who toughed it out and stayed lived mostly by subsistence farming.

The 1980s was a tough time in agriculture across the country. The community of Hinsdale suffered greatly as the period saw one of the worst droughts in the areas history.

=== 2000s ===
The second decade of the 21st century has seen unusual and record breaking weather for Hinsdale. During the winter of 2010–2011, more than 105 inches (2,700 mm) fell in neighboring Glasgow. This led to severe flooding in the spring due to runoff. A second flood period occurred later in the spring as the soil was saturated and all of the water once again rushed into the streams and the Milk River.

The summer of 2014 was unusually wet. After several weeks of small, scattered rainstorms, a larger system rolled through in late August. The storm dropped several inches of rain as it made its way across Montana. Hinsdale received seven inches rain over a three-day period. This induced the third hundred‑year‑flood that Hinsdale had experienced in three years.

== Demographics ==
Historical population
Census	Pop.	Note	%±
2020	193		—
U.S. Decennial Census

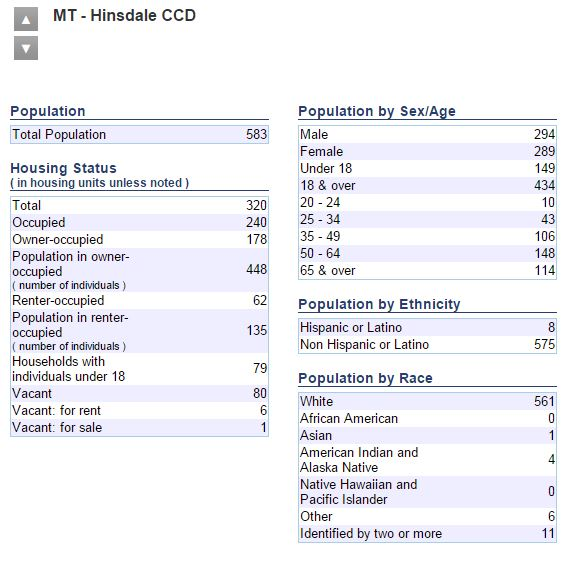
Hinsdale Demographics, 2010 U.S. Census

As of the 2010 Census, there were 583 people and 240 occupied homes in the Hinsdale CCD. There were 294 males and 289 females. The largest age group was ages 50–64 with 148 individuals.

=== Population Census ===
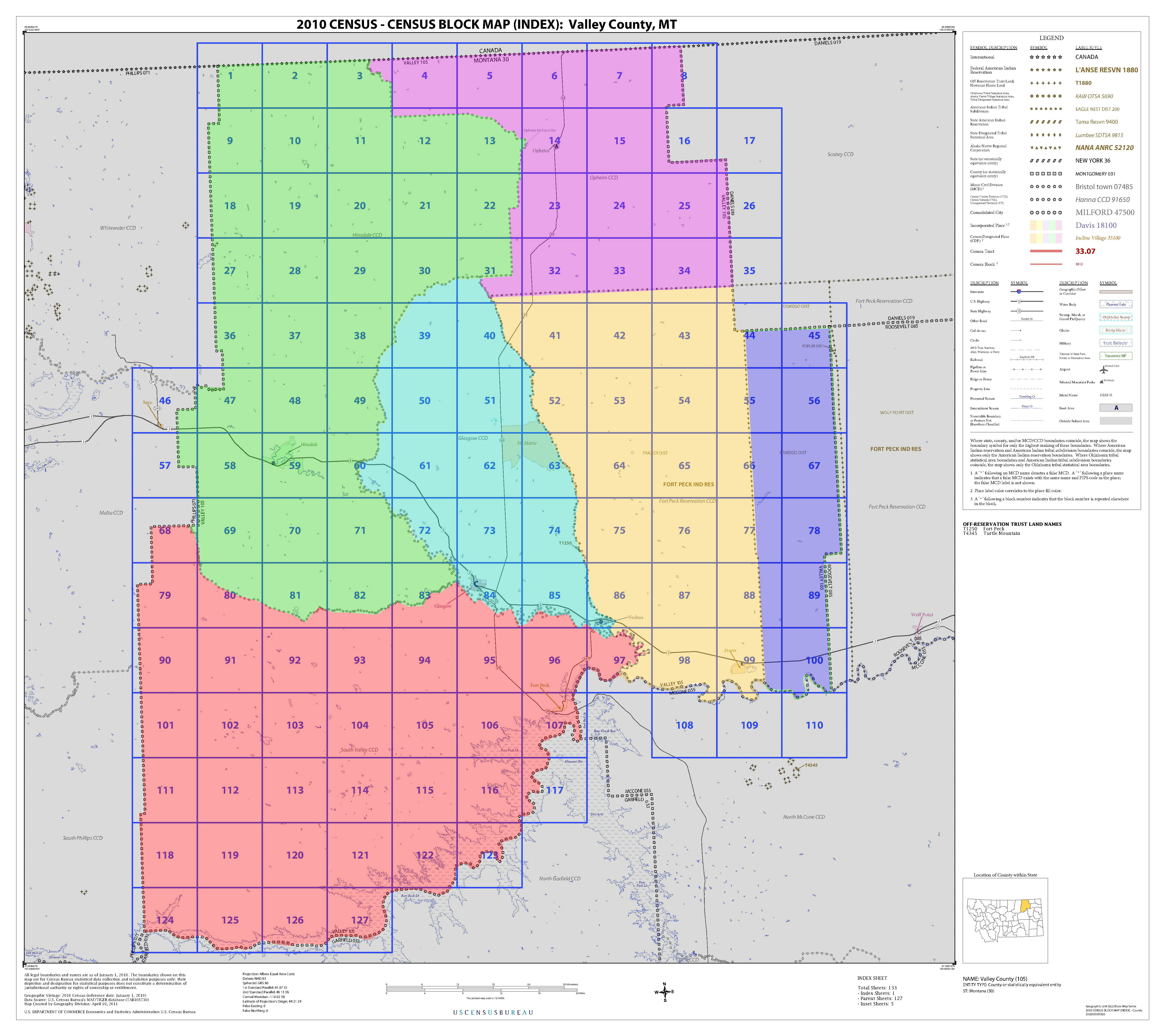
Valley County Census Districts, colored, 2010 U.S. Census

Valley County Census Districts 1940

Census Year	Hinsdale CCD	Hinsdale Rural	Larb Creek	South Bench	Notes
2010	583	-	-	-	Hinsdale CDP added(217)
2000	609	-	-	-	-
1990	704	-	-	-	-
1980	786	-	-	-	-
1970	897	-	-	-	-
1960	1,207	-	-	-	+Beaverton
1950	520	285	35	20	-
1940	600	334	38	49	+Thoeny, Barnard, and Nott to Hinsdale Rural
1930	570	650	55	79	-
1920	550	900	100	50	-
1910	403	442	-	-	-

Hinsdale is the 7th CCD of Valley County and Hinsdale Rural was the 4th. Hinsdale was not a unique district in the 1900 U.S. Census, so there is no population data from that census. Since Hinsdale is not and never has been an incorporated town, neither the town or the community are easily defined. The census districts are one of the more accurate ways of defining the town and community. They also reflect how smaller communities in the area evaporated and the Hinsdale area grew despite a dwindling population in the 20th century.

Hinsdale All of the areas listed in the chart are CCDs, Census County Divisions. In 2010, the town of Hinsdale was created as a CDP, Census Designated place. This means that there are two population numbers for Hinsdale. The smaller is the population of the town (CDP) and the larger is the whole community, including the town (CCD).

== Geography and climate ==
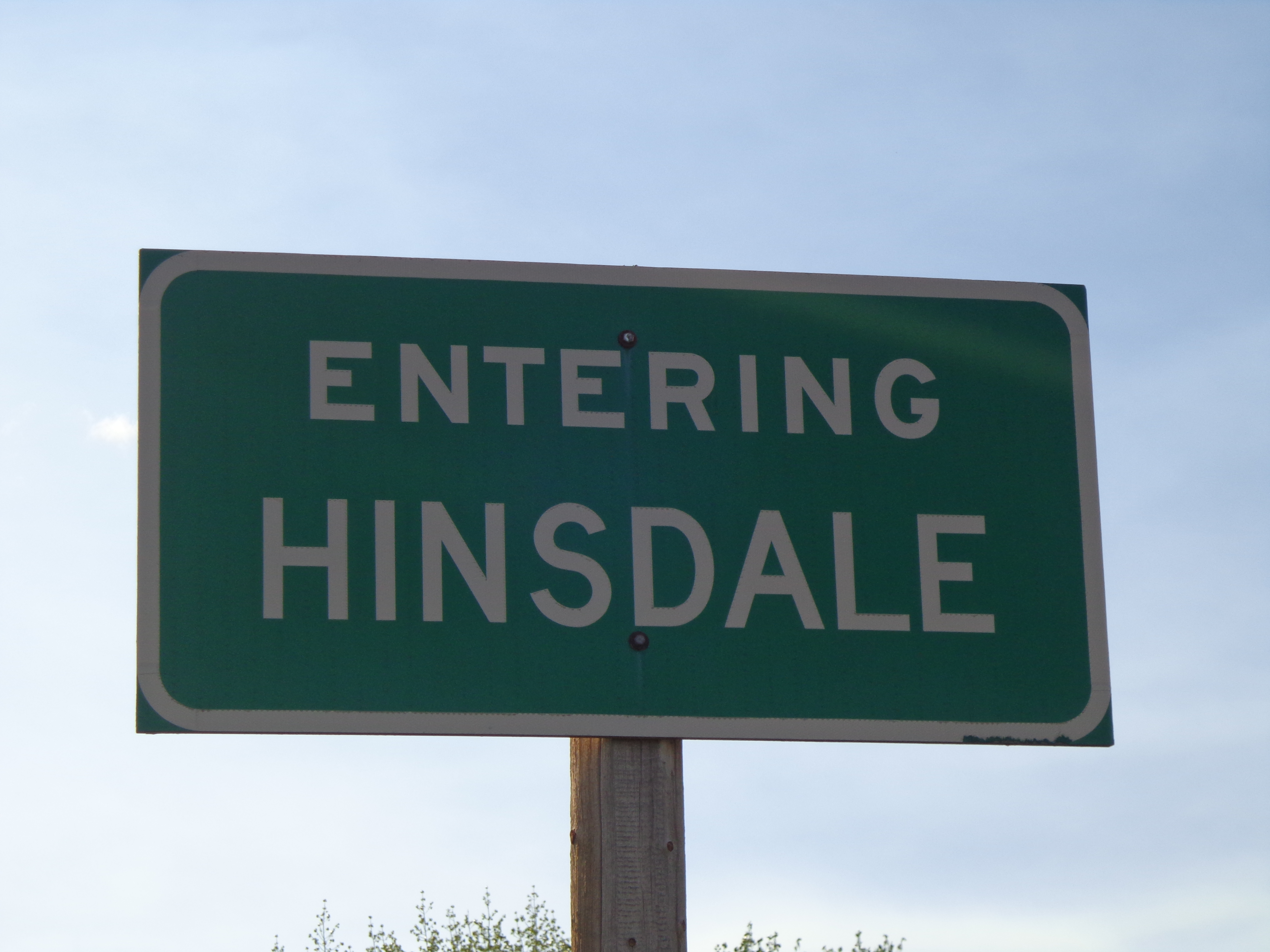
Entering Hinsdale Sign. Hinsdale, Montana

Hinsdale is located on the Milk River just above the flood plain. A cut bank separates the town from the county park on the river's edge. U.S. Highway 2 runs east and west on the south side of town, with the railroad tracks running parallel south of the highway. Just south of town is the south bench, with marks the edge of the terrace than makes up the majority of south Valley County. The terrace is a raised area that was not cut down as far by erosion compared to the Milk River Valley. Numerous soil horizons, including multiple layers of sandstone, are visible in the bench.

Hinsdale was once on the edge of the inland sea of North America. As the Rocky Mountains began to rise, they were eroded and sediment filled in the sea. as the Rocky Mountain Front continued to gain elevation and increase the slope of the land, water began to erode away the sediment that had been deposited. At this point, the Missouri River flowed north past Big Sandy, entered what is now the Milk River Valley, and flowed along its course past Hinsdale. Around what is now Poplar, the Missouri turned north and eventually flowed into the Hudson Bay.

During the last series of ice ages, the flow of the Missouri was diverted to its current riverbed. The Milk River now flows through part of the Missouri's ancient riverbed. The continental glaciers also deposited large amounts of rocks and sediment on the landscape.

According to the U.S. Census Bureau, the CDP has an area of 6.664 square miles (17.26 km^{2}), of which 6.469 square miles (16.75 km^{2}) is land and 0.195 square miles (0.51 km^{2}) is water.

=== Climate ===
According to the Köppen Climate Classification system, Hinsdale has a semi-arid climate, abbreviated "BSk" on climate maps.

Climate data for Hinsdale, Montana, 1991–2020 normals, extremes 1971–present
Month	Jan	Feb	Mar	Apr	May	Jun	Jul	Aug	Sep	Oct	Nov	Dec	Year
Record high °F (°C)	58 (14)	69 (21)	78 (26)	90 (32)	101 (38)	107 (42)	109 (43)	108 (42)	102 (39)	90 (32)	86 (30)	65 (18)	109 (43)
Mean maximum °F (°C)	47.6 (8.7)	49.4 (9.7)	63.3 (17.4)	76.4 (24.7)	85.3 (29.6)	92.8 (33.8)	97.3 (36.3)	98.7 (37.1)	91.5 (33.1)	77.6 (25.3)	61.6 (16.4)	47.6 (8.7)	100.8 (38.2)
Mean daily maximum °F (°C)	26.0 (−3.3)	29.2 (−1.6)	41.3 (5.2)	55.8 (13.2)	67.0 (19.4)	75.3 (24.1)	84.4 (29.1)	84.2 (29.0)	71.9 (22.2)	55.3 (12.9)	39.8 (4.3)	28.4 (−2.0)	54.9 (12.7)
Daily mean °F (°C)	15.9 (−8.9)	19.1 (−7.2)	30.2 (−1.0)	42.8 (6.0)	53.5 (11.9)	62.2 (16.8)	69.6 (20.9)	69.1 (20.6)	58.2 (14.6)	43.9 (6.6)	29.8 (−1.2)	18.9 (−7.3)	42.8 (6.0)
Mean daily minimum °F (°C)	5.8 (−14.6)	9.1 (−12.7)	19.1 (−7.2)	29.8 (−1.2)	40.0 (4.4)	49.1 (9.5)	54.9 (12.7)	54.1 (12.3)	44.5 (6.9)	32.4 (0.2)	19.8 (−6.8)	9.3 (−12.6)	30.7 (−0.8)
Mean minimum °F (°C)	−18.8 (−28.2)	−9.6 (−23.1)	−2.3 (−19.1)	16.6 (−8.6)	27.8 (−2.3)	40.2 (4.6)	47.6 (8.7)	44.9 (7.2)	31.6 (−0.2)	16.6 (−8.6)	−0.2 (−17.9)	−11.7 (−24.3)	−23.2 (−30.7)
Record low °F (°C)	−33 (−36)	−34 (−37)	−25 (−32)	−3 (−19)	18 (−8)	31 (−1)	39 (4)	37 (3)	20 (−7)	−4 (−20)	−25 (−32)	−37 (−38)	−37 (−38)
Average precipitation inches (mm)	0.52 (13)	0.36 (9.1)	0.77 (20)	1.49 (38)	2.79 (71)	3.60 (91)	1.84 (47)	1.11 (28)	1.51 (38)	1.25 (32)	0.60 (15)	0.49 (12)	16.33 (414.1)
Average precipitation days (≥ 0.01 in)	5.6	4.2	5.6	6.3	8.2	10.5	6.8	5.5	5.3	5.1	4.8	4.8	72.7
Source 1: NOAA
Source 2: National Weather Service

== Schools ==
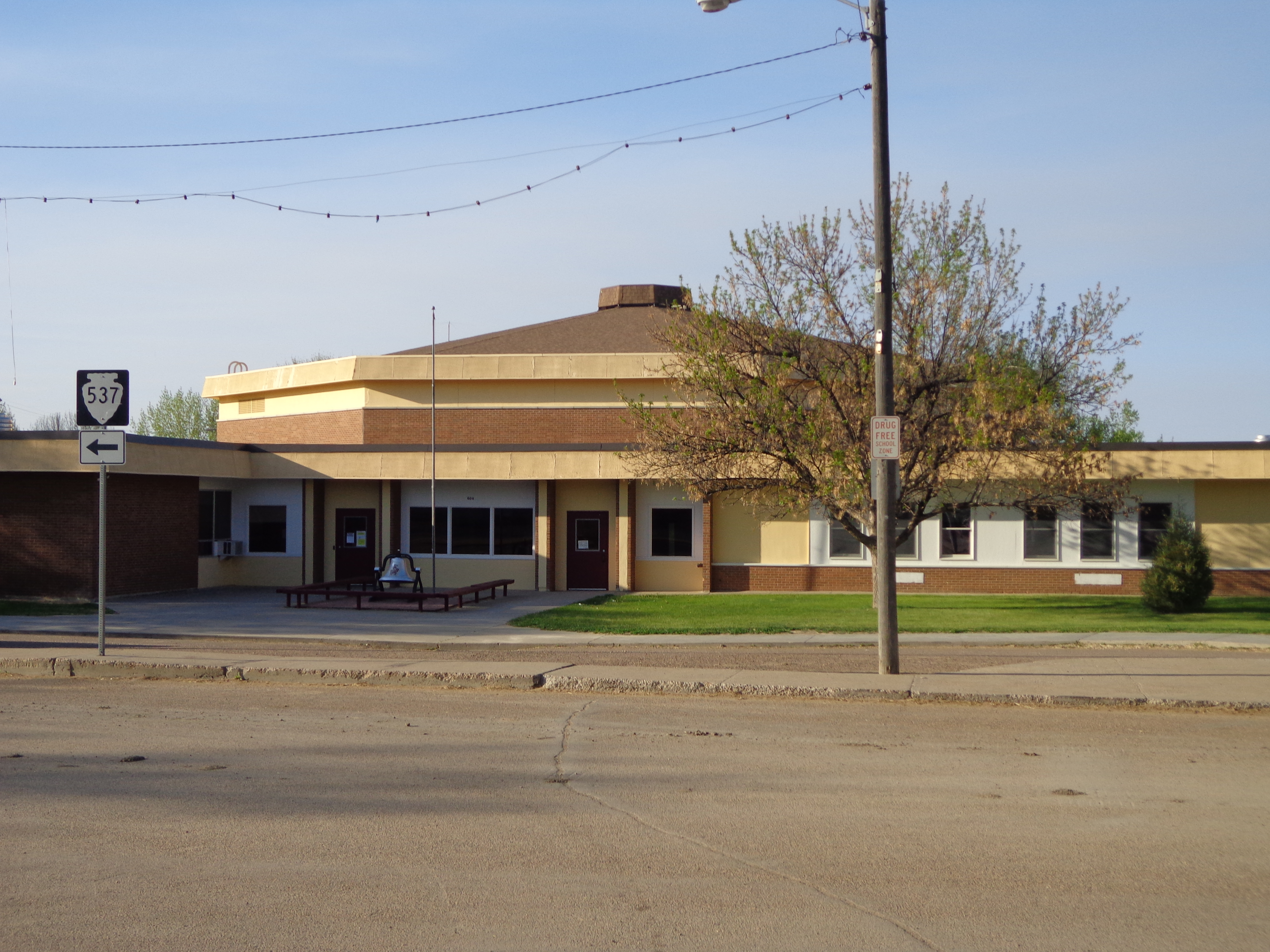
Hinsdale Public Schools

Hinsdale Public Schools teaches grades K-12, serving elementary, middle school, and high school. The school district is District No. 7C in Valley County. The Hinsdale Public School District is one of the other employers in the community, supply many teaching and support positions. This is a K-12 class C school. The Hinsdale School has two wings, one for the high school and one for the elementary. The two wings are joined by the administration offices and the cafeteria. The two wings form an L-shape and the octagonal-shaped gymnasium occupies the inside angle of the high school and elementary. The school mascot is the Raider and the school colors are maroon and white. The high school offers track and field on its own, basketball and volleyball through the North Country Mavericks co-op with Saco and Whitewater, and football through the co-op with Glasgow.

== Business and industry ==
The main employment of Hinsdale is agriculture. Most farms and ranches in Hinsdale are family owned and generational, in that they are passed from one generation to the next. Most of these operations were founded when the area was opened up to homesteading. Some, such as the Canen Ranch and McColly Ranch, have celebrated over 100 years of operation. Some of the primary commodities produced in the area include beef cattle, hard red wheats, and forages.

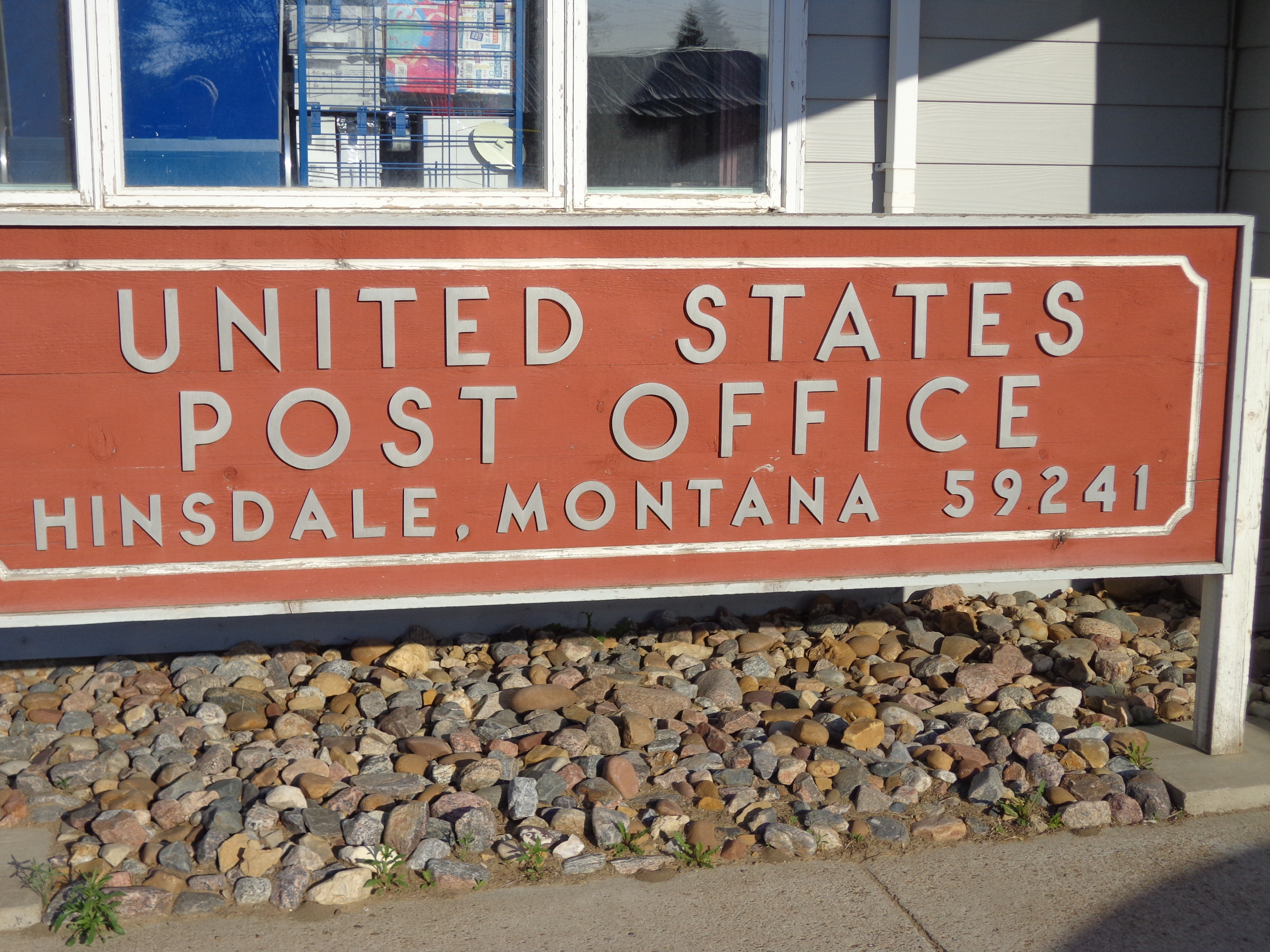
Post Office Sign for Hinsdale, Montana

The community is also supported by a First Community Bank branch, Post Office, bar and cafe, pottery shop, ice cream shop, gunsmith, leathersmith, beauty parlor, gas station and convenience store, and other small businesses.

== Transportation ==
Amtrak’s Empire Builder, which operates between Seattle/Portland and Chicago, passes through the town on BNSF tracks, but makes no stop. The nearest station is located in Glasgow, 29 miles (47 km) to the southeast.

== Community ==
Hinsdale hosts an Independence Day celebration every year over the 3rd and 4 July. This event, known as Milk River Days, began as a bicentennial celebration in 1976. The two-day event boasts a rodeo, street dance, parade, picnic, fireworks, and many other activities. There is also an All School Reunion every five years (on years ending in 6 and 1) for the alumni of Hinsdale High School.

Belly Bump is a basketball tournament for the alumni of Hinsdale High School. Belly Bump was founded by Kurt Rosendale in 1978. Mike Jones continued the tradition from the 1980s through the mid‑1990s. Jared Albus organized the tournament until 2000. The tournament did not take place for over a decade until Levi Capdeville and Nate Remmich revived the tradition in 2013.
