= Beaverton, Montana =

Unincorporated community in Montana, U.S.

Coordinates: 48°25′25″N 107°15′14″W

Beaverton is an unincorporated community in Valley County, Montana, United States, located near Beaver Creek on the Valley County/Phillips County line. The community itself is all but a ghost town, with First Creek Seeds being the only remaining feature. Beaverton is halfway between the town of Saco and the community of Hinsdale.

Year	Population
1920	149
1930	129
1940	87
1950	86

1950 is the last year Beaverton was included as its own district in the U.S. Census.

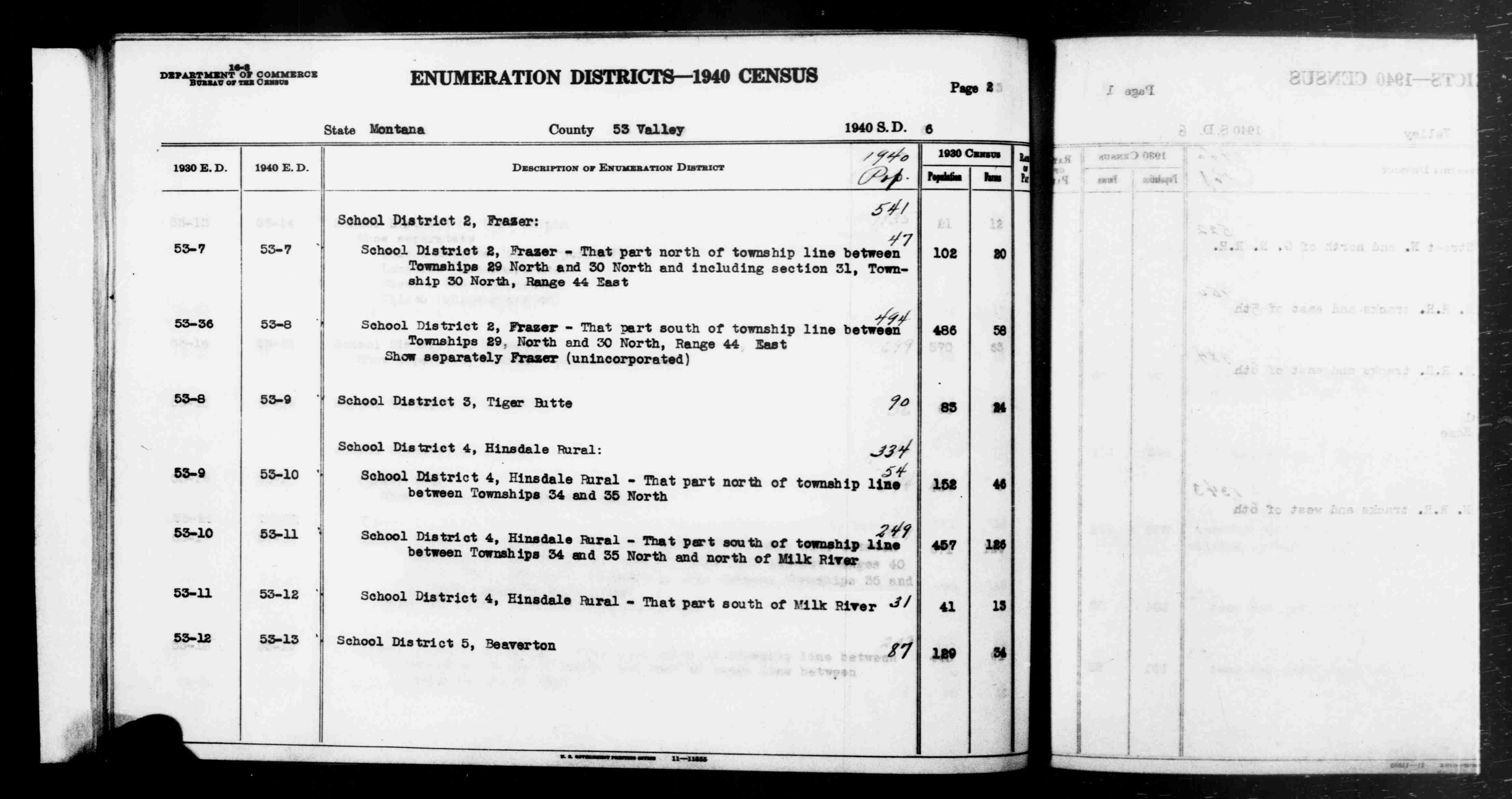
Beaverton District in the 1940 U.S. Census

== Transportation ==
Amtrak’s Empire Builder, which operates between Seattle/Portland and Chicago, passes through the small town on BNSF tracks, but makes no stop. The nearest stations are located in Malta, 34 miles (55 km) to the west, and Glasgow, 40 miles (64 km) to the southeast.
