= Wolf Point (disambiguation) =

Wolf Point is an incorporated town in Roosevelt County, Montana.

Wolf Point may also refer to

- Wolf Point (Amtrak station), Wolf Point, Montana
- Wolf Point, Chicago, the confluence of three branches of the Chicago River

== See also ==
- Wolf Point Airport
