= Coloma, Montana =

- Ghost town
- Location within Montana Location within the United States
- Coordinates: 46°50′35″N 113°22′50″W
- Country: United States
- State: Montana
- County: Missoula
- Established: 1893
- Abandoned: 1930s
- Elevation: 5,928 ft (1,807 m)

Coloma is a ghost town located in the area of the Garnet Range in Missoula County, Montana, United States. Little is known about the settlement, which appears to have been founded in 1893. Records of the period indicate high gold mining activity from 1896 onwards, with an estimated $200,000 to $250,000 in gold being extracted. In 1916, there was additional activity when a mill was built on the site and additional surveys on the ore veins were conducted, apparently without success. Additional prospecting activity occurred between 1932 and 1950.

As of 2009, the site was under archeological study by Dr. Kelly Dixon and a group of graduate students from the University of Montana.

== See also ==
- Garnet, Montana
- Montana Ghost Town Preservation Society
