= Glentana, Montana =

- Unincorporated community
- Location within Montana Location within the United States
- Coordinates: 48°50′53″N 106°14′58″W
- Country: United States
- State: Montana
- County: Valley
- Elevation: 3,091 ft (942 m)
- Time zone: UTC-7 (Mountain (MST))
  - Summer (DST): UTC-6 (MDT)
- ZIP code: 59240
- Area code: 406
- GNIS feature ID: 771808

Glentana is an unincorporated community in Valley County, Montana, United States. Glentana is 7.2 miles (11.6 km) east of Opheim. The community had a post office until September 4, 2010; it still has its own ZIP code, 59240.

The Glentana post office opened in 1913 with William J. O’Connor as postmaster. During the summer of 1926, the whole town was moved nearer the Great Northern Railway’s branch line between Scobey and Opheim.
