= Thoeny =

Ghost town in Montana, United States

- Ghost town
- Location of Thoeny in Montana Thoeny (the United States)
- Coordinates: 48°52′37″N 106°55′03″W
- Country: United States
- State: Montana
- County: Valley
- Elevation: 2,480 ft (756 m)

Population (2010)
  - Total: 0
- GNIS feature ID: 777551

Thoeny is a ghost town in the northern part of Valley County, Montana, United States, near the Canadian province of Saskatchewan. Thoeny is located north of Hinsdale and west of Opheim near the banks of Rock Creek. The school house still stands. There is also a cemetery located on the hill.

== History ==
Thoeny was named for its first postmaster, Jacob Thoeny, in 1915. By 1918, the community had two general stores, a newspaper, a blacksmith shop, and several other businesses, all without the benefit of being located near a railroad. A schoolhouse, a cemetery and a few foundations are reminders of the community.

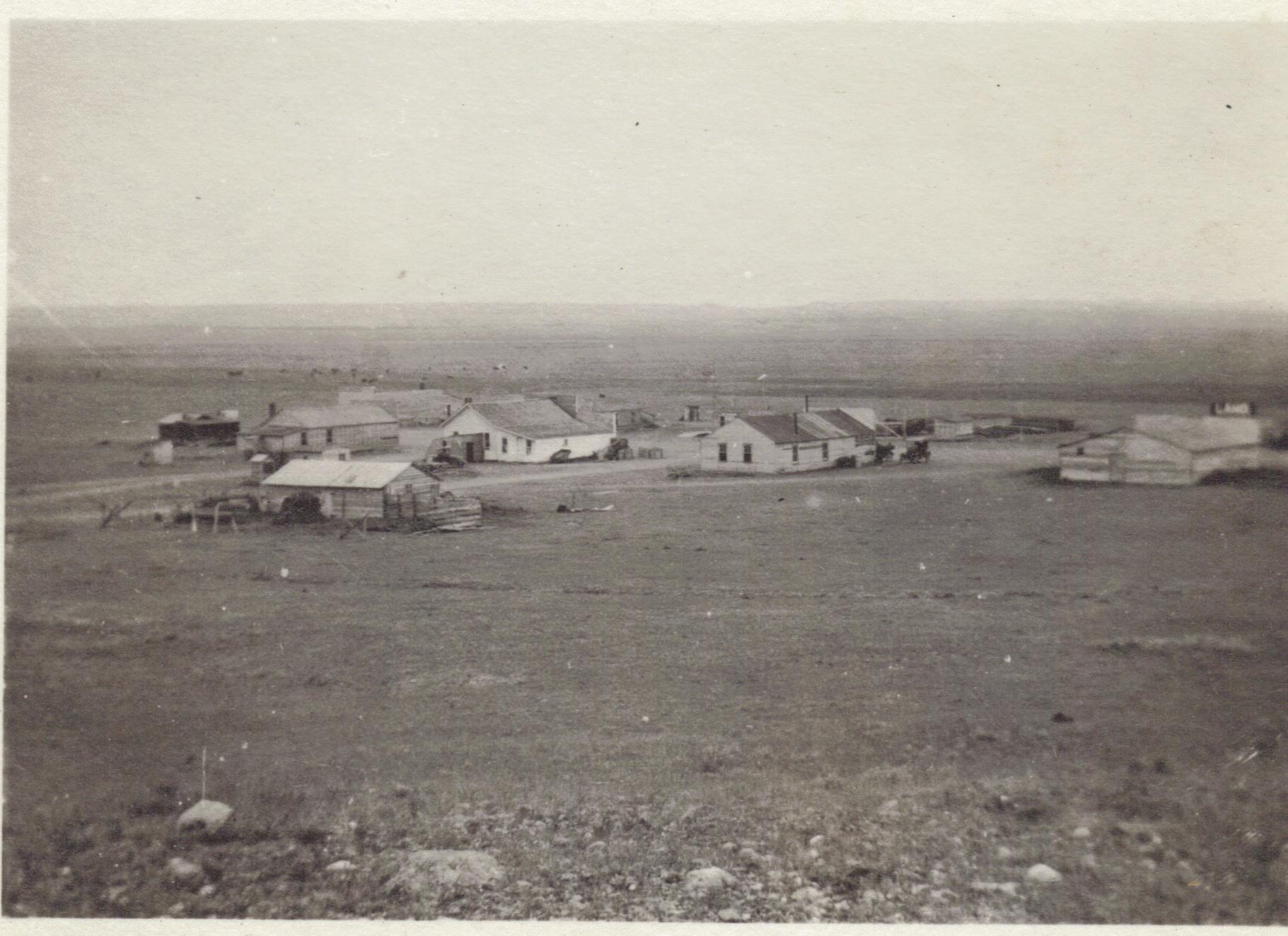
Thoeny, Montana July 1919

== Population ==
| Year | Population |
|---|---|
| 1920 | 317 |
| 1930 | 127 |

The census district named Barnard was seceded from Thoeny and had a population of 76 in 1930. Thoeny became part of the Hinsdale Rural CCD in the 1940 Census, along with Barnard and Nott.
