= Richland, Montana =

- Unincorporated community
- Location within Montana Location within the United States
- Coordinates: 48°49′15″N 106°03′04″W
- Country: United States
- State: Montana
- County: Valley
- Elevation: 2,700 ft (820 m)
- Time zone: UTC-7 (Mountain (MST))
  - Summer (DST): UTC-6 (MDT)
- ZIP code: 59260
- Area code: 406
- GNIS feature ID: 775751

Richland is an unincorporated community in Valley County, Montana, United States. Richland is located in northeast Valley County near the Daniels County line. The community has a post office with ZIP code 59260.

The town had a post office from 1913 to 1919. In 1926, Richland moved about 15 miles southeast to a location along a branch line of the Great Northern Railway that extended from Flaxville to Opheim.
