= KLTZ =

- Glasgow, Montana; United States
- Frequency: 1240 kHz

Programming
- Format: Country

Ownership
- Owner: Tim Phillips; (Glasgow Media Group, LLC)
- Sister stations: KLAN

History
- First air date: 1954
- Call sign meaning: chosen for "Scottish" theme (kilts)

Technical information
- Licensing authority: FCC
- Facility ID: 24243
- Class: C
- Power: 1,000 watts
- Transmitter coordinates: 48°13′6″N 106°38′43″W
- Translators: K273DB (102.5 MHz, Glasgow)

Links
- Public license information: Public file; LMS
- Website: www.kltz.com

KLTZ (1240 AM) is a radio station licensed to serve Glasgow, Montana. The station is owned by Tim Phillips, through licensee Glasgow Media Group, LLC. It airs a country music format. The talk show Live Under the Big Sky airs every Tuesday, Wednesday and Thursday from 9 am to 10 am. The show is hosted by Stan Ozark.

It and its sister station, KLAN (93.5 FM, "Mix 93"), are managed by Tim Phillips, who also serves as the Program Director. Production staff includes Program Director/General Manager Tim Phillips, News and Sports Director Stan "Boomer" Ozark, Leila Seyfert, Maxwell Knodel, and Keirsten Wethern. Gwen Page serves as the Traffic Manager and Receptionist; Georgie Kulczyk serves as the Office Manager.

== History ==
Founded in 1954 by W.L. "Bill" Holter.
