= Lustre, Montana =

Unincorporated community in Montana, U.S.

Coordinates: 48°23′36″N 105°52′56″W

Lustre is an unincorporated community in Valley County, Montana, United States. The area population of Lustre is about 200.

Lustre is surrounded by wheat fields and cattle ranches. Agriculture is the primary occupation in the region. Lustre Christian High School has an annual feast and auction called Schmeckfest.

== History ==
Lustre was founded in the early 1900s primarily by Mennonite families who homesteaded the area located on the Fort Peck Indian Reservation. The community of modern-day Lustre consists of two churches and two schools.

The Lustre Mennonite Brethren Church was established in 1917 about the same time as the Evangelical Mennonite Brethren Church. Both churches serve the needs of the local community and they often do worship services, camp ministry, and service projects together. Working together, both churches support an active AWANA ministry as well as Beacon Bible Camp ministry. Both churches are Evangelical and are faithful in their preaching and proclamation of the Gospel Message.

A post office called Lustre was established in 1917, and remained in operation until 1959.

The community's name was selected on account of its euphonic sound.

== Climate ==
The summer days are long and warm and the winter days are cold, windy and short. Lustre tends to have above average wind. There is very little moisture in the air so Lustre rarely gets wet heavy snow in the winter months. The spring months are filled with planting crops, planting gardens and seeing new calves being born. The summer months are filled with haying, harvesting and short vacations. Fall months are filled with crop and garden harvesting as well as back to school activities. Winter months are filled with sports games, AWANA ministry, family vacations and many hours visiting friends and neighbors.

== Education ==
The two schools are an elementary school and a high school. The elementary school is a public school K-8 and the High School is a private Christian High School and boarding school for those who come from other cities, states and nations. The elementary school has both boys and girls, jamboree and junior high, basketball teams. Lustre Christian High School is certified with ACSI and has volleyball, basketball, and track teams. They are known as the Lustre Lions.
