= Genevieve, Montana =

Genevieve
- Unincorporated community
- Location in Montana Genevieve (the United States)
- Coordinates: 48°43′38″N 107°09′45″W
- Country: United States
- State: Montana
- County: Valley
- Time zone: Mountain (MST)
  - Summer (DST): MDT
- ZIP code: 59241
- Area code: 406

Genevieve is a ghost town in Valley County, Montana, United States, located north of Hinsdale. The only structure is the Genevieve Community Hall, which area residents still maintain. The Hall was constructed in 1922. (Note: Available through Newspaper Archive at the Wikipedia Library)
