= Wheat Basin, Montana =

- Ghost town
- Location within Montana Location within the United States
- Coordinates: 45°55′02″N 109°03′46″W
- Country: United States
- State: Montana
- County: Stillwater
- Elevation: 3,947 ft (1,203 m)

Population (2010)
  - Total: 0
- Time zone: UTC-7 (Mountain (MST))
  - Summer (DST): UTC-6 (MDT)
- ZIP code: 59057
- Area code: 406
- GNIS feature ID: 778337

Wheat Basin is a ghost town in Stillwater County, Montana, United States. The town has a total area of 6.5 acres (2.6 hectares).

== History ==
In 1915, four years before John Stolte platted Wheat Basin, the town of Nora grew up from a railroad construction camp midway between the towns of Rapelje and Molt near the mouth of Big Lake.

By the summer of 1917, the railroad had been completed, the Riopel family had opened a mercantile store there and the postal service in Washington, D.C. changed Nora's name to Wheat Basin in 1918. The town supported a developed main street with a grain elevator, a bank, stores, a dance hall and lumber yards. A post office was open in 1918 with Frances Riopel serving as postmaster; it remained in operation until 1936. The town was primarily an agricultural community with a stop and depot. The Wheat basin post office was closed in 1936. The railroad later pulled out and the town descended into steep decline.

In 1937, the town was gripped by a bloody double homicide committed by Frank Robideau. The murder victims were Michael and Frieda Kuntz, who ran the "Occidental Grain Elevator." Robideau was quickly tried and hanged.

Today, Wheat Basin is a ghost town, with little remaining that is easily visible except a number of concrete building foundations and depressions where buildings once stood. The streets and main road are also still present. The last surviving structure was the Grain Elevator, which burned down in 1997. A sign placard indicates the site of the former town.

The town was purchased in 2006 by Ken Mesch. Only two shops are owned by the previous owners of the blacksmith shop.
