= Vandalia, Montana =

- Unincorporated community
- Location within the state of Montana
- Coordinates: 48°21′16″N 106°54′34″W
- Country: United States
- State: Montana
- County: Valley
- Time zone: UTC-7 (Mountain (MST))
  - Summer (DST): UTC-6 (MDT)
- ZIP code: 59273
- Area code: 406

Vandalia is a small unincorporated community in Valley County, Montana, United States. It was established in 1904 with a post office and a store along the Hi-Line of the Great Northern Railway. The community's chief industry was the manufacture of bricks that were used in public buildings across Montana. Vandalia also shares its namesake with a local dam on the Milk River that diverts water for the Glasgow Irrigation District.

== Climate ==
According to the Köppen Climate Classification system, Vandalia has a semi-arid climate, abbreviated "BSk" on climate maps.

== Population ==
Year	Population
1920	100
1930	150
1940	73
1950	66

== Transportation ==
Amtrak’s Empire Builder, which operates between Seattle/Portland and Chicago, passes through the small town on BNSF tracks, but makes no stop. The nearest station is located in Glasgow, 17 miles (27 km) to the southeast.
