= KLAN (FM) =

- Glasgow, Montana; United States
- Frequency: 93.5 MHz
- Branding: Mix 93

Programming
- Format: Hot adult contemporary
- Affiliations: ABC News Radio

Ownership
- Owner: Tim Phillips; (Glasgow Media Group, LLC)
- Sister stations: KLTZ

History
- First air date: March 1, 1983

Technical information
- Licensing authority: FCC
- Facility ID: 70633
- Class: A
- ERP: 3,000 watts
- HAAT: 91 meters (299 feet)
- Transmitter coordinates: 48°05′42″N 106°37′08″W

Links
- Public license information: Public file; LMS
- Webcast: Listen Live
- Website: kltz.com

KLAN (93.5 MHz, "Mix 93") is an FM radio station licensed to serve Glasgow, Montana. The station, owned by Tim Phillips, through licensee Glasgow Media Group, LLC, airs the Rick Dees Weekly Top 40 every Sunday. It airs a hot adult contemporary music format.

The station was assigned the KLAN call sign by the Federal Communications Commission on March 2, 1983.

It and its sister station, KLTZ (1240 AM), are managed by Tim Phillips, who also serves as the Program Director. Production staff includes Program Director/General Manager Tim Phillips, News and Sports Director Stan "Boomer" Ozark, Leila Seyfert, Maxwell Knodel, and Keirsten Wethern. Gwen Page serves as the Traffic Manager and Receptionist; Georgie Kulczyk serves as the Office Manager.
