= Aldridge, Montana =

Aldridge
- Ghost town
- Location within Montana Location within the United States
- Coordinates: 45°05′13″N 110°49′18″W
- Country: United States
- State: Montana
- County: Park
- Established: 1901
- Abandoned: 1910
- Named for: W. H. Aldridge
- Elevation: 6,427 ft (1,959 m)
- GNIS feature ID: 778935

Aldridge is a ghost town in Park County, Montana, United States. According to the book Ghost Towns of the Montana Prairie, the town was incorporated as Aldridge in 1906 but was earlier named Horr, and later Electric. Aldridge was a mining town that supplied coke and coal to the smelters for the Anaconda Copper Mining Company. Aldridge is located two miles (3.2 km) north of the northern entrance to Yellowstone National Park.

== History ==
According to an insert in the Park County News, the story of Aldridge begins when Major Horr discovered five coal veins on a side hill near Cinnabar in 1872. In 1882, Major Horr and his two sons formed the Horr Coal Company. After the company was passed down to his sons it was sold to H.F. Blake and the Horr Coal Company became the Park Coal Company. During Blake's control of the company iron ore ovens were erected to expand the company. In 1889, J.H. Conrad became the manager of the company. By this time, 50 tons of coal and iron ore were produced daily to be sent to the Anaconda Copper Mining Company smelters in Butte, East Helena, Great Falls, and Anaconda. In 1894 the Park Coal Company was sold to entrepreneurs from New Jersey who turned it into the Montana Coal Company. Under the management of Ware B. Gay, the Montana Coal Company was employing 400 men, and it became the largest producing iron ore company in the western United States. Prospectors from the Montana Coal Company explored the nearby area of Horr and in 1892 discovered a rich coal vein near the Lake (later renamed Aldridge Lake). By June 1895, much of the mining activity near Horr started moving toward the lake where the "Camp at the Lake" was formed. In November, 200 men marched from the mines at Lake to the Montana Coal Company office in Horr to demand higher wages. The Montana Coal Company sent W.H. Aldridge from Helena to break the strike. After the strike was over (with the help of Mr. Aldridge) the mining camp was renamed Aldridge. With the completion of a conveyor from the mines at Aldridge to the iron ore ovens at Horr the Aldridge mines produced 300 to 500 tons of iron ore daily. With this, in 1897 the mines at Horr were abandoned and all mining operations were focused at Aldridge.

The Aldridge mines were safe compared to other mines in the area. In the mine's operation history there was only one recorded accident on the site. According to the Anaconda Standard, on August 2, 1901 Thomas W. Thomas lost his life in the mine. Thomas was killed by an explosion. The cause of the explosion was never determined but could have been caused by explosive gas or an unexploded blast.

In 1901 the Montana Coal and Coke Company was operating at maximum capacity in Aldridge. They employed over 500 men and shipped out over 650 train cars of coke per day. All the coal was mined on the 3,000 acres (1,214.1 hectares) of land surrounding Aldridge, but in August 1904 the miners went on strike. This strike lasted a year and crippled the local economy. The company recovered but never returned to its past glory.

Prior to 1904, an electric plant was built in Horr to supply the Montana Coal Company's mines and businesses with electricity. In 1904, Horr was renamed Electric because of the power plant built on the town site. With no mines operating in Electric, its economy survived by transporting iron ore to the smelters from its railhead.

In 1906, with popular community support, Aldridge absorbed Electric and incorporated. Local newspapers predicted that Aldridge would become one of the most important coal and iron ore mining camps in the country. Although Aldridge had a bright future, the Montana Coal Company defaulted in payments of bonds in 1910. The default led to a suit with the company and the bondholders. The bondholders won the suit and the Montana Coal and Coke Company was sentenced to pay over 100,000 dollars. This debt led to the closure of all the mining operations in Aldridge. With the closure of the mines, Aldridge became a ghost town.

== Today ==
Today there is no active mining, but there is still an abundance of coal deposits in the area. Some of the buildings of Aldridge have been torn down or relocated, but the other buildings are in ruins.
