= Valley County, Montana =

County in Montana, United States

- County
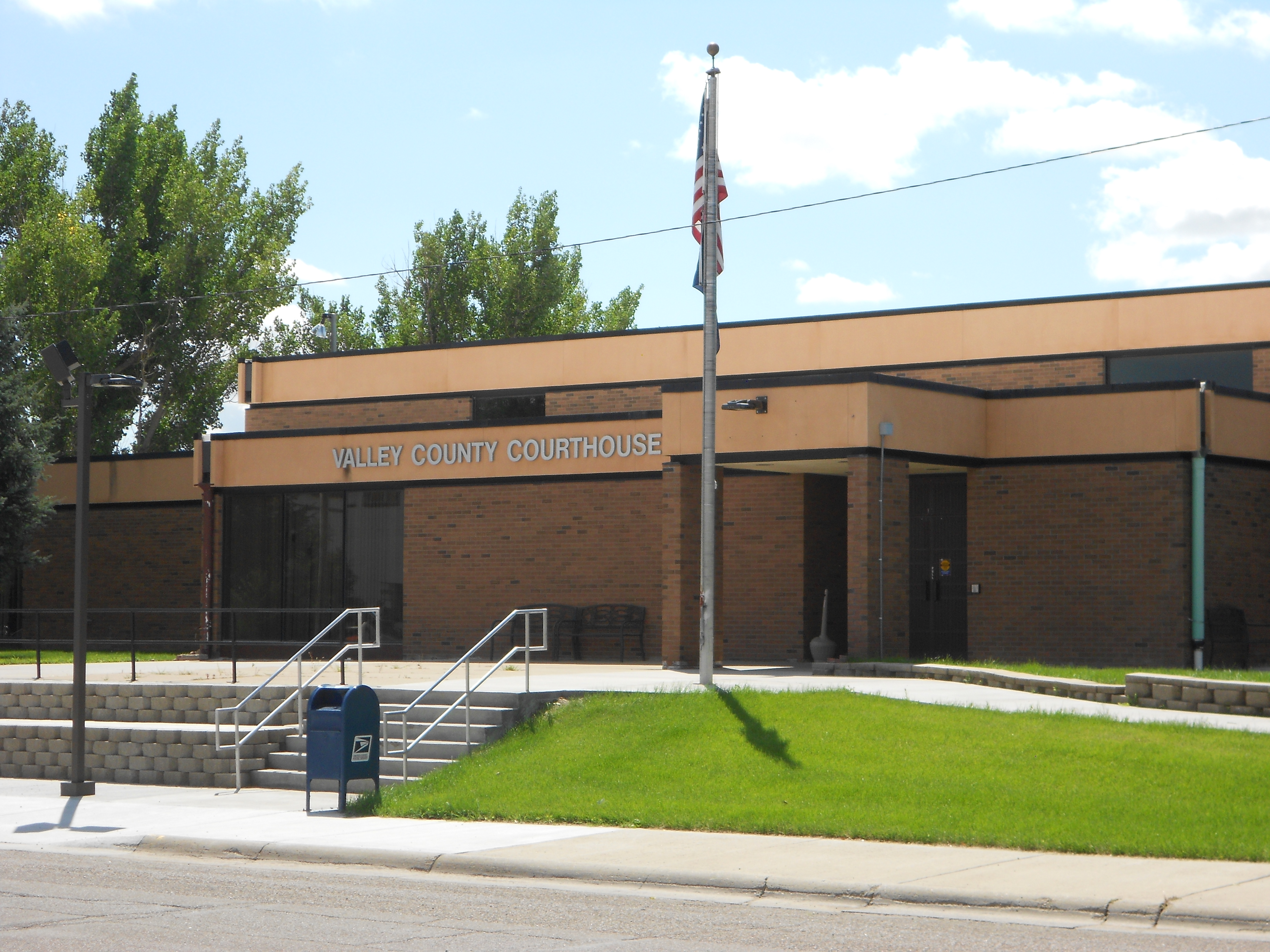
- Valley County Courthouse in Glasgow

- Location within the U.S. state of Montana
- Coordinates: 48°22′N 106°40′W
- Country: United States
- State: Montana
- Founded: 1893
- Seat: Glasgow
- Largest city: Glasgow

Area
  - Total: 5,062 sq mi (13,110 km^{2})
  - Land: 4,926 sq mi (12,760 km^{2})
  - Water: 136 sq mi (350 km^{2}) 2.7%

Population (2020)
  - Total: 7,578
  - Estimate (2025): 7,385 ▼
  - Density: 1.538/sq mi (0.5940/km^{2})
- Time zone: UTC−7 (Mountain)
  - Summer (DST): UTC−6 (MDT)
- Congressional district: 2nd
- Website: www.valleycountymt.gov
- Montana county number 20

Valley County is a county in the U.S. state of Montana. Valley County was created in 1893 with area partitioned from Dawson County. As of the 2020 census, the population was 7,578. Its county seat is Glasgow. It is located on the Canada–United States border with Saskatchewan.

== Geography ==
According to the United States Census Bureau, the county has a total area of 5,062 square miles (13,110 km^{2}), of which 4,926 square miles (12,760 km^{2}) is land and 136 square miles (350 km^{2}) (2.7%) is water. It is Montana's fourth-largest county by total area.

=== Transportation ===
==== Major highways ====
- U.S. Highway 2
- Montana Highway 24
- Montana Highway 42
- Montana Highway 117
- Montana Secondary Highway 248

==== Bus ====
Glasgow and the greater Valley County region are served by a non-profit taxi/bus service called Valley Country Transit.

==== Rail ====
- Amtrak Empire Builder (Glasgow station)

=== Adjacent counties and rural municipalities ===
- Phillips County - west
- Garfield County - south
- McCone County - south
- Roosevelt County - east
- Daniels County - east
- Rural Municipality (RM) of Mankota No. 45, Saskatchewan (SK) - north
- RM of Waverley No. 44, SK - north
- RM of Old Post No. 43, SK - north

=== National protected area ===
- Charles M. Russell National Wildlife Refuge (part)

== Economy ==
Agriculture is the major economic activity of Valley County. The US Air Force operated Glasgow Air Force Base at St. Marie until 1976, which was a strong influence on the local economy until its closure.

== Demographics ==
Historical population
Census	Pop.	Note	%±
1900	4,355		—
1910	13,630		213.0%
1920	11,542		−15.3%
1930	11,181		−3.1%
1940	15,181		35.8%
1950	11,353		−25.2%
1960	17,080		50.4%
1970	11,471		−32.8%
1980	10,250		−10.6%
1990	8,239		−19.6%
2000	7,675		−6.8%
2010	7,369		−4.0%
2020	7,578		2.8%
2025 (est.)	7,385	▼	−2.5%
U.S. Decennial Census; 1790–1960, 1900–1990, 1990–2000, 2010–2020

=== 2020 census ===
As of the 2020 census, the county had a population of 7,578. Of the residents, 23.2% were under the age of 18 and 22.9% were 65 years of age or older; the median age was 44.1 years. For every 100 females there were 105.0 males, and for every 100 females age 18 and over there were 104.5 males. 0.0% of residents lived in urban areas and 100.0% lived in rural areas.

The racial makeup of the county was 84.3% White, 0.2% Black or African American, 9.2% American Indian and Alaska Native, 0.3% Asian, 0.9% from some other race, and 5.1% from two or more races. Hispanic or Latino residents of any race comprised 2.3% of the population.

There were 3,221 households in the county, of which 25.8% had children under the age of 18 living with them and 22.4% had a female householder with no spouse or partner present. About 33.9% of all households were made up of individuals and 15.7% had someone living alone who was 65 years of age or older.

There were 4,229 housing units, of which 23.8% were vacant. Among occupied housing units, 72.0% were owner-occupied and 28.0% were renter-occupied. The homeowner vacancy rate was 2.6% and the rental vacancy rate was 13.1%.

=== 2010 census ===
As of the 2010 census, there were 7,369 people, 3,198 households, and 1,997 families living in the county. The population density was 1.5 inhabitants per square mile (0.58/km^{2}). There were 4,879 housing units at an average density of 1.0 units per square mile (0.39/km^{2}). The racial makeup of the county was 87.0% white, 9.8% American Indian, 0.5% Asian, 0.2% black or African American, 0.3% from other races, and 2.1% from two or more races. Those of Hispanic or Latino origin made up 1.2% of the population. In terms of ancestry, 33.4% were German, 27.9% were Norwegian, 12.4% were Irish, 10.3% were English, and 6.8% were American.

Of the 3,198 households, 26.9% had children under the age of 18 living with them, 50.3% were married couples living together, 8.0% had a female householder with no husband present, 37.6% were non-families, and 33.4% of all households were made up of individuals. The average household size was 2.26 and the average family size was 2.88. The median age was 46.4 years.

The median income for a household in the county was $42,050 and the median income for a family was $54,096. Males had a median income of $40,802 versus $30,272 for females. The per capita income for the county was $24,305. About 5.7% of families and 10.1% of the population were below the poverty line, including 17.0% of those under age 18 and 11.8% of those age 65 or over.

== Politics ==
Valley County voters vote reliably Republican in national elections. Since 1964, they have selected the Democratic Party candidate only once (1992, due to strong showing by third-party candidate Ross Perot, which split the Republican voters).

United States presidential election results for Valley County, Montana
Year	Republican		Democratic		Third party(ies)	
Year	No.	%	No.	%	No.	%
1904	742	67.70%	335	30.57%	19	1.73%
1908	843	59.12%	503	35.27%	80	5.61%
1912	668	25.84%	696	26.92%	1,221	47.23%
1916	1,111	32.28%	2,102	61.07%	229	6.65%
1920	2,096	62.89%	895	26.85%	342	10.26%
1924	1,555	51.10%	497	16.33%	991	32.57%
1928	2,330	63.85%	1,294	35.46%	25	0.69%
1932	1,242	30.35%	2,499	61.07%	351	8.58%
1936	996	14.11%	5,862	83.07%	199	2.82%
1940	1,597	30.94%	3,493	67.67%	72	1.39%
1944	1,341	37.44%	2,196	61.31%	45	1.26%
1948	1,375	33.45%	2,535	61.68%	200	4.87%
1952	2,462	53.28%	2,130	46.09%	29	0.63%
1956	2,357	48.42%	2,511	51.58%	0	0.00%
1960	2,387	44.65%	2,953	55.24%	6	0.11%
1964	2,077	40.53%	3,032	59.16%	16	0.31%
1968	2,290	49.44%	1,926	41.58%	416	8.98%
1972	3,210	60.02%	1,973	36.89%	165	3.09%
1976	2,520	50.82%	2,352	47.43%	87	1.75%
1980	3,242	62.47%	1,567	30.19%	381	7.34%
1984	3,123	61.89%	1,849	36.64%	74	1.47%
1988	2,467	52.42%	2,163	45.96%	76	1.61%
1992	1,497	32.77%	1,715	37.54%	1,356	29.68%
1996	1,838	43.69%	1,674	39.79%	695	16.52%
2000	2,500	63.08%	1,273	32.12%	190	4.79%
2004	2,476	61.62%	1,431	35.61%	111	2.76%
2008	2,121	54.23%	1,645	42.06%	145	3.71%
2012	2,337	60.56%	1,385	35.89%	137	3.55%
2016	2,698	69.29%	886	22.75%	310	7.96%
2020	3,135	73.57%	1,030	24.17%	96	2.25%
2024	3,019	74.01%	935	22.92%	125	3.06%

== Communities ==
=== City ===
- Glasgow (county seat)

=== Towns ===
- Fort Peck
- Nashua
- Opheim

=== Census-designated places ===
- Frazer
- Hinsdale
- St. Marie

=== Unincorporated communities ===
- Baylor
- Glentana
- Larslan
- Lustre
- Miles Crossing
- Oswego
- Park Grove
- Richland
- Roanwood
- Tampico
- Vandalia
- Whately
- Wheeler

=== Ghost towns ===
- Beaverton
- Genevieve
- Thoeny

=== Census Maps ===
Valley County Census Districts 1940

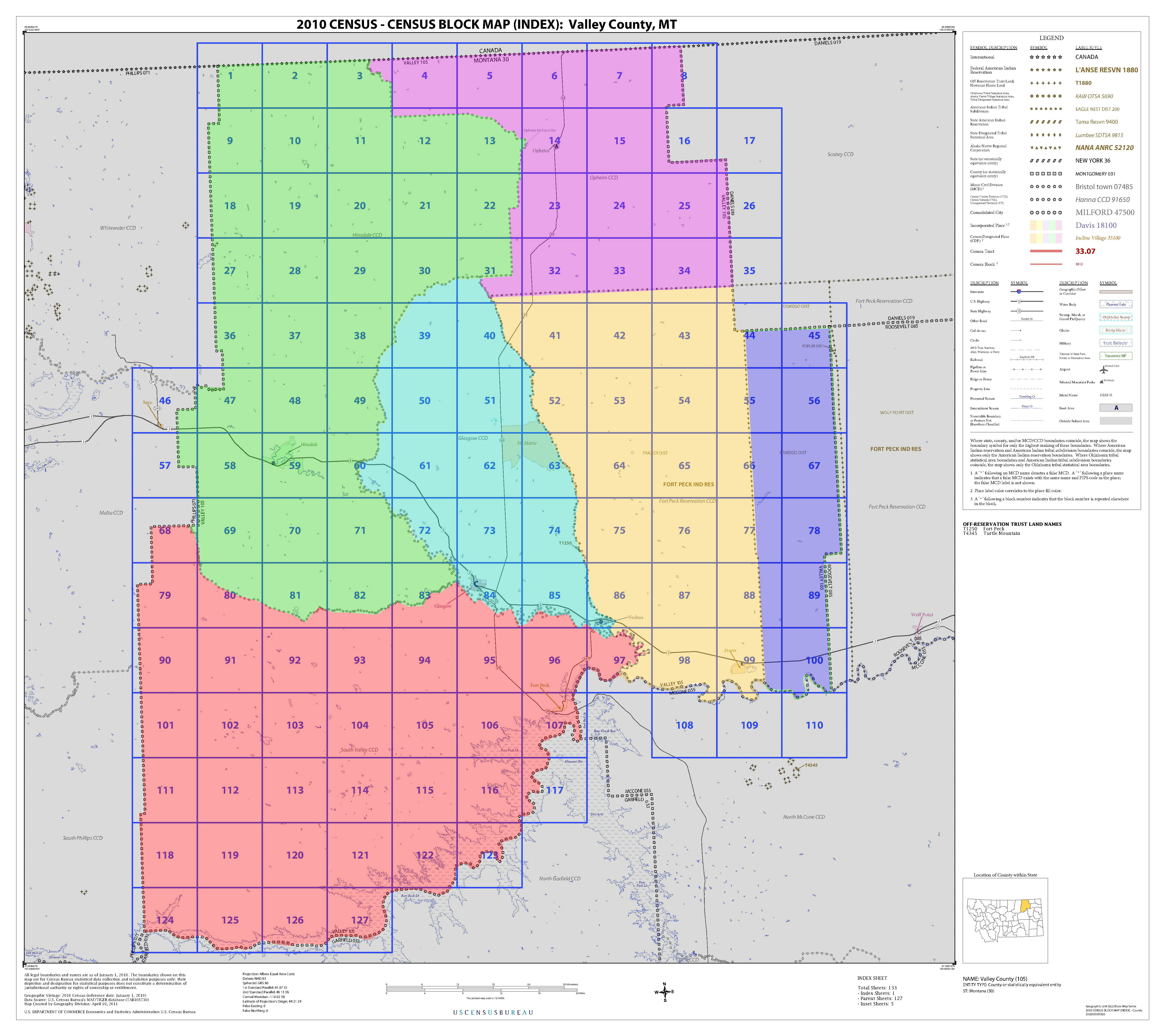
Valley County Census Districts, colored, 2010 U.S. census

== See also ==
- Fort Peck Dam
- List of lakes in Valley County, Montana (A-L)
- List of lakes in Valley County, Montana (M-Z)
- List of mountains in Valley County, Montana
- National Register of Historic Places listings in Valley County, Montana
