= Jerry Rosholt =

American journalist (1923–2008)

- Born: Karlton Jerome Rosholt; January 20, 1923; Glasgow, Montana, U.S.
- Died: April 4, 2008 (aged 85)
- Education: Luther College
- Occupations: Journalist, author
- Spouse: Carolyn Janelle Hanson (m. 1947; died 1993)
- Children: 3

Karlton Jerome Rosholt (January 20, 1923 – April 4, 2008) was an American journalist and author.

== Background ==
Rosholt was born in 1923 in Glasgow, Montana. His parents were Carl Lauritz Rosholt (1881–1952) and Ida Emilia Solem (1893–1926). He has one younger brother, Norman Tegnear Rosholt.

Rosholt attended Luther College, but was interrupted by World War II. During the war, he served with the 95th Infantry Division. After the war, he was graduated from Luther with a degree in mathematics in 1948. During college, Rosholt twice won national forensic championships in extemporaneous speech, both times winning the college division and then representing the college division in the university division and winning it. Luther College later honored him with the first Oliver Eittreim Award for Excellence in Broadcast Media (1977) and a Distinguished Service Award (1998).

== Career ==
As a journalist in Minneapolis and Saint Paul, Minnesota, Rosholt was the head writer for the radio personality Cedric Adams at WCCO. He also worked for the Associated Press in Minneapolis. In 1957, following the launch of Sputnik by the Soviet Union, Rosholt was the first American journalist to report that the successful launch signified a new age of space exploration, not just a defeat of the United States in the race to be first to enter space. For this report, Rosholt was awarded the Distinguished Journalist Award by Sigma Delta Chi (now known as the Society of Professional Journalists Sigma Delta Chi Award.) From 1960 to 1962, Rosholt represented Lutheran Film Associates in the distribution of the motion picture Question 7.

In 1962, Rosholt started working for NBC News in Philadelphia at WRCV-TV. In 1964, he represented NBC for the News Election Service, supervising the collection of votes for NES in three states. In 1966, he transferred to New York City, writing for WNBC radio. Following his reports on the August 1967 riots in Newark, New Jersey, he was promoted to the Huntley-Brinkley Report.

During the final years of the Huntley-Brinkley Report and during the period of time that David Brinkley was anchor of the NBC Nightly News, Rosholt was a field producer, notably covering the Indo-Pakistani War of 1971, which won Emmys in every category of television news coverage. He also covered the U.S. - U.S.S.R. Strategic Arms Limitation Talks (SALT), the Sadat-Begin Peace Talks, the William Calley trial, several Civil Rights demonstrations, anti-Vietnam War protests and national political conventions from 1964 to 1988.

In 1972, when John Chancellor took over as anchor of the NBC Nightly News, Chancellor selected Rosholt as his personal producer and head editor. They worked together until Chancellor was replaced by Tom Brokaw. Transferring to NBC News Computers, Rosholt finished his career rising to the level of director and retiring in 1988.

Ole Goes to War: Men from Norway Who Fought in America's Civil War

== Vesterheim Museum ==
In 1996, Rosholt was asked by Darell Henning, curator of Vesterheim Norwegian-American Museum, to compile a database of Norwegian immigrants who fought in the U.S. Civil War. In 2003, Vesterheim opened an exhibit on Norwegian-American soldiers. Accompanying the exhibit was the database and a book, also written by Rosholt, titled Ole Goes to War: Men from Norway Who Fought in America's Civil War. The book contained stories and pictures Rosholt had found during his research.

In September 2006, Rosholt was awarded the St Olav's medal by King Harald V of Norway "in recognition of [his] great services to Norway, in particular [his] active involvement with the Vesterheim Norwegian-American Museum on its Civil War project". The medal was presented on October 21 in Decorah, Iowa, by Norwegian Consul General Rolf Hansen.

== Personal life ==
Rosholt married Carolyn Janelle Hanson (1926–1993) on August 28, 1947, in Oak Park, Illinois. They had three sons.
