= Malta station =

Empire Builder train stop

Malta, MT
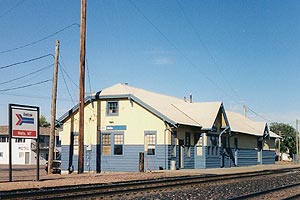
- Station from across the platform

General information
- Location: 51 South 1st Street East; Malta, Montana; United States
- Coordinates: 48.3605°N 107.8719°W
- Owner: BNSF Railway
- Line: BNSF Milk River Subdivision
- Platforms: 1 side platform
- Tracks: 4

Construction
- Parking: Yes
- Accessible: Yes

Other information
- Station code: Amtrak: MAL

History
- Opened: June 18, 1893

Passengers
- FY 2025: 5,100 (Amtrak)

Services
Preceding station	Amtrak	Following station
Havre toward Seattle or Portland	Empire Builder	Glasgow toward Chicago
Former services
Preceding station	Great Northern Railway	Following station
Exeter toward Seattle	Main Line	Strater toward St. Paul
Location

Malta station is a station stop for the Amtrak Empire Builder in Malta, Montana. The station, platform, and parking are owned by BNSF Railway.

== Bibliography ==
- Allen, W.F. (1893). Travelers Official Guide of the Railway and Steam Navigation Lines in the United States and Canada. New York, New York: National Railway Publication Company.
