= Southern Cross, Montana =

Ghost town in the United States

Coordinates: 46°12′37″N 113°14′11″W

Southern Cross is a ghost town in Deer Lodge County, Montana, United States, at an elevation of 7,000 feet, overlooking Georgetown Lake. Its population was 4 or 5 people as of 2008.
