= Wolf Point station =

Wolf Point, MT
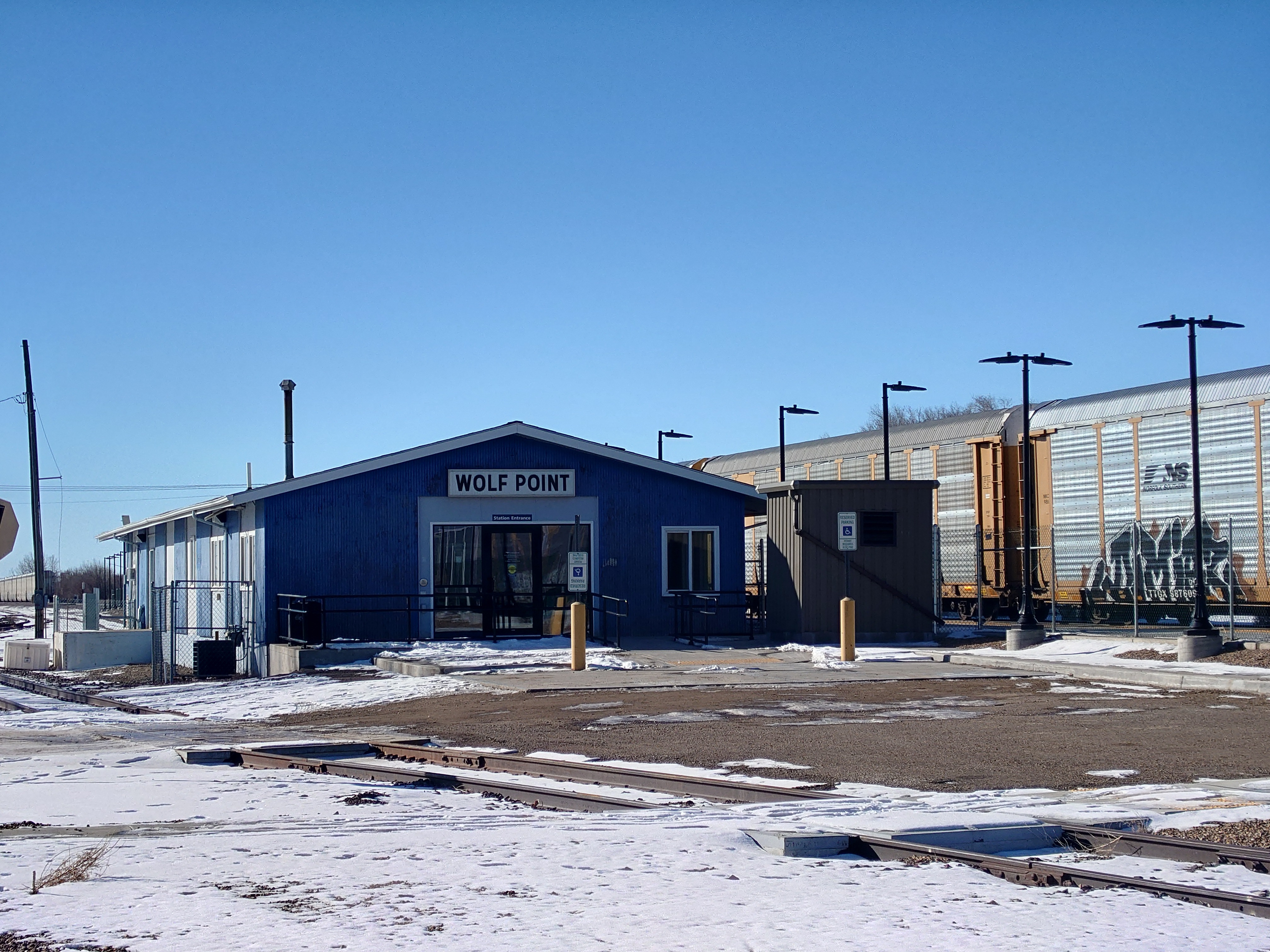
- Wolf Point station platform

General information
- Location: 320 Front Street; Wolf Point, Montana; United States
- Coordinates: 48.0915°N 105.6431°W
- Owner: BNSF Railway
- Line: BNSF Glasgow Subdivision
- Platforms: 1 side platform
- Tracks: 2

Construction
- Parking: Yes
- Accessible: Yes

Other information
- Station code: Amtrak: WPT

History
- Opened: June 18, 1893
- Rebuilt: 1963, 2021

Passengers
- FY 2025: 3,307 (Amtrak)

Services
Preceding station	Amtrak	Following station
Glasgow toward Seattle or Portland	Empire Builder	Williston toward Chicago
Former services
Preceding station	Great Northern Railway	Following station
Lohmiller toward Seattle	Main Line	Macon toward St. Paul
Location

Wolf Point station is a train station in Wolf Point, Montana. It is a stop for the Amtrak Empire Builder line. The station, platform, and parking are owned by BNSF Railway. Prior to the formation of Amtrak, the Great Northern Railway operated passenger service along the line.

The depot was built in 1963 to replace an earlier depot that was sold and moved to another site. In fall 2021, Amtrak completed a more than $4.1 million project to enhance accessibility at the Wolf Point station. The scope of work included construction of a new 650-foot long, 12-foot-wide concrete platform, installation of new signage and lighting, and relocation of a wheelchair lift enclosure. Exterior improvements around the depot encompassed upgrades to the accessible parking area, a connection to the street and walkways between the parking and depot.

== Bibliography ==
- Allen, W.F. (1893). Travelers Official Guide of the Railway and Steam Navigation Lines in the United States and Canada. New York, New York: National Railway Publication Company.
