= Glasgow, Montana =

City in Montana, United States

- City
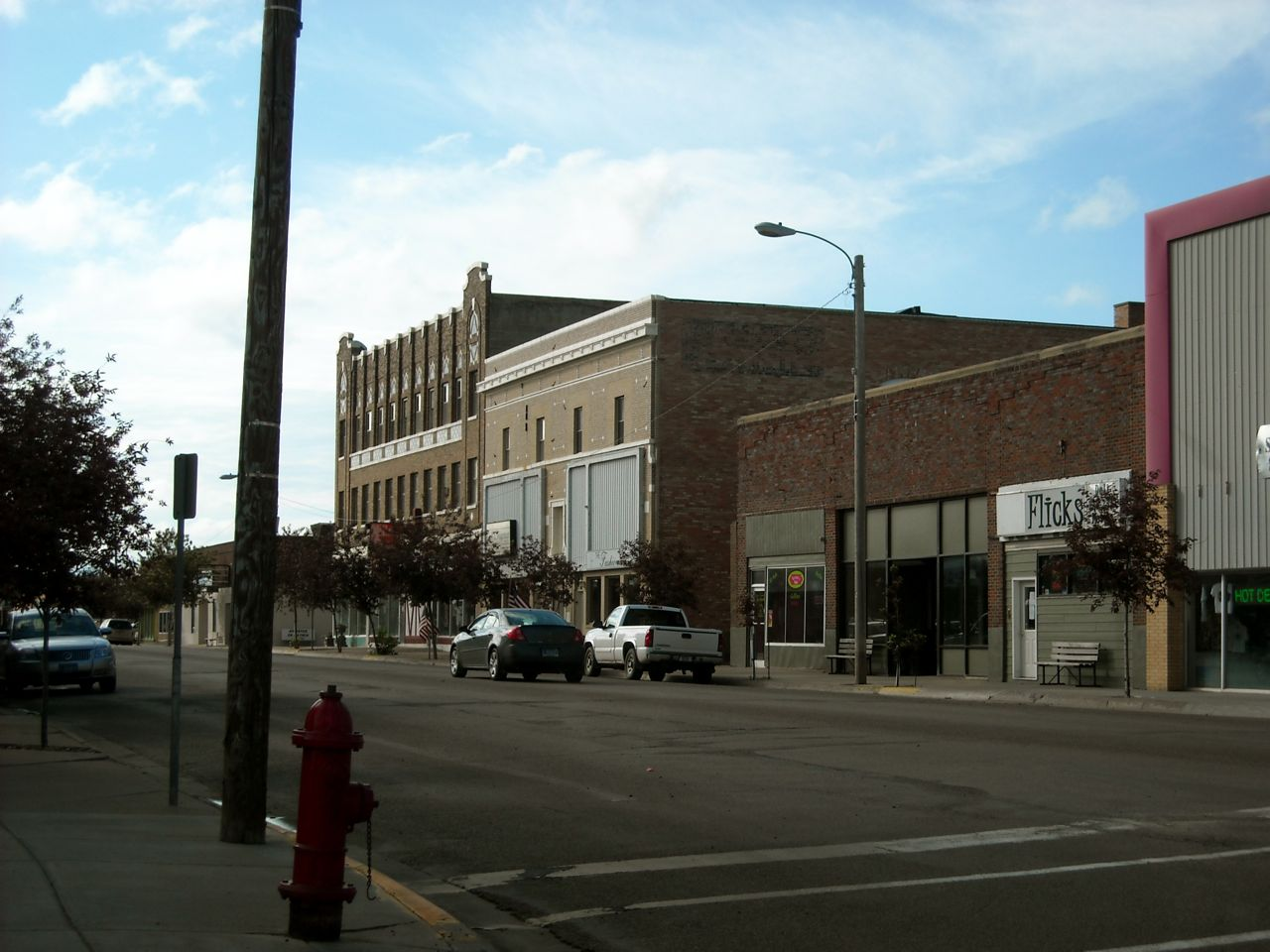
- Downtown Glasgow

- Logo

- Location of Glasgow, Montana
- Coordinates: 48°11′57″N 106°37′55″W
- Country: United States
- State: Montana
- County: Valley
- Founded: 1887

Government
  - Mayor: Rod Karst

Area
  - Total: 1.40 sq mi (3.63 km^{2})
  - Land: 1.40 sq mi (3.63 km^{2})
  - Water: 0 sq mi (0.00 km^{2})
- Elevation: 2,113 ft (644 m)

Population (2020)
  - Total: 3,202
  - Density: 2,281.5/sq mi (880.89/km^{2})
- Time zone: UTC−7 (Mountain)
  - Summer (DST): UTC−6 (Mountain)
- ZIP codes: 59230–59231
- Area code: 406
- FIPS code: 30-31075
- GNIS feature ID: 2410594
- Website: cityofglasgowmt.com

Glasgow is a city in and the county seat of Valley County, Montana, United States. The population was 3,202 at the 2020 census.

Despite being just the 23rd most populous city in Montana, Glasgow is the most populous city for over 110 mi (177 km), thus making it an important economic hub for a large region in Eastern Montana. Both Amtrak and the National Weather Service operate facilities in Glasgow that link the city to the surrounding region.

== History ==
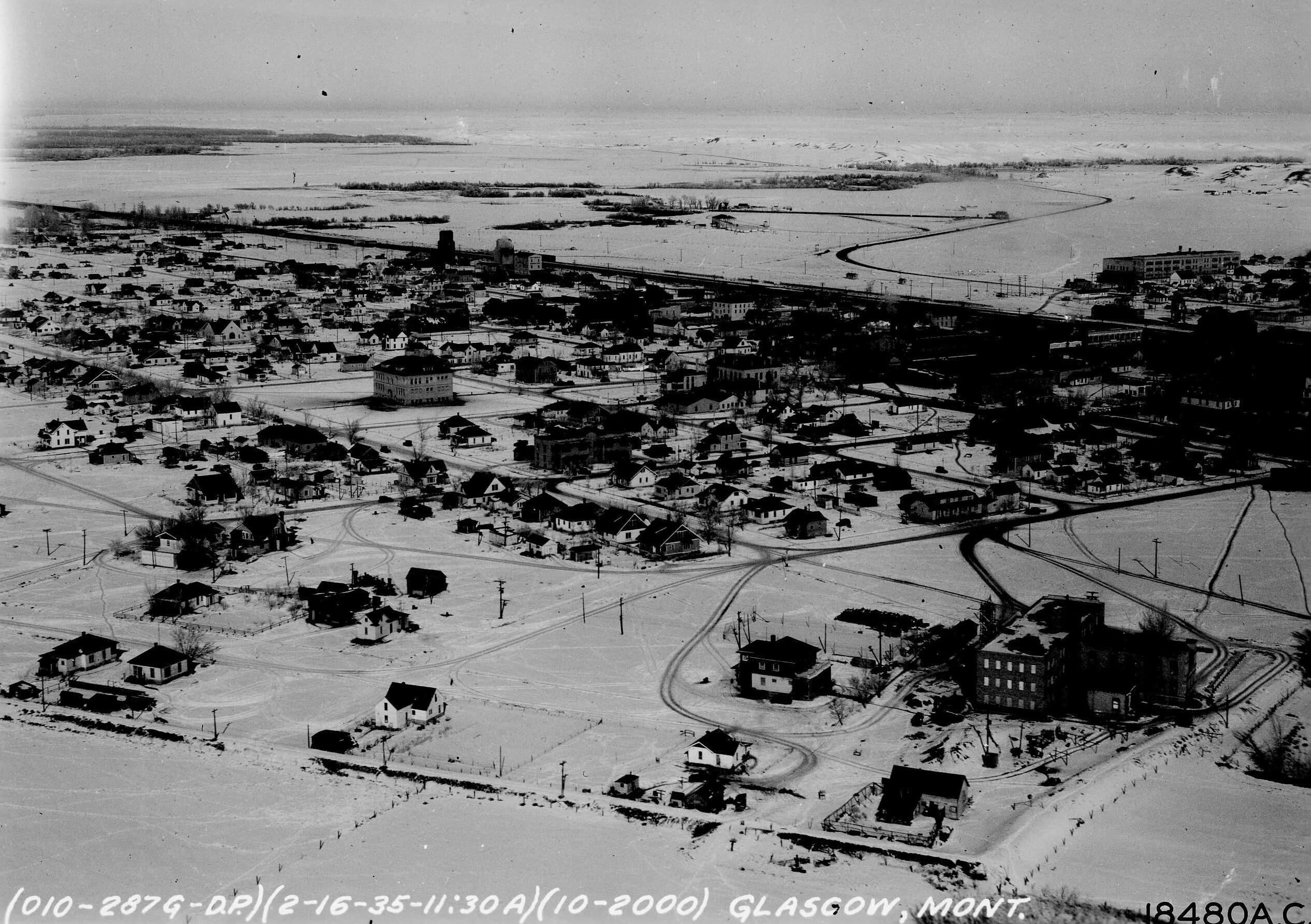
Aerial view of Glasgow, 1935

Native Americans inhabited the region for centuries, and extensive buffalo and pronghorn antelope herds provided ample food for the nomadic tribes. The Nakoda, Lakota, and Dakota peoples alternately inhabited and claimed the region from the 16th to the late 19th centuries. In 1804 the Lewis and Clark Expedition came within 15 miles (24 km) of the future site of Glasgow and noted the extensive herds of buffalo and various game. In 1851, the US government formed the first treaty with the Native American tribes, in 1885 the tribes engaged in the last known buffalo hunt in the region.

From 1885 to Montana Statehood in 1889, the tribes participated in agreements with the US government to re-drawing the Fort Peck reservation boundaries in exchange for federal subsidies. As more and more homesteaders moved into the surrounding areas, pressure was placed on Congress to open up the Fort Peck Reservation to homesteading, resulting in tribes leaving the Glasgow area.

Glasgow was founded in 1887 as a railroad town by James Hill, who was responsible for creating many communities along the Hi-Line. He and a local railroader named the town when they spun a globe with a finger landing on Glasgow, Scotland. Glasgow grew during the 1930s when President Franklin D. Roosevelt authorized the construction of the Fort Peck Dam, which became a major source of employment for the Glasgow area.

During World War II, the Glasgow Army Airfield housed the 96th Bombardment Squadron and 614th Bombardment Squadron, flying B-17 Flying Fortresses, at different times during the war. Starting in December 1944, a German POW camp was established at the facility, lasting until the end of the war. After the war ended the base was closed, and part of the facility eventually became the present day Glasgow Valley County Airport. Glasgow was the death place of Lieutenant Colonel Ronald Speirs, famed member of Easy Company, 101st Airborne.

In the 1960s, the population rose to about 6,400 due to the nearby presence of the Glasgow Air Force Base, (SAC air command and housing B-52 bombers) used during the Vietnam War and the earlier part of the Cold War. A significant amount of mid-century modern and Googie-style architecture was built then. After the de-activation and closure of the base in 1969, Glasgow's population declined to about half its one-time size by 1990, when the loss rate stabilized. Glasgow still functions as the major regional administrative, shopping and services hub for Valley County and some of the areas beyond.

== Geography ==
According to the United States Census Bureau, the city has a total area of 1.43 square miles (3.7 km^{2}), all land. The town has an elevation of 2,093 feet (638 m). It is nestled in the Milk River Valley with the river itself meandering along to south.

Glasgow is 18 miles (29 km) north of Fort Peck Lake, the fifth largest artificial lake in the United States. The lake is popular for fishing and for recreation. The Charles M. Russell National Wildlife Refuge surrounds the lake providing an opportunity to experience nearly the same surroundings as encountered by the Lewis and Clark Expedition in 1805.

Using data from Oxford University's Big Data Institute, The Washington Post, in 2018, identified Glasgow as "the middle of nowhere" for the contiguous United States. The article stated "Of all towns with more than 1,000 residents, Glasgow ... is farthest – about 4.5 hours in any direction – from any metropolitan area of more than 75,000 people".

=== Climate ===
Climate chart for Glasgow

Glasgow experiences a continental semi-arid climate (Köppen climate classification BSk) with long, dry winters with typically freezing but exceedingly variable temperatures and hot, dry summers. The extreme variability of winter temperatures is due to the large warming produced by chinook winds as air descending from the Rockies is warmed, contrasting with very cold continental air masses typical of inland locations at this latitude. As an illustration, the record cold month of February 1936 averaged −15.8 °F (−26.6 °C), but the two warmest Februaries of 1931 and 1984 averaged above 32 °F or 0 °C and had mean maxima above 43.5 °F or 6.4 °C. Snowfall averages 34.8 inches or 0.88 meters per year. Tornadoes are a rare occurrence. Two F2 tornadoes did, however, hit the Glasgow area on June 25, 1975.

Climate data for Glasgow Valley County Airport, Montana, 1991–2020 normals, extremes 1893–present
Month	Jan	Feb	Mar	Apr	May	Jun	Jul	Aug	Sep	Oct	Nov	Dec	Year
Record high °F (°C)	62 (17)	74 (23)	81 (27)	93 (34)	102 (39)	110 (43)	113 (45)	108 (42)	103 (39)	96 (36)	79 (26)	69 (21)	113 (45)
Mean maximum °F (°C)	46.7 (8.2)	49.1 (9.5)	65.7 (18.7)	78.9 (26.1)	86.5 (30.3)	93.8 (34.3)	98.8 (37.1)	99.3 (37.4)	92.7 (33.7)	80.7 (27.1)	64.3 (17.9)	48.3 (9.1)	101.4 (38.6)
Mean daily maximum °F (°C)	23.5 (−4.7)	28.0 (−2.2)	41.8 (5.4)	56.8 (13.8)	67.7 (19.8)	76.3 (24.6)	85.5 (29.7)	84.8 (29.3)	72.9 (22.7)	56.5 (13.6)	40.0 (4.4)	27.2 (−2.7)	55.1 (12.8)
Daily mean °F (°C)	14.6 (−9.7)	18.7 (−7.4)	31.6 (−0.2)	44.8 (7.1)	55.5 (13.1)	64.5 (18.1)	72.0 (22.2)	71.0 (21.7)	59.9 (15.5)	45.2 (7.3)	30.2 (−1.0)	18.5 (−7.5)	43.9 (6.6)
Mean daily minimum °F (°C)	5.8 (−14.6)	9.4 (−12.6)	21.4 (−5.9)	32.8 (0.4)	43.3 (6.3)	52.7 (11.5)	58.5 (14.7)	57.2 (14.0)	46.9 (8.3)	33.8 (1.0)	20.5 (−6.4)	9.7 (−12.4)	32.7 (0.4)
Mean minimum °F (°C)	−22.9 (−30.5)	−14.5 (−25.8)	−4.0 (−20.0)	16.4 (−8.7)	28.3 (−2.1)	41.4 (5.2)	48.1 (8.9)	43.6 (6.4)	30.4 (−0.9)	15.1 (−9.4)	−2.8 (−19.3)	−16.5 (−26.9)	−27.8 (−33.2)
Record low °F (°C)	−56 (−49)	−59 (−51)	−45 (−43)	−19 (−28)	15 (−9)	24 (−4)	34 (1)	28 (−2)	14 (−10)	−8 (−22)	−41 (−41)	−47 (−44)	−59 (−51)
Average precipitation inches (mm)	0.44 (11)	0.35 (8.9)	0.47 (12)	1.01 (26)	2.22 (56)	2.83 (72)	1.95 (50)	1.27 (32)	1.06 (27)	0.92 (23)	0.49 (12)	0.43 (11)	13.44 (341)
Average snowfall inches (cm)	9.8 (25)	6.2 (16)	5.6 (14)	2.5 (6.4)	0.9 (2.3)	0.0 (0.0)	0.0 (0.0)	0.0 (0.0)	0.0 (0.0)	1.5 (3.8)	5.9 (15)	8.3 (21)	40.7 (103)
Average extreme snow depth inches (cm)	7.1 (18)	5.8 (15)	5.2 (13)	1.6 (4.1)	0.2 (0.51)	0.0 (0.0)	0.0 (0.0)	0.0 (0.0)	0.0 (0.0)	0.9 (2.3)	3.2 (8.1)	4.9 (12)	9.9 (25)
Average precipitation days (≥ 0.01 in)	7.8	6.4	6.8	7.8	10.6	12.7	9.2	7.6	6.7	6.7	6.2	6.6	95.1
Average snowy days (≥ 0.1 in)	8.5	6.7	5.1	2.2	0.6	0.0	0.0	0.0	0.0	1.5	4.6	7.1	36.3
Average relative humidity (%)	73.5	74.8	71.0	56.4	55.9	54.8	50.4	48.8	55.2	60.1	70.9	74.9	62.2
Average dew point °F (°C)	4.1 (−15.5)	10.8 (−11.8)	20.3 (−6.5)	27.1 (−2.7)	37.6 (3.1)	45.7 (7.6)	48.6 (9.2)	46.0 (7.8)	38.3 (3.5)	29.7 (−1.3)	19.4 (−7.0)	8.4 (−13.1)	28.0 (−2.2)
Source 1: NOAA (relative humidity and dew points 1961–1990)
Source 2: National Weather Service

See or edit raw graph data.

== Demographics ==
Historical population
Census	Pop.	Note	%±
1910	1,158		—
1920	2,059		77.8%
1930	2,216		7.6%
1940	3,799		71.4%
1950	3,821		0.6%
1960	6,398		67.4%
1970	4,700		−26.5%
1980	4,455		−5.2%
1990	3,572		−19.8%
2000	3,253		−8.9%
2010	3,250		−0.1%
2020	3,202		−1.5%
U.S. Decennial Census

=== 2020 census ===
As of the 2020 census, Glasgow had a population of 3,202. The median age was 41.9 years. 22.0% of residents were under the age of 18 and 22.6% of residents were 65 years of age or older. For every 100 females there were 100.1 males, and for every 100 females age 18 and over there were 96.5 males age 18 and over.

0.0% of residents lived in urban areas, while 100.0% lived in rural areas.

There were 1,405 households in Glasgow, of which 24.8% had children under the age of 18 living in them. Of all households, 43.3% were married-couple households, 22.4% were households with a male householder and no spouse or partner present, and 28.8% were households with a female householder and no spouse or partner present. About 38.9% of all households were made up of individuals and 16.4% had someone living alone who was 65 years of age or older.

There were 1,614 housing units, of which 12.9% were vacant. The homeowner vacancy rate was 3.4% and the rental vacancy rate was 13.5%.

Racial composition as of the 2020 census
Race	Number	Percent
White	2,849	89.0%
Black or African American	5	0.2%
American Indian and Alaska Native	144	4.5%
Asian	10	0.3%
Native Hawaiian and Other Pacific Islander	0	0.0%
Some other race	19	0.6%
Two or more races	175	5.5%
Hispanic or Latino (of any race)	69	2.2%

=== 2010 census ===
As of the 2010 census, there were 3,250 people, 1,479 households, and 834 families residing in the city. The population density was 2,272.7 inhabitants per square mile (877.5/km^{2}). There were 1,653 housing units at an average density of 1,155.9 per square mile (446.3/km^{2}). The racial makeup of the city was 91.8% White, 0.2% African American, 4.5% Native American, 0.3% Asian, 0.4% from other races, and 2.7% from two or more races. Hispanic or Latino of any race were 1.8% of the population.

There were 1,479 households, of which 26.6% had children under the age of 18 living with them, 43.5% were married couples living together, 9.1% had a female householder with no husband present, 3.8% had a male householder with no wife present, and 43.6% were non-families. 39.7% of all households were made up of individuals, and 19.6% had someone living alone who was 65 years of age or older. The average household size was 2.13 and the average family size was 2.85.

The median age in the city was 45.6 years. 22.7% of residents were under the age of 18; 5.2% were between the ages of 18 and 24; 21.3% were from 25 to 44; 28% were from 45 to 64; and 22.7% were 65 years of age or older. The gender makeup of the city was 47.8% male and 52.2% female.

=== Income and poverty ===
The median income for a household in the city was $35,504. 14.5% of the population were below the federal poverty line, compared to 15.1% for the USA as a whole.

== Economy ==
In May 2012, the major industries present in Glasgow were retail (23% of employment), public administration (16%), construction (14%), and health care and social assistance (7%). Farmers and farm services comprised 4% of employment. As of June 2014, the unemployment rate was 3.2%.

For Valley County, the median value of owner-occupied housing units was $160,800 from 2017 to 2021. From 2019-2023 it rose to $198,600.

== Arts and culture ==
The Children's Museum of Northeast Montana has creative hands-on exhibits and includes information from dinosaurs to space. The Valley County Pioneer Museum focuses on local history. It includes the Stan Kalinski room with an ornate cherry wood bar from Stan's Bar as well as over 200 animal and bird mounts.

There are several annual events including an ice fishing tournament, the Longest Dam Race, and Milk River Catfish Days.

Glasgow City-County Library serves the area.

=== Sports ===
As of 2023, the Scotties of Glasgow High School have won 48 Montana state championships. Glasgow High School offered 13 sports in 2023. Since the 1992–93 school year, they have competed as a Class B school, a designation used by the Montana High School Association based on population.

They have won 14 state championships and 33 state trophies in boys wrestling. The Girls Cross Country team has won the state championship 16 times.

The Glasgow Reds baseball team competes in the American Legion Baseball league, played by 13-to-19-year-olds. They finished second at the state championships in 2000 and 2012 and third in 1999, 2013, and 2015.

== Government ==
Glasgow has a mayor and city council. There are six council members who represent three wards. Incumbent mayor Rod Karst was unopposed in the November 2025 election.

Karst was first elected in 2021. He replaced Becky Erickson who did not seek re-election. Erickson's first term started January 2014 after she defeated incumbent Dan Carney.

== Education ==
Glasgow is served by the Glasgow School District, with three public schools. For the 2021–2022 school year, 379 students were enrolled in kindergarten through 5th grade at Irle Elementary School. At Glasgow Middle School, for 6th–8th grade, 167 students were enrolled. Glasgow High School had 245 students enrolled. The team name for the school is the Scotties.

From 2017–2022 census data on those 25 years and older in Valley County, 93% had attained high school graduation or higher, 19.1% had a Bachelor's degree or higher.

== Infrastructure ==
=== Crime ===
There were no reports of rape or murder occurring in Glasgow in 2010, compared with one murder the previous year, and 16 incidents of rape from 2003 to 2008. Overall, the crime rate to 2010 appears to be in a general downward trend, and is well below the national average.

=== Transportation ===
==== Rail ====
Glasgow is on the Hi-Line of the BNSF Railway and is served daily westbound and eastbound by Amtrak's Empire Builder route.

==== Air ====
Glasgow is served by Glasgow Valley County Airport and has daily commercial service to Billings. Since 2013, the commercial air service provider is Cape Air.

==== Bus ====
Glasgow and the greater Valley County region are served by a non-profit taxi/bus service called Valley Country Transit. Bus and/or Van rides are available daily for in-county travel and one-way or two-way trips out of the county. Riders are charged on a per trip basis and must call in a ride. As of 2022, the transportation service, Uber is also now in operation within city limits.

==== Roads ====
Glasgow is located on U.S. Highway 2, which is a major east-west traffic corridor of the northern Great Plains region. Montana Highway 24 passes nearby the city, a major north-south route connecting southern Montana to Canada. No Interstates run near the region.

== Media ==
Glasgow is part of the Glendive Media Market, as of 2021, the smallest tracked by Nielsen serving an estimated 3,900 homes.

=== Newspaper ===
- The Glasgow Courier, established in 1892 and published every Wednesday, is the newspaper of record for Valley County.
- The BS Buzz, is a daily newspaper published by BS Central Inc. The Buzz offers advertising options on daily, weekly and monthly rates.

=== Local radio stations ===
- KLTZ, 1240 AM
- KLAN, 93.5 FM

=== Local television stations ===
- K18BN-D (18.1 PBJ) UHF 18

== Notable people ==
- Stacy Edwards, actress
- Julie Golob, professional sharpshooter and competition shooter
- Ann Hould-Ward, Tony-winning costume designer
- Michael McFaul, former United States Ambassador to Russia
- Donald Grant Nutter, 15th governor of Montana
- Tony Raines, NASCAR driver and spotter
- Uan Rasey, trumpeter who played on several motion picture soundtracks in the 1950s and 1960s
- Steve Reeves, bodybuilder and actor
- Jerry Rosholt, journalist and author
- Brian Salonen, NFL player
- Anthony Washington, three-time Olympic discus thrower
