= Garnet, Montana =

- Garnet Historic District
- U.S. National Register of Historic Places
- Garnet's surviving commercial buildings

- Location within Montana Location within the United States
- Location: 11 mi north of junction of Old US 10 and Bear Gulch Rd, Bureau of Land Management, Garnet Resource Area, Garnet, Montana
- Coordinates: 46°49′31″N 113°20′20″W
- Area: 134 acres (54 ha)
- Built: 1895
- Built by: Ole Dahl
- Architectural style: Late 19th and Early 20th Century American Movements
- NRHP reference No.: 10000547
- Added to NRHP: August 12, 2010

Garnet is a ghost town in Granite County, Montana, United States. A thriving mining town in the 1890s, Garnet's population declined when local hard rock mines closed. The remaining buildings have been preserved and are open to visitors. The site is managed by the Bureau of Land Management.

Garnet is located 11 miles (18 km) north of the junction of Interstate 90, U.S. Route 12 and Bear Gulch Rd. in the Bureau of Land Management's Garnet Resource Area.

== History ==
Miners prospected in the Garnet Mountains beginning in the 1860s. When a stamp mill was built at First Chance Gulch in 1895, a small town grew up nearby. Originally named Mitchell, the town changed its name to Garnet in 1897. In its heyday, Garnet boasted close to thirteen saloons (bars), as well as grocery stores, a barber shop, mercantile store, and three hotels. The hotels were started for passersby or people coming to pick up gold. Their rates typically ranged from $1–3, and the poor miners who could not afford that price could sleep in the attic without any windows for a quarter.

Architects/builders included Ole Dahl, who built Dahl Saloon (also known as Ole's and as "The Joint") and the Dahl House, Robert Moore who built Kelly's Saloon, Hugh Hannifen who built Hannifen House, Judson and Blaidsell who built the F.A. Davey Store, and John and Winifred Wells who built the Wells Hotel. Supplies needed in Garnet were generally obtained from nearby Bearmouth.

In 1898, as many as one thousand people lived in Garnet, but the boom was short lived. By 1900, three hundred people called the town home. Population declined, rose, and declined again with the fortunes of local mines. A fire in 1912 destroyed much of the town.

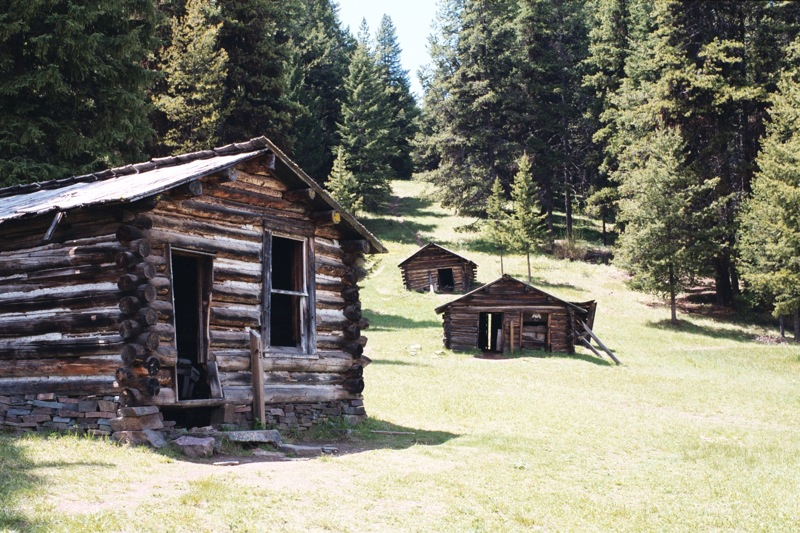
Several of Garnet's remaining miner's cabins

== Preservation ==
Despite this, Garnet is one of the state's best preserved ghost towns with 16,000 visitors annually. The annual celebration the third Saturday of each year is Garnet Day. Garnet's oldest living member, Mary Jane Adams Morin, came to visit every year.

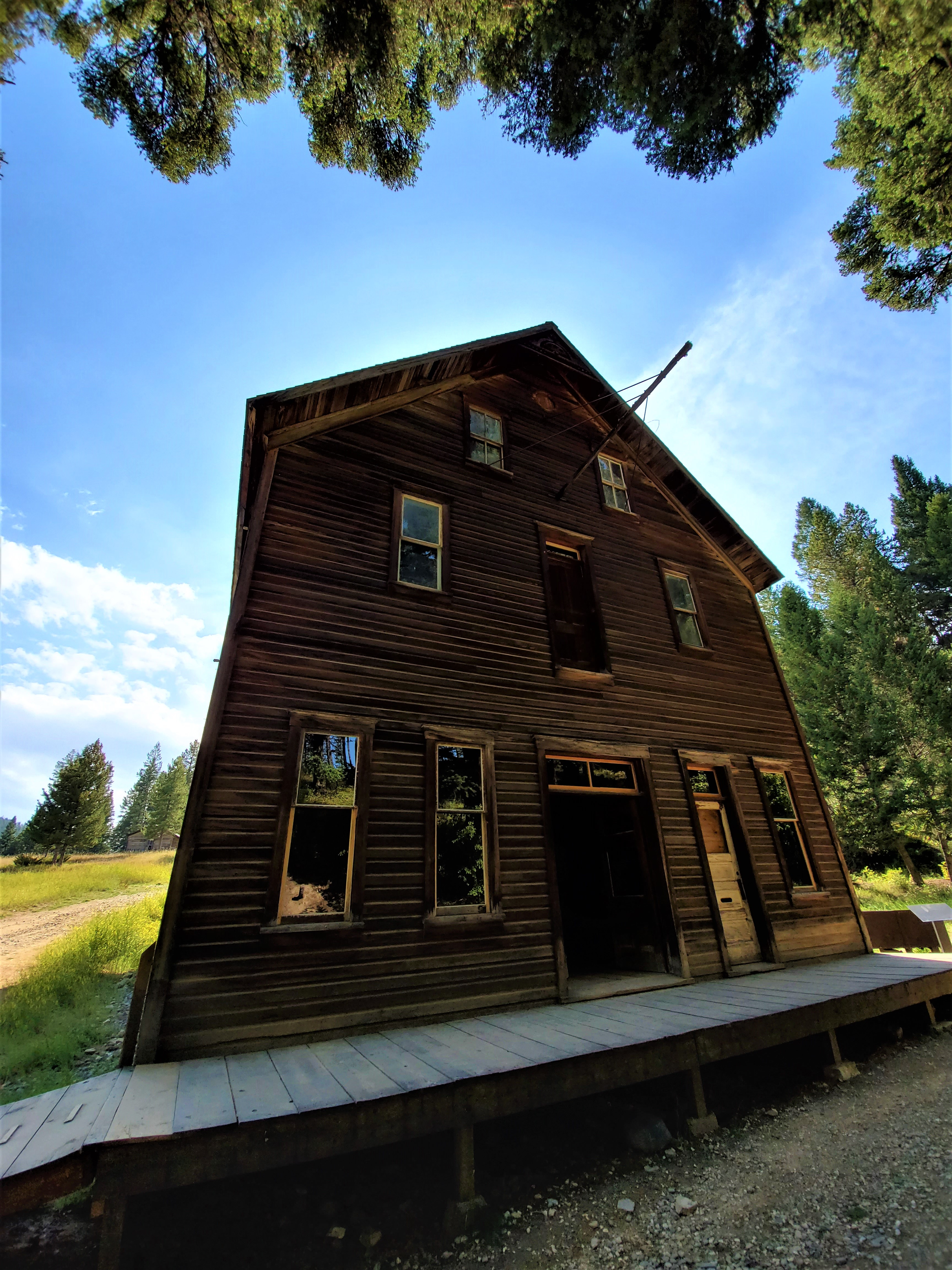
Wells Hotel, Garnet Ghost Town, Montana

The town was listed on the National Register of Historic Places as the Garnet Historic District, a historic district, in 2010. The listing included 82 contributing buildings, 46 contributing structures, and 56 contributing sites, as well as four non-contributing buildings, on 134 acres (54 ha). The buildings are mostly at the north end of First Chance Gulch, but the listing includes mining structures in a wider area extending in all directions from the town site.

The area is owned by the U.S. Bureau of Land Management and is included in its Garnet Resource Area.

== Geography ==
In First Chance Gulch in western Montana, the town is located 11 miles up the Garnet Range Road, in mountains and forest. The town is at approximately 6,000 feet (1,800 m) elevation. The nearest city is Missoula, approximately 20 miles (32 km) to the west. The closest city to the east is Butte, about 100 miles (160 km) away.

== Gallery ==
Garnet in 2020
Inside Cabin Garnet Ghost Town, Montana	Cabin Interior Garnet Ghost Town, Montana	Cabin Front Garnet Ghost Town, Montana
Stove in Cabin Garnet Ghost Town, Montana	Room in Garnet Ghost Town, Montana	Kitchen Garnet Ghost Town, Montana
Old shoes found at Garnet Ghost Town, Montana	Store Fronts Garnet Ghost Town, Montana	Kelly Saloon, Garnet Ghost Town, Montana
Inside Kelly Saloon, Garnet Ghost Town, Montana	Daveys Store, Garnet Ghost Town, Montana	Garnet Ghost Town, Montana
