= Opheim, Montana =

- Town
- Location of Opheim, Montana
- Coordinates: 48°51′25″N 106°24′30″W
- Country: United States
- State: Montana
- County: Valley

Area
  - Total: 0.21 sq mi (0.54 km^{2})
  - Land: 0.21 sq mi (0.54 km^{2})
  - Water: 0 sq mi (0.00 km^{2})
- Elevation: 3,265 ft (995 m)

Population (2020)
  - Total: 75
  - Density: 359.6/sq mi (138.85/km^{2})
- Time zone: UTC-7 (Mountain (MST))
  - Summer (DST): UTC-6 (MDT)
- ZIP code: 59250
- Area code: 406
- FIPS code: 30-55525
- GNIS feature ID: 2413084

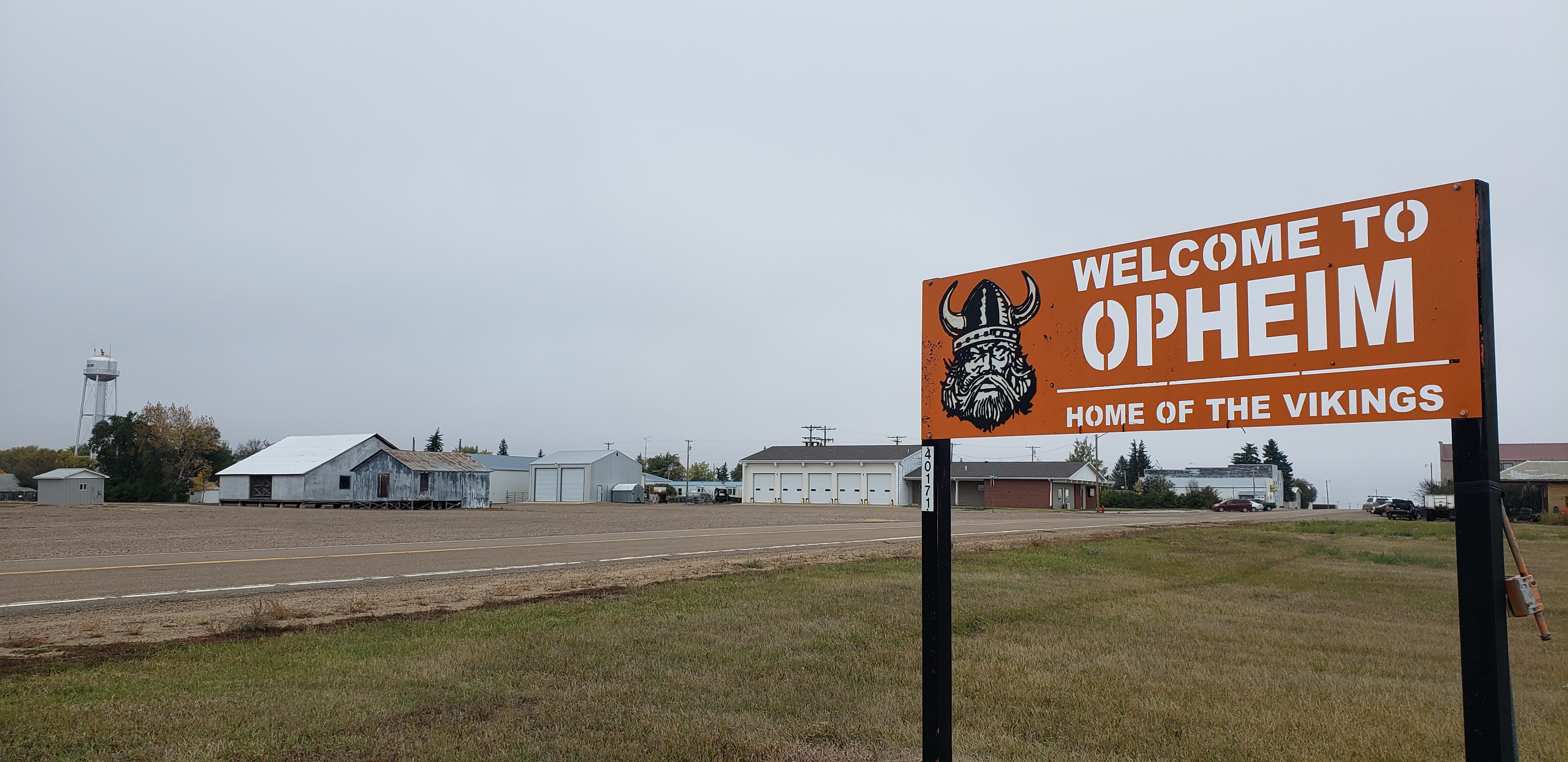
Entering Opheim

Opheim is a town in Valley County, Montana, United States. The population was 75 at the 2020 census.

== History ==
- Opheim was named for Alfred Sumner Opheim (1872–1949), who together with his wife Helen (Ouandahl) Opheim (1874–1930), served as the first postmasters of the town.
- The town was founded before the expansion of the Great Northern Railway, but benefited by having its own depot. In the early 1990s, railway abandonment occurred between the towns of Scobey and Opheim.
- Opheim was once the location of Opheim Air Force Station, a former United States Air Force General Surveillance Radar station. Since its closing in 1979, the population has decreased significantly.
- The city was also home to many banks, bars, stores, and a movie theater, all of which have changed hands or closed. The town has no major source of income and is currently facing a slow economic decline.
- Granrud's Lefse was started in a garage in Opheim in 1977 by Evan and Myrt Granrud. It is one of the few area bakeries that still produces the traditional Norwegian potato flatbread, Lefse. It was sold in 2018 and moved to Scobey, Montana.
- Opheim has a strong Norwegian-American heritage as reflected by the high school's mascot, the Vikings. Opheim High School was the source of media attention in 2008 when the graduating class consisted of one student.
- Opheim celebrated its 100th anniversary in 2011 over the 4th of July weekend. Hundreds of former residents and former students enjoyed a number of events marking a rich history of immigrant homesteaders that once made Opheim a thriving town of almost 500 residents and business providing services to all of north Valley County.

== Geography ==
According to the United States Census Bureau, the town has a total area of 0.21 square miles (0.54 km^{2}), all land.

=== Climate ===
According to the Köppen Climate Classification system, Opheim has a semi-arid climate, abbreviated "BSk" on climate maps.

Climate data for Opheim, Montana, 1991–2020 normals, extremes 1943–present
| Month | Jan | Feb | Mar | Apr | May | Jun | Jul | Aug | Sep | Oct | Nov | Dec | Year |
|---|---|---|---|---|---|---|---|---|---|---|---|---|---|
| Record high °F (°C) | 56 (13) | 66 (19) | 75 (24) | 91 (33) | 98 (37) | 105 (41) | 103 (39) | 105 (41) | 100 (38) | 91 (33) | 76 (24) | 55 (13) | 105 (41) |
| Mean maximum °F (°C) | 41.9 (5.5) | 43.6 (6.4) | 59.9 (15.5) | 73.5 (23.1) | 81.9 (27.7) | 87.7 (30.9) | 93.3 (34.1) | 94.2 (34.6) | 87.7 (30.9) | 75.6 (24.2) | 57.4 (14.1) | 41.5 (5.3) | 96.0 (35.6) |
| Mean daily maximum °F (°C) | 18.1 (−7.7) | 21.8 (−5.7) | 34.1 (1.2) | 49.4 (9.7) | 60.7 (15.9) | 68.8 (20.4) | 77.0 (25.0) | 76.9 (24.9) | 65.6 (18.7) | 49.3 (9.6) | 32.6 (0.3) | 20.8 (−6.2) | 47.9 (8.8) |
| Daily mean °F (°C) | 7.7 (−13.5) | 10.9 (−11.7) | 23.1 (−4.9) | 36.4 (2.4) | 47.2 (8.4) | 56.0 (13.3) | 62.4 (16.9) | 61.5 (16.4) | 50.9 (10.5) | 36.8 (2.7) | 21.9 (−5.6) | 10.7 (−11.8) | 35.5 (1.9) |
| Mean daily minimum °F (°C) | −2.6 (−19.2) | 0.0 (−17.8) | 12.2 (−11.0) | 23.5 (−4.7) | 33.6 (0.9) | 43.1 (6.2) | 47.9 (8.8) | 46.1 (7.8) | 36.3 (2.4) | 24.3 (−4.3) | 11.3 (−11.5) | 0.6 (−17.4) | 23.0 (−5.0) |
| Mean minimum °F (°C) | −27.6 (−33.1) | −21.7 (−29.8) | −12.5 (−24.7) | 9.4 (−12.6) | 21.3 (−5.9) | 33.6 (0.9) | 39.7 (4.3) | 34.5 (1.4) | 22.0 (−5.6) | 7.2 (−13.8) | −9.9 (−23.3) | −21.8 (−29.9) | −32.9 (−36.1) |
| Record low °F (°C) | −50 (−46) | −51 (−46) | −37 (−38) | −18 (−28) | 2 (−17) | 20 (−7) | 29 (−2) | 24 (−4) | 2 (−17) | −19 (−28) | −32 (−36) | −49 (−45) | −51 (−46) |
| Average precipitation inches (mm) | 0.34 (8.6) | 0.16 (4.1) | 0.32 (8.1) | 0.81 (21) | 2.08 (53) | 3.08 (78) | 2.08 (53) | 1.08 (27) | 1.10 (28) | 0.72 (18) | 0.32 (8.1) | 0.22 (5.6) | 12.31 (312.5) |
| Average snowfall inches (cm) | 7.1 (18) | 5.5 (14) | 5.2 (13) | 3.1 (7.9) | 1.2 (3.0) | 0.0 (0.0) | 0.0 (0.0) | 0.0 (0.0) | 0.2 (0.51) | 2.5 (6.4) | 6.2 (16) | 7.3 (19) | 38.3 (97.81) |
| Average extreme snow depth inches (cm) | 7.3 (19) | 6.4 (16) | 5.4 (14) | 1.7 (4.3) | 0.8 (2.0) | 0.0 (0.0) | 0.0 (0.0) | 0.0 (0.0) | 0.1 (0.25) | 1.5 (3.8) | 4.1 (10) | 4.5 (11) | 9.7 (25) |
| Average precipitation days (≥ 0.01 in) | 4.8 | 4.3 | 5.5 | 6.2 | 8.2 | 10.8 | 8.8 | 6.2 | 5.4 | 4.5 | 4.6 | 4.7 | 74 |
| Average snowy days (≥ 0.1 in) | 4.2 | 3.9 | 4.0 | 1.8 | 0.7 | 0.0 | 0.0 | 0.0 | 0.1 | 1.1 | 3.2 | 4.4 | 23.4 |
Source 1: NOAA
Source 2: National Weather Service

== Demographics ==
Historical population
| Census | Pop. | Note | %± |
|---|---|---|---|
| 1930 | 424 | | — |
| 1940 | 344 | | −18.9% |
| 1950 | 383 | | 11.3% |
| 1960 | 457 | | 19.3% |
| 1970 | 306 | | −33.0% |
| 1980 | 210 | | −31.4% |
| 1990 | 145 | | −31.0% |
| 2000 | 111 | | −23.4% |
| 2010 | 85 | | −23.4% |
| 2020 | 75 | | −11.8% |
U.S. Decennial Census

=== 2010 census ===
As of the census of 2010, there were 85 people, 47 households, and 24 families residing in the town. The population density was 404.8 inhabitants per square mile (156.3/km^{2}). There were 69 housing units at an average density of 328.6 per square mile (126.9/km^{2}). The racial makeup of the town was 97.6% White and 2.4% from two or more races.

There were 47 households, of which 12.8% had children under the age of 18 living with them, 42.6% were married couples living together, 8.5% had a female householder with no husband present, and 48.9% were non-families. 46.8% of all households were made up of individuals, and 12.8% had someone living alone who was 65 years of age or older. The average household size was 1.81 and the average family size was 2.54.

The median age in the town was 58.4 years. 11.8% of residents were under the age of 18; 3.6% were between the ages of 18 and 24; 15.4% were from 25 to 44; 42.4% were from 45 to 64; and 27.1% were 65 years of age or older. The gender makeup of the town was 45.9% male and 54.1% female.

=== 2000 census ===
As of the census of 2000, there were 111 people, 56 households, and 31 families residing in the town. The population density was 508.5 inhabitants per square mile (196.3/km^{2}). There were 83 housing units at an average density of 380.2 per square mile (146.8/km^{2}). The racial makeup of the town was 99.1% White, and 0.9% from two or more races.

There were 56 households, out of which 21.4% had children under the age of 18 living with them, 44.6% were married couples living together, 10.7% had a female householder with no husband present, and 42.9% were non-families. 41.1% of all households were made up of individuals, and 23.2% had someone living alone who was 65 years of age or older. The average household size was 1.98 and the average family size was 2.63.

In the town, the population was spread out, with 17.1% under the age of 18, 3.6% from 18 to 24, 20.7% from 25 to 44, 27.0% from 45 to 64, and 31.5% who were 65 years of age or older. The median age was 50 years. For every 100 females there were 105.6 males. For every 100 females age 18 and over, there were 100 males.

The median income for a household in the town was $24,583, and the median income for a family was $36,563. Males had a median income of $38,333 versus $25,625 for females. The per capita income for the town was $24,680. 7.2% of the population and no families were below the poverty line. none under the age of 18 and 20.7% of those 65 and older were living below the poverty line.

== Government ==
Opheim has a mayor and town council. Doug Bailey was unopposed for mayor in the November 2025 election.

== Education ==
Opheim Public School educates students from kindergarten through 12th grade. Opheim High School's team name is the Vikings.
