= Glasgow station (Montana) =

Glasgow, MT
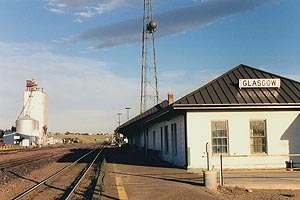
- Glasgow station platform, looking east, August 2001

General information
- Location: 424 1st Avenue South; Glasgow, Montana; United States
- Coordinates: 48.1950°N 106.6363°W
- Owner: BNSF Railway
- Line: BNSF Milk River Subdivision
- Platforms: 1 side platform
- Tracks: 4

Construction
- Parking: Yes
- Accessible: Yes

Other information
- Station code: Amtrak: GGW

History
- Opened: June 18, 1893

Passengers
- FY 2025: 3,053 (Amtrak)

Services
| Preceding station | Amtrak | Following station |
|---|---|---|
| Malta toward Seattle or Portland | Empire Builder | Wolf Point toward Chicago |
Former services
| Preceding station | Great Northern Railway | Following station |
|---|---|---|
| Paisley toward Seattle | Main Line | Whately toward St. Paul |
Location

Glasgow station is a train station in Glasgow, Montana. The station is served by Amtrak's daily Empire Builder line. The station, platform, and parking are owned by BNSF Railway.

In 2005, Glasgow saw 4.5% of Montana's twelve passenger stations’ total traffic.

== Bibliography ==
- Allen, W.F. (1893). Travelers Official Guide of the Railway and Steam Navigation Lines in the United States and Canada. New York, New York: National Railway Publication Company.
