= List of places in Montana =

The following is a list of places in Montana.

== A ==
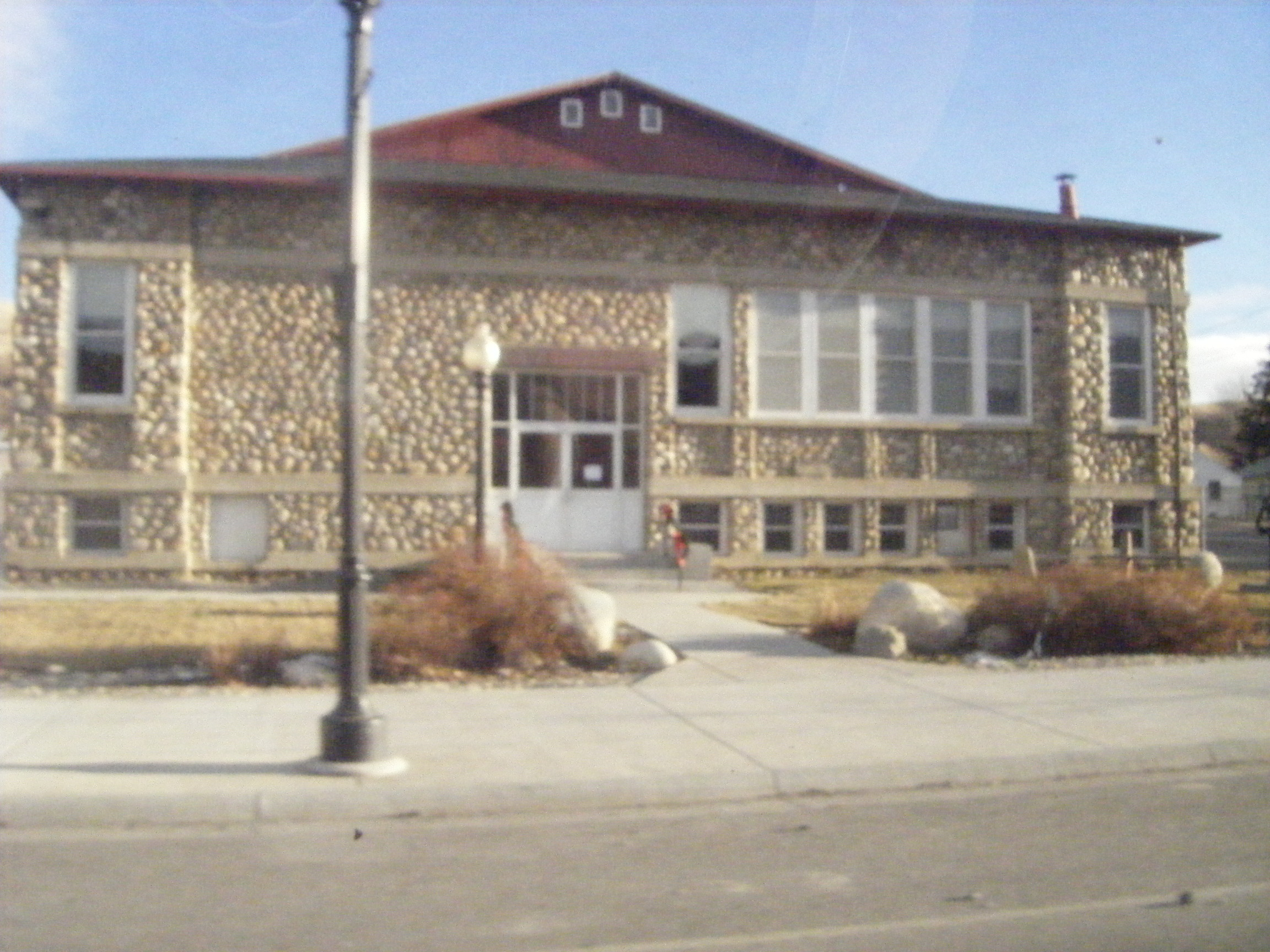
Cobblestone School Absarokee, Montana

Name of place	Number of counties	Principal county	ZIP code	
Name of place	Number of counties	Principal county	Lower	Upper
Absarokee	1	Stillwater County	59001	
Acton	1	Yellowstone County	59002	
Alberton	1	Mineral County	59820	
Alder	1	Madison County	59710	
Alzada	1	Carter County	59311	
Amsterdam	1	Gallatin County		
Anaconda	1	Deer Lodge County	59711	
Angela	1	Rosebud County	59312	
Antelope	1	Sheridan County	59211	
Arlee	1	Lake County	59821	
Ashland	1	Rosebud County	59003	59004
Augusta	1	Lewis and Clark	59410	
Avon	1	Powell County	59713	

== B ==
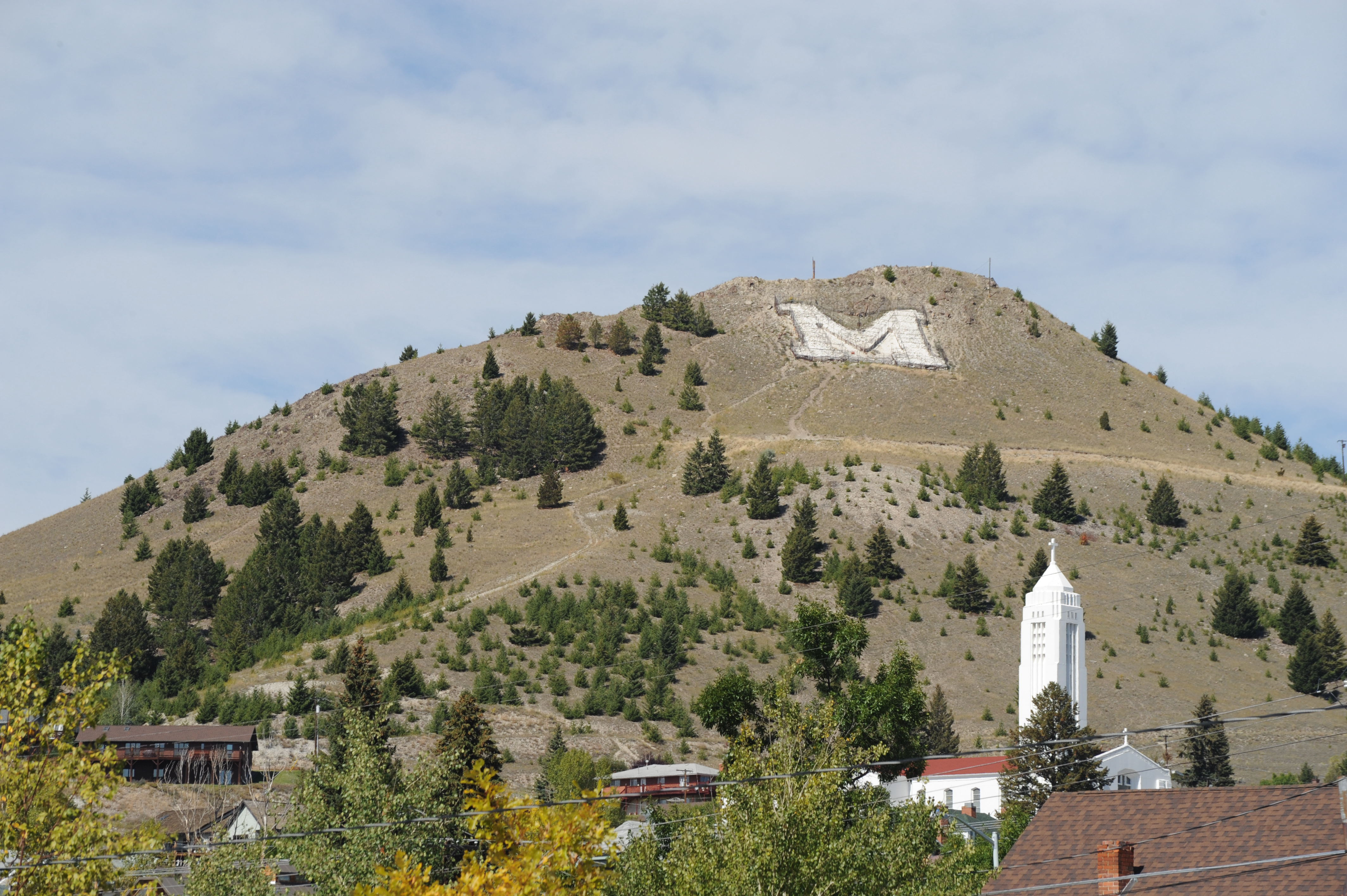
Butte "M"

Name of place	Number of counties	Principal county	ZIP code	
Name of place	Number of counties	Principal county	Lower	Upper
Babb	1	Glacier County	59411	
Bainville	1	Roosevelt County	59212	
Baker	1	Fallon County	59313	
Ballantine	1	Yellowstone County	59006	
Bannack	1	Beaverhead County		
Basin	1	Jefferson County	59631	
Bearcreek	1	Carbon County	59007	
Belfry	1	Carbon County	59008	
Belgrade	1	Gallatin County	59714	
Belt	1	Cascade County	59412	
Biddle	1	Powder River County	59314	
Big Arm	1	Lake County	59910	
Big Sandy	1	Chouteau County	59520	
Big Sky	1	Gallatin County	59716	
Big Timber	1	Sweet Grass County	59011	
Bigfork	1	Flathead County	59911	
Bighorn	1	Treasure County	59010	
Billings	1	Yellowstone County	59101	59117
Birney	1	Rosebud County	59012	
Black Eagle	1	Cascade County	59414	
Bloomfield	1	Dawson County	59315	
Bonner	1	Missoula County	59823	
Boulder	1	Jefferson County	59632	
Box Elder	1	Hill County	59521	
Boyd	1	Carbon County	59013	
Boyes	1	Carter County	59316	
Bozeman	1	Gallatin County	59715, 59717–59719	59771–59773
Brady	1	Pondera County	59416	
Bridger	1	Carbon County	59014	
Broadus	1	Powder River County	59317	
Broadview	1	Yellowstone County	59015	
Brockton	1	Roosevelt County	59213	
Brockway	1	McCone County	59214	
Browning	1	Glacier County	59417	
Brusett	1	Garfield County	59318	
Buffalo	1	Fergus County	59418	
Busby	1	Big Horn County	59016	
Butte	1	Silver Bow County	59701	59707
Bynum	1	Teton County	59419	

== C ==
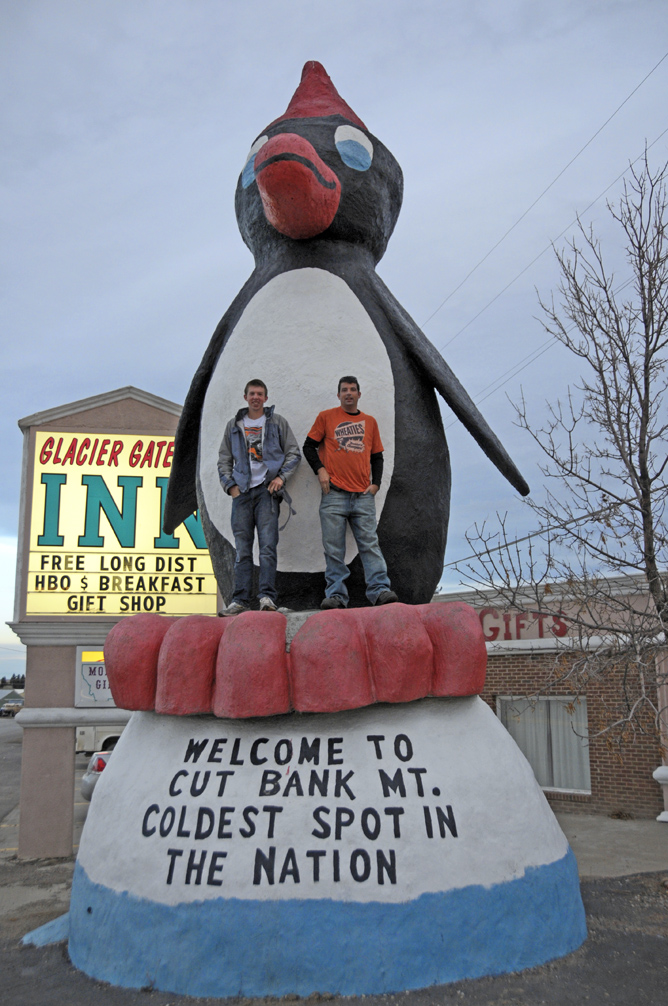
Cut Bank

Name of place	Number of counties	Principal county	ZIP code	
Name of place	Number of counties	Principal county	Lower	Upper
Cameron	1	Madison County	59720	
Canyon Creek	1	Lewis and Clark County	59633	
Capitol	1	Carter County	59319	
Cardwell	1	Jefferson County	59721	
Carter	1	Chouteau County	59420	
Cascade	1	Cascade County	59421	
Charlo	1	Lake County	59824	
Chester	1	Liberty County	59522	
Chinook	1	Blaine County	59523	
Choteau	1	Teton County	59422	
Circle	1	McCone County	59215	
Clancy	1	Jefferson County	59634	
Clinton	1	Missoula County	59825	
Clyde Park	1	Park County	59018	
Coffee Creek	1	Fergus County	59424	
Cohagen	1	Garfield County	59322	
Colstrip	1	Rosebud County	59323	
Columbia Falls	1	Flathead County	59912	
Columbus	1	Stillwater County	59019	
Condon	1	Missoula County	59826	
Conner	1	Ravalli County	59827	
Conrad	1	Pondera County	59425	
Cooke City	1	Park County	59020	
Coram	1	Flathead County	59913	
Corvallis	1	Ravalli County	59828	
Crane	1	Richland County	59217	
Crow Agency	1	Big Horn County	59022	
Culbertson	1	Roosevelt County	59218	
Custer	1	Yellowstone County	59024	
Cut Bank	1	Glacier County	59427	

== D ==
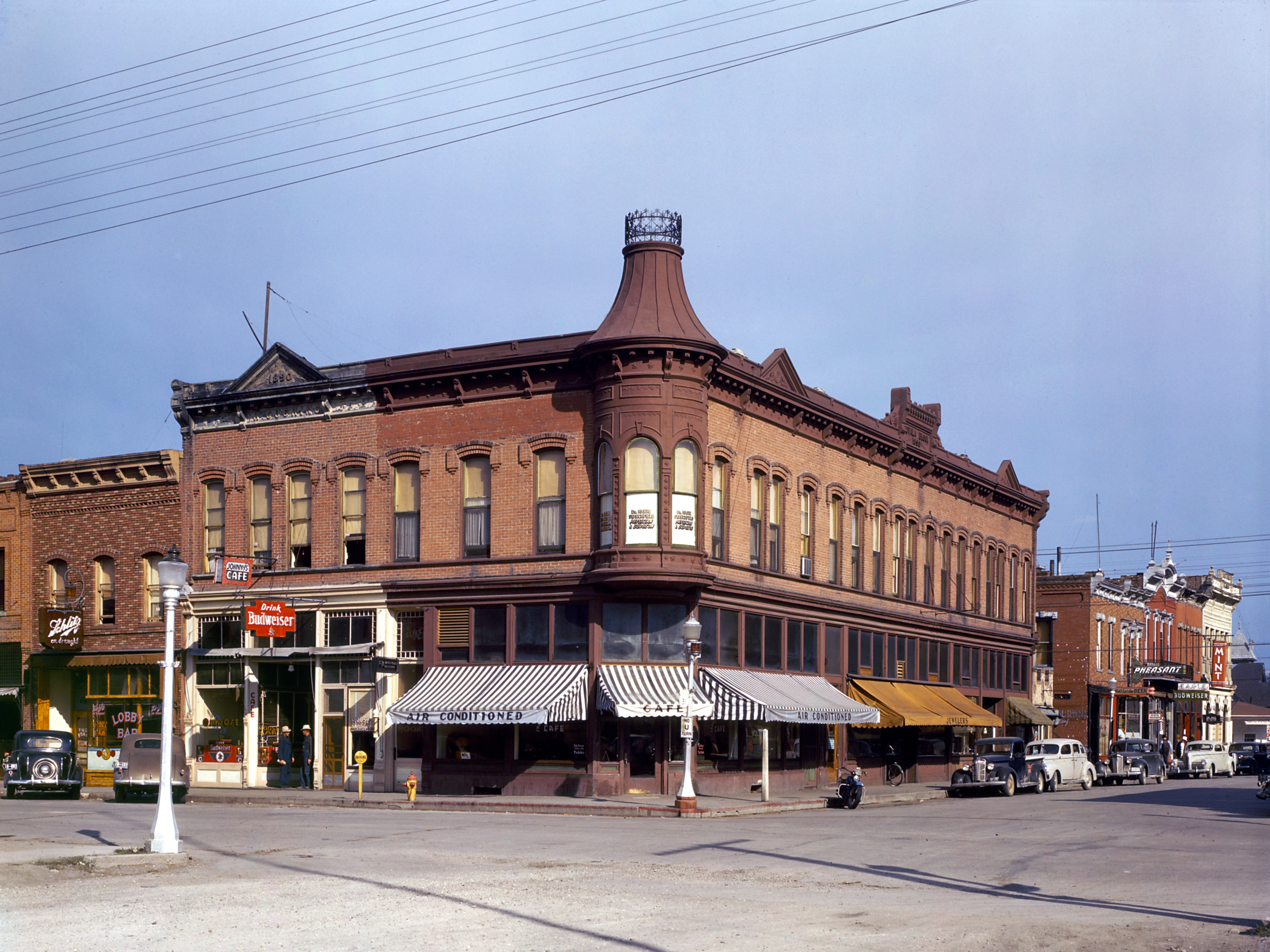
Dillon, Montana, August 1942

Name of place	Number of counties	Principal county	ZIP code	
Name of place	Number of counties	Principal county	Lower	Upper
Dagmar	1	Sheridan County	59219	
Darby	1	Ravalli County	59829	
De Borgia	1	Mineral County	59830	
Decker	1	Big Horn County	59025	
Deer Lodge	1	Powell County	59722	
Dell	1	Beaverhead County	59724	
Denton	1	Fergus County	59430	
Dillon	1	Beaverhead County	59725	
Divide	1	Silver Bow County	59727	
Dodson	1	Phillips County	59524	
Drummond	1	Granite County	59832	
Dupuyer	1	Pondera County	59432	
Dutton	1	Teton County	59433	

== E ==
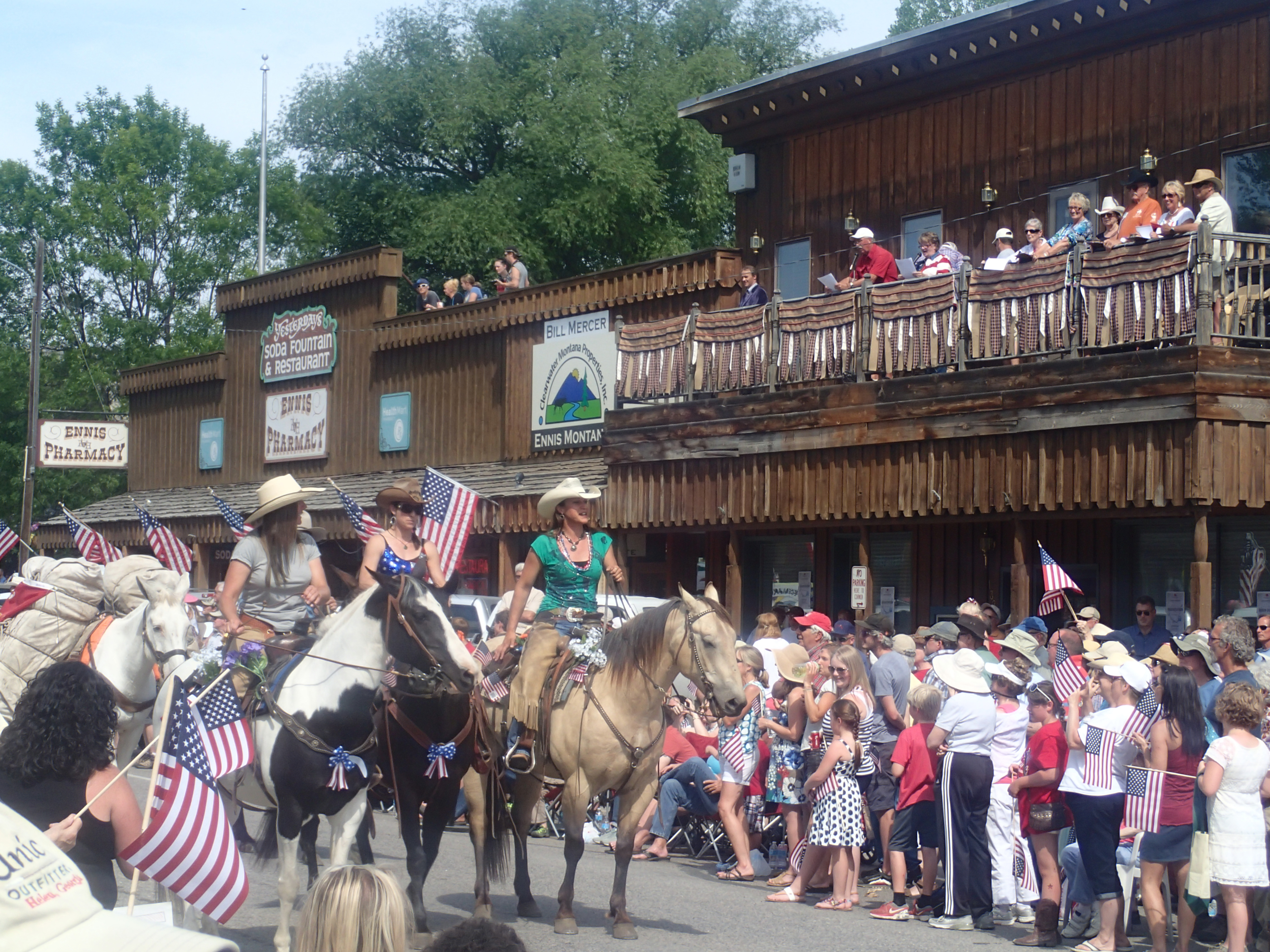
July 4th Parade in Ennis

Name of place	Number of counties	Principal county	ZIP code	
Name of place	Number of counties	Principal county	Lower	Upper
East Glacier Park	1	Glacier County	59434	
East Helena	1	Lewis and Clark County	59635	
Edgar	1	Carbon County	59026	
Ekalaka	1	Carter County	59324	
Elliston	1	Powell County	59728	
Elmo	1	Lake County	59915	
Emigrant	1	Park County	59027	
Ennis	1	Madison County	59729	
Essex	1	Flathead County	59916	
Ethridge	1	Toole County	59435	
Eureka	1	Lincoln County	59917	
Evergreen	1	Flathead County		

== F ==
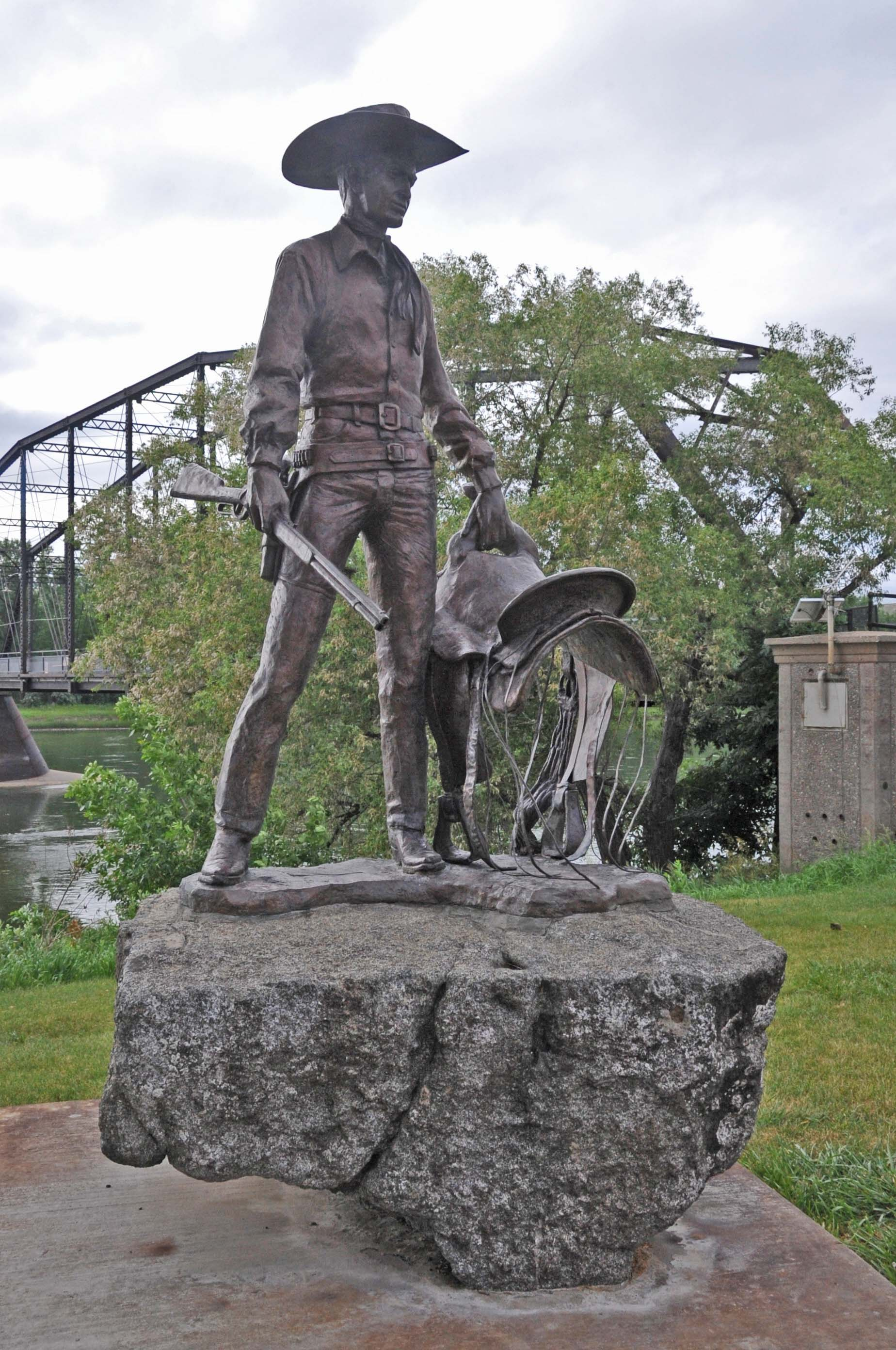
Riders of the Purple Sage in Fort Benton

Name of place	Number of counties	Principal county	ZIP code	
Name of place	Number of counties	Principal county	Lower	Upper
Fairfield	1	Teton County	59436	
Fairview	1	Richland County	59221	
Fallon	1	Prairie County	59326	
Fishtail	1	Stillwater County	59028	
Flaxville	1	Daniels County	59222	
Florence	1	Ravalli County	59833	
Floweree	1	Chouteau County	59440	
Forest Grove	1	Fergus County	59441	
Forsyth	1	Rosebud County	59327	
Fort Benton	1	Chouteau County	59442	
Fort Harrison	1	Lewis and Clark County	59636	
Fort Peck	1	Valley County	59223	
Fort Shaw	1	Cascade County	59443	
Fortine	1	Lincoln County	59918	
Frazer	1	Valley County	59225	
Frenchtown	1	Missoula County	59834	
Froid	1	Roosevelt County	59226	
Fromberg	1	Carbon County	59029	
Four Corners	1	Gallatin County		

== G ==
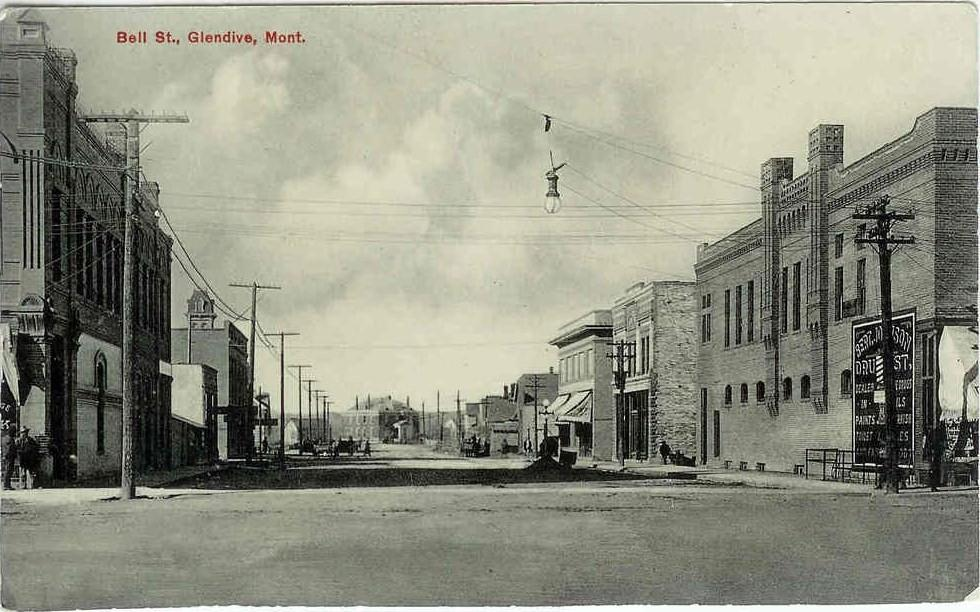
Glendive 1913

Name of place	Number of counties	Principal county	ZIP code	
Name of place	Number of counties	Principal county	Lower	Upper
Galata	1	Toole County	59444	
Gallatin Gateway	1	Gallatin County	59730	
Gardiner	1	Park County	59030	
Garrison	1	Powell County	59731	
Garryowen	1	Big Horn County	59031	
Geraldine	1	Chouteau County	59446	
Geyser	1	Judith Basin County	59447	
Gildford	1	Hill County	59525	
Glasgow	1	Valley County	59230	
Glen	1	Beaverhead County	59732	
Glendive	1	Dawson County	59330	
Glentana	1	Valley County	59240	
Gold Creek	1	Powell County	59733	
Grantsdale	1	Ravalli County	59835	
Grass Range	1	Fergus County	59032	
Great Falls	1	Cascade County	59401	59406
Greycliff	1	Sweet Grass County	59033	

== H ==
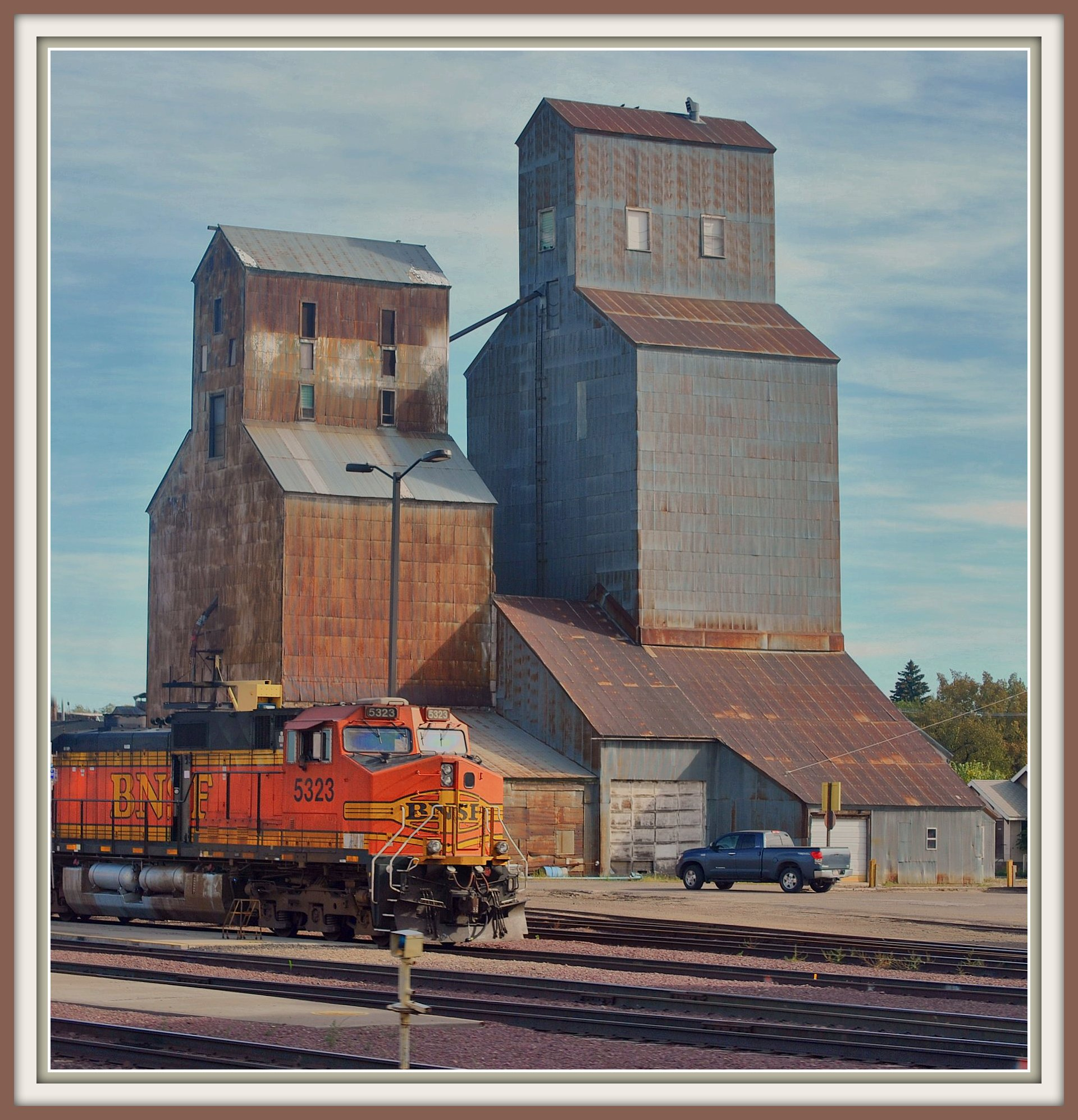
Havre elevator

Name of place	Number of counties	Principal county	ZIP code	
Name of place	Number of counties	Principal county	Lower	Upper
Hall	1	Granite County	59837	
Hamilton	1	Ravalli County	59840	
Hammond	1	Carter County	59332	
Hardin	1	Big Horn County	59034	
Harlem	1	Blaine County	59526	
Harlowton	1	Wheatland County	59036	
Harrison	1	Madison County	59735	
Hathaway	1	Rosebud County	59333	
Haugan	1	Mineral County	59842	
Havre	1	Hill County	59501	
Hays	1	Blaine County	59527	
Heart Butte	1	Pondera County	59448	
Helena	1	Lewis and Clark County	59601–59604	59620–59626
Helmville	1	Powell County	59843	
Heron	1	Sanders County	59844	
Highwood	1	Chouteau County	59450	
Hilger	1	Fergus County	59451	
Hingham	1	Hill County	59528	
Hinsdale	1	Valley County	59241	
Hobson	1	Judith Basin County	59452	
Hogeland	1	Blaine County	59529	
Homestead	1	Sheridan County	59242	
Hot Springs	1	Sanders County	59845	
Hungry Horse	1	Flathead County	59919	
Huntley	1	Yellowstone County	59037	
Huson	1	Missoula County	59846	
Hysham	1	Treasure County	59038	

== I ==
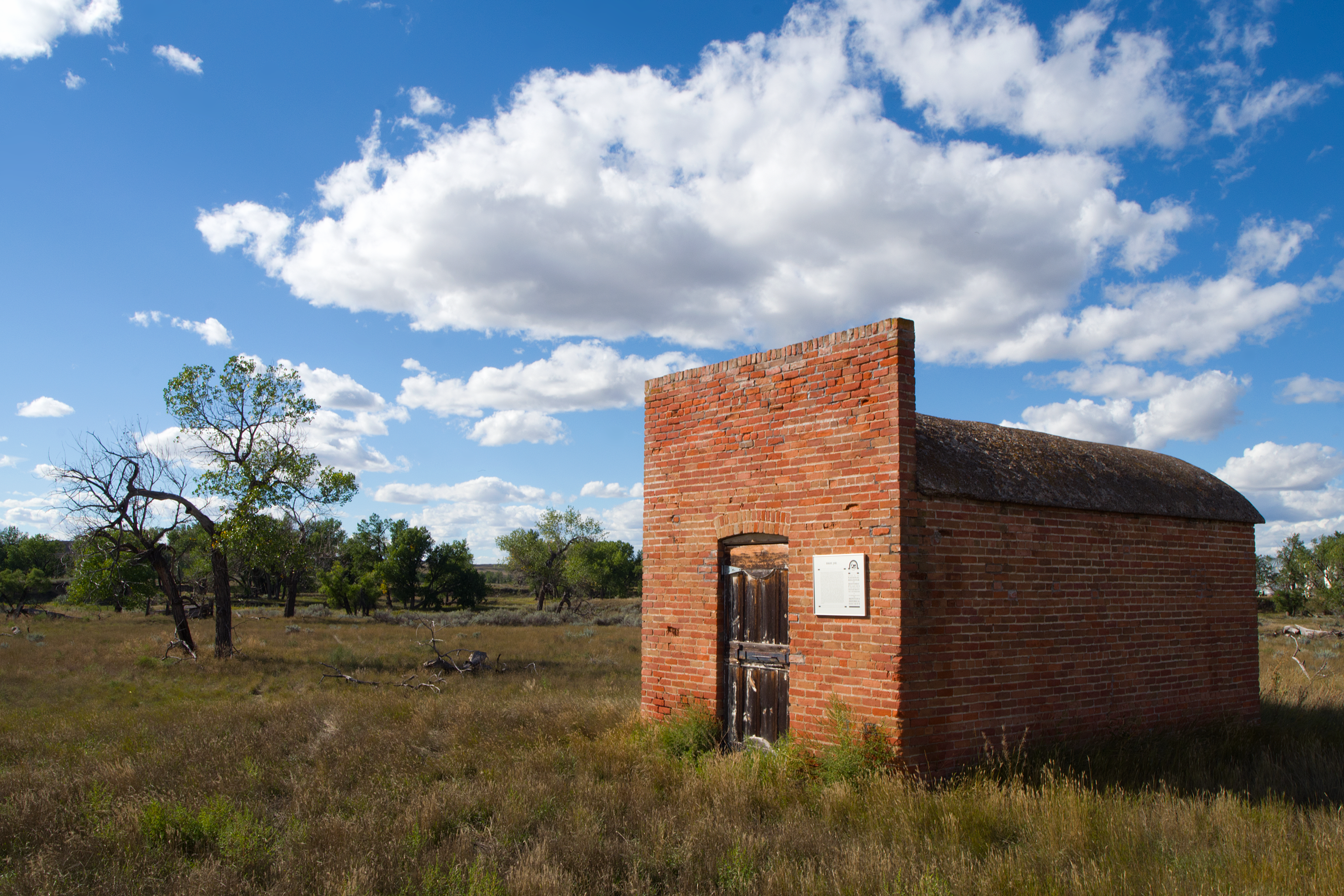
Ismay Jail, a National Registered Historic Place

Name of place	Number of counties	Principal county	ZIP code	
Name of place	Number of counties	Principal county	Lower	Upper
Ingomar	1	Rosebud County	59039	
Inverness	1	Hill County	59530	
Ismay	1	Custer County	59336	

== J ==
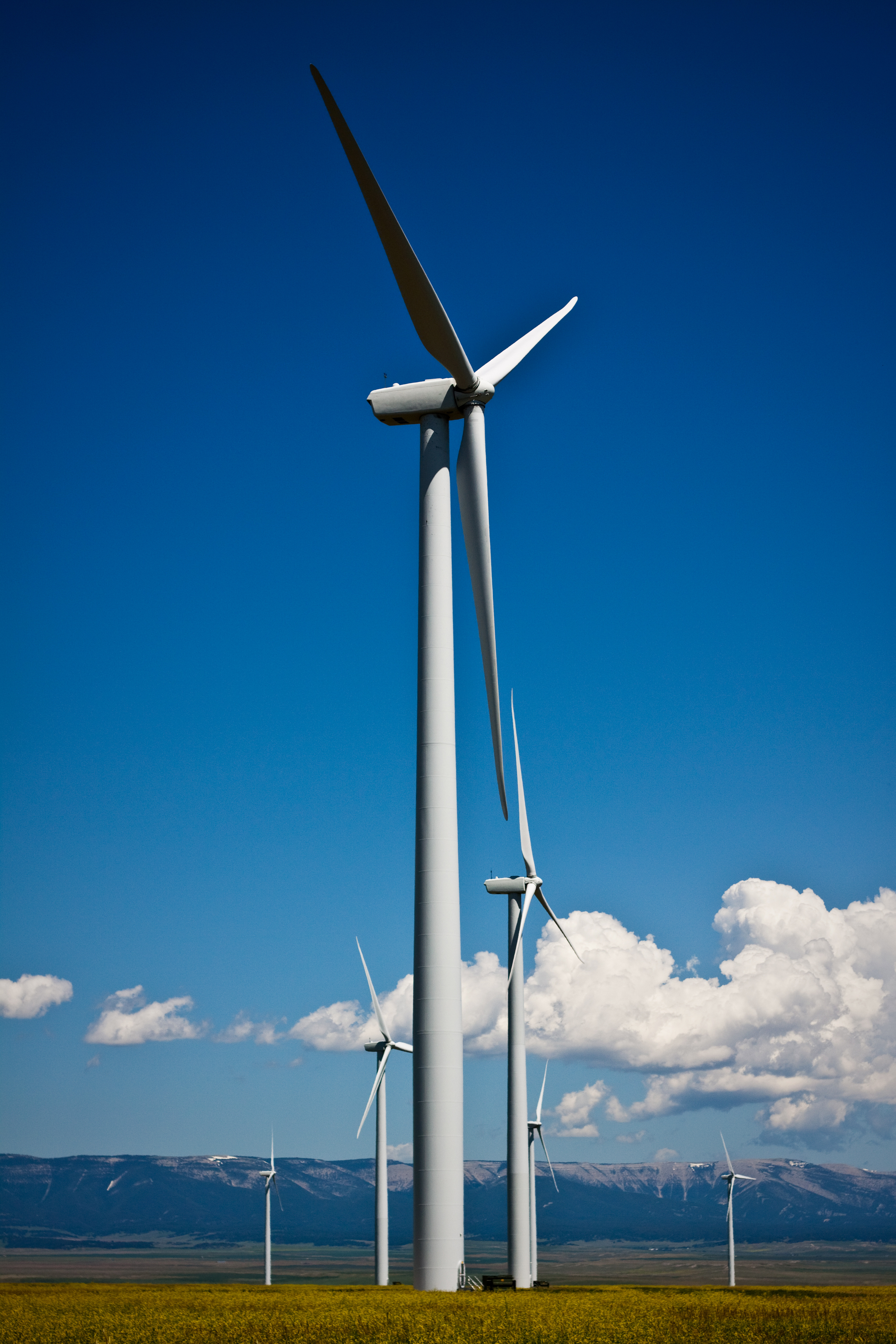
Judith Gap Wind Farm

Name of place	Number of counties	Principal county	ZIP code	
Name of place	Number of counties	Principal county	Lower	Upper
Jackson	1	Beaverhead County	59736	
Jefferson City	1	Jefferson County	59638	
Joliet	1	Carbon County	59041	
Joplin	1	Liberty County	59531	
Jordan	1	Garfield County	59337	
Judith Gap	1	Wheatland County	59453	

== K ==
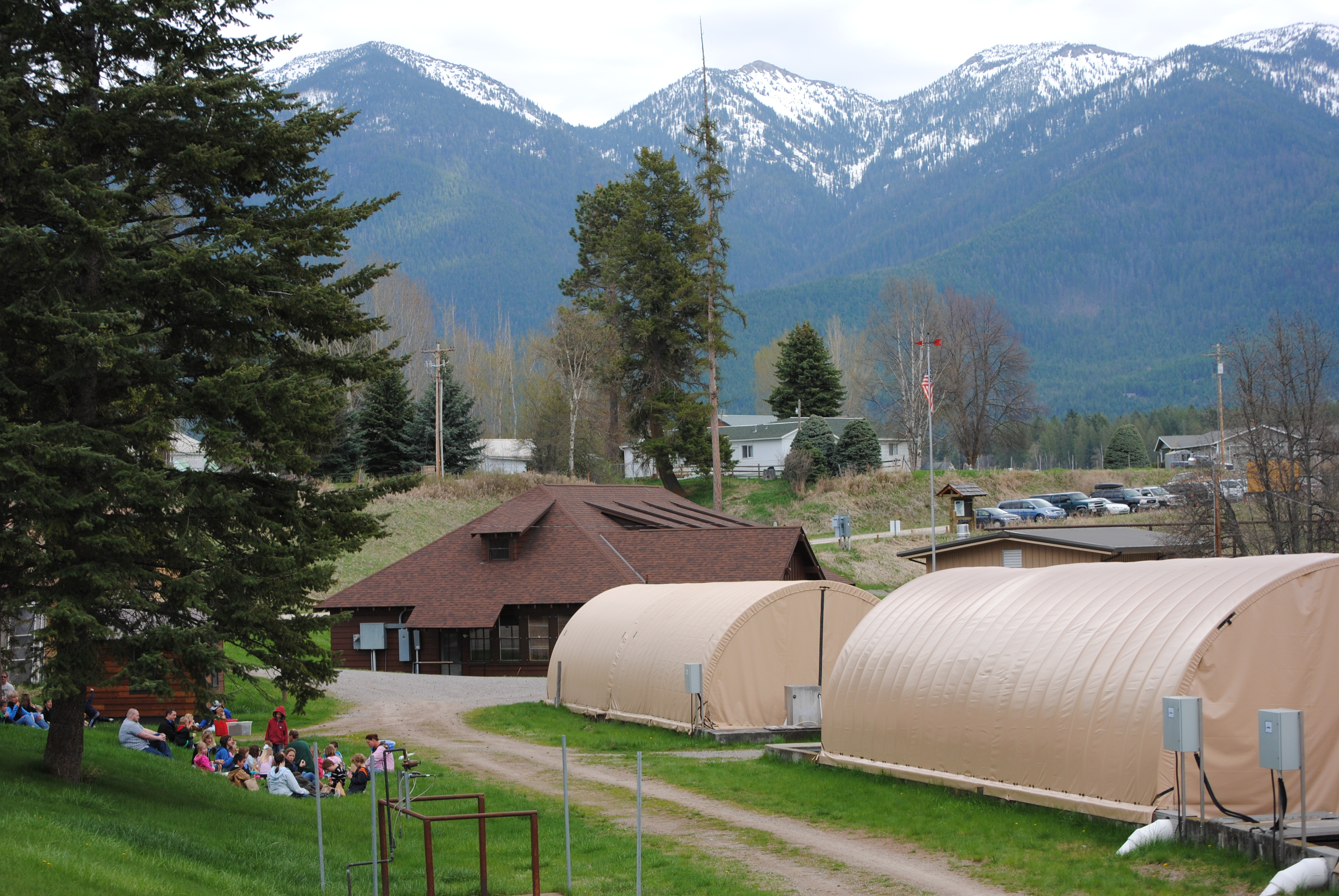
Creston National Fish Hatchery near Kalispell

Name of place	Number of counties	Principal county	ZIP code	
Name of place	Number of counties	Principal county	Lower	Upper
Kalispell	1	Flathead County	59901	59904
Kevin	1	Toole County	59454	
Kila	1	Flathead County	59920	
Kinsey	1	Custer County	59338	
Kremlin	1	Hill County	59532	

== L ==
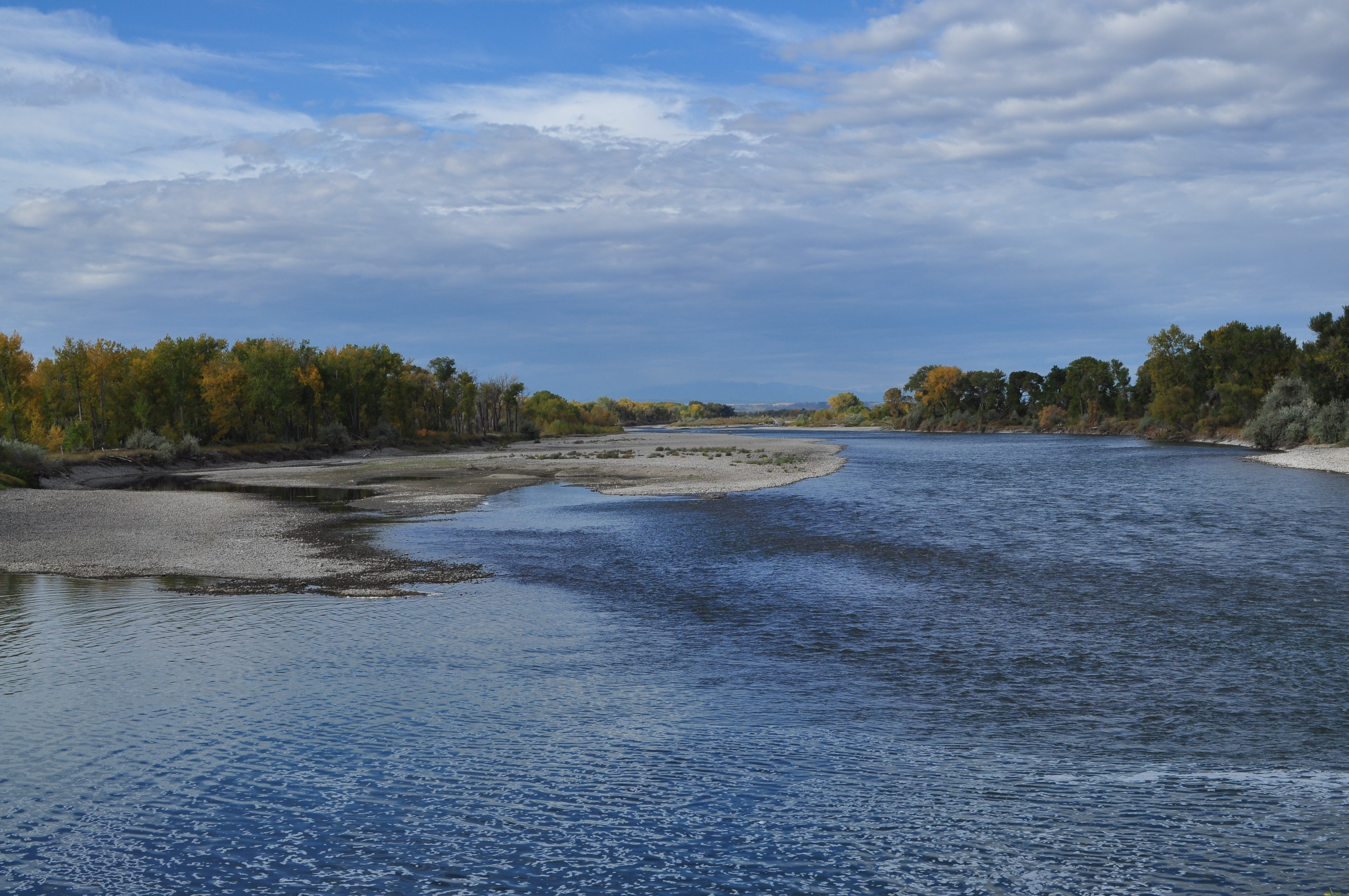
Yellowstone River near Laurel

Name of place	Number of counties	Principal county	ZIP code	
Name of place	Number of counties	Principal county	Lower	Upper
Lake McDonald	1	Flathead County	59921	
Lakeside	1	Flathead County	59922	
Lakeview	1	Beaverhead County		
Lambert	1	Richland County	59243	
Lame Deer	1	Rosebud County	59043	
Larslan	1	Valley County	59244	
Laurel	1	Yellowstone County	59044	
Lavina	1	Golden Valley County	59046	
Ledger	1	Pondera County	59456	
Lewistown	1	Fergus County	59457	
Libby	1	Lincoln County	59923	
Lima	1	Beaverhead County	59739	
Lincoln	1	Lewis and Clark County	59639	
Lindsay	1	Dawson County	59339	
Livingston	1	Park County	59047	
Lloyd	1	Blaine County	59535	
Lockwood	1	Yellowstone County		
Lodge Grass	1	Big Horn County	59050	
Lolo	1	Missoula County	59847	
Loma	1	Chouteau County	59460	
Lonepine	1	Sanders County	59848	
Loring	1	Phillips County	59537	
Lothair	1	Liberty County	59461	

== M ==
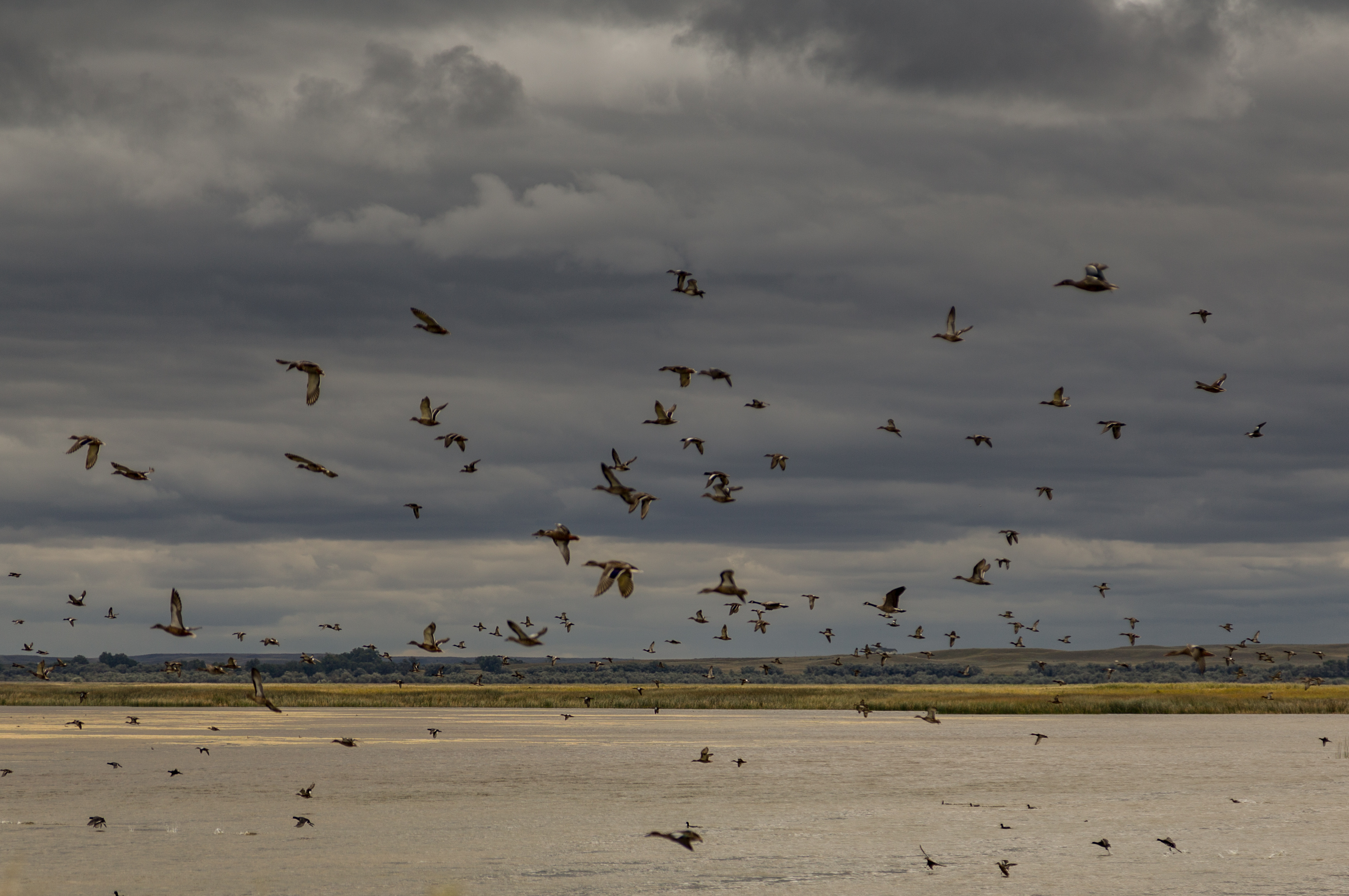
Bowdoin National Wildlife Refuge near Malta

Name of place	Number of counties	Principal county	ZIP code	
Name of place	Number of counties	Principal county	Lower	Upper
Malmstrom AFB	1	Cascade County	59402	
Malta	1	Phillips County	59538	
Manhattan	1	Gallatin County	59741	
Marion	1	Flathead County	59925	
Martin City	1	Flathead County	59926	
Martinsdale	1	Meagher County	59053	
Marysville	1	Lewis and Clark County	59640	
McAllister	1	Madison County	59740	
McLeod	1	Sweet Grass County	59052	
Medicine Lake	1	Sheridan County	59247	
Melrose	1	Silver Bow County	59743	
Melstone	1	Musselshell County	59054	
Melville	1	Sweet Grass County	59341	
Mildred	1	Prairie County	59341	
Miles City	1	Custer County	59301	
Milltown	1	Missoula County	59851	
Missoula	1	Missoula County	59801–59808	59812
Moccasin	1	Judith Basin County	59462	
Molt	1	Yellowstone County	59057	
Monarch	1	Cascade County	59463	
Monida	1	Beaverhead County		
Moore	1	Fergus County	59464	
Mosby	1	Garfield County	59058	
Musselshell	1	Musselshell County	59059	

== N ==
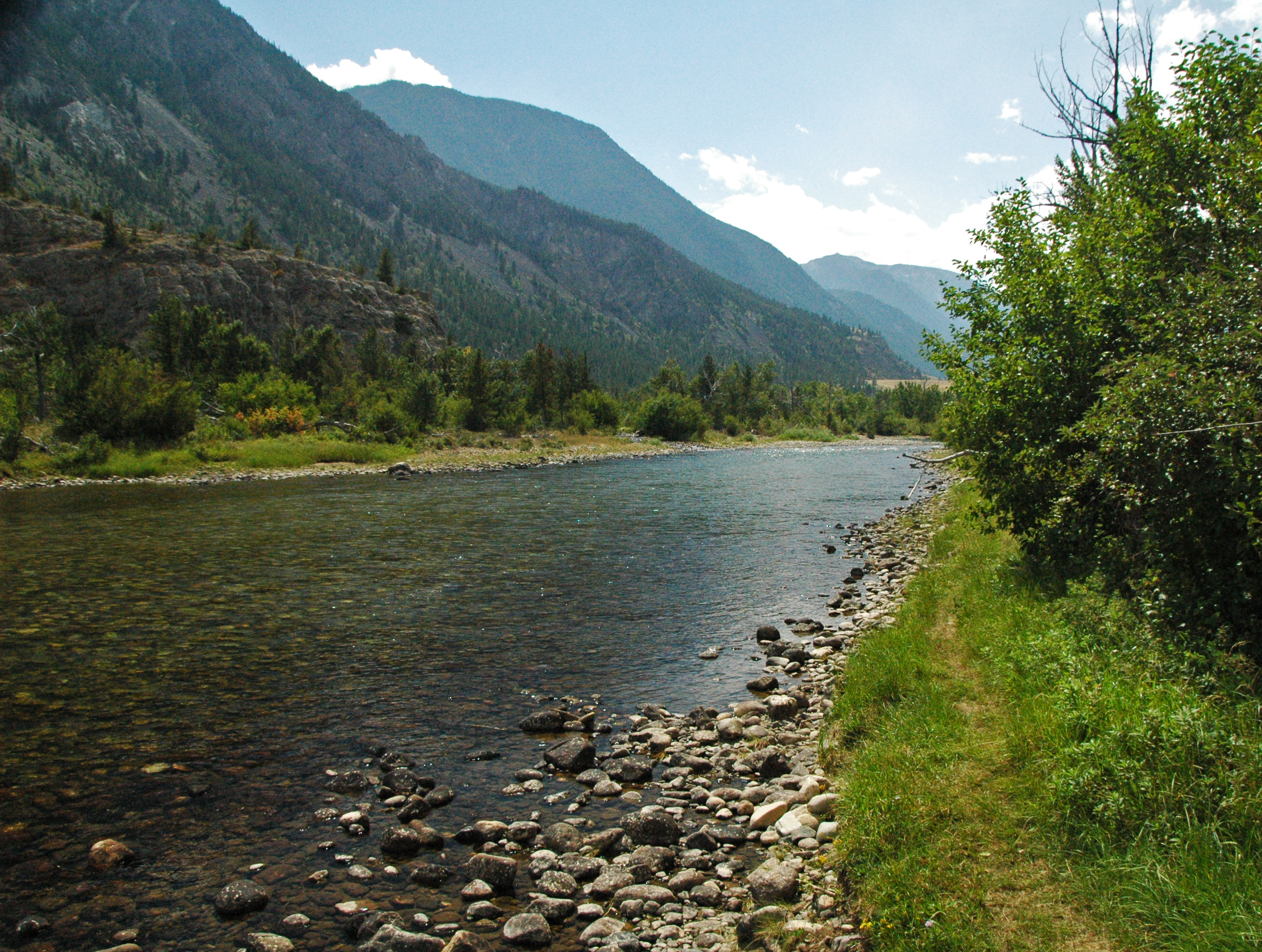
Stillwater River near Nye

Name of place	Number of counties	Principal county	ZIP code	
Name of place	Number of counties	Principal county	Lower	Upper
Nashua	1	Valley County	59248	
Neihart	1	Cascade County	59465	
Norris	1	Madison County	59745	
Noxon	1	Sanders County	59853	
Nye	1	Stillwater County	59061	

== O ==
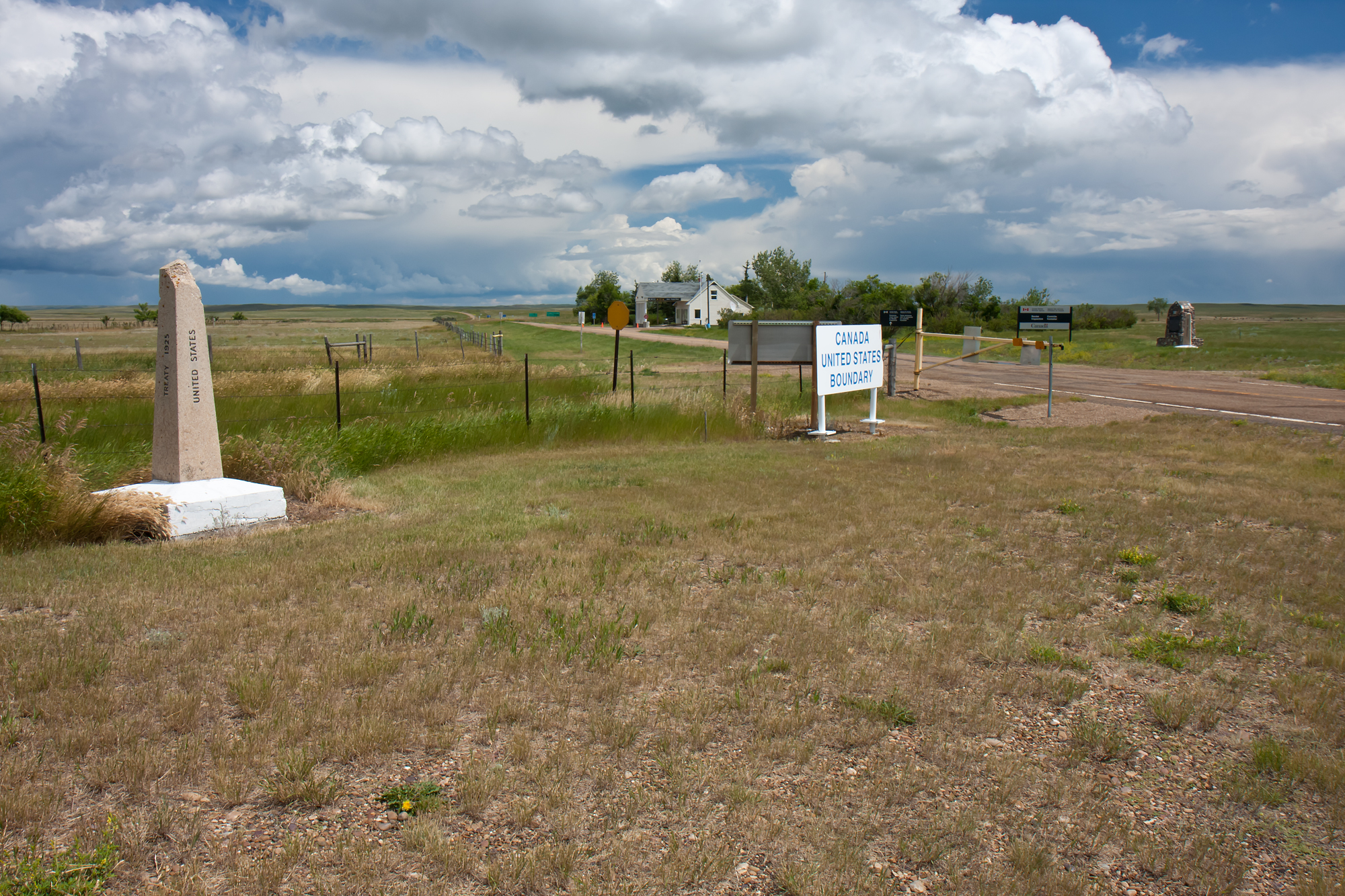
Border near Opheim

== P ==
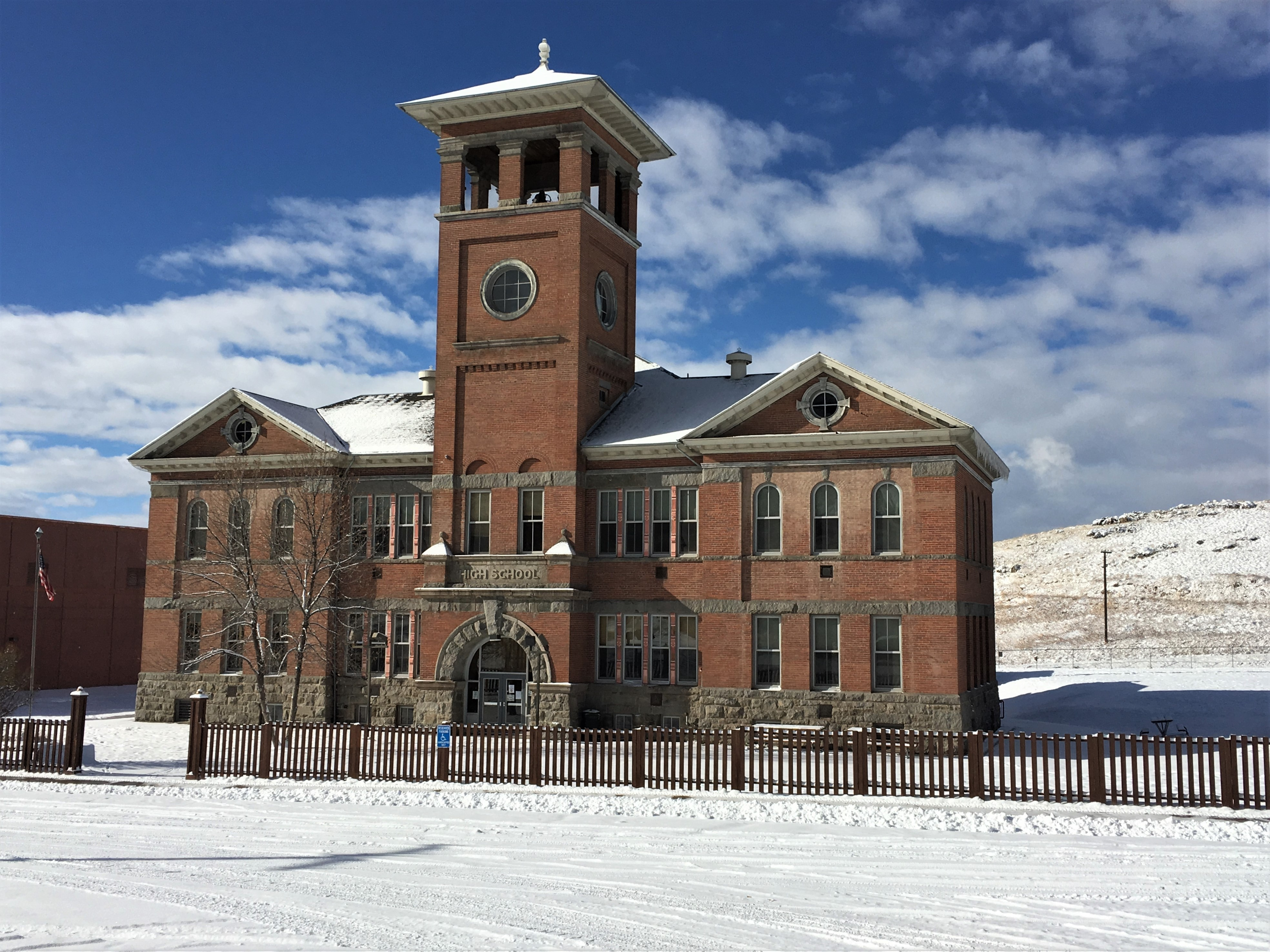
School in Philipsburg

Name of place	Number of counties	Principal county	ZIP code	
Name of place	Number of counties	Principal county	Lower	Upper
Pablo	1	Lake County	59855	
Paradise	1	Sanders County	59856	
Park City	1	Stillwater County	59063	
Peerless	1	Daniels County	59253	
Pendroy	1	Teton County	59467	
Philipsburg	1	Granite County	59858	
Pinesdale	1	Ravalli County	59841	
Plains	1	Sanders	59859	
Plentywood	1	Sheridan County	59254	
Plevna	1	Fallon County	59344	
Polaris	1	Beaverhead County	59746	
Polebridge	1	Flathead County	59928	
Polson	1	Lake County	59860	
Pompeys Pillar	1	Yellowstone County	59064	
Pony	1	Madison County	59747	
Poplar	1	Roosevelt County	59255	
Powderville	1	Powder River County	59345	
Power	1	Teton County	59468	
Pray	1	Park County	59065	
Proctor	1	Lake County	59929	
Pryor	1	Big Horn County	59066	

== Q ==
Name of place	Number of counties	Principal county	ZIP code	
Name of place	Number of counties	Principal county	Lower	Upper
Quietus	1	Big Horn County	59027	

== R ==
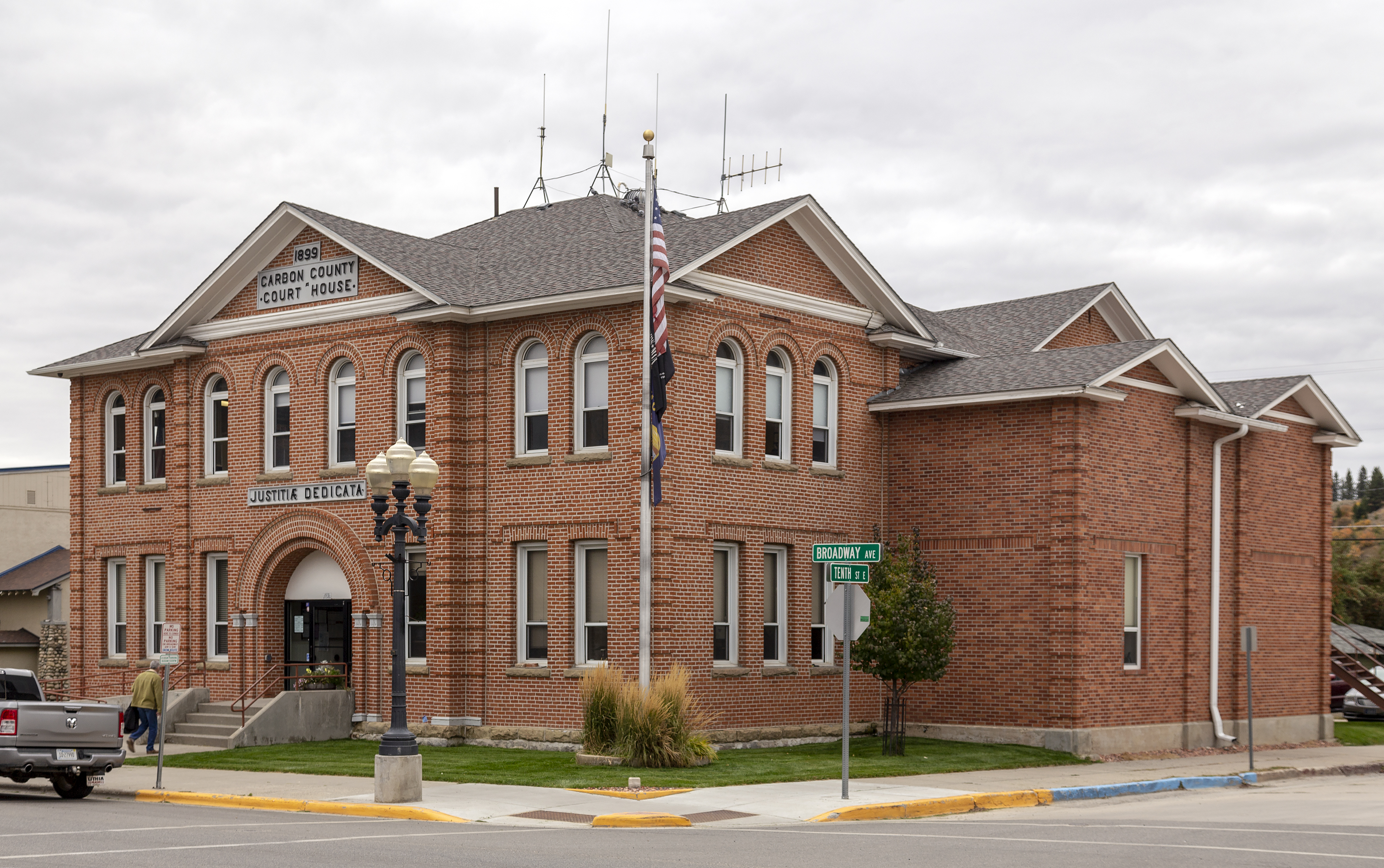
County Courthouse in Red Lodge

Name of place	Number of counties	Principal county	ZIP code	
Name of place	Number of counties	Principal county	Lower	Upper
Radersburg	1	Broadwater County	59641	
Ramsay	1	Silver Bow County	59748	
Rapelje	1	Stillwater County	59067	
Ravalli	1	Lake County	59863	
Raymond	1	Sheridan County	59256	
Raynesford	1	Judith Basin County	59469	
Red Lodge	1	Carbon County	59068	
Redstone	1	Sheridan County	59257	
Reed Point	1	Stillwater County	59069	
Reserve	1	Sheridan County	59258	
Rexford	1	Lincoln County	59930	
Richey	1	Dawson County	59259	
Richland	1	Valley County	59260	
Ringling	1	Meagher County	59642	
Roberts	1	Carbon County	59070	
Rollins	1	Lake County	59931	
Ronan	1	Lake County	59864	
Roscoe	1	Carbon County	59071	
Rosebud	1	Rosebud County	59347	
Roundup	1	Musselshell County	59072	59073
Roy	1	Fergus County	59471	
Rudyard	1	Hill County	59540	
Ryegate	1	Golden Valley County	59074	

== S ==
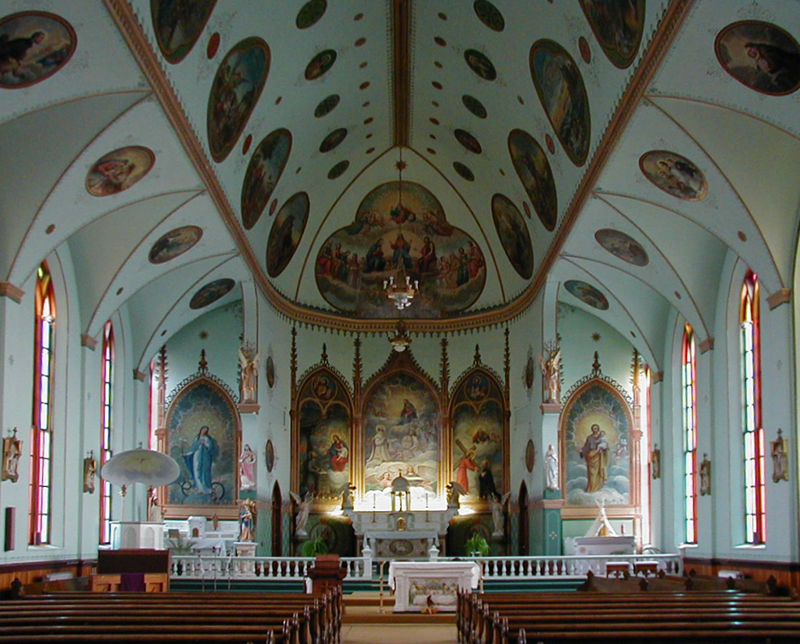
Interior of the St. Ignatius Mission

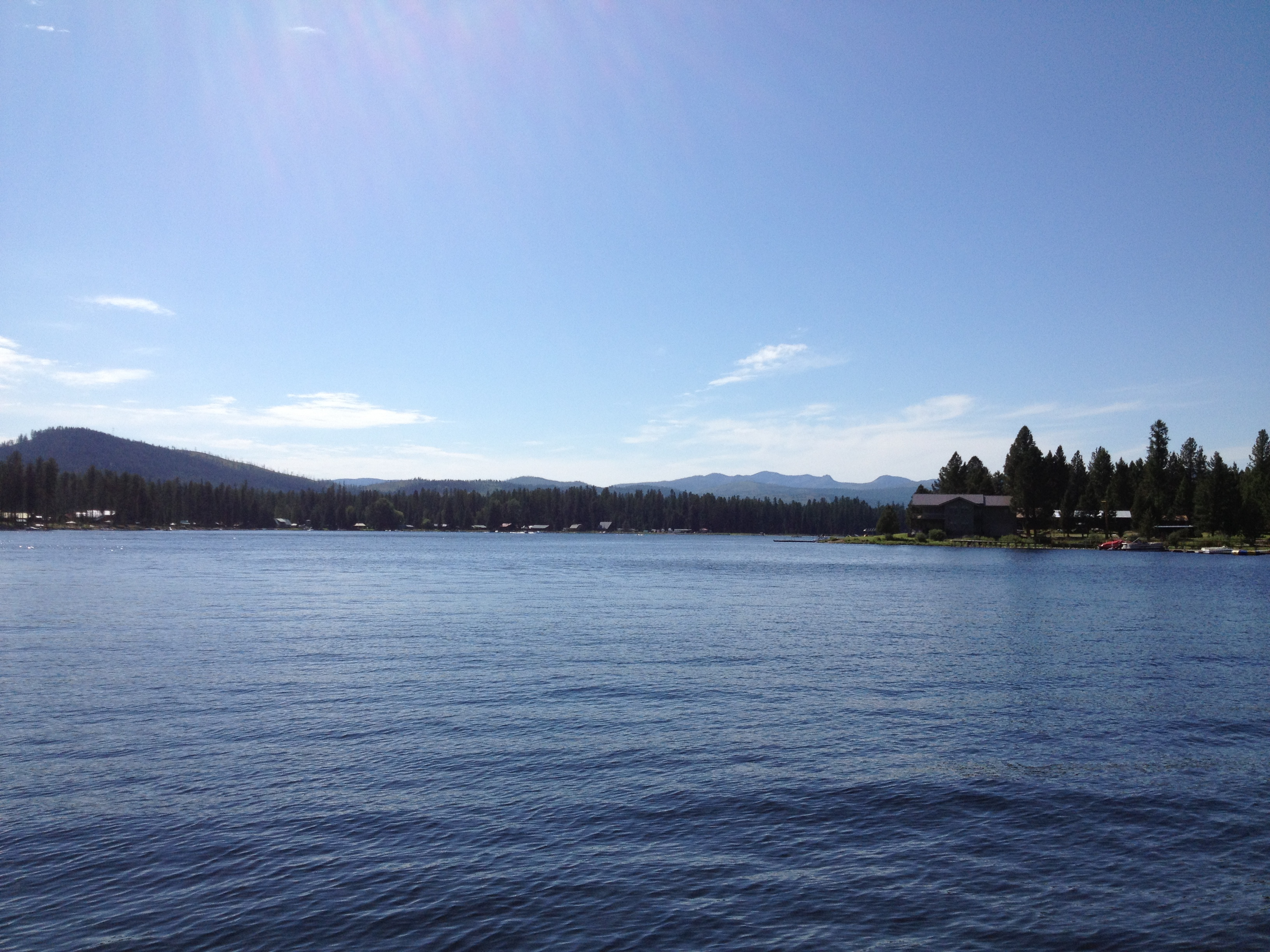
Seeley Lake

Name of place	Number of counties	Principal county	ZIP code	
Name of place	Number of counties	Principal county	Lower	Upper
Saco	1	Phillips County	59261	
St. Ignatius	1	Lake County	59865	
St. Marie	1	Valley County	59231	
St. Regis	1	Mineral County	59866	
St. Xavier	1	Big Horn County	59075	
Saltese	1	Mineral County	59867	
Sand Coulee	1	Cascade County	59472	
Sand Springs	1	Garfield County	59077	
Sanders	1	Treasure County	59067	
Savage	1	Richland County	59262	
Sčilíp	1	Sanders County	59831	
Scobey	1	Daniels County	59263	
Seeley Lake	1	Missoula County	59868	
Shawmut	1	Wheatland County	59078	
Shelby	1	Toole County	59474	
Shepherd	1	Yellowstone County	59079	
Sheridan	1	Madison County	59749	
Sidney	1	Richland County	59270	
Silver Gate	1	Park County	59081	
Silver Star	1	Madison County	59751	
Simms	1	Cascade County	59477	
Somers	1	Flathead County	59932	
Springdale	1	Park County	59082	
Stanford	1	Judith Basin County	59479	
Stevensville	1	Ravalli County	59870	
Stockett	1	Cascade County	59480	
Stryker	1	Lincoln County	59933	
Sula	1	Ravalli County	59871	
Sumatra	1	Rosebud County	59083	
Sun River	1	Cascade County	59483	
Sunburst	1	Toole County	59482	
Superior	1	Mineral County	59872	
Sweet Grass	1	Toole County	59484	

== T ==
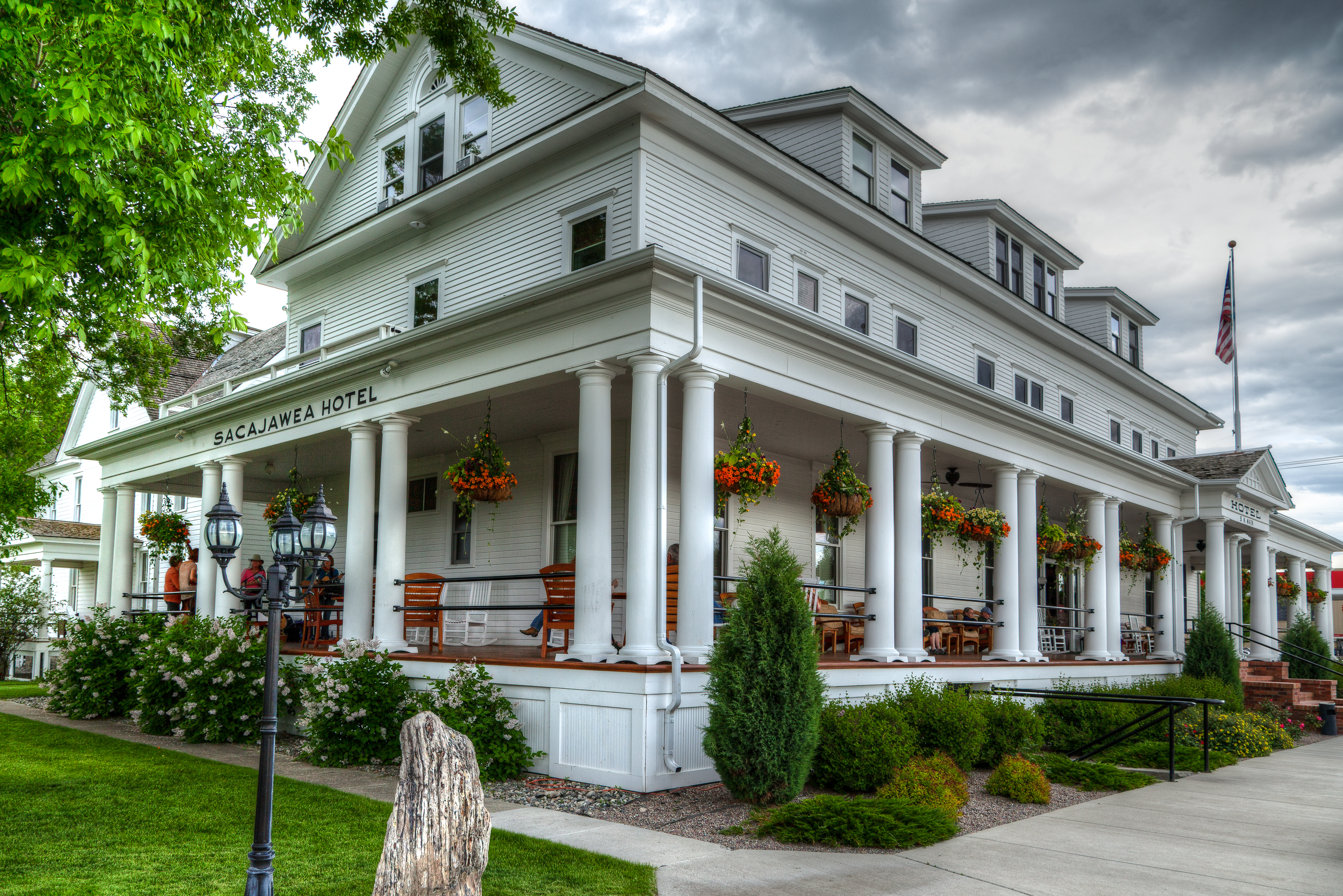
Sacajawea Hotel in Three Forks

Name of place	Number of counties	Principal county	ZIP code	
Name of place	Number of counties	Principal county	Lower	Upper
Teigen	1	Petroleum County	59084	
Terry	1	Prairie County	59349	
Thompson Falls	1	Sanders County	59873	
Three Forks	1	Gallatin County	59752	
Toston	1	Broadwater County	59643	
Townsend	1	Broadwater County	59644	
Trego	1	Lincoln County	59934	
Trout Creek	1	Sanders County	59874	
Troy	1	Lincoln County	59935	
Turner	1	Blaine County	59542	
Twin Bridges	1	Madison County	59754	
Two Dot	1	Wheatland County	59085	

== U ==
Name of place	Number of counties	Principal county	ZIP code	
Name of place	Number of counties	Principal county	Lower	Upper
Ulm	1	Cascade County	59485	

== V ==
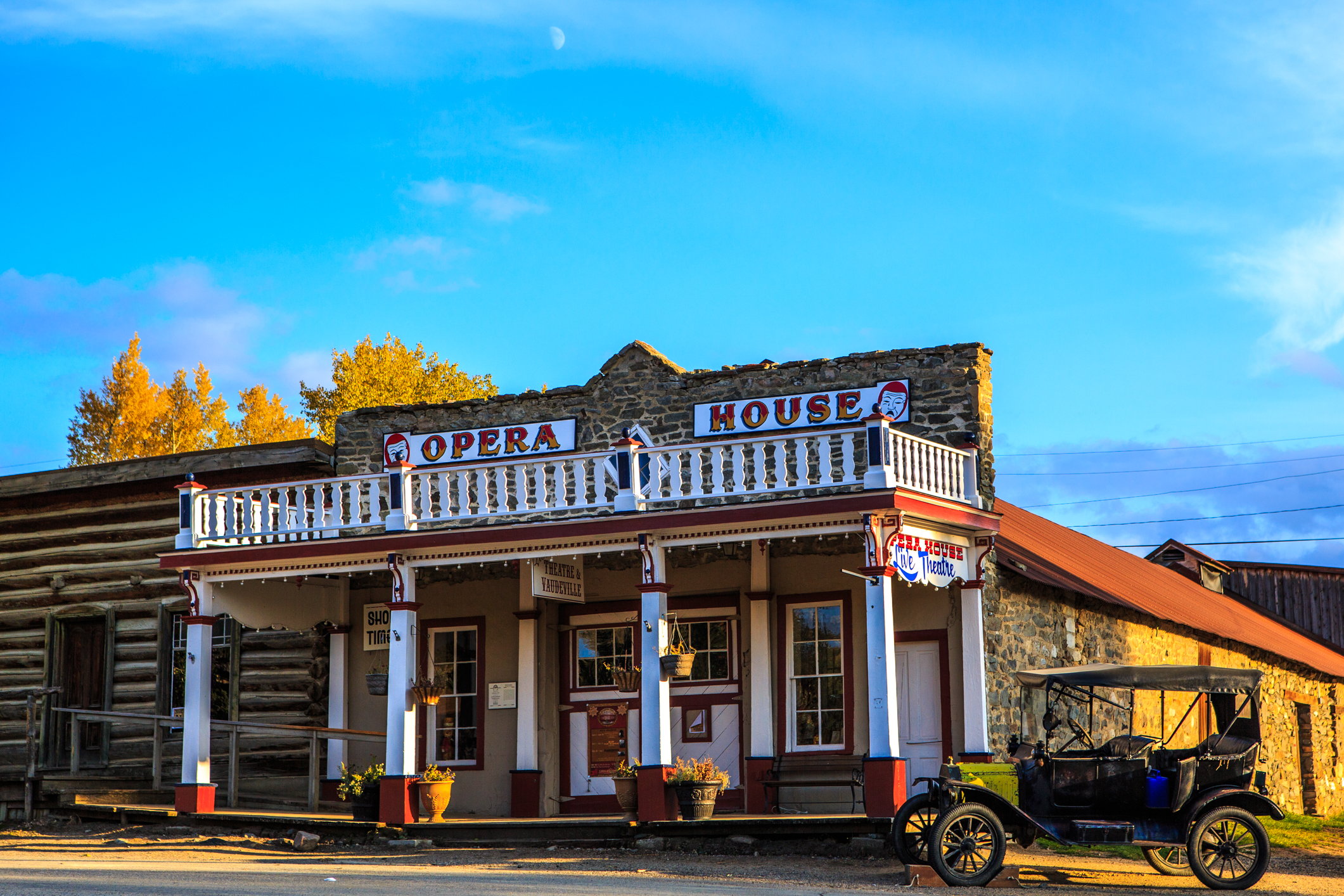
Opera House in Virginia City

Name of place	Number of counties	Principal county	ZIP code	
Name of place	Number of counties	Principal county	Lower	Upper
Valier	1	Pondera County	59486	
Vandalia	1	Valley County	59273	
Vaughn	1	Cascade County	59487	
Victor	1	Ravalli County	59875	
Vida	1	McCone County	59274	
Virginia City	1	Madison County	59755	
Volborg	1	Custer County	59351	

== W ==
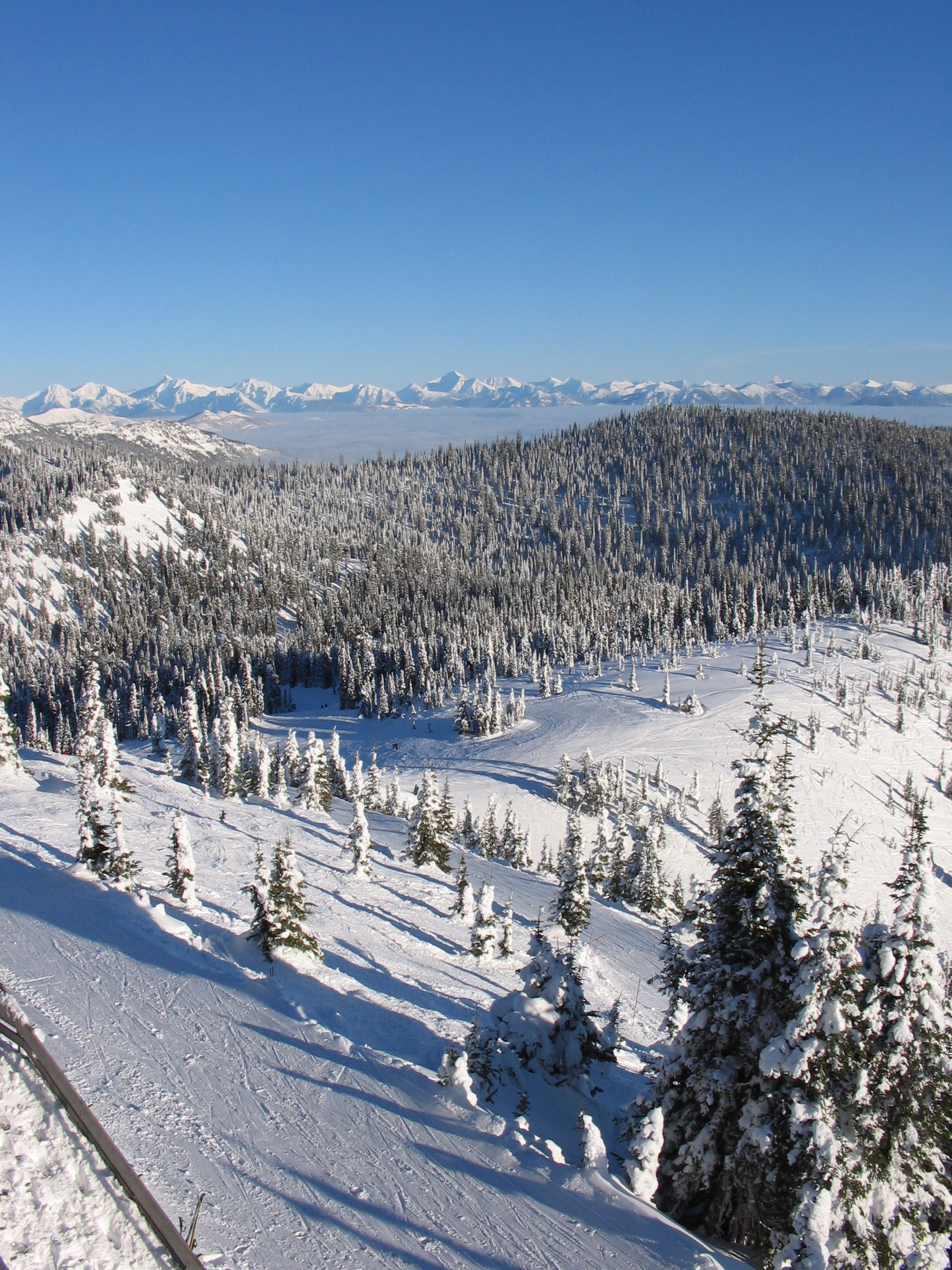
Big Mountain near Whitefish

Name of place	Number of counties	Principal county	ZIP code	
Name of place	Number of counties	Principal county	Lower	Upper
Warm Springs	1	Deer Lodge County	59756	
West Glacier	1	Flathead County	59936	
West Yellowstone	1	Gallatin County	59758	
Westby	1	Sheridan County	59275	
White Sulphur Springs	1	Meagher County	59645	
Whitefish	1	Flathead County	59937	
Whitehall	1	Jefferson County	59759	
Whitetail	1	Daniels County	59276	
Whitewater	1	Phillips County	59544	
Whitlash	1	Liberty County	59545	
Wibaux	1	Wibaux County	59353	
Willard	1	Fallon County	59354	
Willow Creek	1	Gallatin County	59760	
Wilsall	1	Park County	59086	
Winifred	1	Fergus County	59489	
Winnett	1	Petroleum County	59087	
Winston	1	Broadwater County	59647	
Wisdom	1	Beaverhead County	59761	
Wise River	1	Beaverhead County	59762	
Wolf Creek	1	Lewis and Clark	59648	
Wolf Point	1	Roosevelt County	59201	
Worden	1	Yellowstone County	59088	
Wyola	1	Big Horn County	59089	

== Y ==
Name of place	Number of counties	Principal county	ZIP code	
Name of place	Number of counties	Principal county	Lower	Upper
Yaak	1	Lincoln County	59935	
Yellowtail	1	Big Horn County	59035	

== Z ==
Name of place	Number of counties	Principal county	ZIP code	
Name of place	Number of counties	Principal county	Lower	Upper
Zero	1	Prairie County	59349	
Zortman	1	Phillips County	59546	
Zurich	1	Blaine County	59547	

== See also ==
- List of cities and towns in Montana
- List of counties in Montana
- List of ghost towns in Montana
