= Montana Highway 16 =

State highway in Montana, United States

Montana Highway 16
- MT 16 highlighted in red

Route information
- Maintained by MDT
- Length: 152.371 mi (245.217 km)

Major junctions
- South end: I-94 BL (Towne Street) in West Glendive
- I-94 in West Glendive; MT 200 in Sidney; US 2 in Culbertson
- North end: Highway 6 at the Canadian border near Raymond

Location
- Country: United States
- State: Montana
- Counties: Dawson, Richland, Roosevelt, Sheridan

Highway system
- Montana Highway System; Interstate; US; State; Secondary
← MT 13	→ MT 17

Montana Highway 16 (MT 16) is a 152.371-mile-long (245.217 km) state highway in the U.S. state of Montana. It begins in West Glendive at a Business Loop of Interstate 94 (I-94), and ends at the Port of Raymond on the Saskatchewan border. The northern portion from U.S. Route 2 (US 2) at Culbertson to the Canada–United States border is proposed as part of the Theodore Roosevelt Expressway.

== Route description ==
Highway 16 near Reserve

MT 16 begins in West Glendive, across the Yellowstone River from Glendive, at an intersection with a business loop of Interstate 94. It proceeds north, crossing under I-94 before turning northeast to follow the left bank of the Yellowstone River and the Yellowstone Valley Railroad. After crossing from Dawson into Richland counties and passing through Knife River and Crane, the road meets MT 23 and MT 200 south of Sidney. With MT 200, the road continues into Sidney, then MT 16 leaves westwards on the northern outskirts of town and swings northwest, heading away from the North Dakota state line.

Leaving the Yellowstone Valley, MT 16 heads cross-country towards Culbertson, crossing the Missouri River a few miles south of town and entering Roosevelt County there. In Culbertson itself, the road meets US 2, then leaves north, passing Froid's western outskirts and then crossing into Sheridan County. Soon, it passes through the Medicine Lake National Wildlife Refuge, nearby Medicine Lake, and then swings around in an arc to a junction with MT 5, just southeast of Plentywood. The two highways have a concurrency through town, before MT 16 leaves northwards. It then has a clear run to the Canada–US border, continuing on as Saskatchewan Highway 6, connecting to Regina and beyond to Saskatoon.

== Major intersections ==
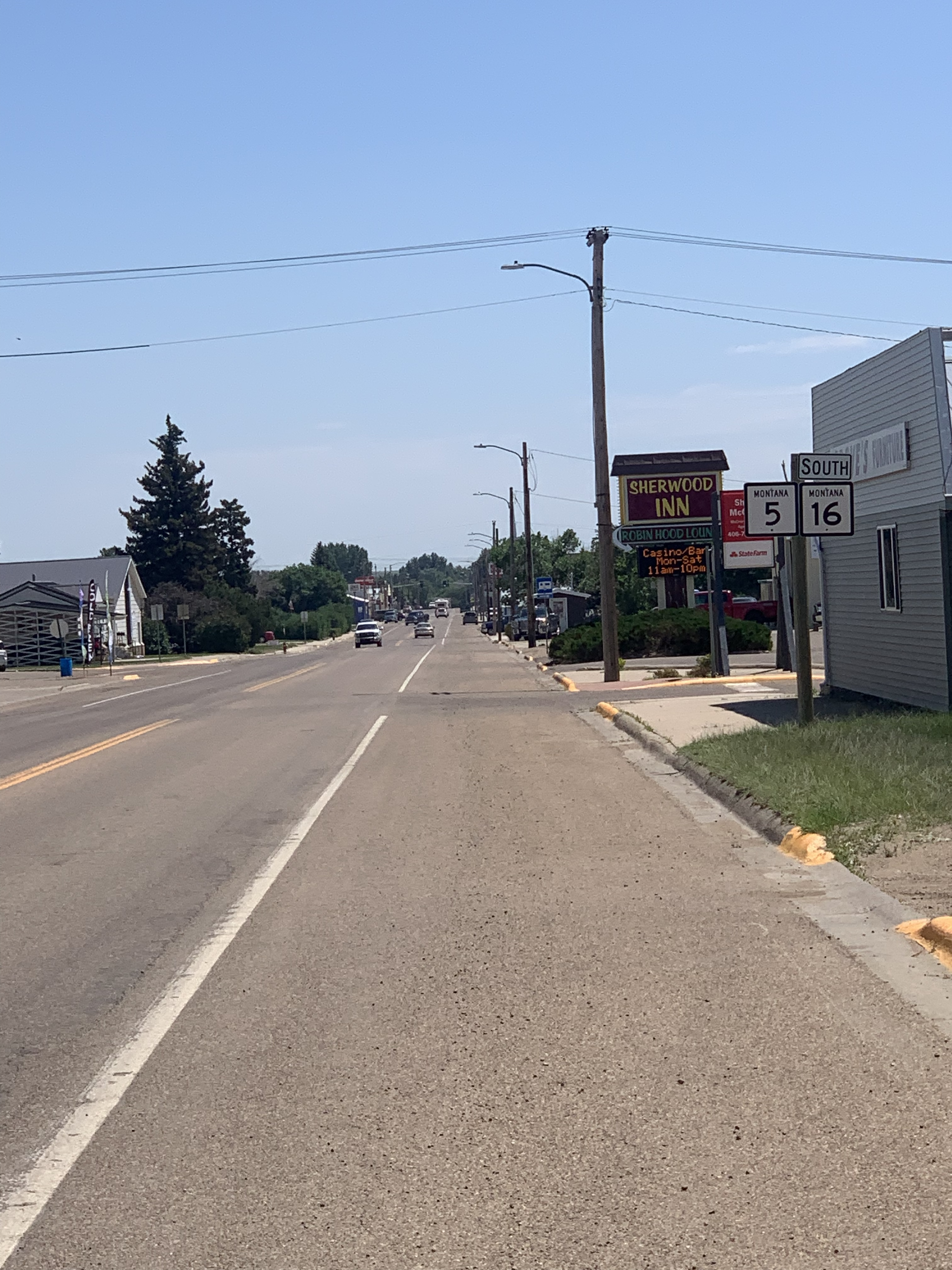
Montana Highway 16 at its concurrency with Montana Highway 5 in Plentywood, Montana

County	Location	mi	km	Destinations	Notes
Dawson	West Glendive	0.000	0.000	I-94 BL – Glendive City Center, Circle	Southern terminus
Dawson	West Glendive	0.596	0.959	I-94 – Billings, Bismarck, Airport	I-94 exit 213
Dawson		3.719	5.985	S-254 north – Bloomfield, Richey	
Richland	Sidney	49.614	79.846	MT 23 east / MT 200 west – Circle	Southern end of MT 200 overlap
Richland	Sidney	52.182	83.979	MT 200 east – Fairview	Northern end of MT 200 overlap
Richland		65.292	105.077	S-201 – Fairview	
Roosevelt	Culbertson	89.464	143.978	US 2 west – Wolf Point	Western end of US 2 overlap
Roosevelt	Culbertson	90.144	145.073	US 2 east – Williston	Eastern end of US 2 overlap
Roosevelt		97.412	156.769	McCabe	Former S-496 east
Roosevelt	Froid	103.063	165.864	S-405 east – Froid	
Roosevelt	Froid	103.433	166.459	S-344 west	
Sheridan		108.943	175.327	S-350 west – Homestead	
Sheridan	Medicine Lake	114.571	184.384	S-573 east	
Sheridan		122.897	197.784	CR 258 – Reserve, Dagmar	Former S-258
Sheridan		130.152	209.459	S-517 east – Coalridge	
Sheridan		135.605	218.235	MT 5 east – Westby	southern end of MT 5 overlap
Sheridan	Plentywood	137.632	221.497	MT 5 west – Scobey	northern end of MT 5 overlap
Raymond–Regway Border Crossing		152.371	245.217	Canada–United States border	
Raymond–Regway Border Crossing		152.371	245.217	Highway 6 north – Regina	Continuation into Saskatchewan
1.000 mi = 1.609 km; 1.000 km = 0.621 mi: Concurrency terminus
