= Theodore Roosevelt Expressway =

Highway in Montana

- High Priority Corridor 58
- Theodore Roosevelt Expressway highlighted in red

Route information
- Length: 443 mi (713 km)
- Existed: 2005–present
- Component highways: I-90 from Rapid City, SD to Spearfish, SD; US 85 from Spearfish, SD to Williston, ND; US 2 from Williston, ND to Culbertson, MT; MT 16 from Culbertson, MT to Canada-US border

Major junctions
- South end: I-90 / US 14 / US 16 Truck in Rapid City, SD
- US 14A at Sturgis, SD; I-90 / US 14 / US 85 at Spearfish, SD; US 212 at Belle Fourche, SD; US 12 at Bowman, ND; I-94 at Belfield, ND; US 2 / US 85 at Williston, ND; US 2 at Culbertson, MT
- North end: Highway 6 at Raymond, MT

Location
- Country: United States
- States: South Dakota; North Dakota; Montana

Highway system
- High-Priority Corridors

The Theodore Roosevelt Expressway (also known as National Highway System High Priority Corridor 58), is made up of several existing highways between Rapid City, South Dakota and the Port of Raymond between Saskatchewan and Montana. It is the northern third of the Ports-to-Plains Alliance. The corridor is approximately 443 miles (713 km) long with the majority of the highway two lanes. Congress designated the route as one of 80 National Highway System High-Priority Corridors in 2005 by the Intermodal Surface Transportation Efficiency Act. The designation did not create new design standards or create new eligibility for any additional federal funding.

The route begins in Rapid City, South Dakota and runs north on U.S. Route 85 to Williston, North Dakota. From Williston, the route turns west on U.S. Route 2 to Culbertson, Montana where it turns north on Montana Highway 16 to the Canada–US border at Raymond, Montana. The expressway takes its name from former President of the United States Theodore Roosevelt.

== South Dakota ==
Through South Dakota, the route runs 161 miles (259 km) from Rapid City to the North Dakota state line. The route runs concurrent with Interstate 90/U.S. Route 14 from Rapid City at an interchange with U.S. Route 16 Truck/South Dakota Highway 79 west through Sturgis en route to Spearfish where it turns north onto U.S. 85. The route then continues in a northerly direction through Belle Fourche, Redig, Buffalo and Ludlow en route to the North Dakota state line.

== North Dakota ==
Through North Dakota, the route runs 197 miles (317 km) from the South Dakota state line to the Montana state line. After crossing the state line, the highway continues north along U.S. 85 through Bowman, Amidon, Belfield (where it intersects Interstate 94), Fairfield, Grassy Butte, Watford City, Arnegard, Rawson, and Alexander before its junction with U.S. 2 just west of Williston. The route then parallels U.S. 2 to the Montana state line.

== Montana ==
Through Montana, the route runs 85 miles (137 km) from the North Dakota state line to the Canada–US border. After crossing the state line, the route continues west along U.S. 2 through Bainville en route to Culbertson. In Culbertson the route turns north along Montana Highway 16 through Froid, Medicine Lake, Antelope, Plentywood and Raymond before ending at the Port of Raymond.

== Future ==
The extension of Interstate 27 north from Texas call for the route to follow along the expressway.
