= Crane, Montana =

- Census-designated place
- Location within Montana
- Coordinates: 47°34′43″N 104°14′45″W
- Country: United States
- State: Montana
- County: Richland

Area
  - Total: 2.53 sq mi (6.55 km^{2})
  - Land: 2.52 sq mi (6.53 km^{2})
  - Water: 0.0077 sq mi (0.02 km^{2})
- Elevation: 1,936 ft (590 m)

Population (2020)
  - Total: 91
  - Density: 36.1/sq mi (13.94/km^{2})
- Time zone: UTC-7 (Mountain (MST))
  - Summer (DST): UTC-6 (MDT)
- ZIP code: 59217
- Area code: 406
- GNIS feature ID: 2583803

Crane is a census-designated place and unincorporated community in Richland County, Montana, United States. As of the 2020 census, Crane had a population of 91. Crane has a post office with the ZIP code 59217. Montana Highway 16 passes through Crane.

The town was named for trapper Jimmy Crain when the post office opened in 1910.

== Climate ==
According to the Köppen Climate Classification system, Crane has a semi-arid climate, which is abbreviated as "BSk" on climate maps.

== Demographics ==
Historical population
Census	Pop.	Note	%±
2020	91		—
U.S. Decennial Census
