= West Glendive, Montana =

- Census-designated place
- Location of West Glendive, Montana
- Coordinates: 47°6′39″N 104°44′53″W
- Country: United States
- State: Montana
- County: Dawson

Area
  - Total: 3.85 sq mi (9.98 km^{2})
  - Land: 3.84 sq mi (9.95 km^{2})
  - Water: 0.012 sq mi (0.03 km^{2})
- Elevation: 2,119 ft (646 m)

Population (2020)
  - Total: 1,998
  - Density: 519.9/sq mi (200.73/km^{2})
- Time zone: UTC-7 (Mountain (MST))
  - Summer (DST): UTC-6 (MDT)
- Area code: 406
- FIPS code: 30-79086
- GNIS feature ID: 1853191

West Glendive is a census-designated place (CDP) in Dawson County, Montana, United States. The population was 1,998 at the 2020 census.

== Geography ==
West Glendive is located in south-central Dawson County at 47°06′39″N 104°44′53″W (47.110710, -104.748022), on the west side of the Yellowstone River, across from the city of Glendive. (A portion of Glendive extends west across the river to touch the West Glendive CDP.) Interstate 94 passes through the CDP, with access from Exits 210, 211, and 213. I-94 leads southwest 75 miles (121 km) to Miles City and east past Glendive 99 miles (159 km) to Dickinson, North Dakota. Montana Highway 16 leads northeast from West Glendive 52 miles (84 km) along the Yellowstone River to Sidney. The Zip Code is 59330.

According to the U.S. Census Bureau, the West Glendive CDP has a total area of 3.9 square miles (10.1 km^{2}), of which 0.01 square miles (0.03 km^{2}), or 0.30%, is water.

== Demographics ==
Historical population
Census	Pop.	Note	%±
2000	1,833		—
2010	1,948		6.3%
2020	1,998		2.6%
U.S. Decennial Census

=== 2020 census ===
As of the 2020 census, West Glendive had a population of 1,998. The median age was 43.4 years. 23.5% of residents were under the age of 18 and 20.1% of residents were 65 years of age or older. For every 100 females there were 107.9 males, and for every 100 females age 18 and over there were 105.2 males age 18 and over.

87.2% of residents lived in urban areas, while 12.8% lived in rural areas.

There were 843 households in West Glendive, of which 27.6% had children under the age of 18 living in them. Of all households, 56.2% were married-couple households, 21.4% were households with a male householder and no spouse or partner present, and 16.8% were households with a female householder and no spouse or partner present. About 29.1% of all households were made up of individuals and 10.7% had someone living alone who was 65 years of age or older.

There were 982 housing units, of which 14.2% were vacant. The homeowner vacancy rate was 1.4% and the rental vacancy rate was 18.1%.

Racial composition as of the 2020 census
Race	Number	Percent
White	1,816	90.9%
Black or African American	5	0.3%
American Indian and Alaska Native	24	1.2%
Asian	10	0.5%
Native Hawaiian and Other Pacific Islander	0	0.0%
Some other race	15	0.8%
Two or more races	128	6.4%
Hispanic or Latino (of any race)	61	3.1%

=== 2000 census ===
As of the 2000 census, there were 1,833 people, 725 households, and 548 families residing in the CDP. The population density was 530.4 inhabitants per square mile (204.8/km^{2}). There were 768 housing units at an average density of 222.2 units per square mile (85.8 units/km^{2}). The racial makeup of the CDP was 97.93% White, 0.27% African American, 0.33% Native American, 0.33% Asian, 0.05% Pacific Islander, 0.38% from other races, and 0.71% from two or more races. Hispanic or Latino of any race were 0.87% of the population.

There were 725 households, out of which 32.6% had children under the age of 18 living with them, 66.9% were married couples living together, 6.3% had a female householder with no husband present, and 24.3% were non-families. 21.7% of all households were made up of individuals, and 8.8% had someone living alone who was 65 years of age or older. The average household size was 2.52 and the average family size was 2.91.

In the CDP, the population was spread out, with 25.7% under the age of 18, 5.6% from 18 to 24, 27.0% from 25 to 44, 27.1% from 45 to 64, and 14.6% who were 65 years of age or older. The median age was 40 years. For every 100 females, there were 93.8 males. For every 100 females age 18 and over, there were 96.5 males.

The median income for a household in the CDP was $33,487, and the median income for a family was $40,242. Males had a median income of $31,582 versus $18,448 for females. The per capita income for the CDP was $16,100. About 11.2% of families and 14.3% of the population were below the poverty line, including 15.6% of those under age 18 and 18.4% of those age 65 or over.

== See also ==
- List of census-designated places in Montana
