= Homestead, Montana =

- Unincorporated community
- Location within Montana Location within the United States
- Coordinates: 48°25′13″N 104°32′13″W
- Country: United States
- State: Montana
- County: Sheridan

Area
  - Total: 0.44 sq mi (1.13 km^{2})
  - Land: 0.44 sq mi (1.13 km^{2})
  - Water: 0 sq mi (0.00 km^{2})
- Elevation: 1,982 ft (604 m)

Population (2020)
  - Total: 35
  - Density: 80.5/sq mi (31.07/km^{2})
- Time zone: UTC-7 (Mountain (MST))
  - Summer (DST): UTC-6 (MDT)
- ZIP code: 59242
- Area code: 406
- GNIS feature ID: 2806664

Homestead is an unincorporated community in Sheridan County, Montana, United States. As of the 2020 census, Homestead had a population of 35. Homestead is located along a railroad, 5.8 miles (9.3 km) south-southwest of Medicine Lake. The community had a post office until November 19, 1994; it still has its own ZIP code, 59242.

Originally named Barford, the town name was changed to Pederson in 1908 after the postmaster. After confusion with the mail, the citizens chose the name Fort Peck for the new community. The town of Poplar objected to this name, since it was the headquarters of the Fort Peck Indian Agency. The residents then chose the name Homestead.

== Demographics ==
Historical population
Census	Pop.	Note	%±
2020	35		—
U.S. Decennial Census

== Education ==
The school district is Medicine Lake K-12 Schools.
