= Redstone, Montana =

- Unincorporated community
- Location within Montana Location within the United States
- Coordinates: 48°49′18″N 104°56′36″W
- Country: United States
- State: Montana
- County: Sheridan

Area
  - Total: 0.34 sq mi (0.87 km^{2})
  - Land: 0.34 sq mi (0.87 km^{2})
  - Water: 0 sq mi (0.00 km^{2})
- Elevation: 2,103 ft (641 m)

Population (2020)
  - Total: 13
  - Density: 38.7/sq mi (14.93/km^{2})
- Time zone: UTC-7 (Mountain (MST))
  - Summer (DST): UTC-6 (MDT)
- ZIP code: 59257
- Area code: 406
- GNIS feature ID: 2806665

Redstone is an unincorporated community in Sheridan County, Montana, United States. As of the 2020 census, Redstone had a population of 13. Redstone is located on Montana Highway 5, 18 miles (29 km) west of Plentywood. The community had a post office from 1903 until March 9, 2013; it still has its own ZIP code, 59257.

It is near the confluence of the Muddy River and Eagle Creek.

== Climate ==
Climate data for Redstone, Montana, 1991–2020 normals, 1951-2020 extremes: 2106ft (642m)
| Month | Jan | Feb | Mar | Apr | May | Jun | Jul | Aug | Sep | Oct | Nov | Dec | Year |
|---|---|---|---|---|---|---|---|---|---|---|---|---|---|
| Record high °F (°C) | 62 (17) | 68 (20) | 79 (26) | 92 (33) | 102 (39) | 105 (41) | 110 (43) | 110 (43) | 104 (40) | 96 (36) | 80 (27) | 60 (16) | 110 (43) |
| Mean maximum °F (°C) | 47.9 (8.8) | 49.6 (9.8) | 64.7 (18.2) | 79.1 (26.2) | 88.2 (31.2) | 93.5 (34.2) | 97.9 (36.6) | 98.3 (36.8) | 91.4 (33.0) | 79.9 (26.6) | 61.1 (16.2) | 47.3 (8.5) | 100.5 (38.1) |
| Mean daily maximum °F (°C) | 23.7 (−4.6) | 26.3 (−3.2) | 39.1 (3.9) | 55.6 (13.1) | 67.0 (19.4) | 75.1 (23.9) | 82.4 (28.0) | 82.3 (27.9) | 71.8 (22.1) | 54.9 (12.7) | 37.8 (3.2) | 25.6 (−3.6) | 53.5 (11.9) |
| Daily mean °F (°C) | 11.2 (−11.6) | 15.1 (−9.4) | 27.1 (−2.7) | 40.7 (4.8) | 52.0 (11.1) | 60.9 (16.1) | 66.7 (19.3) | 65.5 (18.6) | 55.1 (12.8) | 41.2 (5.1) | 26.0 (−3.3) | 14.4 (−9.8) | 39.7 (4.3) |
| Mean daily minimum °F (°C) | −1.3 (−18.5) | 3.8 (−15.7) | 15.2 (−9.3) | 25.9 (−3.4) | 36.9 (2.7) | 46.8 (8.2) | 51.0 (10.6) | 48.7 (9.3) | 38.4 (3.6) | 27.4 (−2.6) | 14.2 (−9.9) | 3.2 (−16.0) | 25.8 (−3.4) |
| Mean minimum °F (°C) | −30.2 (−34.6) | −22.8 (−30.4) | −10.1 (−23.4) | 9.7 (−12.4) | 21.3 (−5.9) | 33.3 (0.7) | 38.5 (3.6) | 34.3 (1.3) | 20.3 (−6.5) | 6.9 (−13.9) | −9.2 (−22.9) | −25.4 (−31.9) | −35.6 (−37.6) |
| Record low °F (°C) | −53 (−47) | −48 (−44) | −35 (−37) | −27 (−33) | 5 (−15) | 23 (−5) | 29 (−2) | 16 (−9) | 9 (−13) | −12 (−24) | −32 (−36) | −52 (−47) | −53 (−47) |
| Average precipitation inches (mm) | 0.42 (11) | 0.24 (6.1) | 0.67 (17) | 0.86 (22) | 2.22 (56) | 3.08 (78) | 2.14 (54) | 1.80 (46) | 0.97 (25) | 0.88 (22) | 0.43 (11) | 0.57 (14) | 14.28 (362.1) |
| Average snowfall inches (cm) | 4.6 (12) | 2.7 (6.9) | 2.1 (5.3) | 0.8 (2.0) | 0.3 (0.76) | 0.0 (0.0) | 0.0 (0.0) | 0.0 (0.0) | 0.0 (0.0) | 0.7 (1.8) | 3.6 (9.1) | 3.1 (7.9) | 17.9 (45.76) |
Source 1: NOAA (1981-2010 snowfall)
Source 2: XMACIS (temp records & monthly max/mins)

== Demographics ==
Historical population
| Census | Pop. | Note | %± |
|---|---|---|---|
| 2020 | 13 | | — |
U.S. Decennial Census

== Education ==
The school district is Plentywood K-12 Schools.
