= Sheridan County, Montana =

County in Montana, United States

- County
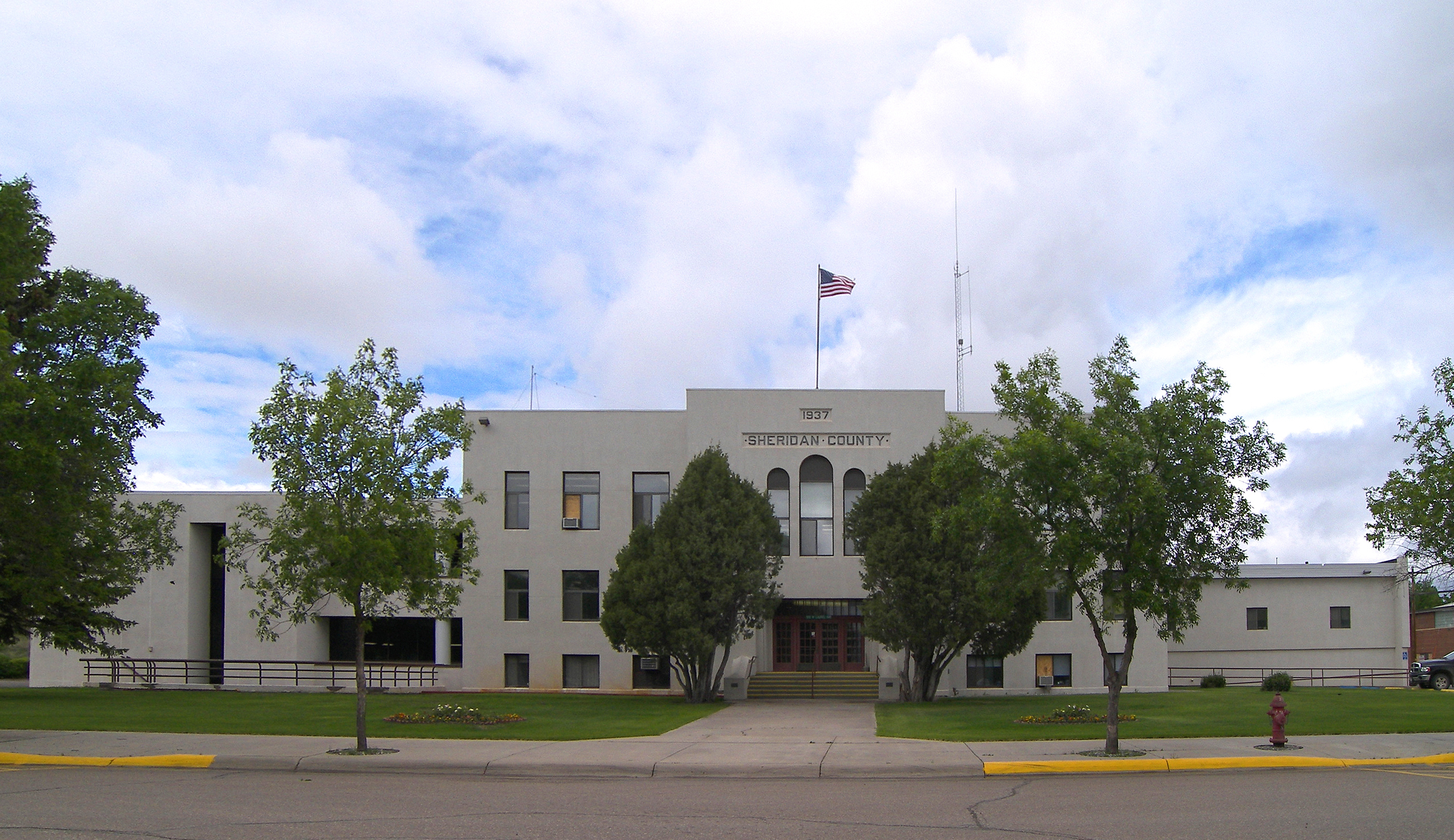
- Sheridan County Courthouse in Plentywood

- Location within the U.S. state of Montana
- Coordinates: 48°44′N 104°30′W
- Country: United States
- State: Montana
- Founded: March 11, 1913
- Named for: Philip Sheridan
- Seat: Plentywood
- Largest city: Plentywood

Area
  - Total: 1,706 sq mi (4,420 km^{2})
  - Land: 1,677 sq mi (4,340 km^{2})
  - Water: 29 sq mi (75 km^{2}) 1.7%

Population (2020)
  - Total: 3,539
  - Estimate (2025): 3,436 ▼
  - Density: 2.110/sq mi (0.8148/km^{2})
- Time zone: UTC−7 (Mountain)
  - Summer (DST): UTC−6 (MDT)
- Congressional district: 2nd
- Website: www.sheridancountymt.gov
- Montana county number 34

The Harshenberger family of Mennonites in Sheridan County, a 1943 photograph by Russell Lee

Sheridan County is a county in the U.S. state of Montana. As of the 2020 census, the population was 3,539. Its county seat is Plentywood. Its northern boundary is the Canada–United States border south of Saskatchewan.

== History ==
The Montana Legislature established Sheridan County in 1913 from portions of Dawson and Valley Counties. It was named for American Civil War General Philip Sheridan. In the 1920s and 1930s the county was a hotbed of communist organizing. The CPUSA managed to elect several town and county officials. At the 1932 presidential election the communist candidate William Z. Foster got 576 votes (22%). International changes in communist organizing strategies, especially the move towards the popular front, effectively ended communist presence in the area.

== Geography ==
According to the United States Census Bureau, the county has a total area of 1,706 square miles (4,420 km^{2}), of which 1,677 square miles (4,340 km^{2}) is land and 29 square miles (75 km^{2}) (1.7%) is water.

=== Major highways ===
- Montana Highway 5
- Montana Highway 16

=== Adjacent counties and rural municipalities ===
- Rural Municipality of Happy Valley, Saskatchewan – northwest
- Rural Municipality of Surprise Valley, Saskatchewan – north
- Rural Municipality of Lake Alma, Saskatchewan – northeast
- Daniels County – west
- Divide County, North Dakota – east
- Williams County, North Dakota – east
- Roosevelt County – south

=== National protected area ===
- Medicine Lake National Wildlife Refuge (part)

== Demographics ==
Historical population
Census	Pop.	Note	%±
1920	13,847		—
1930	9,869		−28.7%
1940	7,814		−20.8%
1950	6,674		−14.6%
1960	6,458		−3.2%
1970	5,779		−10.5%
1980	5,414		−6.3%
1990	4,732		−12.6%
2000	4,105		−13.3%
2010	3,384		−17.6%
2020	3,539		4.6%
2025 (est.)	3,436	▼	−2.9%
U.S. Decennial Census; 1790–1960, 1900–1990, 1990–2000, 2010–2020

=== 2020 census ===
As of the 2020 census, the county had a population of 3,539. Of the residents, 21.3% were under the age of 18 and 24.6% were 65 years of age or older; the median age was 46.0 years. For every 100 females there were 108.5 males, and for every 100 females age 18 and over there were 106.4 males. 0.0% of residents lived in urban areas and 100.0% lived in rural areas.

The racial makeup of the county was 90.4% White, 0.4% Black or African American, 1.8% American Indian and Alaska Native, 0.4% Asian, 0.7% from some other race, and 6.3% from two or more races. Hispanic or Latino residents of any race comprised 3.0% of the population.

There were 1,631 households in the county, of which 24.2% had children under the age of 18 living with them and 23.2% had a female householder with no spouse or partner present. About 38.2% of all households were made up of individuals and 17.5% had someone living alone who was 65 years of age or older.

There were 2,128 housing units, of which 23.4% were vacant. Among occupied housing units, 72.5% were owner-occupied and 27.5% were renter-occupied. The homeowner vacancy rate was 3.2% and the rental vacancy rate was 14.4%.

=== 2010 census ===
As of the 2010 census, there were 3,384 people, 1,587 households, and 944 families living in the county. The population density was 2.0 inhabitants per square mile (0.77/km^{2}). There were 2,089 housing units at an average density of 1.2 units per square mile (0.46 units/km^{2}). The racial makeup of the county was 95.4% white, 1.7% American Indian, 0.4% Asian, 0.2% black or African American, 0.3% from other races, and 2.0% from two or more races. Those of Hispanic or Latino origin made up 1.5% of the population. In terms of ancestry, 33.8% were Norwegian, 26.0% were German, 12.0% were Danish, 11.6% were Irish, 5.5% were Swedish, 5.3% were English, and 5.0% were American.

Of the 1,587 households, 21.3% had children under the age of 18 living with them, 49.5% were married couples living together, 5.7% had a female householder with no husband present, 40.5% were non-families, and 37.1% of all households were made up of individuals. The average household size was 2.08 and the average family size was 2.70. The median age was 50.3 years.

The median income for a household in the county was $39,578 and the median income for a family was $55,313. Males had a median income of $46,932 versus $22,107 for females. The per capita income for the county was $26,537. About 6.4% of families and 14.5% of the population were below the poverty line, including 8.8% of those under age 18 and 10.4% of those age 65 or over.

== Politics ==
Sheridan County voters have selected the Republican County candidate in 80% of the national elections since 1980.

Sheridan County had a strong Communist Party presence in the first half of the 20th century. In the 1932 presidential election, Communist candidate William Z. Foster received 18% of the vote in the county, his strongest performance nationwide.

United States presidential election results for Sheridan County, Montana
Year	Republican		Democratic		Third party(ies)	
Year	No.	%	No.	%	No.	%
1916	1,724	32.15%	3,264	60.86%	375	6.99%
1920	1,335	53.46%	610	24.43%	552	22.11%
1924	905	35.32%	176	6.87%	1,481	57.81%
1928	1,624	54.66%	1,190	40.05%	157	5.28%
1932	739	22.77%	1,450	44.67%	1,057	32.56%
1936	513	16.19%	2,503	79.01%	152	4.80%
1940	892	29.23%	2,108	69.07%	52	1.70%
1944	791	31.04%	1,713	67.23%	44	1.73%
1948	699	28.50%	1,515	61.76%	239	9.74%
1952	1,339	49.39%	1,347	49.69%	25	0.92%
1956	1,153	38.31%	1,857	61.69%	0	0.00%
1960	1,196	43.43%	1,549	56.25%	9	0.33%
1964	837	30.39%	1,905	69.17%	12	0.44%
1968	1,180	45.81%	1,275	49.50%	121	4.70%
1972	1,500	53.96%	1,197	43.06%	83	2.99%
1976	1,114	41.05%	1,560	57.48%	40	1.47%
1980	1,658	56.94%	955	32.80%	299	10.27%
1984	1,774	61.62%	1,087	37.76%	18	0.63%
1988	1,381	49.98%	1,354	49.00%	28	1.01%
1992	795	29.85%	1,077	40.44%	791	29.70%
1996	832	34.17%	1,187	48.75%	416	17.08%
2000	1,176	59.85%	702	35.73%	87	4.43%
2004	1,159	56.87%	846	41.51%	33	1.62%
2008	987	49.20%	953	47.51%	66	3.29%
2012	1,207	62.60%	665	34.49%	56	2.90%
2016	1,241	67.63%	477	25.99%	117	6.38%
2020	1,403	69.11%	574	28.28%	53	2.61%
2024	1,321	69.09%	509	26.62%	82	4.29%

== Communities ==
=== City ===
- Plentywood (county seat)

=== Towns ===
- Medicine Lake
- Outlook
- Westby

=== Census-designated place ===
- Antelope
- Homestead
- Redstone
- Reserve

=== Unincorporated communities ===
- Coalridge
- Comertown
- Dagmar
- Raymond
- Reserve
- Caldera

=== Former towns ===
- Dooley
- Archer

== Census-designated places ==
- Antelope
- Homestead
- Redstone
- Reserve

== Education ==
School districts include:

- Medicine Lake K-12 Schools
- Plentywood K-12 Schools
- Westby K-12 Schools

== See also ==
- List of lakes in Sheridan County, Montana
- List of mountains in Sheridan County, Montana
- National Register of Historic Places listings in Sheridan County, Montana
