= Antelope, Montana =

- CDP
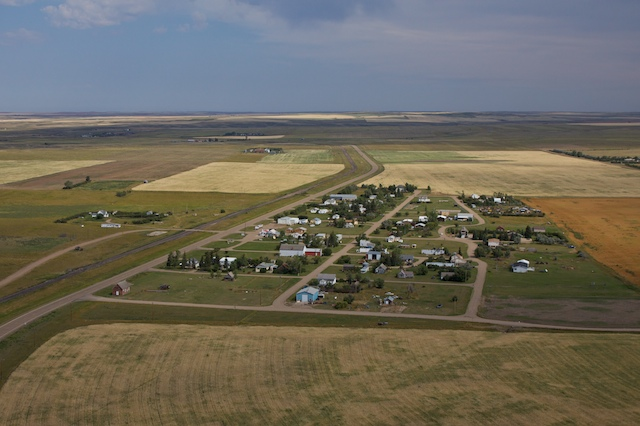
- Aerial view of the community

- Location of Antelope, Montana
- Coordinates: 48°41′23″N 104°27′14″W
- Country: United States
- State: Montana
- County: Sheridan

Area
  - Total: 0.20 sq mi (0.52 km^{2})
  - Land: 0.20 sq mi (0.52 km^{2})
  - Water: 0 sq mi (0.00 km^{2})
- Elevation: 2,038 ft (621 m)

Population (2020)
  - Total: 74
  - Density: 366.1/sq mi (141.37/km^{2})
- Time zone: UTC-7 (Mountain (MST))
  - Summer (DST): UTC-6 (MDT)
- ZIP code: 59211
- Area code: 406
- FIPS code: 30-02050
- GNIS feature ID: 2407745

Antelope is a census-designated place (CDP) in Sheridan County, Montana, United States. As of the 2020 census, Antelope had a population of 74.

== History ==
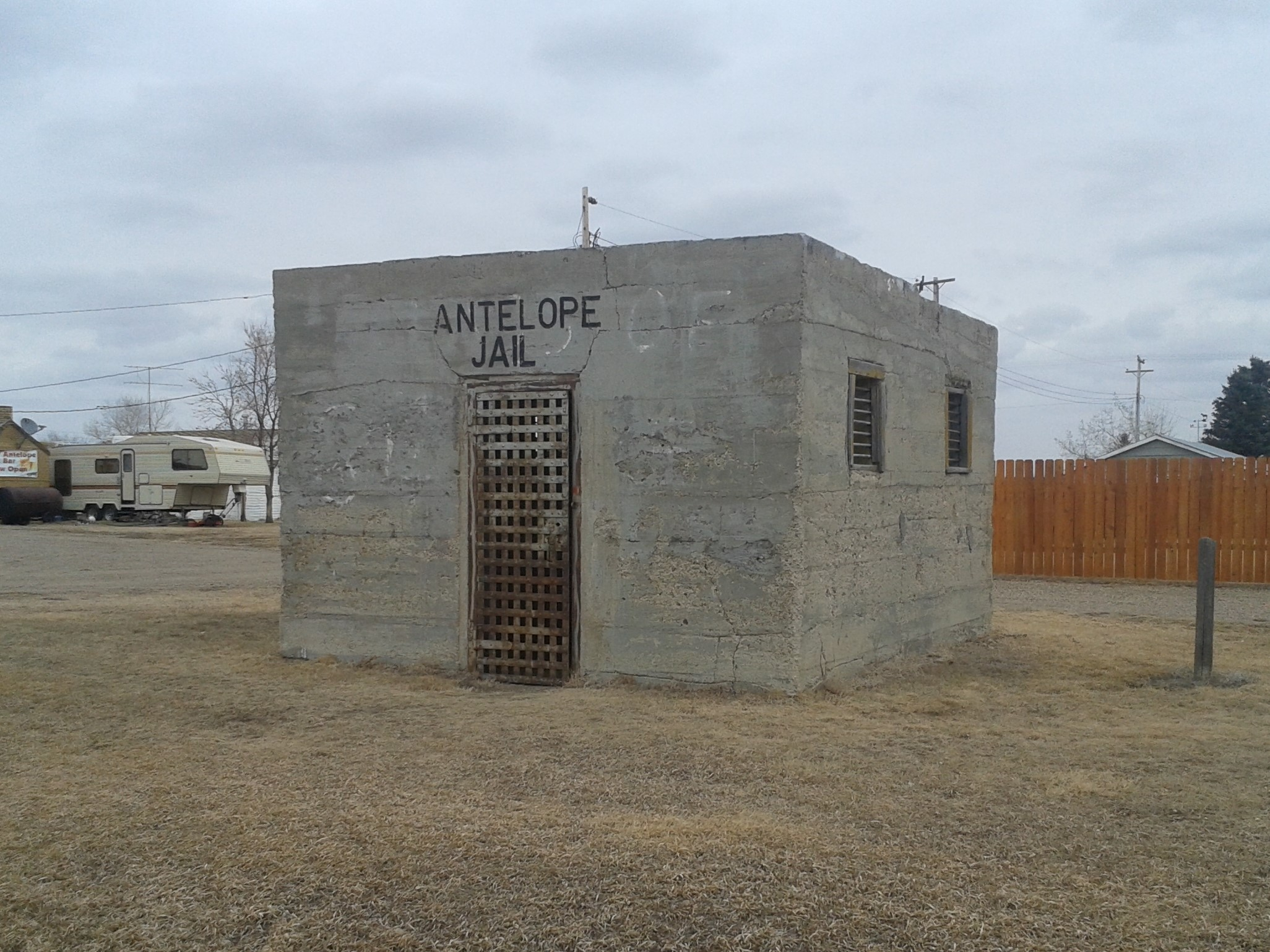
Old Antelope Jail c. 2014

Named for the nearby creek, Antelope began as a tiny community along the Great Northern Railway's Bainville to Scobey branch line in 1910. That year, John and Richard Grayson built a hardware store next to the Antelope Creek Lutheran Church. A post office, bank, lumberyard, and saloon soon followed. The town was incorporated in 1913. The community thrived during its first decade, adding general mercantiles, a butcher shop, a concrete plant, restaurants, and other businesses to serve the region's growing homesteader population. Over the years, however, better roads to the south siphoned off business, and the “Biggest Little City in Eastern Montana” sank into decline.

In 1967 a U.S. Navy gunboat was named the "Antelope". To mark the occasion crew members came to the town of Antelope and some of the town's citizens went to Tacoma, Washington.

=== School ===
Antelope School was built in 1916, the gym was finished in 1945. The school burned on October 20, 1978, students attended Plentywood school for the remainder of the year. The school graduated 522 students from 1922 to 1979 (the 1979 graduating class was graduated at Plentwyood school but consider Antelope school their Alma mater).

=== Centennial Celebration ===
Antelope celebrated 100 years as a community on July 3, 2010. They had a parade, lunch, a skit about the history of town, and a street dance, among time for people to catch up with one another and blow up games for the kids in the park. The bar was also re-opened for the celebration as a gathering place and place to get a drink.

== Geography ==
According to the United States Census Bureau, the CDP has a total area of 0.1 square miles (0.26 km^{2}), all land.

== Demographics ==
Historical population
Census	Pop.	Note	%±
2020	74		—
U.S. Decennial Census

As of the census of 2000, there were 43 people, 21 households, and 11 families residing in the CDP. The population density was 532.7 inhabitants per square mile (205.7/km^{2}). There were 24 housing units at an average density of 297.3 per square mile (114.8/km^{2}). The racial makeup of the CDP was 100.00% White.

There were 21 households, out of which 23.8% had children under the age of 18 living with them, 38.1% were married couples living together, 4.8% had a female householder with no husband present, and 47.6% were non-families. 47.6% of all households were made up of individuals, and 14.3% had someone living alone who was 65 years of age or older. The average household size was 2.05 and the average family size was 3.00.

In the CDP, the population was spread out, with 18.6% under the age of 18, 16.3% from 18 to 24, 14.0% from 25 to 44, 34.9% from 45 to 64, and 16.3% who were 65 years of age or older. The median age was 46 years. For every 100 females there were 168.8 males. For every 100 females age 18 and over, there were 169.2 males.

The median income for a household in the CDP was $16,500, and the median income for a family was $16,500. Males had a median income of $21,250 versus $15,250 for females. The per capita income for the CDP was $5,455. There were 28.6% of families and 22.4% of the population living below the poverty line, including 26.9% of under eighteens and none of those over 64.
