= Dagmar, Montana =

Unincorporated community in Sheridan County, Montana

Coordinates: 48°35′00″N 104°11′54″W

Dagmar is an unincorporated community in northeastern Sheridan County, Montana, United States. The town was established in 1906 by Danish immigrants to the area.

Dagmar currently has a general store and a post office, which has operated since 1907. Dagmar's school closed in 1996.
