= Reserve, Montana =

- CDP
- Location of Reserve, Montana
- Coordinates: 48°36′57″N 104°27′50″W
- Country: United States
- State: Montana
- County: Sheridan

Area
  - Total: 1.35 sq mi (3.49 km^{2})
  - Land: 1.35 sq mi (3.49 km^{2})
  - Water: 0 sq mi (0.00 km^{2})
- Elevation: 2,054 ft (626 m)

Population (2020)
  - Total: 33
  - Density: 24.4/sq mi (9.44/km^{2})
- Time zone: UTC-7 (Mountain (MST))
  - Summer (DST): UTC-6 (MDT)
- ZIP code: 59258
- Area code: 406
- FIPS code: 30-62125
- GNIS feature ID: 2409165

Reserve is a census-designated place (CDP) in Sheridan County, Montana, United States. As of the 2020 census, Reserve had a population of 33.

The town of Wakea was platted in 1911. The name was changed in 1912 with the establishment of the post office. The name comes from the proximity to the Fort Peck Indian Reservation.

== History ==
The area was first settled by homesteaders when the reservation land was made available by the Dawes Act of 1887.

== Geography ==
According to the United States Census Bureau, the CDP has a total area of 1.4 square miles (3.6 km^{2}), all land.

== Demographics ==
Historical population
Census	Pop.	Note	%±
2020	33		—
U.S. Decennial Census

As of the census of 2000, there were 37 people, 18 households, and 10 families residing in the CDP. The population density was 26.9 inhabitants per square mile (10.4/km^{2}). There were 25 housing units at an average density of 18.2 per square mile (7.0/km^{2}). The racial makeup of the CDP was 97.30% White and 2.70% Native American. Hispanic or Latino of any race were 2.70% of the population.

There were 18 households, out of which 27.8% had children under the age of 18 living with them, 61.1% were married couples living together, and 38.9% were non-families. 33.3% of all households were made up of individuals, and 11.1% had someone living alone who was 65 years of age or older. The average household size was 2.06 and the average family size was 2.64.

In the CDP, the population was spread out, with 18.9% under the age of 18, 2.7% from 18 to 24, 13.5% from 25 to 44, 35.1% from 45 to 64, and 29.7% who were 65 years of age or older. The median age was 50 years. For every 100 females, there were 76.2 males. For every 100 females age 18 and over, there were 87.5 males.

The median income for a household in the CDP was $33,750, and the median income for a family was $30,000. Males had a median income of $13,750 versus $30,000 for females. The per capita income for the CDP was $13,742. There were 41.7% of families and 33.3% of the population living below the poverty line, including 40.0% of under eighteens and 66.7% of those over 64.

== Education ==
The school district is Medicine Lake K-12 Schools.
