= Raymond, Montana =

Unincorporated community in Montana, U.S.

Coordinates: 48°52′32″N 104°34′49″W

Raymond is an unincorporated community in Sheridan County, Montana, United States. The community lies north of Plentywood. It is nine miles south of the Canada–US border.

The post office, since closed, opened in 1914. Originally called Riba, for lumber merchant Adolph Riba, the town changed its name in 1915 in honor of homesteader Joe Raymond. It was built along the Minneapolis, St. Paul and Sault Ste. Marie Railroad.

== Climate ==
This climatic region is typified by large seasonal temperature differences, with warm to hot (and often humid) summers and cold (sometimes severely cold) winters. According to the Köppen Climate Classification system, Raymond has a humid continental climate, abbreviated "Dfb" on climate maps.

Climate data for Raymond, Montana, 1991–2020 normals, extremes 1950–2021
Month	Jan	Feb	Mar	Apr	May	Jun	Jul	Aug	Sep	Oct	Nov	Dec	Year
Record high °F (°C)	56 (13)	68 (20)	77 (25)	91 (33)	101 (38)	106 (41)	110 (43)	107 (42)	100 (38)	93 (34)	74 (23)	58 (14)	110 (43)
Mean maximum °F (°C)	43.0 (6.1)	44.8 (7.1)	60.8 (16.0)	75.6 (24.2)	83.9 (28.8)	89.0 (31.7)	93.0 (33.9)	94.1 (34.5)	90.4 (32.4)	77.5 (25.3)	58.5 (14.7)	43.7 (6.5)	96.4 (35.8)
Mean daily maximum °F (°C)	20.7 (−6.3)	25.2 (−3.8)	37.9 (3.3)	54.5 (12.5)	66.5 (19.2)	74.2 (23.4)	81.1 (27.3)	81.4 (27.4)	71.0 (21.7)	54.4 (12.4)	36.3 (2.4)	23.8 (−4.6)	52.2 (11.2)
Daily mean °F (°C)	11.3 (−11.5)	15.2 (−9.3)	27.3 (−2.6)	41.5 (5.3)	53.1 (11.7)	61.6 (16.4)	67.6 (19.8)	67.0 (19.4)	57.2 (14.0)	42.7 (5.9)	26.9 (−2.8)	15.3 (−9.3)	40.6 (4.8)
Mean daily minimum °F (°C)	2.0 (−16.7)	5.3 (−14.8)	16.8 (−8.4)	28.6 (−1.9)	39.7 (4.3)	49.1 (9.5)	54.1 (12.3)	52.6 (11.4)	43.4 (6.3)	31.0 (−0.6)	17.5 (−8.1)	6.7 (−14.1)	28.9 (−1.7)
Mean minimum °F (°C)	−24.4 (−31.3)	−18.9 (−28.3)	−8.9 (−22.7)	12.1 (−11.1)	25.8 (−3.4)	39.0 (3.9)	44.7 (7.1)	41.3 (5.2)	28.2 (−2.1)	13.2 (−10.4)	−3.9 (−19.9)	−18.1 (−27.8)	−28.8 (−33.8)
Record low °F (°C)	−44 (−42)	−41 (−41)	−31 (−35)	−15 (−26)	12 (−11)	22 (−6)	35 (2)	32 (0)	10 (−12)	−9 (−23)	−29 (−34)	−41 (−41)	−44 (−42)
Average precipitation inches (mm)	0.39 (9.9)	0.47 (12)	0.52 (13)	1.16 (29)	2.17 (55)	3.24 (82)	2.64 (67)	1.78 (45)	1.07 (27)	0.80 (20)	0.40 (10)	0.49 (12)	15.13 (381.9)
Average snowfall inches (cm)	7.7 (20)	4.6 (12)	4.2 (11)	2.0 (5.1)	0.1 (0.25)	0.0 (0.0)	0.0 (0.0)	0.0 (0.0)	0.0 (0.0)	1.5 (3.8)	2.7 (6.9)	8.5 (22)	31.3 (81.05)
Average precipitation days (≥ 0.01 in)	3.7	3.6	3.9	6.0	8.1	10.4	8.2	6.0	4.9	4.5	3.2	3.1	65.6
Average snowy days (≥ 0.1 in)	2.6	2.8	2.1	0.9	0.1	0.0	0.0	0.0	0.0	0.7	2.1	2.4	13.7
Source 1: NOAA
Source 2: National Weather Service
