= Medicine Lake, Montana =

- Town
- Location of Medicine Lake, Montana

- Location in the United States
- Coordinates: 48°30′02″N 104°30′05″W
- Country: United States
- State: Montana
- County: Sheridan

Area
  - Total: 0.39 sq mi (1.02 km^{2})
  - Land: 0.39 sq mi (1.02 km^{2})
  - Water: 0 sq mi (0.00 km^{2})
- Elevation: 1,962 ft (598 m)

Population (2020)
  - Total: 244
  - Density: 617.5/sq mi (238.42/km^{2})
- Time zone: UTC-7 (Mountain (MST))
  - Summer (DST): UTC-6 (MDT)
- ZIP code: 59247
- Area code: 406
- FIPS code: 30-48775
- GNIS feature ID: 2412975
- Website: www.medicinelakemt.com

Medicine Lake is a town in Sheridan County, Montana, United States. The population was 244 at the 2020 census.

On July 5, 1937, Medicine Lake recorded a temperature of 117 °F (47 °C), setting the record for the highest temperature ever recorded in Montana.

== History ==
Edward Stubban named this place Flandrem for his home town in Norway and established a post office and store in 1906. The town moved about 2 miles with the construction of the Great Northern Railway in 1910. They changed the name to Medicine Lake after the nearby lake the Assiniboine referred to as Bda wauka, “Medicine water.”

On November 14, 2020, the high school football team, which co-ops with Froid, known as the RedHawks, won the 6-man State Championship. They defeated White Sulphur Springs 44–19 to finish the season 10–0. It was the first football state title for the school, which had finished 2nd in 1952, 1985 and 2000, when they were known as the Honkers.

On November 20, 2021, the undefeated RedHawks won back to back state titles with a 43–0 defeat of the Power-Dutton-Brady Titans on the road in Dutton, Montana. The win concluded the RedHawks' season with a 13–0 record and extended their winning streak to 23 games.

== Geography ==
According to the United States Census Bureau, the town has a total area of 0.40 square miles (1.04 km^{2}), all land.

=== Climate ===
According to the Köppen Climate Classification system, Medicine Lake has a semi-arid climate, abbreviated "BSk" on climate maps.

Climate data for Medicine Lake, Montana, 1991–2020 normals, extremes 1911–present
Month	Jan	Feb	Mar	Apr	May	Jun	Jul	Aug	Sep	Oct	Nov	Dec	Year
Record high °F (°C)	60 (16)	68 (20)	77 (25)	92 (33)	103 (39)	107 (42)	117 (47)	107 (42)	101 (38)	91 (33)	75 (24)	68 (20)	117 (47)
Mean maximum °F (°C)	43.3 (6.3)	45.9 (7.7)	60.3 (15.7)	76.5 (24.7)	84.8 (29.3)	90.3 (32.4)	95.4 (35.2)	96.0 (35.6)	91.1 (32.8)	78.1 (25.6)	60.0 (15.6)	45.6 (7.6)	98.2 (36.8)
Mean daily maximum °F (°C)	22.1 (−5.5)	26.4 (−3.1)	39.0 (3.9)	54.6 (12.6)	66.5 (19.2)	75.1 (23.9)	82.7 (28.2)	82.6 (28.1)	72.0 (22.2)	55.3 (12.9)	38.2 (3.4)	26.9 (−2.8)	53.5 (11.9)
Daily mean °F (°C)	11.0 (−11.7)	15.1 (−9.4)	27.6 (−2.4)	42.1 (5.6)	53.9 (12.2)	62.8 (17.1)	69.1 (20.6)	67.8 (19.9)	57.1 (13.9)	42.3 (5.7)	27.0 (−2.8)	16.1 (−8.8)	41.0 (5.0)
Mean daily minimum °F (°C)	−0.1 (−17.8)	3.9 (−15.6)	16.3 (−8.7)	29.6 (−1.3)	41.4 (5.2)	50.6 (10.3)	55.6 (13.1)	53.0 (11.7)	42.1 (5.6)	29.4 (−1.4)	15.8 (−9.0)	5.3 (−14.8)	28.6 (−1.9)
Mean minimum °F (°C)	−26.1 (−32.3)	−20.0 (−28.9)	−8.9 (−22.7)	13.0 (−10.6)	25.6 (−3.6)	37.6 (3.1)	43.3 (6.3)	40.1 (4.5)	26.0 (−3.3)	12.6 (−10.8)	−5.0 (−20.6)	−18.5 (−28.1)	−30.6 (−34.8)
Record low °F (°C)	−51 (−46)	−58 (−50)	−38 (−39)	−15 (−26)	8 (−13)	22 (−6)	30 (−1)	30 (−1)	9 (−13)	−10 (−23)	−31 (−35)	−46 (−43)	−58 (−50)
Average precipitation inches (mm)	0.33 (8.4)	0.16 (4.1)	0.42 (11)	0.93 (24)	2.39 (61)	2.90 (74)	2.65 (67)	1.54 (39)	1.17 (30)	0.89 (23)	0.36 (9.1)	0.32 (8.1)	14.06 (358.7)
Average precipitation days (≥ 0.01 in)	3.4	2.2	3.8	5.1	7.8	10.5	8.6	6.8	6.1	5.0	2.6	3.1	65.0
Source 1: NOAA
Source 2: National Weather Service

== Demographics ==
Historical population
Census	Pop.	Note	%±
1920	292		—
1930	384		31.5%
1940	396		3.1%
1950	454		14.6%
1960	452		−0.4%
1970	393		−13.1%
1980	408		3.8%
1990	357		−12.5%
2000	269		−24.6%
2010	225		−16.4%
2020	244		8.4%
U.S. Decennial Census

=== 2010 census ===
As of the census of 2010, there were 225 people, 109 households, and 65 families residing in the town. The population density was 562.5 inhabitants per square mile (217.2/km^{2}). There were 167 housing units at an average density of 417.5 per square mile (161.2/km^{2}). The racial makeup of the town was 90.7% White, 0.9% African American, 4.0% Native American, and 4.4% from two or more races.

There were 109 households, of which 24.8% had children under the age of 18 living with them, 40.4% were married couples living together, 12.8% had a female householder with no husband present, 6.4% had a male householder with no wife present, and 40.4% were non-families. 38.5% of all households were made up of individuals, and 14.7% had someone living alone who was 65 years of age or older. The average household size was 2.06 and the average family size was 2.74.

The median age in the town was 48.1 years. 24.4% of residents were under the age of 18; 4.6% were between the ages of 18 and 24; 17.8% were from 25 to 44; 34.8% were from 45 to 64; and 18.7% were 65 years of age or older. The gender makeup of the town was 49.3% male and 50.7% female.

=== 2000 census ===
As of the census of 2000, there were 269 people, 120 households, and 72 families residing in the town. The population density was 658.8 inhabitants per square mile (254.4/km^{2}). There were 165 housing units at an average density of 404.1 per square mile (156.0/km^{2}). The racial makeup of the town was 92.19% White, 3.72% Native American, 0.37% Asian, 0.37% Pacific Islander, and 3.35% from two or more races.

There were 120 households, out of which 28.3% had children under the age of 18 living with them, 50.0% were married couples living together, 6.7% had a female householder with no husband present, and 40.0% were non-families. 40.0% of all households were made up of individuals, and 15.0% had someone living alone who was 65 years of age or older. The average household size was 2.24 and the average family size was 2.97.

In the town, the population was spread out, with 26.4% under the age of 18, 7.1% from 18 to 24, 22.3% from 25 to 44, 28.3% from 45 to 64, and 16.0% who were 65 years of age or older. The median age was 41 years. For every 100 females there were 116.9 males. For every 100 females age 18 and over, there were 108.4 males.

The median income for a household in the town was $28,750, and the median income for a family was $35,694. Males had a median income of $26,000 versus $26,250 for females. The per capita income for the town was $16,405. About 7.2% of families and 7.2% of the population were below the poverty line, including 6.5% of those under the age of eighteen and 3.4% of those 65 or over.

== Education ==
The school district is Medicine Lake K-12 Schools. Medicine Lake School District educates students from kindergarten through 12th grade. Medicine Lake High School's team name is the Redhawks.
