= 2012 United States presidential election in Montana =

- November 6, 2012
- Turnout: 72.18 (▼2.32 pp)

Nominee	Mitt Romney	Barack Obama
Party	Republican	Democratic
Home state	Massachusetts	Illinois
Running mate	Paul Ryan	Joe Biden
Electoral vote	3	0
Popular vote	267,928	201,839
Percentage	55.30%	41.66%
County results
Romney
50–60%
60–70%
70–80%
80–90%
Obama
40–50%
50–60%
60–70%
President before election
Barack Obama
Democratic
Elected President
Barack Obama
Democratic

The 2012 United States presidential election in Montana took place on November 6, 2012, as part of the 2012 United States presidential election in which all 50 states plus the District of Columbia participated. Montana voters chose three electors to represent them in the Electoral College via a popular vote pitting incumbent Democratic President Barack Obama and his running mate, Vice President Joe Biden, against Republican challenger and former Massachusetts Governor Mitt Romney and his running mate, Congressman Paul Ryan.

Romney carried Montana with 55.30% of the vote to Obama's 41.66%, with a 13.64% margin of victory. Montana was the second-best state performance for Libertarian candidate Gary Johnson, carrying about 3% of the vote. Montana in 2012 and 2016 had a larger than ever margin for the Libertarian Party.

Romney performed much better than John McCain had in 2008, when he narrowly won over Obama with only a 2.38% margin of victory. Romney also won over five counties that voted for Obama in 2008. Most of the counties Obama won were either majority Native American (such as Big Horn, Blaine, Glacier, and Roosevelt) or have some of Montana's most populous cities and towns, such as Missoula County (containing its namesake city, the second largest in the state and home of the University of Montana) and Silver Bow County (home to Butte and Montana Tech). As of the 2024 presidential election, this is the last time that a Republican has won Gallatin County or that a Democrat has won Hill County or Roosevelt County.

Obama remains the only Democrat since statehood to win two terms in the White House without carrying Montana either time.

== Primary elections ==
=== Republican primary ===
2012 Montana Republican presidential caucuses
- June 16, 2012

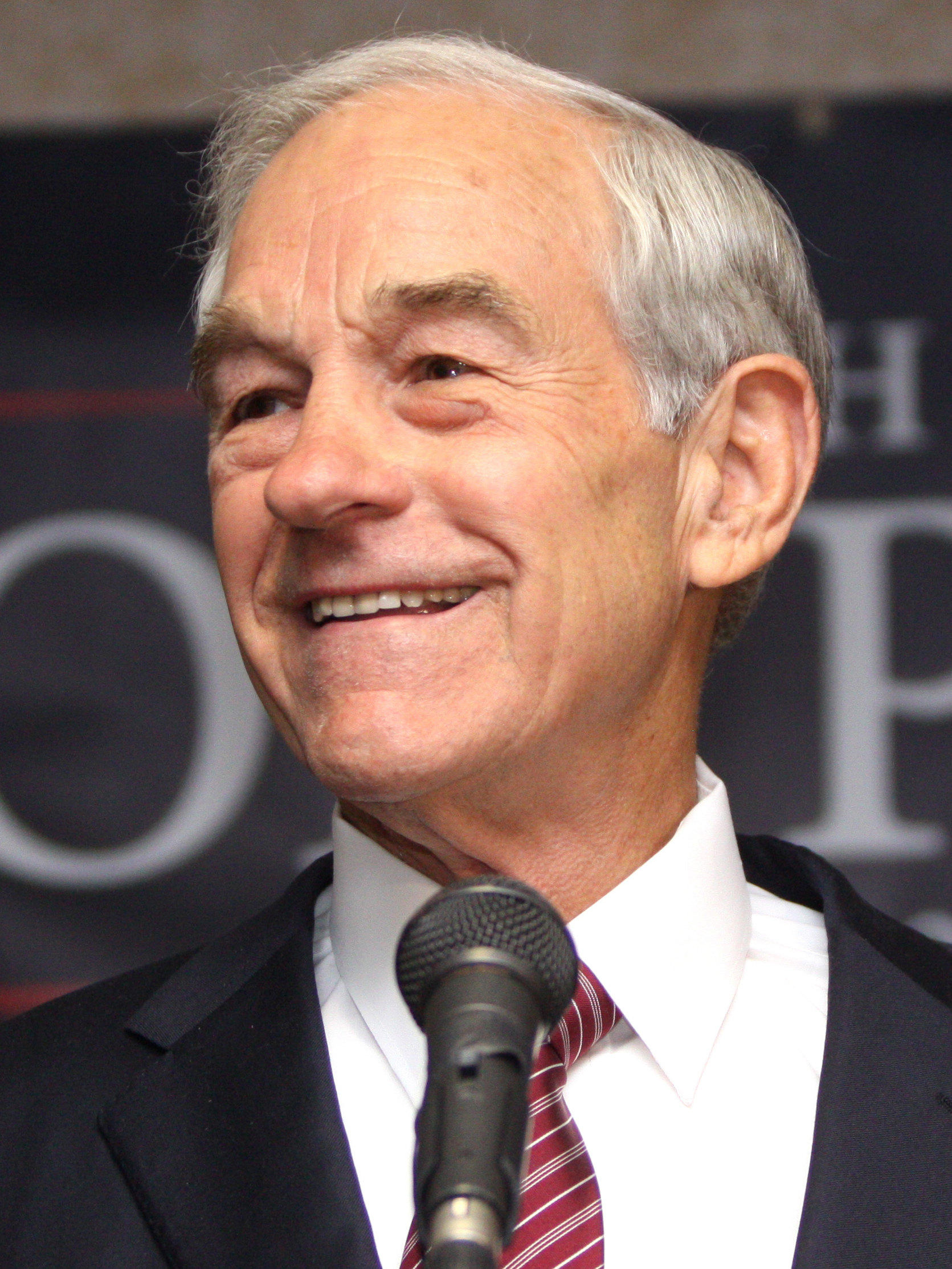

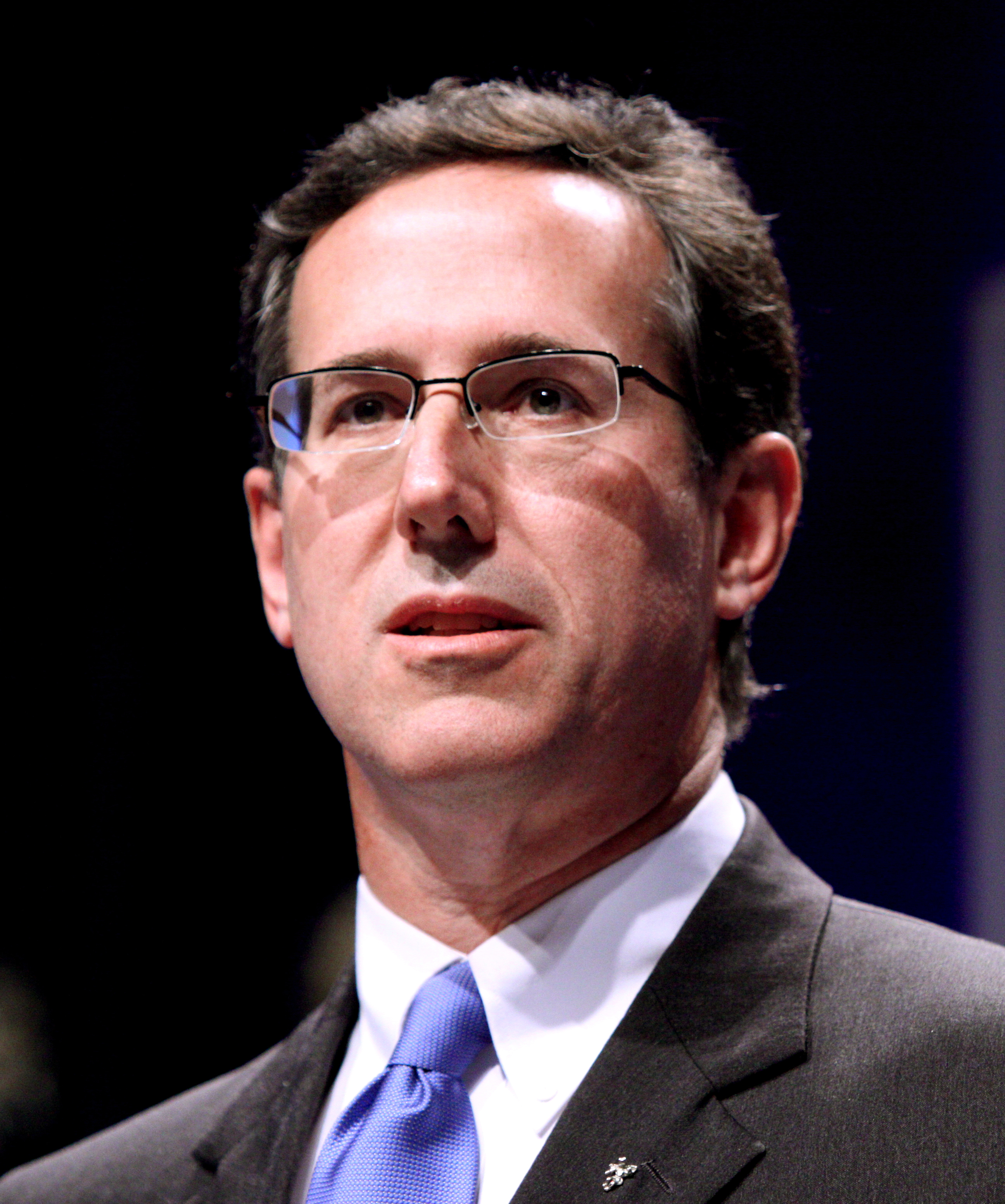
Candidate	Mitt Romney	Ron Paul	Rick Santorum
Home state	Massachusetts	Texas	Pennsylvania
- Montana results by county Mitt Romney (Note: Italicization indicates a withdrawn candidacy)

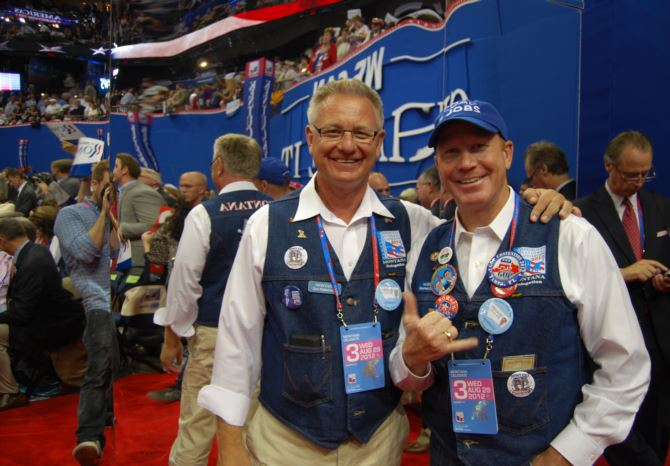
Members of the Montana delegation at the 2012 Republican National Convention

The Republican caucuses took place on June 14 to 16, 2012 as the Montana state convention. Ten days before, the state delegates were selected by the central committee in each county 23 delegates were to have been chosen, for a total of 26 delegates to go to the national convention. Prior to selecting delegates, a non-binding primary election was held June 5, 2012. Results were announced before the Republican National Convention in August.

2012 Montana Republican presidential primary
Candidate	Votes	Percentage	Delegates
Mitt Romney	96,121	68.4%	
Ron Paul	20,227	14.4%	
Rick Santorum	12,546	8.9%	
Newt Gingrich	6,107	4.3%	
No Preference	5,456	3.9%	
Unpledged delegates:			25
Total:	140,457		26

Key:	Withdrew prior to contest

== General election ==
=== Predictions ===
Source	Ranking	As of
Huffington Post	Safe R	November 6, 2012
CNN	Safe R	November 6, 2012
New York Times	Safe R	November 6, 2012
Washington Post	Safe R	November 6, 2012
RealClearPolitics	Solid R	November 6, 2012
Sabato's Crystal Ball	Solid R	November 5, 2012
FiveThirtyEight	Solid R	November 6, 2012

=== Results ===
2012 United States presidential election in Montana
Party	Candidate	Votes	%
Republican	Mitt Romney	267,928	55.30
Democratic	Barack Obama (incumbent)	201,839	41.66
Libertarian	Gary Johnson	14,165	2.93
Others	Others	116	0.02
Total votes		484,048	100.0

==== By county ====
County	Mitt Romney Republican		Barack Obama Democratic		Various candidates Other parties		Margin		Total
County	#	%	#	%	#	%	#	%	Total
Beaverhead	3,289	68.35%	1,371	28.49%	152	3.16%	1,918	39.86%	4,812
Big Horn	1,667	36.04%	2,882	62.30%	77	1.66%	-1,215	-26.26%	4,626
Blaine	1,178	41.20%	1,616	56.52%	65	2.28%	-438	-15.32%	2,859
Broadwater	2,152	71.47%	764	25.37%	95	3.16%	1,388	46.10%	3,011
Carbon	3,533	60.42%	2,146	36.70%	168	2.88%	1,387	23.72%	5,847
Carter	678	85.18%	96	12.06%	22	2.76%	582	73.12%	796
Cascade	18,345	53.06%	15,232	44.05%	999	2.89%	3,113	9.01%	34,576
Chouteau	1,758	62.32%	978	34.67%	85	3.01%	780	27.65%	2,821
Custer	3,373	62.87%	1,833	34.17%	159	2.96%	1,540	28.70%	5,365
Daniels	740	73.49%	237	23.54%	30	2.97%	503	49.95%	1,007
Dawson	3,029	68.48%	1,219	27.56%	175	3.96%	1,810	40.92%	4,423
Deer Lodge	1,448	32.47%	2,860	64.13%	152	3.40%	-1,412	-31.66%	4,460
Fallon	1,128	80.23%	237	16.86%	41	2.91%	891	63.37%	1,406
Fergus	4,257	70.12%	1,640	27.01%	174	2.87%	2,617	43.11%	6,071
Flathead	28,309	64.47%	13,892	31.64%	1,708	3.89%	14,417	32.83%	43,909
Gallatin	24,358	50.84%	21,961	45.84%	1,589	3.32%	2,397	5.00%	47,908
Garfield	622	88.73%	66	9.42%	13	1.85%	556	79.31%	701
Glacier	1,415	31.76%	2,924	65.63%	116	2.61%	-1,509	-33.87%	4,455
Golden Valley	351	73.28%	110	22.96%	18	3.76%	241	50.32%	479
Granite	1,107	64.93%	533	31.26%	65	3.81%	574	33.67%	1,705
Hill	3,164	46.36%	3,403	49.86%	258	3.78%	-239	-3.50%	6,825
Jefferson	4,055	62.18%	2,272	34.84%	194	2.98%	1,783	27.34%	6,521
Judith Basin	854	70.29%	337	27.74%	24	1.97%	517	42.55%	1,215
Lake	7,135	53.63%	5,805	43.63%	364	2.74%	1,330	10.00%	13,304
Lewis and Clark	16,803	50.43%	15,620	46.88%	895	2.69%	1,183	3.55%	33,318
Liberty	702	70.34%	257	25.75%	39	3.91%	445	44.59%	998
Lincoln	6,057	68.13%	2,552	28.71%	281	3.16%	3,505	39.42%	8,890
Madison	3,130	69.06%	1,289	28.44%	113	2.50%	1,841	40.62%	4,532
McCone	745	75.03%	223	22.46%	25	2.51%	522	52.57%	993
Meagher	670	68.93%	269	27.67%	33	3.40%	401	41.26%	972
Mineral	1,216	60.17%	700	34.64%	105	5.19%	516	25.53%	2,021
Missoula	22,652	39.58%	32,824	57.35%	1,756	3.07%	-10,172	-17.77%	57,232
Musselshell	1,833	76.15%	492	20.44%	82	3.41%	1,341	55.71%	2,407
Park	4,709	53.71%	3,783	43.15%	276	3.14%	926	10.56%	8,768
Petroleum	240	80.54%	49	16.44%	9	3.02%	191	64.10%	298
Phillips	1,688	75.76%	471	21.14%	69	3.10%	1,217	54.62%	2,228
Pondera	1,673	61.53%	975	35.86%	71	2.61%	698	25.67%	2,719
Powder River	833	81.11%	170	16.55%	24	2.34%	663	64.56%	1,027
Powell	1,806	65.03%	888	31.98%	83	2.99%	918	33.05%	2,777
Prairie	520	73.97%	167	23.76%	16	2.27%	353	50.21%	703
Ravalli	14,307	64.41%	7,285	32.80%	620	2.79%	7,022	31.61%	22,212
Richland	3,510	75.52%	1,002	21.56%	136	2.92%	2,508	53.96%	4,648
Roosevelt	1,514	41.23%	2,086	56.81%	72	1.96%	-572	-15.58%	3,672
Rosebud	2,004	56.88%	1,422	40.36%	152	2.76%	582	16.52%	3,523
Sanders	3,980	67.45%	1,720	29.15%	201	3.40%	2,260	38.30%	5,901
Sheridan	1,207	62.60%	665	34.49%	56	2.91%	542	28.11%	1,928
Silver Bow	5,430	32.41%	10,857	64.79%	469	2.80%	-5,427	-32.38%	16,756
Stillwater	3,337	70.97%	1,248	26.54%	117	2.49%	2,089	44.43%	4,702
Sweet Grass	1,594	75.30%	475	22.44%	48	2.26%	1,119	52.86%	2,117
Teton	2,113	64.40%	1,082	32.98%	86	2.62%	1,031	31.42%	3,281
Toole	1,440	68.51%	582	27.69%	80	3.80%	858	40.82%	2,102
Treasure	319	70.11%	114	25.05%	22	4.84%	205	45.06%	455
Valley	2,337	60.56%	1,385	35.89%	137	3.55%	952	24.67%	3,859
Wheatland	693	69.86%	272	27.42%	27	2.72%	421	42.44%	992
Wibaux	421	77.39%	98	18.01%	25	4.60%	323	59.38%	544
Yellowstone	40,500	58.86%	26,403	38.37%	1,904	2.77%	14,097	20.49%	68,807
Totals	267,928	55.30%	201,839	41.66%	14,717	3.04%	66,089	13.64%	484,484

Counties that flipped from Democratic to Republican

- Cascade (largest city: Great Falls)
- Gallatin (largest city: Bozeman)
- Lake (largest city: Polson)
- Lewis and Clark (largest city: Helena)
- Rosebud (largest city: Colstrip)

==== By congressional district ====
Due to the state's low population, only one congressional district is allocated, the At-Large District. This district covers the entire state, and thus is equivalent to the statewide election results.

District	Romney	Obama	Representative
At-large	55.35%	41.7%	Steve Daines

== See also ==
- United States presidential elections in Montana
- 2012 Republican Party presidential debates and forums
- 2012 Republican Party presidential primaries
- Results of the 2012 Republican Party presidential primaries
- Montana Republican Party
