= 2008 United States presidential election in Montana =

- November 4, 2008
- Turnout: 74.5% (▲3.1 pp)

Nominee	John McCain	Barack Obama
Party	Republican	Democratic
Home state	Arizona	Illinois
Running mate	Sarah Palin	Joe Biden
Electoral vote	3	0
Popular vote	243,882	232,159
Percentage	49.49%	47.11%
County results
McCain
40–50%
50–60%
60–70%
70–80%
80–90%
Obama
40–50%
50–60%
60–70%
President before election
George W. Bush
Republican
Elected President
Barack Obama
Democratic

The 2008 United States presidential election in Montana took place on November 4, 2008, and was part of the 2008 United States presidential election. Voters chose three representatives, or electors to the Electoral College, who voted for president and vice president.

Montana was won by Republican nominee John McCain by 11,273 votes, a 2.38% margin of victory. Before the election, Montana was initially viewed as safe Republican, but was viewed as lean Republican or toss-up in the final weeks. Historically the state is a Republican stronghold, but polls during the 2008 election showed Democrat Barack Obama just narrowly trailing Republican John McCain within the margin of error. On election day, McCain narrowly carried Montana. It was the fourth-closest state in the nation, behind Missouri, North Carolina, and Indiana, Missouri being a former bellwether state, and the other three being traditionally Republican states.

Despite the fact that Bill Clinton carried the state in 1992, Barack Obama's 47.11% of the vote was (and as of 2024 remains) the highest percent of the vote received by any Democratic candidate for president since 1964. Bill Clinton's victory in 1992 and near miss in 1996 were attributed to Ross Perot's strong third party candidacy in 1992 and 1996, the only other elections since 1964 when Montana was decided by under 5%. Obama was able to flip seven of Montana's counties from Republican to Democratic compared to the 2004 election. The election was the last in which Montana was considered to be a swing state by some outlets.

== Primaries ==
- 2008 Montana Democratic presidential primary
- 2008 Montana Republican presidential caucuses and primary

== Campaign ==
=== Predictions ===
There were 15 news organizations who made state-by-state predictions of the election. Here are their last predictions before election day:

Source	Ranking
D.C. Political Report	Likely R
Cook Political Report	Toss-up
The Takeaway	Lean R
Electoral-vote.com	Lean R
Washington Post	Lean R
Politico	Lean R
RealClearPolitics	Toss-up
FiveThirtyEight	Toss-up
The New York Times	Lean R
CNN	Toss-up
NPR	Lean R
MSNBC	Toss-up
Fox News	Likely R
Associated Press	Likely R
Rasmussen Reports	Toss-up

=== Polling ===
Although Republican George W. Bush of Texas carried Montana by double digits in both 2000 and 2004, polls taken throughout July indicated a close race between Republican John McCain of Arizona and Democrat Barack Obama of Illinois. When Governor Sarah Palin of Alaska was announced as McCain's running mate in late August, however, McCain took a double-digit lead in the state that lasted until the middle of October, when polling once again showed the two candidates within striking distance of each other in the state. When the actual 2008 presidential election took place, McCain carried the state by about 2.38%. The state's results were significantly closer than they were in the 2004 election when George W. Bush carried the state by a margin of 20 points.

=== Fundraising ===
John McCain raised a total of $386,940 in the state. Barack Obama raised $1,089,874.

=== Advertising and visits ===
Obama and his interest groups spent $1,732,467. McCain and his interest groups spent just $134,805. The Democratic ticket visited the state three times and McCain did not visit the state.

== Analysis ==
Montana, a Republican-leaning state, has voted for the Republican presidential nominee in every election since 1968, except in 1992, when the state narrowly supported Democrat Bill Clinton to Republican George H. W. Bush.

Obama did very well among the Democratic base of Montana, which consists of three sections. Students in Missoula County, which is home to the University of Montana, helped him win a three-to-two margin there. In the southwest, Obama won more than 65% of the vote in Deer Lodge County and Silver Bow County—Democratic strongholds which have voted Republican only twice since 1912; Obama also became the first Democratic presidential nominee to win Gallatin County, home to Bozeman, since Franklin D. Roosevelt in 1944. Finally, Native Americans gave Obama strong support; in the eastern part of the state, Obama only won counties in which Native Americans composed at least 30% of the population.

McCain's base was in the eastern part of the state, which is less unionized and more rural. It is home to more ranchers and fewer miners than elsewhere. Only five counties voted Democratic in the east. In Western Montana, McCain generally won wherever Obama's Democratic base was lacking. His biggest margins came from the region bordering the GOP bastion of Idaho.

There was also a relatively high third-party vote, totaling around four percent. The Montana Constitution Party ran libertarian-leaning Republican U.S. Representative Ron Paul of Texas on their line (against his wishes), winning 2.17% of the vote in Montana, which was the highest statewide percentage total for any third-party candidate in the 2008 presidential election. A significant number of write-in candidates also ran in the state, with some beating third-party candidates.

During the same election, incumbent Democratic Governor Brian Schweitzer was reelected to a second term in a landslide over Republican Roy Brown and Libertarian Stan Jones. Winning by more than a two-to-one margin, Schweitzer received 65.21% of the vote while Brown took in 32.77% and Jones got 2.03%. Also during the same election, incumbent Democratic Senator Max Baucus was handily reelected to a sixth term over perennial candidate Bob Kelleher running as a Republican, no third-party candidate was in the race. Due to Kelleher's policies, such as adopting a parliamentary system in the United States, adopting a single-payer healthcare system, and nationalizing American oil and gas industries, he received no support from Montana GOP, and Baucus defeated Kelleher by nearly a 3-to-1 margin, taking in 72.92% over Kelleher's 27.08% and winning every single county in the state. At the state level, however, Republicans picked up three seats in the Montana Senate and gained control of the chamber. Democrats picked up the office of Secretary of State.

As of the 2024 presidential election, this is the last election where Montana was seriously contested, as well as the last one in which Lake County, Cascade County, Rosebud County, and Lewis and Clark County voted for the Democratic candidate. This is the last time the Big Sky Country would be decided by a single-digit margin, and the last time a candidate won the state with less than half of the vote. Obama became the first ever Democrat to win the White House without carrying Mineral or Sheridan Counties.

== Results ==
2008 United States presidential election in Montana
Party	Candidate	Running mate	Votes	Percentage	Electoral votes
Republican	John McCain	Sarah Palin	243,882	49.49%	3
Democratic	Barack Obama	Joe Biden	232,159	47.11%	0
Constitution	Ron Paul (no campaign)	Michael Peroutka	10,669	2.17%	0
Independent	Ralph Nader	Matt Gonzalez	3,699	0.75%	0
Libertarian	Bob Barr	Wayne Allyn Root	1,358	0.28%	0
(write-in)	Write-in candidates		817	0.17%	0
Constitution	Chuck Baldwin (write-in)	Darrell Castle	143	0.03%	0
Green	Cynthia McKinney (write-in)	Rosa Clemente	23	0.00%	0
Totals			492,750	100.00%	3
Voter turnout (Voting age population)					67.4%

=== By county ===
County	John McCain Republican		Barack Obama Democratic		Various candidates Other parties		Margin		Total
County	#	%	#	%	#	%	#	%	Total
Beaverhead	3,008	63.15%	1,617	33.95%	138	2.90%	1,391	29.20%	4,763
Big Horn	1,628	31.19%	3,516	67.37%	75	1.44%	-1,888	-36.18%	5,219
Blaine	1,139	38.93%	1,702	58.17%	85	2.90%	-563	-19.24%	2,926
Broadwater	1,875	66.80%	857	30.53%	75	2.67%	1,018	36.27%	2,807
Carbon	3,108	54.05%	2,443	42.49%	199	3.46%	665	11.56%	5,750
Carter	573	79.36%	111	15.37%	38	5.27%	462	63.99%	722
Cascade	16,857	47.62%	17,664	49.90%	875	2.48%	-807	-2.28%	35,396
Chouteau	1,634	57.11%	1,122	39.22%	105	3.67%	512	17.89%	2,861
Custer	3,047	55.89%	2,267	41.58%	138	2.53%	780	14.31%	5,452
Daniels	694	64.68%	343	31.97%	36	3.35%	351	32.71%	1,073
Dawson	2,639	59.38%	1,593	35.85%	212	4.77%	1,046	23.53%	4,444
Deer Lodge	1,502	29.60%	3,402	67.05%	170	3.35%	-1,900	-37.45%	5,074
Fallon	1,064	74.25%	318	22.19%	51	3.56%	746	52.06%	1,433
Fergus	4,108	65.92%	1,933	31.02%	191	3.06%	2,175	34.90%	6,232
Flathead	25,559	58.43%	16,138	36.89%	2,047	4.68%	9,421	21.54%	43,744
Gallatin	22,578	46.77%	24,205	50.14%	1,489	3.09%	-1,627	-3.37%	48,272
Garfield	598	82.26%	110	15.13%	19	2.61%	488	67.13%	727
Glacier	1,451	29.19%	3,423	68.86%	97	1.95%	-1,972	-39.67%	4,971
Golden Valley	343	69.72%	124	25.20%	25	5.08%	219	44.52%	492
Granite	1,013	58.96%	601	34.98%	104	6.06%	412	23.98%	1,718
Hill	2,787	42.07%	3,596	54.28%	242	3.65%	-809	-12.21%	6,625
Jefferson	3,538	55.80%	2,582	40.72%	221	3.48%	956	15.08%	6,341
Judith Basin	801	64.81%	397	32.12%	38	3.07%	404	32.69%	1,236
Lake	6,498	46.56%	6,766	48.48%	692	4.96%	-268	-1.92%	13,956
Lewis and Clark	14,966	45.31%	17,114	51.82%	949	2.87%	-2,148	-6.51%	33,029
Liberty	594	59.34%	367	36.66%	40	4.00%	227	22.68%	1,001
Lincoln	5,704	61.82%	3,025	32.78%	498	5.40%	2,679	29.04%	9,227
Madison	2,822	61.78%	1,607	35.18%	139	3.04%	1,215	26.60%	4,568
McCone	726	66.54%	321	29.42%	44	4.04%	405	37.12%	1,091
Meagher	624	64.60%	298	30.85%	44	4.55%	326	33.75%	966
Mineral	1,053	52.73%	845	42.31%	99	4.96%	208	10.42%	1,997
Missoula	20,743	34.99%	36,531	61.63%	2,003	3.38%	-15,788	-26.64%	59,277
Musselshell	1,581	68.56%	636	27.58%	89	3.86%	945	40.98%	2,306
Park	4,376	49.18%	4,173	46.90%	349	3.92%	203	2.28%	8,898
Petroleum	227	75.67%	68	22.67%	5	1.66%	159	53.00%	300
Phillips	1,423	67.03%	638	30.05%	62	2.92%	785	36.98%	2,123
Pondera	1,588	55.04%	1,223	42.39%	74	2.57%	365	12.65%	2,885
Powder River	802	77.26%	208	20.04%	28	2.70%	594	57.22%	1,038
Powell	1,683	59.81%	1,021	36.28%	110	3.91%	662	23.53%	2,814
Prairie	503	68.44%	211	28.71%	21	2.85%	292	39.73%	735
Ravalli	13,002	58.83%	8,400	38.01%	699	3.16%	4,602	20.82%	22,101
Richland	3,184	70.50%	1,203	26.64%	129	2.86%	1,981	43.86%	4,516
Roosevelt	1,473	35.47%	2,564	61.74%	116	2.79%	-1,091	-26.27%	4,153
Rosebud	1,768	46.40%	1,919	50.37%	123	3.23%	-151	-3.97%	3,810
Sanders	3,563	60.72%	1,970	33.57%	335	5.71%	1,593	27.15%	5,868
Sheridan	987	49.20%	953	47.51%	66	3.29%	34	1.69%	2,006
Silver Bow	4,818	28.27%	11,676	68.51%	548	3.22%	-6,858	-40.24%	17,042
Stillwater	2,991	64.09%	1,512	32.40%	164	3.51%	1,479	31.69%	4,667
Sweet Grass	1,494	71.72%	541	25.97%	48	2.31%	953	45.75%	2,083
Teton	1,874	57.27%	1,294	39.55%	104	3.18%	580	17.72%	3,272
Toole	1,317	62.09%	737	34.75%	67	3.16%	580	27.34%	2,121
Treasure	314	64.61%	156	32.10%	16	3.29%	158	32.51%	486
Valley	2,121	54.23%	1,645	42.06%	145	3.71%	476	12.17%	3,911
Wheatland	657	66.84%	289	29.40%	37	3.76%	368	37.44%	983
Wibaux	379	67.32%	146	25.93%	38	6.75%	233	41.39%	563
Yellowstone	36,483	51.62%	32,038	45.33%	2,158	3.05%	4,445	6.29%	70,679
Totals	243,882	49.49%	232,159	47.11%	16,709	3.39%	11,723	2.38%	492,750

Counties that flipped from Republican to Democratic

- Blaine (largest city: Chinook)
- Cascade (largest city: Great Falls)
- Gallatin (largest city: Bozeman)
- Hill (largest city: Havre)
- Lake (largest city: Polson)
- Lewis and Clark (largest city: Helena)
- Rosebud (largest city: Colstrip)

=== By congressional district ===
Due to the state's low population, only one congressional district was allocated at the time, the at-large district. This district covered the entire state, and thus was equivalent to the statewide election results.

District	McCain	Obama	Representative
At-large	49.49%	47.11%	Denny Rehberg

== Electors ==
Technically the voters of Montana cast their ballots for electors: representatives to the Electoral College. Montana was allocated 3 electors because it had 1 congressional district and 2 senators. All candidates who appear on the ballot or qualify to receive write-in votes must submit a list of 3 electors, who pledge to vote for their candidate and their running mate. Whoever wins the majority of votes in the state is awarded all 3 electoral votes. Their chosen electors then vote for president and vice president. Although electors are pledged to their candidate and running mate, they are not obligated to vote for them. An elector who votes for someone other than their candidate is known as a faithless elector.

The electors of each state and the District of Columbia met on December 15, 2008, to cast their votes for president and vice president. The Electoral College itself never meets as one body. Instead the electors from each state and the District of Columbia met in their respective capitols.

The following were the members of the Electoral College from the state. All 3 were pledged to John McCain and Sarah Palin:

1. Thelma Baker
2. John Brenden
3. Errol Galt

== See also ==
- United States presidential elections in Montana
- Presidency of Barack Obama
