= Turner Colony, Montana =

- Census-designated place
- Location within Montana Location within the United States
- Coordinates: 48°45′47″N 108°25′48″W
- Country: United States
- State: Montana
- County: Blaine

Area
  - Total: 0.61 sq mi (1.58 km^{2})
  - Land: 0.61 sq mi (1.58 km^{2})
  - Water: 0 sq mi (0.00 km^{2})
- Elevation: 3,084 ft (940 m)

Population (2020)
  - Total: 135
  - Density: 220.7/sq mi (85.22/km^{2})
- Time zone: UTC-7 (Mountain (MST))
  - Summer (DST): UTC-6 (MDT)
- ZIP Code: 59542 (Turner)
- Area code: 406
- FIPS code: 30-75258
- GNIS feature ID: 2804271

Turner Colony is a Hutterite community and census-designated place (CDP) in Blaine County, Montana, United States. As of the 2020 census, Turner Colony had a population of 135.

It is in the northeast part of the county, on the east side of Secondary Highway 241, 7 miles (11 km) south of Turner and 24 miles (39 km) northeast of Harlem.

Turner Colony was first listed as a CDP prior to the 2020 census.

== Demographics ==
Historical population
Census	Pop.	Note	%±
2020	135		—
U.S. Decennial Census

== Education ==
It is in the Turner Elementary School District and the Turner High School District. Both are components of Turner Public Schools.
