= North Harlem Colony, Montana =

- Census-designated place
- Location within Montana Location within the United States
- Coordinates: 48°35′06″N 108°45′10″W
- Country: United States
- State: Montana
- County: Blaine

Area
  - Total: 0.29 sq mi (0.76 km^{2})
  - Land: 0.29 sq mi (0.76 km^{2})
  - Water: 0 sq mi (0.00 km^{2})
- Elevation: 2,595 ft (791 m)

Population (2020)
  - Total: 26
  - Density: 88.9/sq mi (34.31/km^{2})
- Time zone: UTC-7 (Mountain (MST))
  - Summer (DST): UTC-6 (MDT)
- ZIP Code: 59526 (Harlem)
- Area code: 406
- FIPS code: 30-54684
- GNIS feature ID: 2804270

North Harlem Colony is a Hutterite community and census-designated place (CDP) in Blaine County, Montana, United States. As of the 2020 census, North Harlem Colony had a population of 26. It is in the northeast part of the county, half a mile east of Secondary Highway 241 and 4 miles (6 km) north of Harlem and U.S. Route 2. It sits atop a 100-foot-high (30 m) bluff on the east side of Forgey Creek, a southeast-flowing tributary of the Milk River.

North Harlem Colony was first listed as a CDP prior to the 2020 census.

== Demographics ==
Historical population
Census	Pop.	Note	%±
2020	26		—
U.S. Decennial Census

== Education ==
It is in the North Harlem Colony Elementary School District and the Harlem High School District.
