= Kenneth Hansen =

Kenneth Hansen may refer to:

- Kenneth Hansen (speedway rider) (born 1987), Danish motorcycle speedway rider
- Kenneth Hansen (cyclist) (born 1991), Danish cyclo-cross cyclist
- Kenneth Hansen (rallycross) (born 1960), Swedish rallycross driver

== See also ==
- Ken Hansen (born 1951), member of the Montana Senate
- Kenn Hansen (born 1980), Danish football referee
