= Hogeland, Montana =

Unincorporated community in Montana, United States

- Unincorporated community
- Location within Montana Location within the United States
- Coordinates: 48°51′17″N 108°39′45″W
- Country: United States
- State: Montana
- County: Blaine

Area
  - Total: 0.51 sq mi (1.32 km^{2})
  - Land: 0.51 sq mi (1.32 km^{2})
  - Water: 0 sq mi (0.00 km^{2})
- Elevation: 3,146 ft (959 m)

Population (2020)
  - Total: 14
  - Density: 27.5/sq mi (10.61/km^{2})
- Time zone: UTC-7 (Mountain (MST))
  - Summer (DST): UTC-6 (MDT)
- ZIP code: 59529
- Area code: 406
- GNIS feature ID: 2804269

Hogeland is an unincorporated community in Blaine County, Montana, United States. As of the 2020 census, Hogeland had a population of 14. Hogeland is 23 miles (37 km) north-northeast of Harlem. Hogeland has a post office with ZIP code 59529.

== History ==
The town began as a station stop for the Great Northern Railway in about 1928. It was named for A. H. Hogeland, the chief engineer.

== Climate ==
According to the Köppen Climate Classification system, Hogeland has a semi-arid climate, abbreviated "BSk" on climate maps.

== Education ==
It is in the Turner Elementary School District and the Turner High School District. Both are components of Turner Public Schools.
