= Hartland Colony, Montana =

- Census-designated place
- Location within Montana Location within the United States
- Coordinates: 48°57′07″N 109°26′54″W
- Country: United States
- State: Montana
- County: Blaine

Area
  - Total: 0.19 sq mi (0.48 km^{2})
  - Land: 0.19 sq mi (0.48 km^{2})
  - Water: 0 sq mi (0.00 km^{2})
- Elevation: 2,766 ft (843 m)

Population (2020)
  - Total: 0
  - Density: 0/sq mi (0/km^{2})
- Time zone: UTC-7 (Mountain (MST))
  - Summer (DST): UTC-6 (MDT)
- ZIP Code: 59523 (Chinook)
- Area code: 406
- FIPS code: 30-34584
- GNIS feature ID: 2804266

Hartland Colony is a Hutterite community and census-designated place (CDP) in Blaine County, Montana, United States. As of the 2020 census, Hartland Colony had a population of 0. It is in the northwest corner of the county, 34 miles (55 km) northwest of Chinook, the county seat, and less than 4 miles (6 km) south of the Canadian border.

Hartland Colony was first listed as a CDP prior to the 2020 census.

== Demographics ==
Historical population
Census	Pop.	Note	%±
2020	0		—
U.S. Decennial Census

== Education ==
It is in the Chinook Elementary School District and the Chinook High School District. Both are components of Chinook Public Schools.
