= Black Coulee National Wildlife Refuge =

- IUCN category IV (habitat/species management area)
- Location within the United States
- Location: Blaine County, Montana, USA
- Nearest city: Malta, MT
- Coordinates: 48°41′23″N 108°24′42″W
- Area: 1,308 acres (529 ha) in 2010
- Established: 1938
- Governing body: U.S. Fish and Wildlife Service
- Website: Black Coulee National Wildlife Refuge

Black Coulee National Wildlife Refuge is a 1,308-acre (529 ha) National Wildlife Refuge in the U.S. state of Montana near the Canada–US border. This very remote refuge is a part of the Bowdoin Wetland Management District (WMD), and is unstaffed. The refuge is managed from Bowdoin National Wildlife Refuge.
