= Blaine County, Montana =

County in Montana, United States

- County
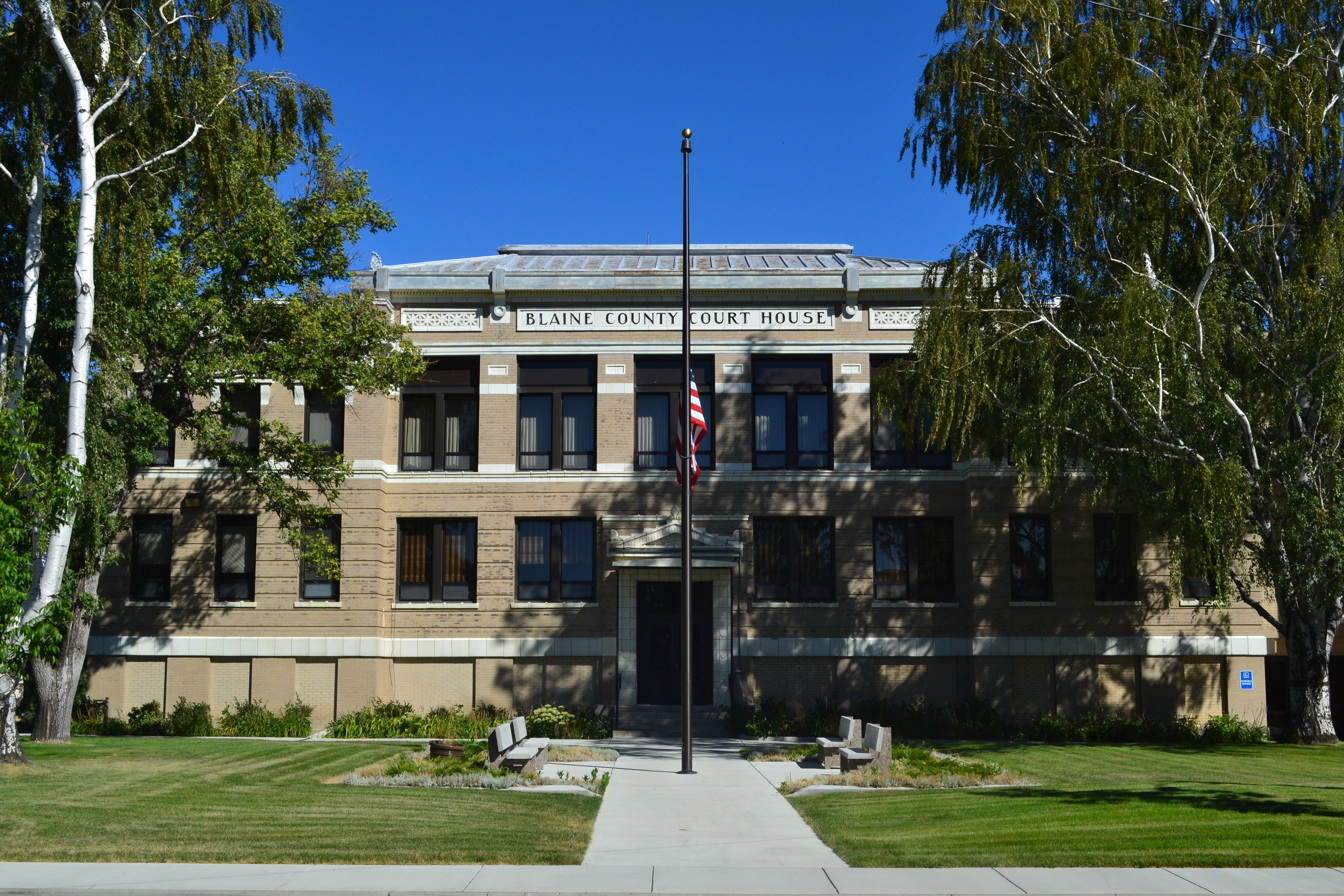
- Blaine County Courthouse in Chinook

- Location within the U.S. state of Montana
- Coordinates: 48°26′N 108°58′W
- Country: United States
- State: Montana
- Founded: 1912
- Named for: James G. Blaine
- Seat: Chinook
- Largest community: Fort Belknap Agency

Area
  - Total: 4,239 sq mi (10,980 km^{2})
  - Land: 4,228 sq mi (10,950 km^{2})
  - Water: 11 sq mi (28 km^{2}) 0.3%

Population (2020)
  - Total: 7,044
  - Estimate (2025): 6,860 ▼
  - Density: 1.6/sq mi (0.62/km^{2})
- Time zone: UTC−7 (Mountain)
  - Summer (DST): UTC−6 (MDT)
- Congressional district: 2nd
- Website: blainecounty-mt.gov
- Montana county number 24

Blaine County is a county in the U.S. state of Montana. As of the 2020 census, the population was 7,044. Its county seat is Chinook. The county was named for James G. Blaine, former United States Secretary of State. It is on the north line of the state, and thus shares the southern border of Canada opposite Saskatchewan.

== History ==
In 1912 Blaine, Phillips and Hill counties were formed from the area of Chouteau County. The original boundary of Blaine County included a portion of land in the west that is now included in Phillips County.

== Geography ==
According to the United States Census Bureau, the county has a total area of 4,239 square miles (10,980 km^{2}), of which 4,228 square miles (10,950 km^{2}) is land and 11 square miles (28 km^{2}) (0.3%) is water.

The majority of Fort Belknap Indian Reservation is located in the southeastern part of the county.

Features of the area include the Milk River, Bears Paw Mountains, and the Little Rocky Mountains.

=== Adjacent counties and rural municipalities ===
- Hill County - west
- Chouteau County - southwest
- Fergus County - south
- Phillips County - east
- Rural Municipality (RM) of Reno No. 51, Saskatchewan (SK) - northwest
- RM of Frontier No. 19, Saskatchewan, SK - north
- RM of Lone Tree No. 18, Saskatchewan, SK - northeast

=== National protected areas ===
- Black Coulee National Wildlife Refuge
- Nez Perce National Historical Park (part)
- Upper Missouri River Breaks National Monument (part)

== Demographics ==
Historical population
| Census | Pop. | Note | %± |
|---|---|---|---|
| 1920 | 9,057 | | — |
| 1930 | 9,006 | | −0.6% |
| 1940 | 9,566 | | 6.2% |
| 1950 | 8,516 | | −11.0% |
| 1960 | 8,091 | | −5.0% |
| 1970 | 6,727 | | −16.9% |
| 1980 | 6,999 | | 4.0% |
| 1990 | 6,728 | | −3.9% |
| 2000 | 7,009 | | 4.2% |
| 2010 | 6,491 | | −7.4% |
| 2020 | 7,044 | | 8.5% |
| 2025 (est.) | 6,860 | ▼ | −2.6% |
U.S. Decennial Census:

=== 2020 census ===
As of the 2020 census, the county had a population of 7,044. Of the residents, 29.5% were under the age of 18 and 15.7% were 65 years of age or older; the median age was 34.5 years. For every 100 females there were 99.5 males, and for every 100 females age 18 and over there were 98.2 males. 0.0% of residents lived in urban areas and 100.0% lived in rural areas.

The racial makeup of the county was 42.0% White, 0.2% Black or African American, 52.8% American Indian and Alaska Native, 0.2% Asian, 0.7% from some other race, and 4.2% from two or more races. Hispanic or Latino residents of any race comprised 2.2% of the population.

There were 2,467 households in the county, of which 38.2% had children under the age of 18 living with them and 29.9% had a female householder with no spouse or partner present. About 27.5% of all households were made up of individuals and 11.6% had someone living alone who was 65 years of age or older.

There were 2,824 housing units, of which 12.6% were vacant. Among occupied housing units, 61.0% were owner-occupied and 39.0% were renter-occupied. The homeowner vacancy rate was 1.5% and the rental vacancy rate was 6.2%.

=== 2010 census ===
As of the 2010 census, there were 6,491 people, 2,357 households, and 1,604 families living in the county. The population density was 1.5 inhabitants per square mile (0.58 inhabitants/km^{2}). There were 2,843 housing units at an average density of 0.7 units per square mile (0.27 units/km^{2}). The racial makeup of the county was 49.4% American Indian, 48.2% white, 0.1% black or African American, 0.1% Asian, 0.2% from other races, and 2.0% from two or more races. Those of Hispanic or Latino origin made up 1.8% of the population. In terms of ancestry, 23.0% were German, 9.2% were Norwegian, 6.6% were Irish, 5.7% were English, and 2.0% were American.

Of the 2,357 households, 39.2% had children under the age of 18 living with them, 45.6% were married couples living together, 16.0% had a female householder with no husband present, 31.9% were non-families, and 28.7% of all households were made up of individuals. The average household size was 2.66 and the average family size was 3.28. The median age was 35.1 years.

The median income for a household in the county was $37,034 and the median income for a family was $40,890. Males had a median income of $32,320 versus $28,986 for females. The per capita income for the county was $16,813. About 23.6% of families and 29.0% of the population were below the poverty line, including 44.6% of those under age 18 and 10.6% of those age 65 or over.

== Politics ==
Blaine County is the most consistent on the list of election bellwether counties in the United States, having voted for the winning presidential candidate in all but two elections held in its history. After backing Theodore Roosevelt against Woodrow Wilson in the county's inaugural 1912 election, Blaine County has been won by the winner of the presidential election in every election except that of 1988, held during the aftermath of a major drought and farm crisis; Michael Dukakis won the county by 58 votes. During two other drought years on the Great Plains, Adlai Stevenson II in 1956 and Gerald Ford in 1976 also came close to breaking the county's streak, losing by even smaller vote margins than George H. W. Bush. The county's swing status comes from the fact that it contains the Fort Belknap Indian Reservation, which trends Democratic, with the rest of the county voting strongly Republican. Since 2016, the trends on the Reservation have been a heavy factor in the county's leaning. The strongest Democratic shift in the county in 2020 and in turn the strongest Republican shift in 2024 each occurred on the Reservation, while the rest of the county simply shifted slightly more Republican in both. This pushed the county majority to go to Biden in 2020 and to Trump in 2024.

United States presidential election results for Blaine County, Montana
| Year | Republican | | Democratic | | Third party(ies) | |
| Year | No. | % | No. | % | No. | % |
|---|---|---|---|---|---|---|
| 1912 | 204 | 17.94% | 318 | 27.97% | 615 | 54.09% |
| 1916 | 857 | 39.13% | 1,261 | 57.58% | 72 | 3.29% |
| 1920 | 1,720 | 62.48% | 848 | 30.80% | 185 | 6.72% |
| 1924 | 827 | 45.74% | 337 | 18.64% | 644 | 35.62% |
| 1928 | 1,537 | 56.63% | 1,160 | 42.74% | 17 | 0.63% |
| 1932 | 1,063 | 33.64% | 1,977 | 62.56% | 120 | 3.80% |
| 1936 | 851 | 27.68% | 2,166 | 70.46% | 57 | 1.85% |
| 1940 | 1,165 | 35.02% | 2,129 | 63.99% | 33 | 0.99% |
| 1944 | 990 | 39.94% | 1,469 | 59.26% | 20 | 0.81% |
| 1948 | 997 | 36.28% | 1,669 | 60.74% | 82 | 2.98% |
| 1952 | 1,890 | 60.85% | 1,207 | 38.86% | 9 | 0.29% |
| 1956 | 1,460 | 50.38% | 1,438 | 49.62% | 0 | 0.00% |
| 1960 | 1,290 | 44.85% | 1,569 | 54.55% | 17 | 0.59% |
| 1964 | 961 | 35.55% | 1,742 | 64.45% | 0 | 0.00% |
| 1968 | 1,291 | 48.63% | 1,198 | 45.12% | 166 | 6.25% |
| 1972 | 1,513 | 54.44% | 1,151 | 41.42% | 115 | 4.14% |
| 1976 | 1,349 | 49.25% | 1,356 | 49.51% | 34 | 1.24% |
| 1980 | 1,686 | 56.29% | 1,107 | 36.96% | 202 | 6.74% |
| 1984 | 1,736 | 57.92% | 1,229 | 41.01% | 32 | 1.07% |
| 1988 | 1,402 | 48.15% | 1,460 | 50.14% | 50 | 1.72% |
| 1992 | 971 | 31.88% | 1,355 | 44.48% | 720 | 23.64% |
| 1996 | 1,127 | 38.96% | 1,316 | 45.49% | 450 | 15.55% |
| 2000 | 1,410 | 51.11% | 1,246 | 45.16% | 103 | 3.73% |
| 2004 | 1,424 | 51.45% | 1,300 | 46.97% | 44 | 1.59% |
| 2008 | 1,139 | 38.93% | 1,702 | 58.17% | 85 | 2.90% |
| 2012 | 1,178 | 41.20% | 1,616 | 56.52% | 65 | 2.27% |
| 2016 | 1,268 | 47.24% | 1,202 | 44.78% | 214 | 7.97% |
| 2020 | 1,469 | 47.11% | 1,589 | 50.96% | 60 | 1.92% |
| 2024 | 1,526 | 50.55% | 1,348 | 44.65% | 145 | 4.80% |

== Economy ==
The main industry in Blaine County is agriculture. The main employers on the Reservation are the Gros Ventre and Assiniboine tribes.

== Education ==
Aaniiih Nakoda College (formerly Fort Belknap College) is located on the Fort Belknap Indian Reservation.

There is one K-12 school district in the county, Hays-Lodge Pole K-12 Schools.

High school districts include:

- Chinook High School District
- Harlem High School District
- Turner High School District

Elementary school districts include:

- Bear Paw Elementary School District
- Cleveland Elementary School District
- Chinook Elementary School District
- Harlem Elementary School District
- North Harlem Colony Elementary School District
- Turner Elementary School District
- Zurich Elementary School District

Public high schools in the county include Harlem High School in Harlem, Chinook High School in Chinook, and Turner High School in Turner.

== Communities ==
=== Cities ===
- Chinook (county seat)
- Harlem

=== Census-designated places ===
- Fort Belknap Agency
- Hartland Colony
- Hays
- Hogeland
- Lodge Pole
- North Harlem Colony
- Turner
- Turner Colony
- Zurich

=== Unincorporated communities ===
- Cleveland
- Lloyd
- Lohman
- North Fork
- Rattlesnake
- Savoy

== See also ==
- List of lakes of Blaine County, Montana
- List of mountains in Blaine County, Montana
- National Register of Historic Places listings in Blaine County, Montana
