= Lloyd, Montana =

Unincorporated community in Montana, United States

- Unincorporated community
- Location within Montana Location within the United States
- Coordinates: 48°17′25″N 109°21′44″W
- Country: United States
- State: Montana
- County: Blaine
- Elevation: 3,881 ft (1,183 m)
- Time zone: UTC-7 (Mountain (MST))
  - Summer (DST): UTC-6 (MDT)
- Zip code: 59535
- Area code: 406
- GNIS feature ID: 773516

Lloyd is an unincorporated community in Blaine County, Montana, United States. Its ZIP code is 59535. It is located near the Bears Paw Mountains.

Named for an early prospector, “Old Man Lloyd”, the town achieved permanency when William Wilson established a post office and store in 1890.
