= 2024 United States presidential election in Montana =

- November 5, 2024
- Turnout: 76.57% (▼4.76 pp)

Nominee	Donald Trump	Kamala Harris
Party	Republican	Democratic
Home state	Florida	California
Running mate	JD Vance	Tim Walz
Electoral vote	4	0
Popular vote	352,079	231,906
Percentage	58.39%	38.46%

Trump
40–50%
50–60%
60–70%
70–80%
80–90%
90–100%
Harris
40–50%
50–60%
60–70%
70–80%
80–90%
90–100%
Tie/No Data
President before election
Joe Biden
Democratic
Elected President
Donald Trump
Republican

The 2024 United States presidential election in Montana took place on Tuesday, November 5, 2024, as part of the 2024 United States presidential election in which all 50 states plus the District of Columbia participated. Montana voters chose electors to represent them in the Electoral College via a popular vote. The state of Montana has four electoral votes in the Electoral College, following reapportionment due to the 2020 United States census in which the state gained a seat.

Trump once again won Montana, this time by 19.93%, an increase from his 16.37% margin of victory in 2020, but slightly under his 20.42% margin from 2016. Prior to the election, all major news organizations considered Montana a safe red state. Trump notably flipped Big Horn County (home of the Little Bighorn River and the famous battle that took place nearby it) which hadn't voted for the Republican candidate since Ronald Reagan won the county in 1980. He also flipped Blaine County, a county that has voted for the winning candidate in every U.S. presidential election since 1992.

== Primary elections ==
=== Democratic primary ===
The Montana Democratic primary was held on June 4, 2024, alongside primaries in the District of Columbia, New Jersey, New Mexico, and South Dakota.

Montana Democratic primary, June 4, 2024
Candidate	Votes	%	Delegates
Joe Biden (incumbent)	94,587	91.06	20
No preference	9,285	8.94	0
Total	103,872	100%	20

=== Republican primary ===
The Montana Republican primary was held on June 4, 2024, alongside primaries in the District of Columbia, New Jersey, New Mexico, and South Dakota.

Montana Republican primary, June 4, 2024
Candidate	Votes	Percentage	Actual delegate count		
Candidate	Votes	Percentage	Bound	Unbound	Total
Donald Trump	165,678	90.9%	31	0	31
No Preference	16,570	9.1%	0	0	0
Total:	182,248	100.00%	31	0	31

=== Green primary ===
The Montana Green primary was held on June 4, 2024, alongside primaries in the District of Columbia.

Montana Green primary, June 4, 2024
Candidate	Votes	Percentage	Delegates
No Preference	495	100.00%	4
Total:	495	100.00%	4

== General election ==
=== Candidates ===
The following presidential candidates have received ballot access in Montana:

- Kamala Harris, Democratic Party
- Donald Trump, Republican Party
- Chase Oliver, Libertarian Party
- Jill Stein, Green Party
- Robert F. Kennedy Jr., Independent (withdrawn)

=== Predictions ===
Source	Ranking	As of
Cook Political Report	Solid R	December 19, 2023
Inside Elections	Solid R	April 26, 2023
Sabato's Crystal Ball	Safe R	June 29, 2023
Decision Desk HQ/The Hill	Safe R	May 30, 2023
CNalysis	Solid R	December 30, 2023
CNN	Solid R	January 14, 2024
The Economist	Safe R	June 12, 2024
538	Solid R	September 23, 2024
RCP	Likely R	June 26, 2024
NBC News	Safe R	October 6, 2024

=== Polling ===
Donald Trump vs. Kamala Harris

Poll source	Date(s) administered	Sample size (Note: Key: A – all adults RV – registered voters LV – likely voters V – unclear)	Margin of error	Donald Trump Republican	Kamala Harris Democratic	Other / Undecided
AtlasIntel	November 3–4, 2024	752 (LV)	± 4.0%	59%	39%	2%
Emerson College (Note: Poll sponsored by Nexstar Media Group)	October 23–25, 2024	1,000 (LV)	± 3.0%	58%	39%	3% (Note: "Someone else" with 2%)
Emerson College	October 23–25, 2024	1,000 (LV)	± 3.0%	59% (Note: With voters who lean towards a given candidate)	40%	1%
New York Times/Siena College	October 5–8, 2024	656 (RV)	± 4.0%	57%	39%	4%
New York Times/Siena College	October 5–8, 2024	656 (LV)	± 4.0%	57%	40%	3%
RMG Research (Note: Poll sponsored by the Napolitan Institute)	September 12–19, 2024	491 (LV)	± 4.4%	59%	38%	3% (Note: "Some other candidate" with 1%)
Fabrizio Ward (R)/ David Binder Research (D) (Note: Poll commissioned by AARP)	August 25–29, 2024	600 (LV)	± 4.0%	56%	41%	3%
	August 23, 2024	Robert F. Kennedy Jr. suspends his presidential campaign and endorses Donald Trump.				
	August 22, 2024	Democratic National Convention concludes				
Rasmussen Reports (R) (Note: Poll sponsored by NumbersUSA)	August 13–20, 2024	835 (LV)	± 3.0%	58%	35%	7%
	August 19, 2024	Democratic National Convention begins				
Emerson College	August 5–6, 2024	1,000 (RV)	3.0%	55%	40%	5%
Emerson College	August 5–6, 2024	1,000 (RV)	3.0%	58%	43%	–

Donald Trump vs. Kamala Harris vs. Cornel West vs. Jill Stein vs. Chase Oliver

Poll source	Date(s) administered	Sample size	Margin of error	Donald Trump Republican	Kamala Harris Democratic	Cornel West Independent	Jill Stein Green	Chase Oliver Libertarian	Other / Undecided
AtlasIntel	November 3–4, 2024	752 (LV)	± 4.0%	57%	37%	–	2%	0%	4% (Note: "Other" with 3%)
New York Times/Siena College	October 5–8, 2024	656 (RV)	± 4.0%	56%	38%	–	0%	0%	6%
New York Times/Siena College	October 5–8, 2024	656 (LV)	± 4.0%	56%	39%	–	0%	0%	5%
Remington Research Group (R) (Note: Poll sponsored by American Fuel & Petrochemical Manufacturers, a group that supports Republican candidates)	September 16–20, 2024	800 (LV)	± 3.5%	56%	39%	–	2%	–	3%

Donald Trump vs. Kamala Harris vs. Robert F. Kennedy Jr. vs. Cornel West vs. Jill Stein vs. Chase Oliver

Poll source	Date(s) administered	Sample size	Margin of error	Donald Trump Republican	Kamala Harris Democratic	Robert F. Kennedy Jr. Independent	Cornel West Independent	Jill Stein Green	Chase Oliver Libertarian	Other / Undecided
Montana State University Billings	September 30 – October 16, 2024	760 (A)	± 3.6%	52%	34%	3%	–	1%	2%	8%
Rasmussen Reports (R)	August 13–20, 2024	835 (LV)	± 3.0%	58%	31%	7%	0%	0%	0%	4%
American Pulse Research & Polling (Note: Poll sponsored by KULR-TV)	August 10–12, 2024	538 (LV)	± 4.2%	52%	38%	6%	0%	0%	2%	8%
Emerson College	August 5–6, 2024	1,000 (RV)	± 3.0%	54%	39%	5%	0%	0%	0%	2%

Donald Trump vs. Kamala Harris vs. Robert F. Kennedy Jr.

Poll source	Date(s) administered	Sample size	Margin of error	Donald Trump Republican	Kamala Harris Democratic	Robert F. Kennedy Jr. Independent	Other / Undecided
RMG Research	August 6–14, 2024	540 (RV)	± 4.2%	57%	39%	2%	2%

Hypothetical polling with Donald Trump and Joe Biden

Donald Trump vs. Joe Biden

Poll source	Date(s) administered	Sample size	Margin of error	Donald Trump Republican	Joe Biden Democratic	Other / Undecided
Torchlight Strategies (R) (Note: Poll commissioned by Common Sense for America PAC, which supports Republican candidates)	June 22–26, 2024	649 (RV)	± 3.9%	51%	35%	14% (Note: "Someone else" with 7%)
Public Opinion Strategies (R) (Note: Poll sponsored by the Montana Republican Party)	June 11–13, 2024	500 (LV)	± 4.4%	57%	37%	6%
Fabrizio, Lee & Associates (R) (Note: Poll conducted by More Jobs, Less Government which supports Republican candidates)	June 3–5, 2024	500 (LV)	± 4.4%	54%	36%	10%
John Zogby Strategies (Note: Poll conducted for Kennedy's campaign)	April 13–21, 2024	301 (LV)	–	59%	34%	7%
Emerson College	February 26 – March 2, 2024	1,000 (RV)	± 3.0%	56%	35%	9%
SurveyUSA	February 12–15, 2024	549 (LV)	± 4.5%	51%	29%	20%
Emerson College	October 1–4, 2023	447 (RV)	± 4.6%	49%	28%	23%
Change Research (D)/Future Majority (D)	September 16–19, 2023	1,451 (RV)	–	54%	37%	9%
J.L. Partners	August 12–17, 2023	741 (LV)	–	51%	39%	10%
Echelon Insights	August 31 – September 7, 2022	320 (LV)	± 6.6%	49%	36%	15%

Donald Trump vs. Joe Biden vs. Robert F. Kennedy Jr. vs. Cornel West vs. Jill Stein

Poll source	Date(s) administered	Sample size	Margin of error	Donald Trump Republican	Joe Biden Democratic	Robert F. Kennedy Jr. Independent	Cornel West Independent	Jill Stein Green	Other / Undecided
Emerson College	February 26 – March 2, 2024	1,000 (RV)	± 3.0%	49%	28%	8%	1%	1%	13%

Donald Trump vs. Joe Biden vs. Cornel West

Poll source	Date(s) administered	Sample size	Margin of error	Donald Trump Republican	Joe Biden Democratic	Cornel West Independent	Other / Undecided
Change Research (D)/Future Majority (D)	September 16–19, 2023	1,451 (RV)	–	51%	30%	7%	12%
Change Research (D)/Future Majority (D)	September 16–19, 2023	1,451 (RV)	–	49%	28%	4%	19% (Note: Joe Manchin with 6%)

Hypothetical polling with other candidates

Donald Trump vs. Robert F. Kennedy Jr.

Poll source	Date(s) administered	Sample size	Margin of error	Donald Trump Republican	Robert Kennedy Jr. Independent	Other / Undecided
John Zogby Strategies	April 13–21, 2024	301 (LV)	–	50%	35%	15%

Robert F. Kennedy Jr. vs. Joe Biden

Poll source	Date(s) administered	Sample size	Margin of error	Robert Kennedy Jr. Independent	Joe Biden Democratic	Other / Undecided
John Zogby Strategies	April 13–21, 2024	301 (LV)	–	58%	30%	12%

Ron DeSantis vs. Joe Biden

Poll source	Date(s) administered	Sample size	Margin of error	Ron DeSantis Republican	Joe Biden Democratic	Other / Undecided
J.L. Partners	August 12–17, 2023	741 (LV)	–	50%	36%	14%
Echelon Insights	August 31 – September 7, 2022	320 (LV)	± 6.6%	42%	35%	23%

=== Results ===
State House district results: Trump 40–50% 50–60% 60–70% 70–80% 80–90% / Harris 40–50% 50–60% 60–70%

2024 United States presidential election in Montana
Party	Candidate	Votes	%	±%
Republican	Donald Trump; JD Vance	352,079	58.39%	+1.47%
Democratic	Kamala Harris; Tim Walz	231,906	38.46%	−2.09%
We the People	Robert F. Kennedy Jr. (withdrawn); Nicole Shanahan (withdrawn)	11,825	1.96%	N/A
Libertarian	Chase Oliver; Mike ter Maat	4,275	0.71%	−1.82%
Green	Jill Stein; Butch Ware	2,878	0.48%	N/A
Independent	Shiva Ayyadurai (write-in); Crystal Ellis (write-in)	21	0.00%	N/A
Write-in		6	0.00%	−0.01%
Total votes		602,990	100.00%	N/A

==== By county ====
County	Donald Trump Republican		Kamala Harris Democratic		Various candidates Other parties		Margin		Total
County	#	%	#	%	#	%	#	%	Total
Beaverhead	4,058	70.04%	1,543	26.63%	193	3.33%	2,515	43.41%	5,794
Big Horn	2,188	48.95%	2,112	47.25%	170	3.80%	76	1.70%	4,470
Blaine	1,526	50.55%	1,348	44.65%	145	4.80%	178	5.90%	3,019
Broadwater	3,770	78.38%	885	18.40%	155	3.22%	2,885	59.98%	4,810
Carbon	4,719	64.67%	2,353	32.25%	225	3.08%	2,366	32.42%	7,297
Carter	760	88.99%	75	8.78%	19	2.22%	685	80.21%	854
Cascade	22,419	59.65%	14,021	37.31%	1,143	3.04%	8,398	22.35%	37,583
Chouteau	1,885	64.25%	940	32.04%	109	3.72%	945	32.21%	2,934
Custer	4,208	72.46%	1,385	23.85%	214	3.69%	2,823	48.61%	5,807
Daniels	778	81.81%	154	16.19%	19	2.00%	624	65.62%	951
Dawson	3,627	78.20%	894	19.28%	117	2.52%	2,733	58.93%	4,638
Deer Lodge	2,329	47.82%	2,376	48.79%	165	3.39%	-47	-0.97%	4,870
Fallon	1,303	86.46%	163	10.82%	41	2.72%	1,140	75.65%	1,507
Fergus	4,965	73.97%	1,522	22.68%	225	3.35%	3,443	51.30%	6,712
Flathead	41,390	65.55%	20,062	31.77%	1,689	2.67%	21,328	33.78%	63,141
Gallatin	32,695	46.77%	34,938	49.98%	2,267	3.24%	-2,243	-3.21%	69,900
Garfield	756	94.50%	39	4.88%	5	0.63%	717	89.63%	800
Glacier	1,939	38.18%	2,933	57.76%	206	4.06%	-994	-19.57%	5,078
Golden Valley	440	85.44%	67	13.01%	8	1.55%	373	72.43%	515
Granite	1,537	70.63%	579	26.61%	60	2.76%	958	44.03%	2,176
Hill	3,871	56.89%	2,634	38.71%	299	4.39%	1,237	18.18%	6,804
Jefferson	5,544	66.85%	2,516	30.34%	233	2.81%	3,028	36.51%	8,293
Judith Basin	1,051	77.68%	265	19.59%	37	2.73%	786	58.09%	1,353
Lake	9,880	58.42%	6,510	38.50%	521	3.08%	3,370	19.93%	16,911
Lewis and Clark	21,479	51.11%	19,085	45.41%	1,461	3.48%	2,394	5.70%	42,025
Liberty	752	76.11%	214	21.66%	22	2.23%	538	54.45%	988
Lincoln	8,909	75.57%	2,615	22.18%	265	2.25%	6,294	53.39%	11,789
Madison	4,615	71.42%	1,689	26.14%	158	2.45%	2,926	45.28%	6,462
McCone	931	86.04%	129	11.92%	22	2.03%	802	74.12%	1,082
Meagher	888	75.77%	256	21.84%	28	2.39%	632	53.92%	1,172
Mineral	2,049	72.33%	689	24.32%	95	3.35%	1,360	48.01%	2,833
Missoula	27,306	37.52%	42,903	58.95%	2,564	3.52%	-15,597	-21.43%	72,773
Musselshell	2,550	84.66%	396	13.15%	66	2.19%	2,154	71.51%	3,012
Park	6,128	52.30%	5,224	44.58%	365	3.12%	904	7.72%	11,717
Petroleum	284	87.65%	37	11.42%	3	0.93%	247	76.23%	324
Phillips	1,753	80.08%	385	17.59%	51	2.33%	1,368	62.49%	2,189
Pondera	1,972	69.14%	782	27.42%	98	3.44%	1,190	41.73%	2,852
Powder River	963	87.07%	131	11.84%	12	1.08%	832	75.23%	1,106
Powell	2,466	75.14%	710	21.63%	106	3.23%	1,756	53.50%	3,282
Prairie	546	79.25%	122	17.71%	21	3.05%	424	61.54%	689
Ravalli	20,617	68.94%	8,485	28.37%	803	2.69%	12,132	40.57%	29,905
Richland	4,387	82.63%	778	14.65%	144	2.71%	3,609	67.98%	5,309
Roosevelt	2,055	52.50%	1,680	42.92%	179	4.57%	375	9.58%	3,914
Rosebud	2,466	66.77%	1,095	29.65%	132	3.57%	1,371	37.12%	3,693
Sanders	6,150	76.19%	1,705	21.12%	217	2.69%	4,445	55.07%	8,072
Sheridan	1,321	69.09%	509	26.62%	82	4.29%	812	42.47%	1,912
Silver Bow	8,110	44.50%	9,386	51.50%	730	4.01%	-1,276	-7.00%	18,226
Stillwater	4,699	79.56%	1,056	17.88%	151	2.56%	3,643	61.68%	5,906
Sweet Grass	1,789	75.14%	525	22.05%	67	2.81%	1,264	53.09%	2,381
Teton	2,533	70.99%	927	25.98%	108	3.03%	1,606	45.01%	3,568
Toole	1,571	76.78%	415	20.28%	60	2.93%	1,156	56.50%	2,046
Treasure	367	83.03%	57	12.90%	18	4.07%	310	70.14%	442
Valley	3,019	74.01%	935	22.92%	125	3.06%	2,084	51.09%	4,079
Wheatland	843	77.62%	209	19.24%	34	3.13%	634	58.38%	1,086
Wibaux	463	84.80%	71	13.00%	12	2.20%	392	71.79%	546
Yellowstone	50,460	62.00%	28,392	34.88%	2,541	3.12%	22,068	27.11%	81,393
Totals	352,079	58.39%	231,906	38.46%	19,005	3.15%	120,173	19.93%	602,990

==== Counties that flipped from Democratic to Republican ====
- Big Horn (largest city: Hardin)
- Blaine (largest city: Chinook)

==== By congressional district ====
Trump won both congressional districts.

District	Trump	Harris	Representative
1st	54.22%	42.66%	Ryan Zinke
2nd	63.18%	33.64%	Matt Rosendale (118th Congress)
2nd	63.18%	33.64%	Troy Downing (119th Congress)

== Analysis ==
Although somewhat less conservative than its neighboring states, Montana – a sparsely populated state in the Northern Rockies and Great Plains – has not been won by a Democratic presidential candidate since Bill Clinton narrowly did so in 1992, neither has it been competitive at the presidential level since Democrat Barack Obama came up less than 3 points shy of carrying the state in 2008. With the exception of 2008, the state has been carried by Republican presidential candidates by double digits since 2000.

However, despite the state's strong Republican lean, Montana received significant attention from both parties due to the simultaneous U.S. Senate race between incumbent Democrat Jon Tester and Republican challenger Tim Sheehy, which was seen as competitive but favoring Sheehy, who ended up winning by over seven points. Trump's victory is seen to have helped Sheehy win via the coattail effect, thus flipping Montana's last remaining Democratic statewide office into the Republican column.

Trump gained nearly everywhere in the state but especially in counties with high Native American populations, such as Big Horn County, Glacier County, and Blaine County; he was the first Republican presidential candidate to win Big Horn since Ronald Reagan in 1980. In addition, his 9.6% margin of victory in Roosevelt County is the best for a presidential Republican since Reagan's 10.5% in 1984; the historically-Democratic county, home to much of the Fort Peck Reservation, has voted for Trump in all three of his election bids. With Clallam County, Washington voting for Harris, Blaine County now holds the longest active bellwether streak in the nation, having last voted for a losing presidential candidate in 1988, its only miss outside of its inaugural election in 1912. Trump also came within just 47 votes of winning Deer Lodge County, thus giving the best performance for a Republican there since Calvin Coolidge last won the county in 1924.

== See also ==
- United States presidential elections in Montana
- 2024 United States presidential election
- 2024 Democratic Party presidential primaries
- 2024 Republican Party presidential primaries
- 2024 United States elections

== Notes ==
Partisan clients
