= 1964 United States presidential election in Montana =

- November 3, 1964

Nominee	Lyndon B. Johnson	Barry Goldwater
Party	Democratic	Republican
Home state	Texas	Arizona
Running mate	Hubert Humphrey	William E. Miller
Electoral vote	4	0
Popular vote	164,246	113,032
Percentage	58.95%	40.57%
County results
Johnson
50–60%
60–70%
70–80%
Goldwater
40–50%
50–60%
President before election
Lyndon B. Johnson
Democratic
Elected President
Lyndon B. Johnson
Democratic

The 1964 United States presidential election in Montana took place on November 3, 1964, and was part of the 1964 United States presidential election. Voters chose four representatives, or electors to the Electoral College, who voted for president and vice president.

Montana resoundingly voted for the Democratic nominee, President Lyndon B. Johnson, over the Republican nominee, Senator Barry Goldwater. Johnson won Montana by a large margin of 18.38%. This is the last presidential election where a Democrat won Montana by a majority of the popular vote (Bill Clinton would win the state by a plurality in 1992).

As of the 2024 presidential election, this is the last election in which the following counties have voted for a Democratic presidential candidate: Yellowstone, Flathead, Ravalli, Park, Custer, Richland, Fergus, Granite, Powell, Teton, Carbon, Chouteau, Wheatland, Judith Basin, Pondera, Golden Valley, Toole, Liberty, Treasure, Musselshell, Phillips, Daniels, and Petroleum.

== Results ==
1964 United States presidential election in Montana
Party	Candidate	Votes	Percentage	Electoral votes
Democratic	Lyndon B. Johnson (incumbent)	164,246	58.95%	4
Republican	Barry Goldwater	113,032	40.57%	0
States' Rights	John Kasper	519	0.19%	0
Prohibition	E. Harold Munn	499	0.18%	0
Militant Workers	Clifton DeBerry	332	0.12%	0
Totals		278,628	100.00%	4

=== Results by county ===
County	Lyndon B. Johnson Democratic		Barry Goldwater Republican		Various candidates Other parties		Margin		Total votes cast
County	#	%	#	%	#	%	#	%	Total votes cast
Beaverhead	1,469	45.47%	1,754	54.29%	8	0.25%	-285	-8.82%	3,231
Big Horn	2,509	62.83%	1,481	37.09%	3	0.08%	1,028	25.74%	3,993
Blaine	1,742	64.45%	961	35.55%	0	0.00%	781	28.90%	2,703
Broadwater	595	49.42%	609	50.58%	0	0.00%	-14	-1.16%	1,204
Carbon	2,098	57.75%	1,535	42.25%	0	0.00%	563	15.50%	3,633
Carter	453	44.02%	576	55.98%	0	0.00%	-123	-11.96%	1,029
Cascade	17,609	65.92%	8,986	33.64%	119	0.45%	8,623	32.28%	26,714
Chouteau	1,827	55.77%	1,444	44.08%	5	0.15%	383	11.69%	3,276
Custer	2,790	54.70%	2,302	45.13%	9	0.18%	488	9.57%	5,101
Daniels	987	57.05%	742	42.89%	1	0.06%	245	14.16%	1,730
Dawson	2,691	58.03%	1,938	41.79%	8	0.17%	753	16.24%	4,637
Deer Lodge	4,835	77.25%	1,415	22.61%	9	0.14%	3,420	54.64%	6,259
Fallon	765	47.96%	827	51.85%	3	0.19%	-62	-3.89%	1,595
Fergus	3,300	52.44%	2,980	47.35%	13	0.21%	320	5.09%	6,293
Flathead	8,015	55.78%	6,325	44.02%	30	0.21%	1,690	11.76%	14,370
Gallatin	5,600	49.79%	5,621	49.97%	27	0.24%	-21	-0.18%	11,248
Garfield	384	42.86%	509	56.81%	3	0.33%	-125	-13.95%	896
Glacier	2,218	59.99%	1,458	39.44%	21	0.57%	760	20.55%	3,697
Golden Valley	352	58.28%	252	41.72%	0	0.00%	100	16.56%	604
Granite	658	55.43%	527	44.40%	2	0.17%	131	11.03%	1,187
Hill	4,491	68.00%	2,101	31.81%	12	0.18%	2,390	36.19%	6,604
Jefferson	967	59.29%	662	40.59%	2	0.12%	305	18.70%	1,631
Judith Basin	822	54.73%	678	45.14%	2	0.13%	144	9.59%	1,502
Lake	3,148	52.59%	2,828	47.24%	10	0.17%	320	5.35%	5,986
Lewis and Clark	7,506	54.84%	6,155	44.97%	26	0.19%	1,351	9.87%	13,687
Liberty	619	53.59%	533	46.15%	3	0.26%	86	7.44%	1,155
Lincoln	3,140	66.68%	1,554	33.00%	15	0.32%	1,586	33.68%	4,709
McCone	891	59.12%	615	40.81%	1	0.07%	276	18.31%	1,507
Madison	1,125	46.82%	1,276	53.10%	2	0.08%	-151	-6.28%	2,403
Meagher	405	44.36%	506	55.42%	2	0.22%	-101	-11.06%	913
Mineral	901	70.72%	368	28.89%	5	0.39%	533	41.83%	1,274
Missoula	12,900	61.42%	8,065	38.40%	39	0.19%	4,835	23.02%	21,004
Musselshell	1,189	59.10%	823	40.90%	0	0.00%	366	18.20%	2,012
Park	2,824	51.79%	2,619	48.03%	10	0.18%	205	3.76%	5,453
Petroleum	210	52.37%	190	47.38%	1	0.25%	20	4.99%	401
Phillips	1,612	56.42%	1,242	43.47%	3	0.11%	370	12.95%	2,857
Pondera	1,759	61.14%	1,110	38.58%	8	0.28%	649	22.56%	2,877
Powder River	449	40.86%	649	59.05%	1	0.09%	-200	-18.19%	1,099
Powell	1,896	62.37%	1,140	37.50%	4	0.13%	756	24.87%	3,040
Prairie	488	46.56%	555	52.96%	5	0.48%	-67	-6.40%	1,048
Ravalli	3,300	58.28%	2,350	41.50%	12	0.21%	950	16.78%	5,662
Richland	2,320	56.16%	1,784	43.19%	27	0.65%	536	12.97%	4,131
Roosevelt	2,463	60.40%	1,612	39.53%	3	0.07%	851	20.87%	4,078
Rosebud	1,212	52.22%	1,105	47.61%	4	0.17%	107	4.61%	2,321
Sanders	1,836	60.94%	1,163	38.60%	14	0.46%	673	22.34%	3,013
Sheridan	1,905	69.17%	837	30.39%	12	0.44%	1,068	38.78%	2,754
Silver Bow	15,751	74.16%	4,873	22.94%	615	2.90%	10,878	51.22%	21,239
Stillwater	1,130	49.76%	1,140	50.20%	1	0.04%	-10	-0.44%	2,271
Sweet Grass	653	43.13%	856	56.54%	5	0.33%	-203	-13.41%	1,514
Teton	1,808	56.52%	1,388	43.39%	3	0.09%	420	13.13%	3,199
Toole	1,649	57.38%	1,223	42.55%	2	0.07%	426	14.83%	2,874
Treasure	285	53.17%	251	46.83%	0	0.00%	34	6.34%	536
Valley	3,032	59.16%	2,077	40.53%	16	0.31%	955	18.63%	5,125
Wheatland	790	57.54%	583	42.46%	0	0.00%	207	15.08%	1,373
Wibaux	427	57.94%	308	41.79%	2	0.27%	119	16.15%	737
Yellowstone	17,446	52.49%	15,571	46.85%	222	0.67%	1,875	5.64%	33,239
Totals	164,246	58.95%	113,032	40.57%	1,350	0.48%	51,214	18.38%	278,628

==== Counties that flipped from Republican to Democratic ====
- Big Horn
- Carbon
- Custer
- Dawson
- Fergus
- Flathead
- Golden Valley
- Granite
- Jefferson
- Lake
- Liberty
- Lewis and Clark
- Missoula
- Musselshell
- Park
- Petroleum
- Phillips
- Ravalli
- Richland
- Rosebud
- Sanders
- Treasure
- Wheatland
- Yellowstone

== See also ==
- United States presidential elections in Montana
