= 1980 United States presidential election in Montana =

- November 4, 1980

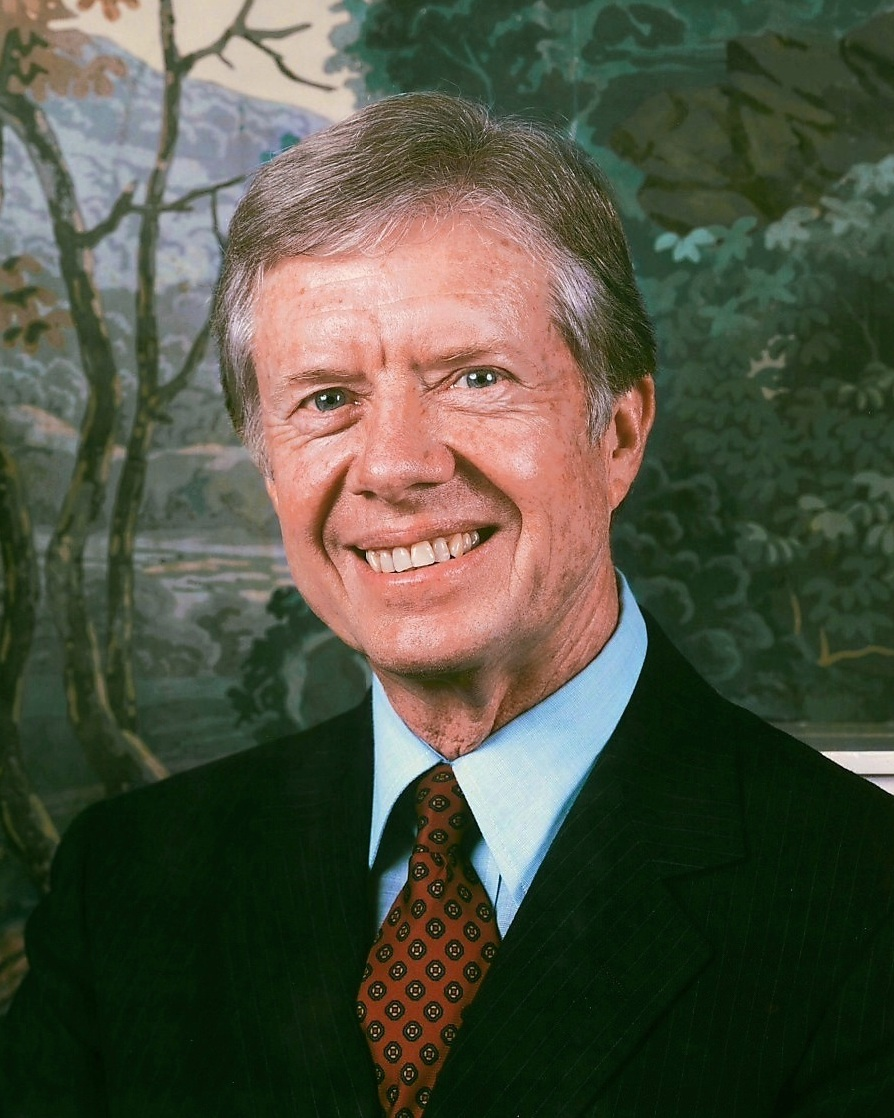

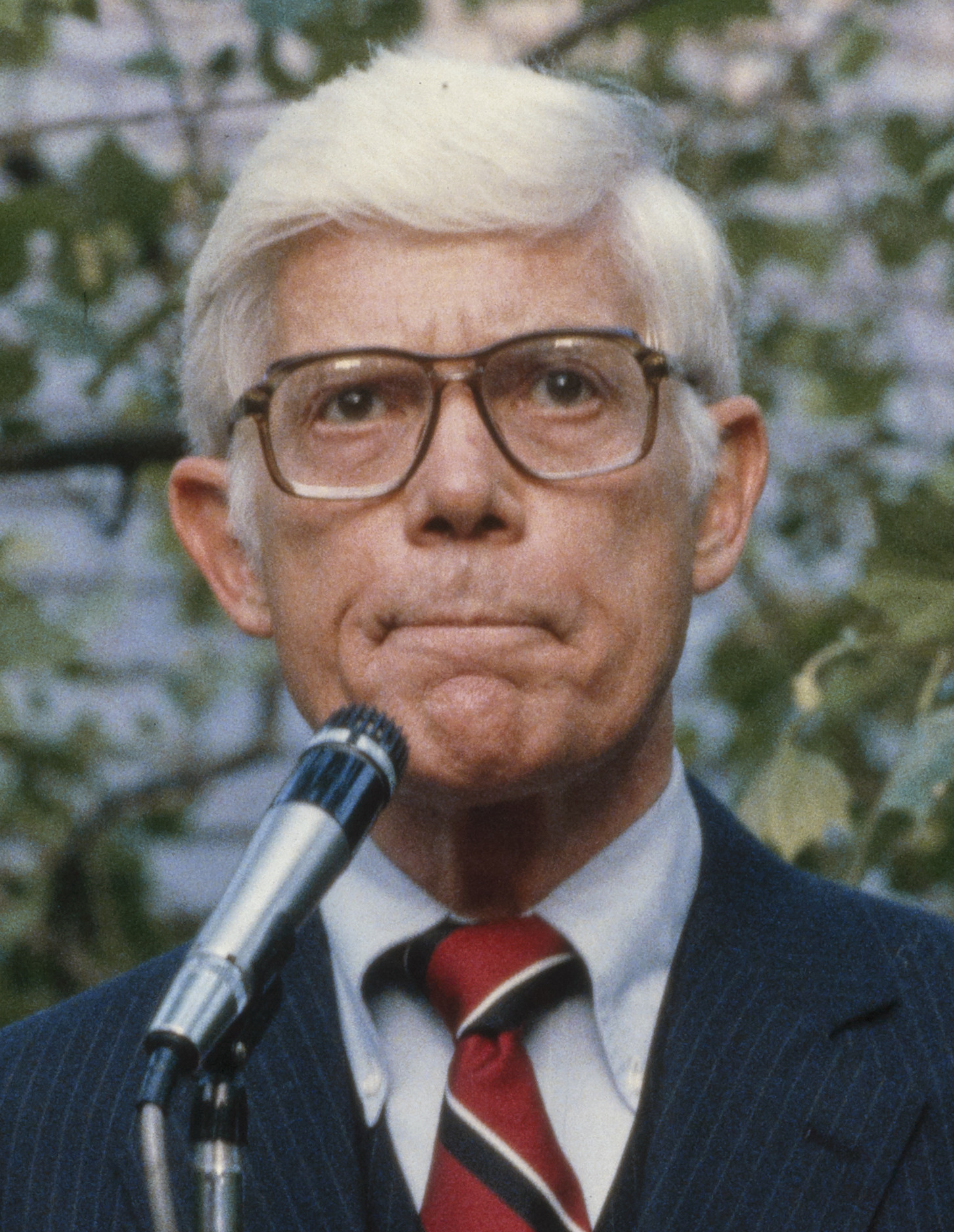
Nominee	Ronald Reagan	Jimmy Carter	John B. Anderson
Party	Republican	Democratic	Independent
Home state	California	Georgia	Illinois
Running mate	George H. W. Bush	Walter Mondale	Patrick Lucey
Electoral vote	4	0	0
Popular vote	206,814	118,032	29,281
Percentage	56.82%	32.43%	8.05%
County results
Reagan
40–50%
50–60%
60–70%
70–80%
Carter
50–60%
President before election
Jimmy Carter
Democratic
Elected President
Ronald Reagan
Republican

The 1980 United States presidential election in Montana took place on November 4, 1980, and was part of the 1980 United States presidential election. Voters chose four representatives, or electors to the Electoral College, who voted for president and vice president.

Montana overwhelmingly voted for the Republican nominee, Governor Ronald Reagan, over the Democratic nominee, President Jimmy Carter. Reagan won Montana by a landslide margin of 24.39%. This was the last presidential election until 2024 in which Big Horn County voted for the Republican candidate.

== Results ==
1980 United States presidential election in Montana
Party	Candidate	Votes	Percentage	Electoral votes
Republican	Ronald Reagan	206,814	56.82%	4
Democratic	Jimmy Carter (incumbent)	118,032	32.43%	0
Independent	John B. Anderson	29,281	8.05%	0
Libertarian	Ed Clark	9,825	2.70%	0
Totals		363,952	100.00%	4

=== Results by county ===
County	Ronald Reagan Republican		Jimmy Carter Democratic		John B. Anderson Independent		Ed Clark Libertarian		Margin		Total votes cast
County	#	%	#	%	#	%	#	%	#	%	Total votes cast
Beaverhead	2,955	72.02%	842	20.52%	205	5.00%	101	2.46%	2,113	51.50%	4,103
Big Horn	1,730	46.32%	1,644	44.02%	308	8.25%	53	1.42%	86	2.30%	3,735
Blaine	1,686	56.29%	1,107	36.96%	163	5.44%	39	1.30%	579	19.33%	2,995
Broadwater	1,052	67.26%	401	25.64%	69	4.41%	42	2.69%	651	41.62%	1,564
Carbon	2,471	56.64%	1,468	33.65%	331	7.59%	93	2.13%	1,003	22.99%	4,363
Carter	766	72.40%	237	22.40%	37	3.50%	18	1.70%	529	50.00%	1,058
Cascade	17,664	54.80%	11,105	34.45%	2,655	8.24%	810	2.51%	6,559	20.35%	32,234
Chouteau	2,448	68.32%	853	23.81%	216	6.03%	66	1.84%	1,595	44.51%	3,583
Custer	3,533	60.75%	1,822	31.33%	369	6.34%	92	1.58%	1,711	29.42%	5,816
Daniels	1,086	65.19%	483	28.99%	77	4.62%	20	1.20%	603	36.20%	1,666
Dawson	3,045	59.50%	1,543	30.15%	424	8.28%	106	2.07%	1,502	29.35%	5,118
Deer Lodge	1,905	33.79%	3,077	54.58%	474	8.41%	182	3.23%	-1,172	-20.79%	5,638
Fallon	1,286	66.98%	512	26.67%	94	4.90%	28	1.46%	774	40.31%	1,920
Fergus	4,455	65.02%	1,840	26.85%	388	5.66%	169	2.47%	2,615	38.17%	6,852
Flathead	15,102	63.54%	6,349	26.71%	1,621	6.82%	695	2.92%	8,753	36.83%	23,767
Gallatin	12,738	58.63%	5,747	26.45%	2,432	11.19%	809	3.72%	6,991	32.18%	21,726
Garfield	760	78.03%	169	17.35%	29	2.98%	16	1.64%	591	60.68%	974
Glacier	2,283	55.78%	1,394	34.06%	297	7.26%	119	2.91%	889	21.72%	4,093
Golden Valley	362	65.11%	155	27.88%	28	5.04%	11	1.98%	207	37.23%	556
Granite	811	59.15%	439	32.02%	76	5.54%	45	3.28%	372	27.13%	1,371
Hill	4,448	54.99%	2,875	35.54%	604	7.47%	162	2.00%	1,573	19.45%	8,089
Jefferson	1,841	57.12%	1,055	32.73%	216	6.70%	111	3.44%	786	24.39%	3,223
Judith Basin	1,030	63.31%	480	29.50%	93	5.72%	24	1.48%	550	33.81%	1,627
Lake	5,083	59.58%	2,615	30.65%	573	6.72%	261	3.06%	2,468	28.93%	8,532
Lewis and Clark	12,128	57.18%	6,815	32.13%	1,793	8.45%	476	2.24%	5,313	25.05%	21,212
Liberty	872	69.43%	283	22.53%	71	5.65%	30	2.39%	589	46.90%	1,256
Lincoln	4,202	57.19%	2,422	32.96%	485	6.60%	239	3.25%	1,780	24.23%	7,348
McCone	1,000	67.98%	349	23.73%	86	5.85%	36	2.45%	651	44.25%	1,471
Madison	2,220	70.59%	676	21.49%	174	5.53%	75	2.38%	1,544	49.10%	3,145
Meagher	689	69.60%	247	24.95%	41	4.14%	13	1.31%	442	44.65%	990
Mineral	800	48.28%	660	39.83%	138	8.33%	59	3.56%	140	8.45%	1,657
Missoula	16,161	46.72%	13,115	37.91%	3,847	11.12%	1,471	4.25%	3,046	8.81%	34,594
Musselshell	1,279	58.03%	784	35.57%	106	4.81%	35	1.59%	495	22.46%	2,204
Park	3,929	63.42%	1,663	26.84%	459	7.41%	144	2.32%	2,266	36.58%	6,195
Petroleum	225	65.98%	90	26.39%	15	4.40%	11	3.23%	135	39.59%	341
Phillips	1,723	64.95%	745	28.08%	146	5.50%	39	1.47%	978	36.87%	2,653
Pondera	2,270	66.14%	897	26.14%	207	6.03%	58	1.69%	1,373	40.00%	3,432
Powder River	985	68.26%	336	23.28%	94	6.51%	28	1.94%	649	44.98%	1,443
Powell	1,770	59.14%	883	29.50%	198	6.62%	142	4.74%	887	29.64%	2,993
Prairie	580	62.57%	283	30.53%	57	6.15%	7	0.76%	297	32.04%	927
Ravalli	7,268	63.73%	3,063	26.86%	743	6.52%	330	2.89%	4,205	36.87%	11,404
Richland	3,348	66.45%	1,252	24.85%	343	6.81%	95	1.89%	2,096	41.60%	5,038
Roosevelt	2,298	55.24%	1,504	36.15%	304	7.31%	54	1.30%	794	19.09%	4,160
Rosebud	1,875	54.46%	1,167	33.89%	265	7.70%	136	3.95%	708	20.57%	3,443
Sanders	2,194	54.86%	1,395	34.88%	291	7.28%	119	2.98%	799	19.98%	3,999
Sheridan	1,658	56.94%	955	32.80%	247	8.48%	52	1.79%	703	24.14%	2,912
Silver Bow	7,301	37.68%	9,721	50.17%	1,752	9.04%	603	3.11%	-2,420	-12.49%	19,377
Stillwater	1,828	61.26%	919	30.80%	181	6.07%	56	1.88%	909	30.46%	2,984
Sweet Grass	1,169	67.22%	440	25.30%	98	5.64%	32	1.84%	729	41.92%	1,739
Teton	2,415	67.76%	902	25.31%	186	5.22%	61	1.71%	1,513	42.45%	3,564
Toole	2,000	70.18%	634	22.25%	154	5.40%	62	2.18%	1,366	47.93%	2,850
Treasure	321	57.94%	181	32.67%	34	6.14%	18	3.25%	140	25.27%	554
Valley	3,242	62.47%	1,567	30.19%	264	5.09%	117	2.25%	1,675	32.28%	5,190
Wheatland	742	60.33%	381	30.98%	88	7.15%	19	1.54%	361	29.35%	1,230
Wibaux	450	61.56%	219	29.96%	45	6.16%	17	2.33%	231	31.60%	731
Yellowstone	27,332	56.57%	15,272	31.61%	4,590	9.50%	1,119	2.32%	12,060	24.96%	48,313
Totals	206,814	56.82%	118,032	32.43%	29,281	8.05%	9,825	2.70%	88,782	24.39%	363,952

==== Counties that flipped from Democratic to Republican ====
- Big Horn
- Blaine
- Hill
- Lincoln
- McCone
- Mineral
- Roosevelt
- Sheridan
- Wibaux

== See also ==
- United States presidential elections in Montana
- Presidency of Ronald Reagan
