= Ken Hansen =

American politician (1951–2023)

Member of the Montana Senate from the 17th district
- In office 2002–2010
- Succeeded by: Rowlie Hutton

Personal details
- Born: October 15, 1951 Havre, Montana, U.S.
- Died: June 10, 2023 (aged 71)
- Party: Democratic Party
- Spouse: Renee
- Occupation: Farmer, politician

Ken "Kim" Hansen (October 15, 1951 – June 10, 2023) was a Democratic Party member of the Montana Senate who represented District 17 from 2003 to 2010. He later served as the mayor of Harlem, Montana from 2017 until his death in 2023.

Hansen died June 10, 2023, at the age of 71.
