= 1912 United States presidential election in Montana =

- November 5, 1912

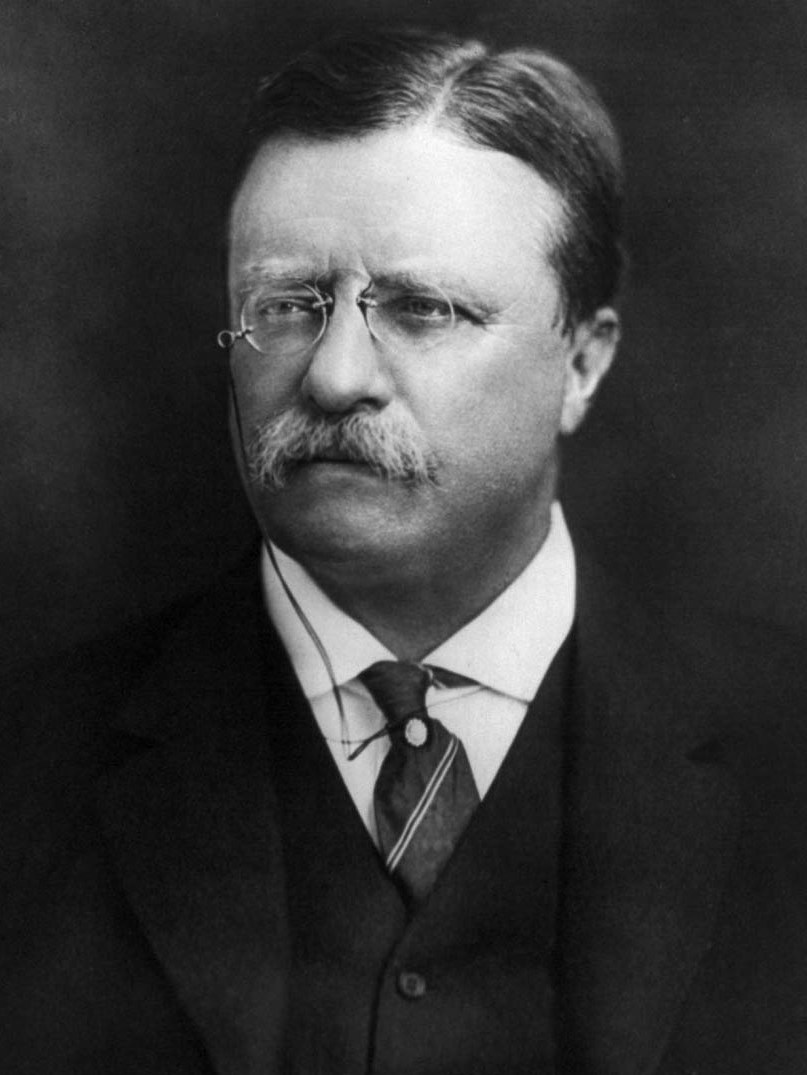

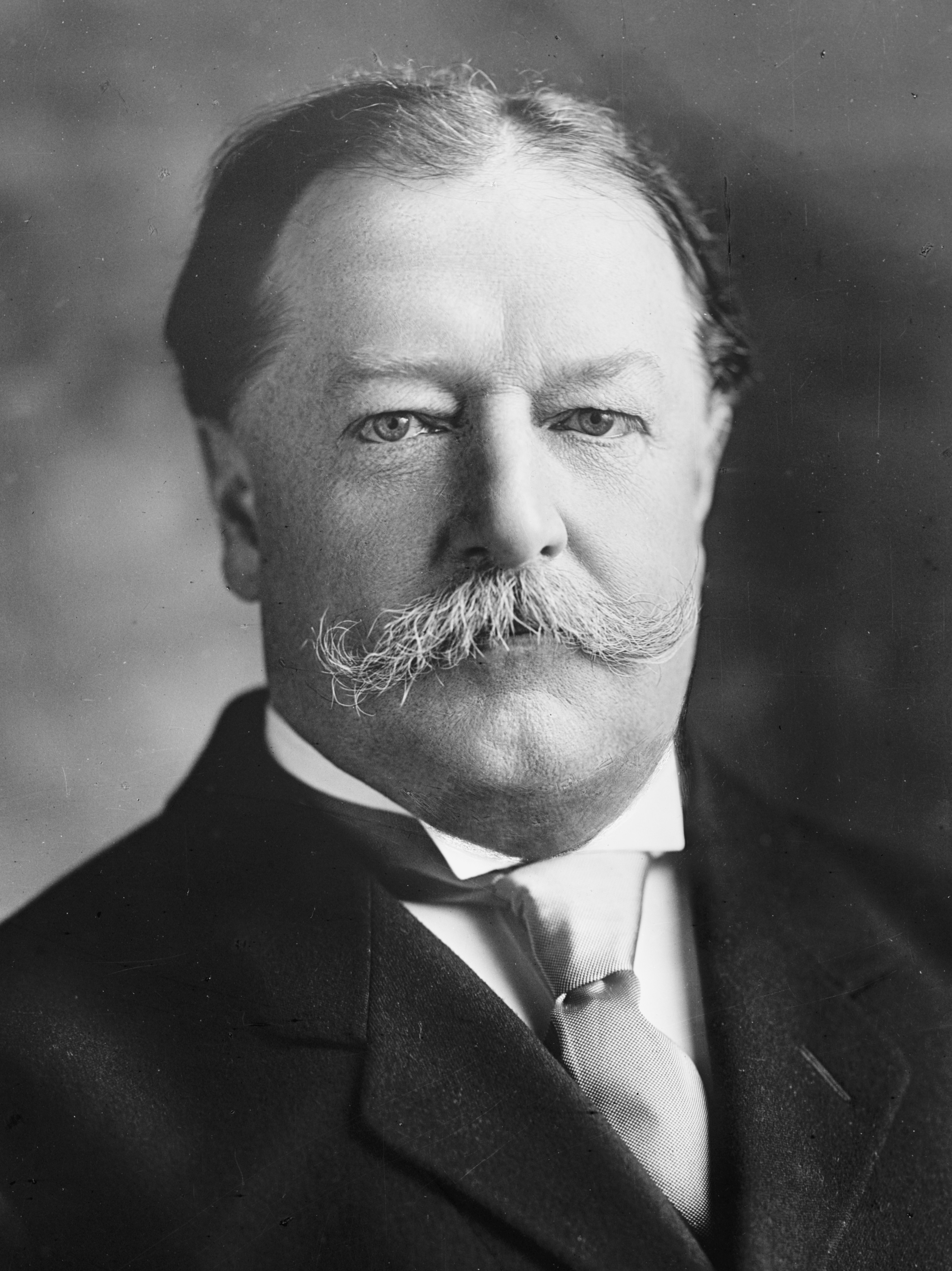

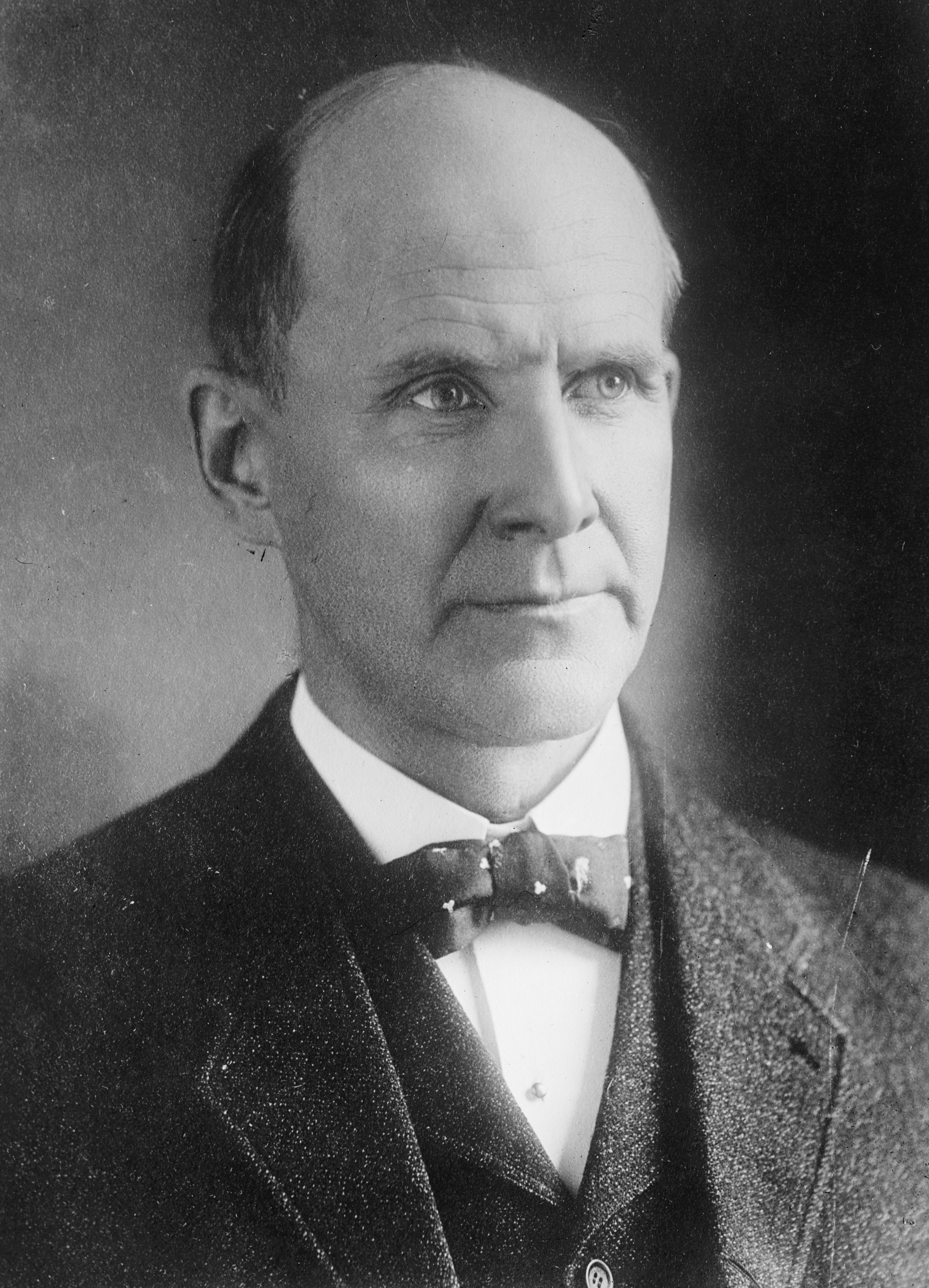
Nominee	Woodrow Wilson	Theodore Roosevelt
Party	Democratic	Progressive
Home state	New Jersey	New York
Running mate	Thomas R. Marshall	Hiram Johnson
Electoral vote	4	0
Popular vote	27,941	22,456
Percentage	35.00%	28.13%
Nominee	William Howard Taft	Eugene Victor Debs
Party	Republican	Socialist
Home state	Ohio	Indiana
Running mate	Nicholas Murray Butler	Emil Seidel
Electoral vote	0	0
Popular vote	18,512	10,885
Percentage	23.19%	13.64%
County results
Wilson
30–40%
40–50%
Roosevelt
30–40%
40–50%
Taft
30–40%
40–50%
President before election
William Howard Taft
Republican
Elected President
Woodrow Wilson
Democratic

The 1912 United States presidential election in Montana took place on November 5, 1912 as part of the 1912 United States presidential election. Voters chose four representatives, or electors to the Electoral College, who voted for president and vice president.

In this four-way contest election, Montana voted for the Democratic nominee New Jersey Governor Woodrow Wilson over the Progressive nominee former President Theodore "Teddy" Roosevelt, Republican nominee President William Howard Taft, and Socialist Party of America nominee union leader Eugene V. Debs. Wilson won the state by a margin of 6.87%.

== Results ==
General election results
Party	Pledged to	Elector	Votes
Democratic Party	Woodrow Wilson	J. C. McCarthy	27,941
Democratic Party	Woodrow Wilson	John MacGinniss	27,306
Democratic Party	Woodrow Wilson	Andrew S. Lohman	27,290
Democratic Party	Woodrow Wilson	George M. Houtz	26,985
Progressive Party	Theodore Roosevelt	Conrad Kohrs	22,456
Progressive Party	Theodore Roosevelt	Sam Gordon	21,937
Progressive Party	Theodore Roosevelt	J. T. Stanford	21,918
Progressive Party	Theodore Roosevelt	A. W. Merrifield	21,662
Republican Party	William Howard Taft	T. A. Cummings	18,512
Republican Party	William Howard Taft	A. W. Miles	17,615
Republican Party	William Howard Taft	C. E. Trescott	17,576
Republican Party	William Howard Taft	T. C. Davidson	17,403
Socialist Party of America	Eugene V. Debs	O. J. Sholl	10,885
Socialist Party of America	Eugene V. Debs	Harry P. Nevills	10,565
Socialist Party of America	Eugene V. Debs	L. J. Whitaker	10,512
Socialist Party of America	Eugene V. Debs	Adam F. Skirving	10,359
Prohibition Party	Eugene Wilder Chafin	J. M. Peats	32
Prohibition Party	Eugene Wilder Chafin	J. F. Chessman	31
Prohibition Party	Eugene Wilder Chafin	G. N. Inabit	31
Prohibition Party	Eugene Wilder Chafin	R. R. Crowe	31
Total votes			79,826

=== Results by county ===
County	Woodrow Wilson Democratic		William Howard Taft Republican		Theodore Roosevelt Progressive "Bull Moose"		Eugene Debs Socialist		Eugene Chafin Prohibition		Margin		Total votes cast
County	#	%	#	%	#	%	#	%	#	%	#	%	Total votes cast
Beaverhead	713	38.50%	708	38.23%	320	17.28%	110	5.94%	1	0.05%	5 (Note: In this county where Roosevelt did run third behind both Wilson and Taft, margin given is Wilson vote minus Taft vote and percentage margin Wilson percentage minus Taft percentage.)	0.27%	1,852
Blaine	318	27.97%	204	17.94%	507	44.59%	108	9.50%			-189	-16.62%	1,137
Broadwater	451	48.34%	205	21.97%	197	21.11%	80	8.57%			246	26.37%	933
Carbon	796	30.66%	646	24.88%	766	29.51%	388	14.95%			30	1.16%	2,596
Cascade	1,633	35.90%	1,079	23.72%	999	21.96%	838	18.42%			554	12.18%	4,549
Chouteau	402	29.69%	561	41.43%	259	19.13%	129	9.53%	3	0.22%	-159	-11.74%	1,354
Custer	1,068	33.34%	695	21.70%	1,192	37.22%	247	7.71%	1	0.03%	-124	-3.87%	3,203
Dawson	719	25.84%	678	24.37%	1,165	41.88%	220	7.91%			-446	-16.03%	2,782
Deer Lodge	1,197	41.85%	1,060	37.06%	464	16.22%	139	4.86%			137	4.79%	2,860
Fergus	1,393	38.03%	745	20.34%	1,104	30.14%	421	11.49%			289	7.89%	3,663
Flathead	1,106	33.50%	493	14.93%	1,256	38.05%	446	13.51%			-150	-4.55%	3,301
Gallatin	1,407	43.41%	683	21.07%	929	28.66%	212	6.54%	10	0.31%	478	14.75%	3,241
Granite	346	38.92%	195	21.93%	256	28.80%	92	10.35%			90	10.12%	889
Hill	624	30.77%	536	26.43%	545	26.87%	323	15.93%			79	3.90%	2,028
Jefferson	479	40.15%	239	20.03%	299	25.06%	176	14.75%			180	15.09%	1,193
Lewis and Clark	1,505	34.72%	1,062	24.50%	1,375	31.72%	391	9.02%	2	0.05%	130	3.00%	4,335
Lincoln	346	34.43%	218	21.69%	206	20.50%	235	23.38%			111 (Note: In this county where Debs ran second behind both Taft and Roosevelt, margin given is Wilson vote minus Debs vote and percentage margin Wilson percentage minus Debs percentage.)	11.05%	1,005
Madison	822	44.12%	506	27.16%	457	24.53%	78	4.19%			316	16.96%	1,863
Meagher	473	39.45%	321	26.77%	327	27.27%	75	6.26%	3	0.25%	146	12.18%	1,199
Missoula	1,523	32.70%	589	12.64%	1,773	38.06%	773	16.60%			-250	-5.37%	4,658
Musselshell	470	29.97%	483	30.80%	400	25.51%	215	13.71%			-13	-0.83%	1,568
Park	666	30.18%	609	27.59%	687	31.13%	245	11.10%			-21	-0.95%	2,207
Powell	545	37.72%	335	23.18%	418	28.93%	147	10.17%			127	8.79%	1,445
Ravalli	858	36.36%	316	13.39%	896	37.97%	282	11.95%	8	0.34%	-38	-1.61%	2,360
Rosebud	313	27.08%	392	33.91%	368	31.83%	80	6.92%	3	0.26%	24 (Note: In this county where Wilson ran third behind both Taft and Roosevelt, margin given is Taft vote minus Roosevelt vote and percentage margin Taft percentage minus Roosevelt percentage.)	2.08%	1,156
Sanders	414	34.30%	257	21.29%	375	31.07%	161	13.34%			39	3.23%	1,207
Silver Bow	4,542	38.18%	2,232	18.76%	1,802	15.15%	3,320	27.91%			1,222	10.27%	11,896
Sweet Grass	277	29.41%	181	19.21%	424	45.01%	60	6.37%			-147	-15.60%	942
Teton	646	32.45%	612	30.74%	446	22.40%	287	14.41%			34	1.71%	1,991
Valley	696	26.92%	668	25.84%	858	33.19%	362	14.00%	1	0.04%	-162	-6.27%	2,585
Yellowstone	1,193	31.17%	1,004	26.23%	1,386	36.21%	245	6.40%			-193	-5.04%	3,828
Totals	27,941	35.00%	18,512	23.19%	22,456	28.13%	10,885	13.64%	32	0.04%	5,485	6.87%	79,826

== See also ==
- United States presidential elections in Montana
