= Chinook, Montana =

City in Montana, United States

- City
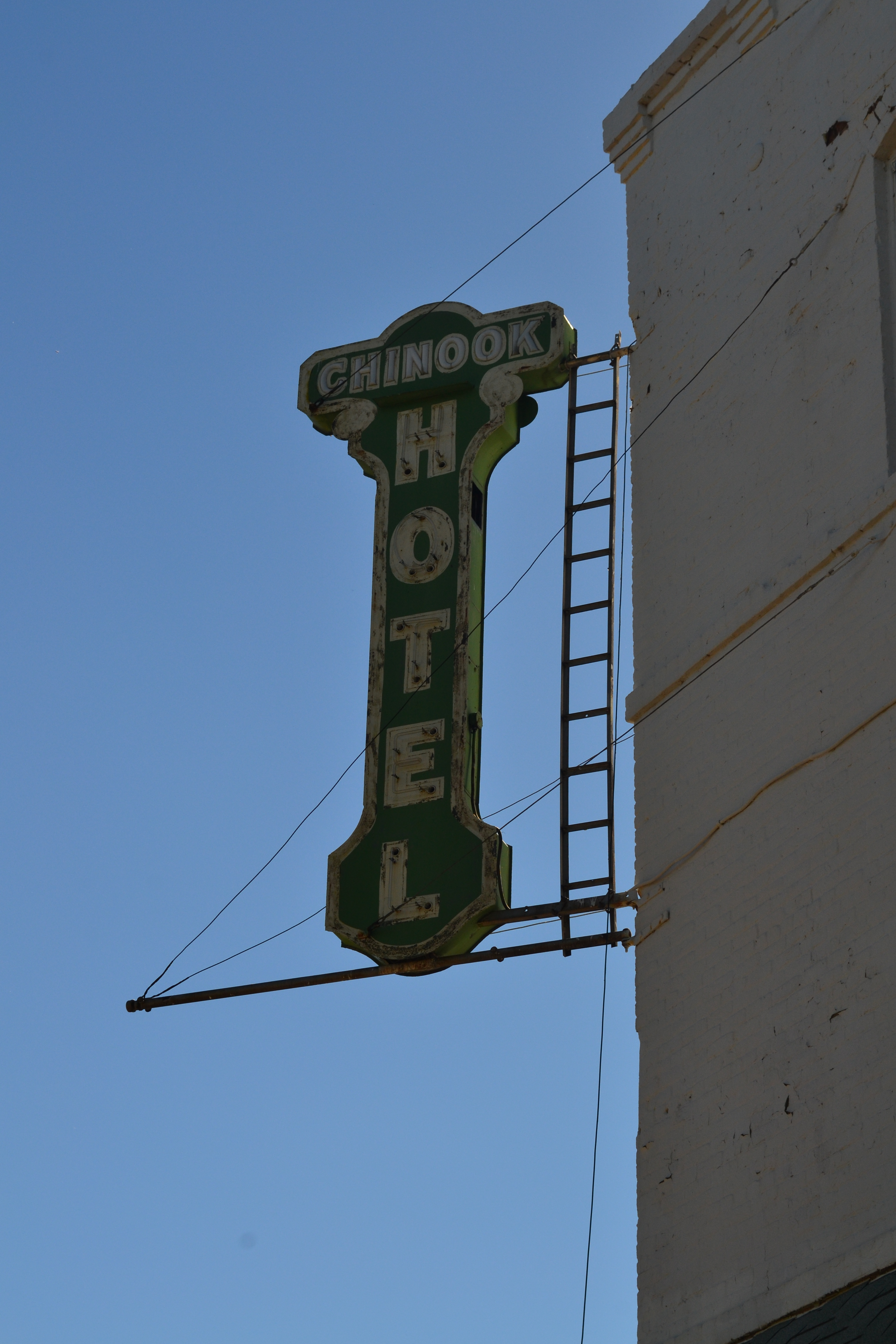

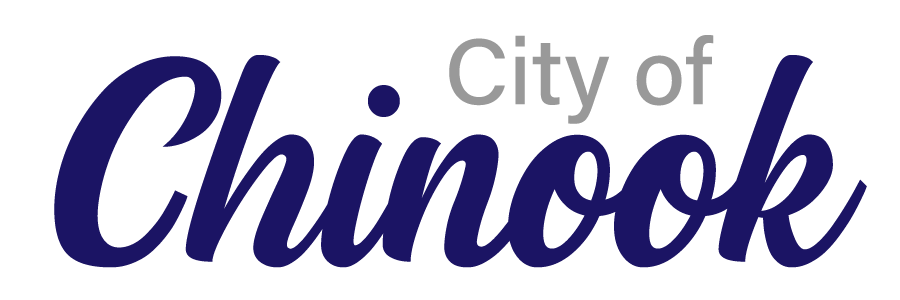
- Logo

- Location of Chinook, Montana
- Coordinates: 48°35′24″N 109°13′55″W
- Country: United States
- State: Montana
- County: Blaine

Government
  - Mayor: Jayson Hauer

Area
  - Total: 0.52 sq mi (1.35 km^{2})
  - Land: 0.52 sq mi (1.35 km^{2})
  - Water: 0 sq mi (0.00 km^{2})
- Elevation: 2,425 ft (739 m)

Population (2020)
  - Total: 1,185
  - Density: 2,267.1/sq mi (875.33/km^{2})
- Time zone: UTC-7 (Mountain (MST))
  - Summer (DST): UTC-6 (MDT)
- ZIP codes: 59523, 59535
- Area code: 406
- FIPS code: 30-14575
- GNIS feature ID: 2409455
- Website: cityofchinook.com

Chinook is a city in and the county seat of Blaine County, Montana, United States. The population was 1,185 at the 2020 census. Points of interest are the Blaine County Museum, Blaine County Wildlife Museum, both located in the town's center, and the Bear Paw Battlefield, located 20 miles (32 km) south of Chinook.

== Name ==
The city is named for the Chinook wind, a warm wind on the eastern side of the Rocky Mountains. Its Gros Ventre name is ʔaasíccóóútaanʔɔ, meaning 'thinker town'. It is said to be named after Thinker, a half-Assiniboine, half-white man who was the son of Thomas O'Hanlon. O'Hanlon was one of the primary founders of the town and an early merchant and community leader.

== Geography ==
Chinook is located on Lodge Creek, where it empties into the Milk River, which flows south of town.

According to the United States Census Bureau, the city has a total area of 0.51 square miles (1.32 km^{2}), all land.

=== Climate ===
Chinook experiences a semi-arid climate (Köppen BSk) with long, cold, dry winters and hot, wetter summers.

Climate data for Chinook, Montana (1991–2020 normals, extremes 1895–present)
Month	Jan	Feb	Mar	Apr	May	Jun	Jul	Aug	Sep	Oct	Nov	Dec	Year
Record high °F (°C)	69 (21)	75 (24)	82 (28)	94 (34)	98 (37)	109 (43)	110 (43)	109 (43)	104 (40)	90 (32)	82 (28)	70 (21)	110 (43)
Mean maximum °F (°C)	54.8 (12.7)	56.1 (13.4)	66.9 (19.4)	78.9 (26.1)	86.3 (30.2)	92.3 (33.5)	98.1 (36.7)	97.9 (36.6)	91.4 (33.0)	79.1 (26.2)	65.7 (18.7)	55.6 (13.1)	99.7 (37.6)
Mean daily maximum °F (°C)	27.1 (−2.7)	31.4 (−0.3)	43.0 (6.1)	56.9 (13.8)	67.0 (19.4)	75.4 (24.1)	84.3 (29.1)	83.3 (28.5)	72.3 (22.4)	56.9 (13.8)	41.3 (5.2)	30.5 (−0.8)	55.8 (13.2)
Daily mean °F (°C)	15.7 (−9.1)	19.2 (−7.1)	30.4 (−0.9)	43.1 (6.2)	53.5 (11.9)	62.4 (16.9)	69.0 (20.6)	67.5 (19.7)	56.8 (13.8)	42.7 (5.9)	29.2 (−1.6)	19.0 (−7.2)	42.4 (5.8)
Mean daily minimum °F (°C)	4.2 (−15.4)	6.9 (−13.9)	17.7 (−7.9)	29.4 (−1.4)	40.0 (4.4)	49.3 (9.6)	53.6 (12.0)	51.7 (10.9)	41.2 (5.1)	28.5 (−1.9)	17.0 (−8.3)	7.5 (−13.6)	28.9 (−1.7)
Mean minimum °F (°C)	−24.1 (−31.2)	−17.8 (−27.7)	−5.2 (−20.7)	15.2 (−9.3)	26.1 (−3.3)	38.2 (3.4)	44.5 (6.9)	40.5 (4.7)	27.9 (−2.3)	10.9 (−11.7)	−6.0 (−21.1)	−16.9 (−27.2)	−32.0 (−35.6)
Record low °F (°C)	−50 (−46)	−51 (−46)	−38 (−39)	−13 (−25)	11 (−12)	28 (−2)	32 (0)	30 (−1)	13 (−11)	−24 (−31)	−38 (−39)	−53 (−47)	−53 (−47)
Average precipitation inches (mm)	0.45 (11)	0.37 (9.4)	0.59 (15)	1.04 (26)	2.42 (61)	2.86 (73)	1.62 (41)	1.14 (29)	0.99 (25)	0.88 (22)	0.69 (18)	0.39 (9.9)	13.44 (341)
Average snowfall inches (cm)	6.8 (17)	6.4 (16)	4.7 (12)	1.6 (4.1)	0.7 (1.8)	0.0 (0.0)	0.0 (0.0)	0.0 (0.0)	0.1 (0.25)	1.2 (3.0)	6.3 (16)	6.0 (15)	33.8 (85.15)
Average extreme snow depth inches (cm)	7.6 (19)	7.2 (18)	7.3 (19)	1.8 (4.6)	0.6 (1.5)	0.0 (0.0)	0.0 (0.0)	0.0 (0.0)	0.1 (0.25)	1.2 (3.0)	4.1 (10)	5.3 (13)	13.7 (35)
Average precipitation days (≥ 0.01 in)	4.8	4.6	4.6	6.4	9.7	11.4	7.2	5.4	6.5	5.5	5.5	4.9	76.5
Average snowy days (≥ 0.1 in)	4.0	4.1	2.9	0.7	0.3	0.0	0.0	0.0	0.1	0.8	3.5	3.6	20.0
Source: NOAA

== Demographics ==
Historical population
Census	Pop.	Note	%±
1910	780		—
1920	1,217		56.0%
1930	1,320		8.5%
1940	2,051		55.4%
1950	2,307		12.5%
1960	2,326		0.8%
1970	1,813		−22.1%
1980	1,660		−8.4%
1990	1,512		−8.9%
2000	1,386		−8.3%
2010	1,203		−13.2%
2020	1,185		−1.5%
U.S. Decennial Census

=== 2010 census ===
As of the census of 2010, there were 1,203 people, 599 households, and 313 families residing in the city. The population density was 2,358.8 inhabitants per square mile (910.7/km^{2}). There were 697 housing units at an average density of 1,366.7 per square mile (527.7/km^{2}). The racial makeup of the city was 88.4% White, 9.3% Native American, 0.3% Asian, 0.1% from other races, and 1.9% from two or more races. Hispanic or Latino of any race were 1.2% of the population.

There were 599 households, of which 23.7% had children under the age of 18 living with them, 39.9% were married couples living together, 9.2% had a female householder with no husband present, 3.2% had a male householder with no wife present, and 47.7% were non-families. 43.9% of all households were made up of individuals, and 21.2% had someone living alone who was 65 years of age or older. The average household size was 2.01 and the average family size was 2.79.

The median age in the city was 46.7 years. 21.4% of residents were under the age of 18; 5.6% were between the ages of 18 and 24; 20.4% were from 25 to 44; 29.1% were from 45 to 64; and 23.4% were 65 years of age or older. The gender makeup of the city was 48.9% male and 51.1% female.

=== 2000 census ===
As of the census of 2000, there were 1,386 people, 657 households, and 375 families residing in the city. The population density was 2,693.2 inhabitants per square mile (1,039.9/km^{2}). There were 732 housing units at an average density of 1,422.4 per square mile (549.2/km^{2}). The racial makeup of the city was 91.34% White, 0.36% African American, 6.35% "Native American", 0.07% Asian, 0.29% from other races, and 1.59% from two or more races. Hispanic or Latino of any race were 0.58% of the population.

There were 657 households, out of which 26.3% had children under the age of 18 living with them, 45.4% were married couples living together, 9.9% had a female householder with no husband present, and 42.9% were non-families. 39.6% of all households were made up of individuals, and 21.6% had someone living alone who was 65 years of age or older. The average household size was 2.10 and the average family size was 2.84.

In the city, the population was spread out, with 23.6% under the age of 18, 5.3% from 18 to 24, 24.0% from 25 to 44, 23.4% from 45 to 64, and 23.7% who were 65 years of age or older. The median age was 43 years. For every 100 females there were 89.6 males. For every 100 females age 18 and over, there were 86.8 males.

The median income for a household in the city was $25,461, and the median income for a family was $35,577. Males had a median income of $26,667 versus $20,179 for females. The per capita income for the city was $16,038. About 12.1% of families and 17.3% of the population were below the poverty line, including 20.8% of those under age 18 and 20.1% of those age 65 or over.

== Arts and culture ==
Blaine County Museum focuses on the history of the area. This includes the Gorgosaurus from 80 million years ago, to the Plains Tribes, to settlers in the 19th and 20th century. The Blaine County Wildlife Museum, open during the summer, showcases wildlife species in their natural habitats.

Chinook is home to the Blaine County Library.

== Government ==
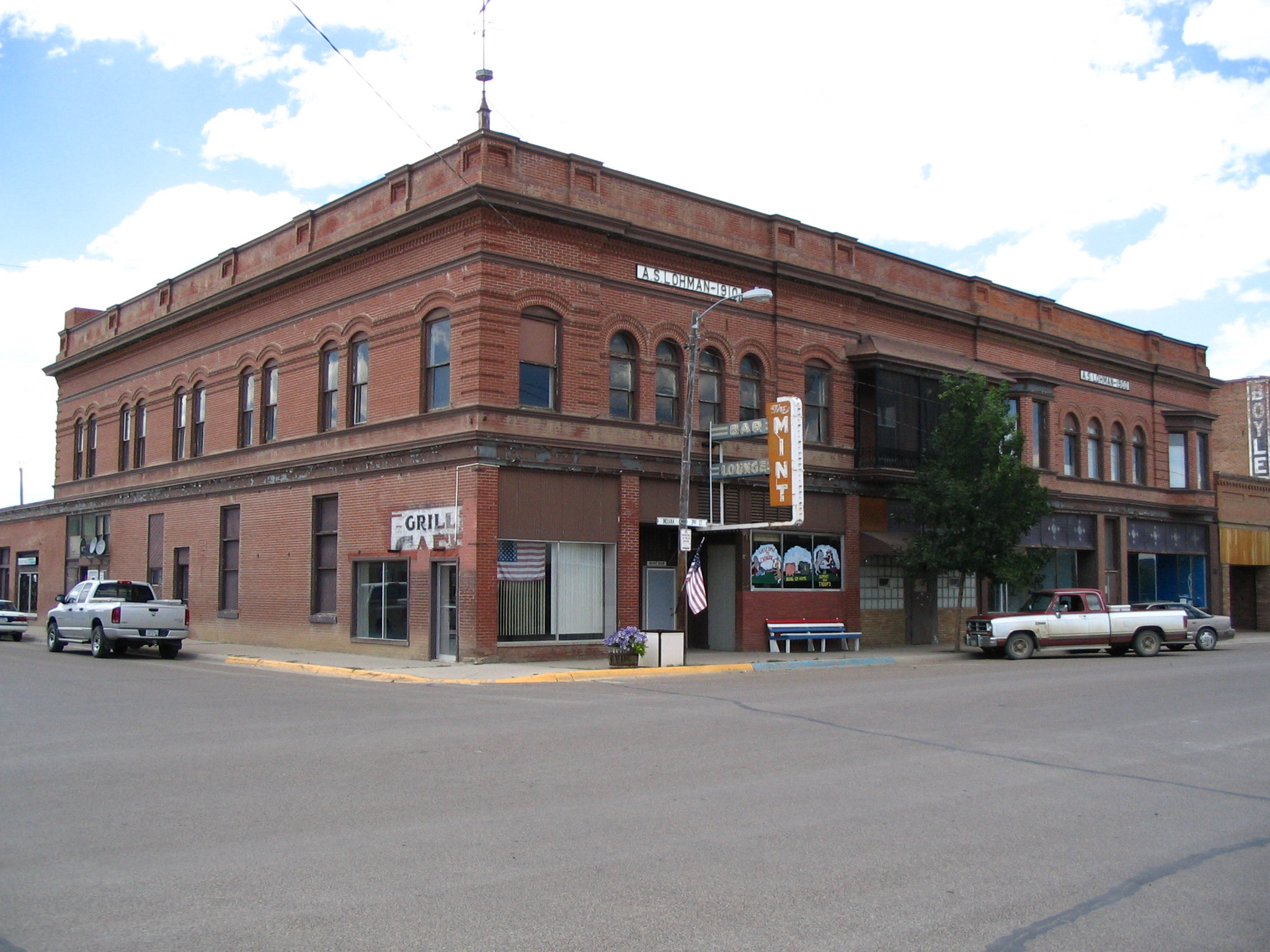
Lohman Building

The town has a mayor-council system of government. There are four council members.

Jayson Hauer became mayor in November 2025. He replaced interim mayor Robert Smith. Smith was appointed to fill Glen Huestis's position when Huestis resigned due to health issues in February 2025.

== Education ==
The town is in the Chinook Elementary School District and the Chinook High School District. Both are components of Chinook Public Schools.

Chinook Public Schools serves students from kindergarten to 12th grade. Chinook High School is a Class B school (more than 108 students) which helps determine athletic competitions.

=== Chinook High School Sugarbeeters ===
Chinook High School experienced national notoriety when a USA today contest was held to discover the nation's oddest mascot. Chinook's mascot, the Sugarbeeter, finished third in the voting and has since been the topic of multiple articles.

Chinook has been home to the Sugarbeeters ever since the Utah-Idaho Sugar Company, which had a factory in the town, helped purchase the jerseys for the boys' basketball team in 1929. Ever since the team made their debut in the jerseys, which presented a Sugarbeet logo on the front, the nickname has been fully adopted.

== Media ==
The Blaine County Journal News-Opinion is a local weekly newspaper. It is available in print or online.

The FM radio station KRYK is licensed in Chinook. The station airs a hot adult contemporary music format.

== Infrastructure ==
U.S. Route 2 travels through the northern part of town from east to west.

Edgar G. Obie Airport is a public use airport 1 mile west of Chinook. The nearest commercial flights are at Havre City–County Airport.

One Health provides primary care to Blaine County. There are clinics in both Chinook and Harlem, Montana.

== Transportation ==
Amtrak’s Empire Builder, which operates between Seattle/Portland and Chicago, passes through the town on BNSF tracks, but makes no stop. The nearest station is located in Havre, 22 miles (35 km) to the west.

== Notable people ==
- Elliott Blackstone, sergeant of the San Francisco Police Department and longtime advocate for LGBT rights
- Chet Blaylock, former member of the Montana State Senate, taught at a school in the city
- U.S. Grant Sharp, Jr., former United States Navy four star admiral and Commander in Chief of the United States Pacific Fleet
