= Harlem, Montana =

City in Montana, United States

Harlem, Montana Akásam Tʿiʾóta (Assiniboine)
- City
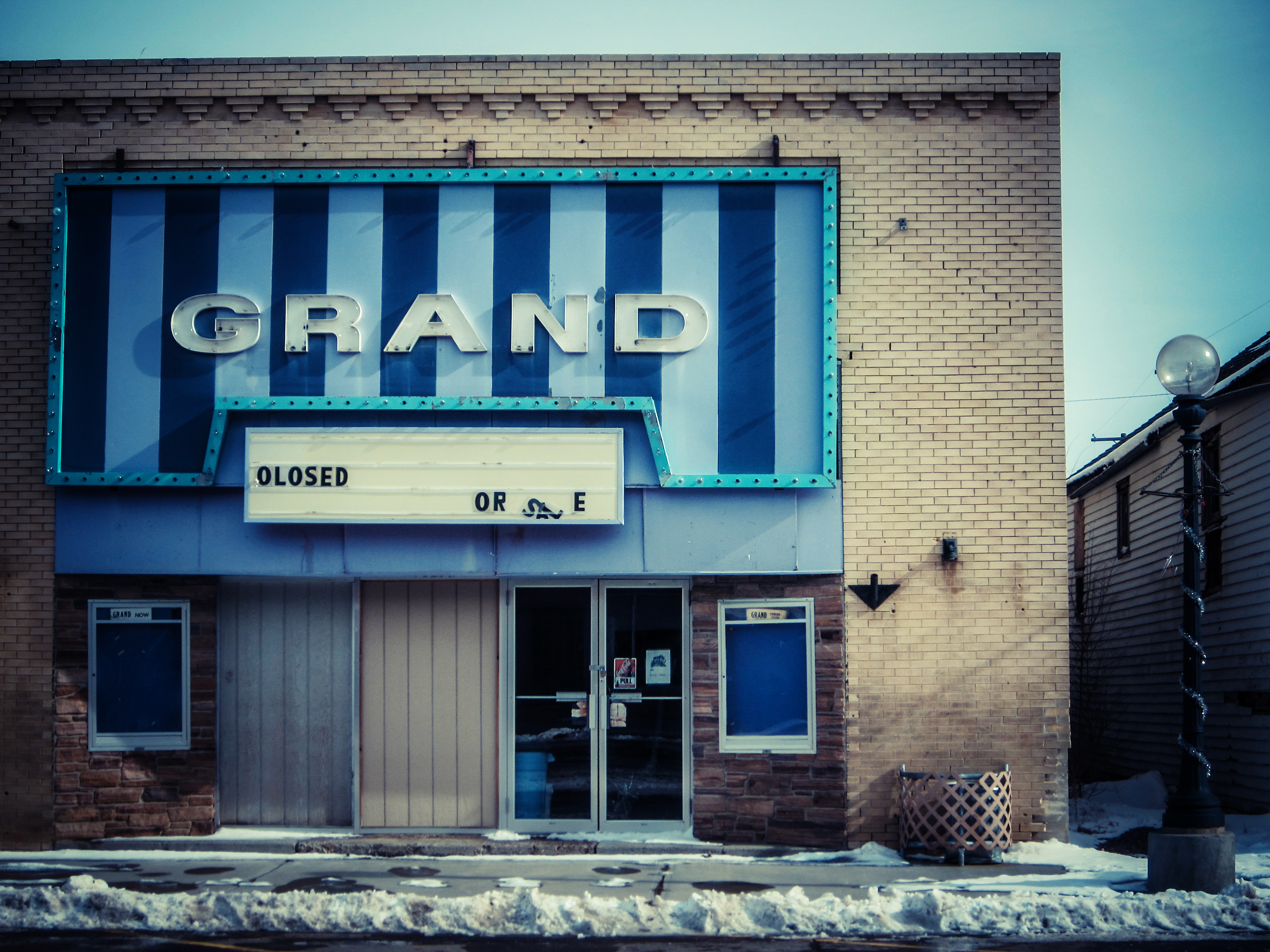
- Cinema in Harlem, March 2012

- Seal
- Motto: Heartbeat of the Milk River Valley
- Location of Harlem, Montana
- Coordinates: 48°31′55″N 108°47′05″W
- Country: United States
- State: Montana
- County: Blaine

Area
  - Total: 0.42 sq mi (1.08 km^{2})
  - Land: 0.42 sq mi (1.08 km^{2})
  - Water: 0 sq mi (0.00 km^{2})
- Elevation: 2,366 ft (721 m)

Population (2020)
  - Total: 769
  - Density: 1,838.4/sq mi (709.82/km^{2})
- Time zone: UTC-7 (Mountain (MST))
  - Summer (DST): UTC-6 (MDT)
- ZIP code: 59526
- Area code: 406
- FIPS code: 30-34375
- GNIS feature ID: 2410702
- Website: www.harlem-mt.gov

Harlem is a city in Blaine County, Montana, United States. The population was 769 at the 2020 census.

The Fort Belknap Indian Reservation is just south of the town, across the Milk River.

Like other towns along the Hi-Line, Great Northern Railway officials chose the name of a European city for this new town. In this case it was Haarlem, in the Netherlands. A. A. Cecil platted the townsite in 1889.

== Geography ==
According to the United States Census Bureau, the city has a total area of 0.43 square miles (1.11 km^{2}), all land.

=== Climate ===
Climate data for Harlem, Montana (1991–2020 normals, extremes 1896–present)
Month	Jan	Feb	Mar	Apr	May	Jun	Jul	Aug	Sep	Oct	Nov	Dec	Year
Record high °F (°C)	66 (19)	74 (23)	82 (28)	95 (35)	98 (37)	107 (42)	107 (42)	107 (42)	102 (39)	91 (33)	87 (31)	69 (21)	107 (42)
Mean maximum °F (°C)	53.4 (11.9)	56.0 (13.3)	66.4 (19.1)	79.6 (26.4)	85.8 (29.9)	92.6 (33.7)	97.2 (36.2)	98.3 (36.8)	91.5 (33.1)	79.0 (26.1)	66.5 (19.2)	54.2 (12.3)	100.2 (37.9)
Mean daily maximum °F (°C)	28.2 (−2.1)	32.7 (0.4)	45.0 (7.2)	58.8 (14.9)	69.0 (20.6)	76.6 (24.8)	85.0 (29.4)	84.7 (29.3)	74.1 (23.4)	59.7 (15.4)	43.3 (6.3)	30.9 (−0.6)	57.3 (14.1)
Daily mean °F (°C)	16.6 (−8.6)	20.8 (−6.2)	32.5 (0.3)	44.4 (6.9)	54.3 (12.4)	62.6 (17.0)	69.3 (20.7)	68.2 (20.1)	57.9 (14.4)	45.1 (7.3)	31.1 (−0.5)	19.8 (−6.8)	43.6 (6.4)
Mean daily minimum °F (°C)	5.0 (−15.0)	8.9 (−12.8)	19.9 (−6.7)	29.9 (−1.2)	39.7 (4.3)	48.7 (9.3)	53.5 (11.9)	51.6 (10.9)	41.7 (5.4)	30.4 (−0.9)	18.9 (−7.3)	8.7 (−12.9)	29.7 (−1.3)
Mean minimum °F (°C)	−24.5 (−31.4)	−17.3 (−27.4)	−4.3 (−20.2)	13.5 (−10.3)	24.9 (−3.9)	36.2 (2.3)	43.3 (6.3)	38.4 (3.6)	26.7 (−2.9)	10.4 (−12.0)	−6.7 (−21.5)	−15.2 (−26.2)	−32.1 (−35.6)
Record low °F (°C)	−50 (−46)	−50 (−46)	−37 (−38)	−12 (−24)	10 (−12)	26 (−3)	35 (2)	30 (−1)	13 (−11)	−20 (−29)	−35 (−37)	−44 (−42)	−50 (−46)
Average precipitation inches (mm)	0.51 (13)	0.36 (9.1)	0.52 (13)	1.00 (25)	1.89 (48)	2.90 (74)	1.44 (37)	0.99 (25)	1.09 (28)	0.73 (19)	0.57 (14)	0.50 (13)	12.50 (318)
Average precipitation days (≥ 0.01 in)	4.8	3.6	4.7	6.2	9.5	12.1	6.7	5.2	5.3	5.0	5.3	4.0	72.4
Source: NOAA

== Demographics ==
Historical population
Census	Pop.	Note	%±
1910	383		—
1920	721		88.3%
1930	708		−1.8%
1940	1,166		64.7%
1950	1,107		−5.1%
1960	1,267		14.5%
1970	1,094		−13.7%
1980	1,023		−6.5%
1990	882		−13.8%
2000	848		−3.9%
2010	808		−4.7%
2020	769		−4.8%
U.S. Decennial Census

=== 2010 census ===
As of the census of 2010, there were 808 people, 307 households, and 204 families residing in the city. The population density was 1,879.1 inhabitants per square mile (725.5/km^{2}). There were 359 housing units at an average density of 834.9 per square mile (322.4/km^{2}). The racial makeup of the city was 42.1% White, 52.2% Native American, 0.1% Pacific Islander, 0.1% from other races, and 5.4% from two or more races. Hispanic or Latino of any race were 4.0% of the population.

There were 307 households, of which 36.2% had children under the age of 18 living with them, 44.6% were married couples living together, 15.6% had a female householder with no husband present, 6.2% had a male householder with no wife present, and 33.6% were non-families. 29.6% of all households were made up of individuals, and 14.7% had someone living alone who was 65 years of age or older. The average household size was 2.49 and the average family size was 3.08.

The median age in the city was 36.6 years. 28.6% of residents were under the age of 18; 8.5% were between the ages of 18 and 24; 22.4% were from 25 to 44; 23.7% were from 45 to 64; and 17% were 65 years of age or older. The gender makeup of the city was 45.3% male and 54.7% female.

=== 2000 census ===
As of the census of 2000, there were 848 people, 332 households, and 232 families residing in the city. The population density was 1,976.7 inhabitants per square mile (763.2/km^{2}). There were 401 housing units at an average density of 934.7 per square mile (360.9/km^{2}). The racial makeup of the city was 52.59% White, 0.24% African American, 42.57% Native American, 0.24% Asian, 0.12% from other races, and 4.25% from two or more races. Hispanic or Latino of any race were 1.65% of the population.

There were 332 households, out of which 33.4% had children under the age of 18 living with them, 51.2% were married couples living together, 15.1% had a female householder with no husband present, and 30.1% were non-families. 29.5% of all households were made up of individuals, and 11.7% had someone living alone who was 65 years of age or older. The average household size was 2.50 and the average family size was 3.09.

In the city, the population was spread out, with 29.4% under the age of 18, 7.9% from 18 to 24, 22.4% from 25 to 44, 23.7% from 45 to 64, and 16.6% who were 65 years of age or older. The median age was 37 years. For every 100 females there were 89.7 males. For every 100 females age 18 and over, there were 93.2 males.

The median income for a household in the city was $27,794, and the median income for a family was $33,828. Males had a median income of $24,145 versus $21,750 for females. The per capita income for the city was $13,295. About 16.5% of families and 23.0% of the population were below the poverty line, including 32.8% of those under age 18 and 8.5% of those age 65 or over.

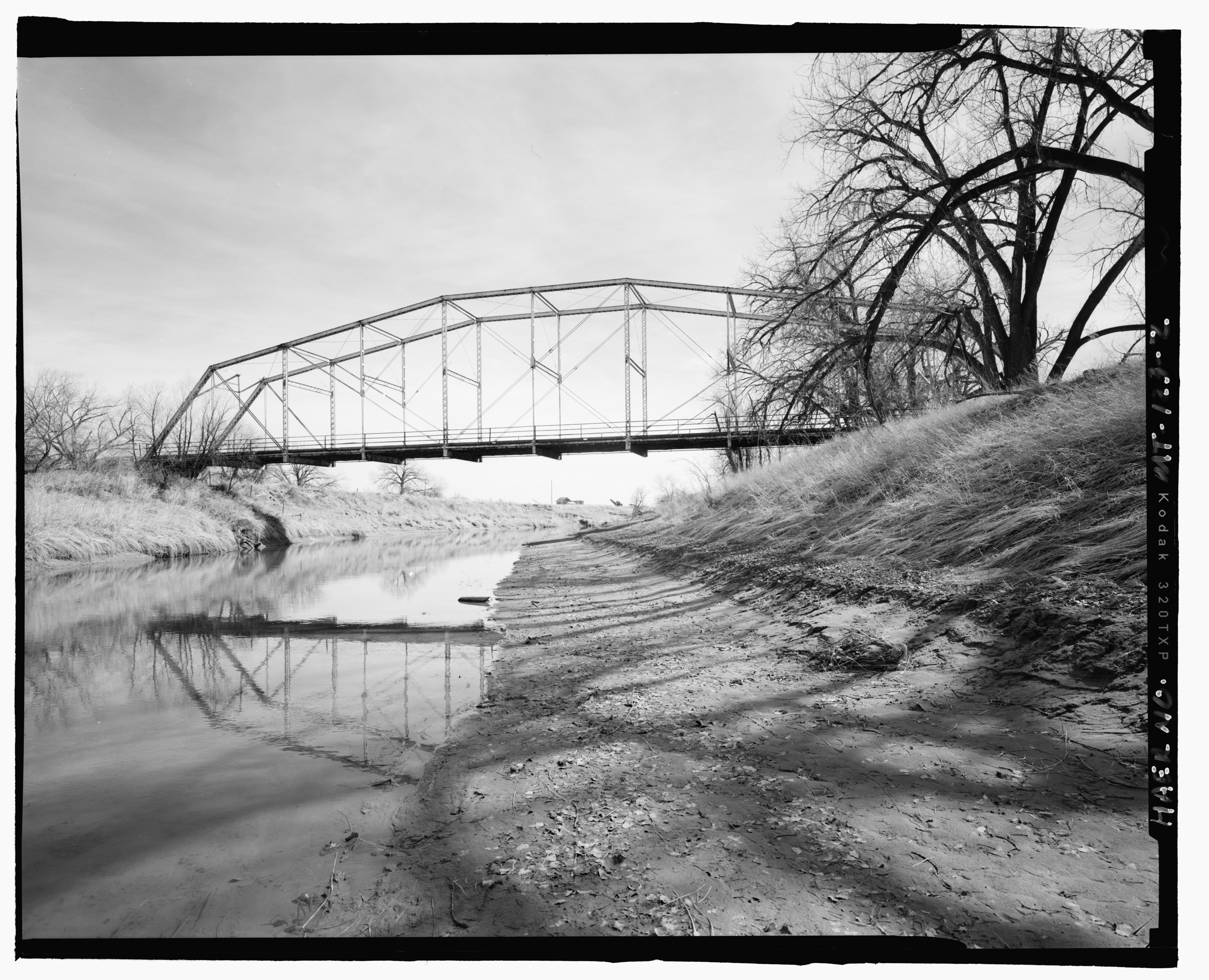
Merrill Bridge, spanning Milk River at Snake Creek-Merrill Road, west of Harlem

== Education ==
It is in the Harlem Elementary School District and the Harlem High School District. Both are components of Harlem Public Schools.

Harlem is home to Harlem Elementary, Middle School and Harlem High School. The team name is the Wildcats.

The Harlem Elementary District consists of a grade school with students from kindergarten to 6th grade and a middle school for 7th and 8th grade students. The district had a total of 453 students enrolled for the 2021-2022 school year.

The Harlem High School educates students from 9th to 12th grade. In the 2021-2022 school year, 175 students were enrolled.

Aaniiih Nakoda College is a two year institution in the town. It offers associate degrees in eleven disciplines and vocational training in five others.

Harlem Public Library serves the area.

== Media ==
The Blaine County Journal News-Opinion is a local weekly newspaper. It is available in print or online.

== Infrastructure ==
U.S. Route 2 forms the southern border of the town. Highway 241 exits north of town and leads to the Turner–Climax Border Crossing.

Harlem Airport is a public use airport located three miles (6 km) north of town. The nearest commercial airport is Havre City–County Airport, 48 miles (77 km) east. It offers regional flights only. For full flight service, residents must travel to either Great Falls International Airport or Billings Logan International Airport, both about 200 miles (322 km) away.

== Transportation ==
Amtrak’s Empire Builder, which operates between Seattle/Portland and Chicago, passes through the town on BNSF tracks, but makes no stop. The nearest stations are located in Havre, 43 miles (69 km) to the west, and Malta, 45 miles (72 km) to the east.

== Notable people ==
- Francis Bardanouve, politician
- Ken Hansen, state senator
- Frank Warnke, politician

== See also ==
- List of municipalities in Montana
