= List of airports in Montana =

This is a list of airports in Montana (a U.S. state), grouped by type and sorted by location. It contains all public-use and military airports in the state. Some private-use and former airports may be included where notable, such as airports that were previously public-use, those with commercial enplanements recorded by the FAA or airports assigned an IATA airport code.

== Airports ==
This list contains the following information:

- **City served** – The city generally associated with the airport, as per the airport's master record with the Federal Aviation Administration. This is not always the actual location since some airports are located in smaller towns outside of the city they serve. It is not meant to be a complete list of cities served, which can be found in or added to each airport's Wikipedia article.
- **FAA** – The location identifier assigned by the Federal Aviation Administration (FAA).
- **IATA** – The airport code assigned by the International Air Transport Association (IATA). Those that do not match the FAA code are shown in bold.
- **ICAO** – The location indicator assigned by the International Civil Aviation Organization (ICAO).
- **Airport name** – The official airport name. Those shown in **bold** indicate the airport has scheduled passenger service on commercial airlines.
- **Role** – One of four FAA airport categories, as per the 2021–2025 National Plan of Integrated Airport Systems (NPIAS) report released October 2020:
  - P-s: Commercial service – primary are publicly owned airports that receive scheduled passenger service and have more than 10,000 passenger boardings (enplanements) each year. Each primary airport is sub-classified by the FAA as one of the following four "hub" types (s):
    - L: Large hub that accounts for at least 1% of total U.S. passenger enplanements.
    - M: Medium hub that accounts for between 0.25% and 1% of total U.S. passenger enplanements.
    - S: Small hub that accounts for between 0.05% and 0.25% of total U.S. passenger enplanements.
    - N: Nonhub that accounts for less than 0.05% of total U.S. passenger enplanements, but more than 10,000 annual enplanements.
  - CS: Commercial service – nonprimary are publicly owned airports that receive scheduled passenger service and have at least 2,500 passenger boardings each year.
  - R: Reliever airports are designated by the FAA to relieve congestion at a large commercial service airport and to provide more general aviation access to the overall community.
  - GA: General aviation airports are the largest single group of airports in the U.S. airport system. They are public-use airports that do not have scheduled service or have scheduled service with less than 2,500 passenger boardings each year.
- **Enplanements** – The number of enplanements (commercial passenger boardings) that occurred at the airport in calendar year 2024, as per FAA records released October 2025.

City served	FAA	IATA	ICAO	Airport name	Role	Enplanements (2024)
				**Commercial service – primary airports**		
Billings	BIL	BIL	KBIL	**Billings Logan International Airport**	P-S	475,334
Bozeman	BZN	BZN	KBZN	**Bozeman Yellowstone International Airport** (was Gallatin Field)	P-S	1,321,790
Butte	BTM	BTM	KBTM	**Bert Mooney Airport**	P-N	15,773
Great Falls	GTF	GTF	KGTF	**Great Falls International Airport**	P-N	186,778
Helena	HLN	HLN	KHLN	**Helena Regional Airport**	P-N	101,591
Kalispell	GPI	**FCA**	KGPI	**Glacier Park International Airport**	P-S	503,816
Missoula	MSO	MSO	KMSO	**Missoula Montana Airport** (was Missoula International Airport)	P-S	511,553
West Yellowstone	WYS	WYS	KWYS	**Yellowstone Airport**	P-N	9,569
				**Commercial service – nonprimary airports**		
Glasgow	GGW	GGW	KGGW	**Glasgow–Valley County Airport** (Wokal Field)	CS	2,970
Havre	HVR	HVR	KHVR	**Havre City–County Airport**	CS	3,095
Sidney	SDY	SDY	KSDY	**Sidney-Richland Regional Airport**	CS	7,331
Wolf Point	OLF	OLF	KOLF	**L. M. Clayton Airport**	CS	3,183
				**General aviation airports**		
Anaconda	3U3			Bowman Field	GA	0
Baker	BHK		KBHK	Baker Municipal Airport	GA	0
Big Sandy	3U8			Big Sandy Airport	GA	0
Big Timber	6S0			Big Timber Airport	GA	0
Broadus	00F			Broadus Airport (new airport, replaced BDX)	GA	0
Chester	LTY		KLTY	Liberty County Airport	GA	0
Chinook	S71			Edgar G. Obie Airport	GA	0
Choteau	CII		KCII	Choteau Airport	GA	0
Circle	4U6			Circle Town County Airport	GA	0
Colstrip	M46			Colstrip Airport	GA	0
Columbus	6S3			Woltermann Memorial Airport (was Columbus Airport)	GA	0
Conrad	S01			Conrad Airport	GA	0
Culbertson	S85			Big Sky Field	GA	0
Cut Bank	CTB	CTB	KCTB	Cut Bank International Airport	GA	0
Deer Lodge	38S			Deer Lodge-City-County Airport	GA	9
Dillon	DLN	DLN	KDLN	Dillon Airport	GA	0
Ekalaka	97M			Ekalaka Airport	GA	0
Ennis	EKS		KEKS	Ennis Big Sky Airport	GA	10
Eureka	88M			Eureka Airport	GA	0
Forsyth	1S3			Tillitt Field	GA	0
Fort Benton	79S			Fort Benton Airport	GA	0
Gardiner	29S			Gardiner Airport	GA	0
Geraldine	5U8			Geraldine Airport	GA	0
Glendive	GDV	GDV	KGDV	**Dawson Community Airport**	GA	2,130
Hamilton	HRF		KHRF	Ravalli County Airport	GA	19
Hardin	00U			Big Horn County Airport (airport opened in 2014)	GA	0
Harlem	48S			Harlem Airport	GA	0
Harlowton	HWQ		KHWQ	Wheatland County Airport at Harlowton	GA	0
Jordan	JDN	JDN	KJDN	Jordan Airport	GA	0
Kalispell	S27			Kalispell City Airport	GA	0
Laurel	6S8			Laurel Municipal Airport	GA	0
Lewistown	LWT	LWT	KLWT	Lewistown Municipal Airport	GA	0
Libby	S59			Libby Airport	GA	0
Lincoln	S69			Lincoln Airport	GA	0
Livingston	LVM	LVM	KLVM	Mission Field	GA	2
Malta	M75	MLK		Malta Airport	GA	0
Miles City	MLS	MLS	KMLS	Frank Wiley Field	GA	0
Philipsburg	U05			Riddick Field	GA	0
Plains	S34			Plains Airport	GA	0
Plentywood	PWD	PWD	KPWD	Sher-Wood Airport	GA	0
Polson	8S1			Polson Airport	GA	0
Poplar	PO1			Poplar Municipal Airport (opened 2010, replaced 42S)	GA	0
Red Lodge	RED		KRED	Red Lodge Airport	GA	2
Ronan	7S0			Ronan Airport	GA	6
Roundup	RPX	RPX	KRPX	Roundup Airport	GA	0
Scobey	9S2			Scobey Airport	GA	0
Shelby	SBX	SBX	KSBX	Shelby Airport	GA	0
Stanford	S64			Stanford Airport (Biggerstaff Field)	GA	0
Stevensville	32S			Stevensville Airport	GA	0
Superior	9S4			Mineral County Airport	GA	0
Terry	8U6			Terry Airport	GA	0
Thompson Falls	THM		KTHM	Thompson Falls Airport	GA	0
Three Forks	9S5			Three Forks Airport	GA	0
Townsend	8U8			Townsend Airport	GA	0
Turner	9U0			Turner Airport	GA	0
Twin Bridges	RVF		KRVF	Ruby Valley Field	GA	8
Valier	7S7			Valier Airport	GA	0
White Sulphur Springs	7S6			White Sulphur Springs Airport	GA	0
Winifred	9S7			Winifred Airport	GA	0
				**Other public-use airports** (not listed in NPIAS)		
Ashland	3U4			St. Labre Mission Airport		
Augusta	3U5			Augusta Airport		
Babb	49S			Babb Airport		
Benchmark	3U7			Benchmark Airport		
Big Fork	53U			Ferndale Airfield		
Boulder	3U9			Boulder Airport		
Bridger	6S1			Bridger Municipal Airport		
Browning	8S0			Starr-Browning Airstrip		0
Clinton	RC0			Rock Creek Airport		
Conner	4U7			West Fork Lodge Airport		
Dell	4U9			Dell Flight Strip		
Denton	5U0			Denton Airport		
Drummond	M26	DRU		Drummond Airport		
Dutton	5U1			Dutton Airport		
Fairfield	5U5			Fairfield Airport		
Fairview	5U6			Fairview Airport		
Fort Peck	37S			Fort Peck Airport		
Fort Smith	5U7			Fort Smith Landing Strip		
Harlem	U09			Fort Belknap Agency Airport		
Hinsdale	6U5			Hinsdale Airport		
Hogeland	6U6			Hogeland Airport		
Hot Springs	S09			Hot Springs Airport		
Hysham	6U7			Hysham Airport		
Lavina	80S			Lavina Airport		
Opheim	S00			Opheim Airport		
Port of Del Bonita	H28			Whetstone International Airport		
Richey	7U8			Richey Airport		
Russian Flat	M42			Russian Flat Airport		
Ryegate	8U0			Ryegate Airport		
St. Ignatius	52S			St. Ignatius Airport		
Sand Springs	8U1			Sand Springs Strip		
Scobey	8U3			Scobey Border Station/East Poplar Airport		
Seeley Lake	23S			Seeley Lake Airport		
Seeley Lake	M35			Lindey's Landing West Seaplane Base		
Sweet Grass	7S8			Ross Airport		
Tiber Dam	B70			Tiber Dam Airport		
Townsend	8U9			Canyon Ferry Airport		
Troy	57S			Troy Airport		
Whitefish	58S			Whitefish Airport		
Wilsall	9U1			Wilsall Airport		
Winifred	BB0			Black Butte North Airport		
Winifred	BW8			Bullwhacker Airport		
Winifred	CW0			Cow Creek Airport		
Winifred	MT3			Knox Ridge Airport		
Winifred	LC0			Left Coulee Airport		
Winifred	WH0			Woodhawk Airport		
Winnett	7S2			Winnett Airport		
Wisdom	7S4			Wisdom Airport		
Wise River	02T			Wise River Airport		
				**Other military airports**		
Great Falls	GFA	GFA	KGFA	Malmstrom Air Force Base (heliport)		
				**USFS (United States Forest Service) airports**		
Condon	S04			Condon USFS Airport		
Meadow Creek	0S1			Meadow Creek USFS Airport		
Schafer	8U2			Schafer USFS Airport		
Spotted Bear	8U4			Spotted Bear USFS Airport		
				**Notable private-use airports**		
Chinook	3MT4			Maddox Ranch Company Airport		
Glasgow	07MT			Glasgow Industrial Airport (was Glasgow Air Force Base)		
				**Notable former airports**		
Belle Creek	~~3V7~~			Belle Creek Airport (closed 2009?)		
Broadus	~~BDX~~	~~BDX~~	~~KBDX~~	Broadus Airport (closed 2006, new airport 00F)	~~GA~~	
Glasgow	~~GSG~~			Glasgow Air Force Base (closed 1976)		
Hardin	~~F02~~			Fairgrounds Airpark		
Helena	~~5M7~~			Mountain Lakes Field (closed 2010?)		
Morgan / Loring	~~7U4~~			Morgan Airport (closed 2008?)		
Poplar	~~42S~~			Poplar Airport (closed 2010, new airport PO1)	~~GA~~	
Sunburst	~~8U5~~			Sunburst Airport		
Twin Bridges	~~7S1~~			Twin Bridges Airport		

== See also ==
- Essential Air Service
- Montana World War II Army Airfields
- Wikipedia:WikiProject Aviation/Airline destination lists: North America#Montana
