= Fairfield Airport (disambiguation) =

Fairfield Airport may refer to:

- Fairfield Airport in Fairfield, Montana, United States (FAA: 5U5)
- Fairfield Municipal Airport (Illinois) in Fairfield, Illinois, United States (FAA: FWC)
- Fairfield Municipal Airport (Iowa) in Fairfield, Iowa, United States (FAA: FFL)

== See also ==
- Fairfield County Airport (disambiguation)
- Fairfield Municipal Airport (disambiguation)
