= Fairfield Municipal Airport =

Fairfield Municipal Airport may refer to:

- Fairfield Municipal Airport (Iowa) in Fairfield, Iowa, United States (FAA: FFL)
- Fairfield Municipal Airport (Illinois) in Fairfield, Illinois, United States (FAA: FWC)

== See also ==
- Fairfield Airport (disambiguation)
- Fairfield County Airport (disambiguation)
