= Morgan Airport =

Airport in Montana, United States

- IATA: none; ICAO: none; FAA LID: 7U4

Summary
- Airport type: Public
- Owner: Phillips County
- Serves: Morgan / Loring, Montana
- Elevation AMSL: 2,813 ft / 857 m
- Coordinates: 48°59′58″N 107°50′39″W

Map
- Location of airport in Montana

Runways
Direction	Length		Surface
Direction	ft	m	Surface
7/25	3,000	914	Turf
- Source: Federal Aviation Administration

Morgan Airport (FAA LID: 7U4) was a county-owned, public-use airport in Phillips County, Montana, United States. It is located 14 miles (23 km) north of Loring, near Morgan.

As of August 15, 2014, the 7U4 FAA code is unknown in the FAA NASR system.

In the List of airports in Montana, it is listed as a notable former airport which closed circa 2008.

== Facilities ==
Morgan Airport covers an area of 21 acres (8.5 ha) at an elevation of 2,813 feet (857 m) above mean sea level.

It has one runway designated 7/25 with a turf surface measuring 3,000 by 75 feet (914 m × 23 m).

== See also ==
- List of airports in Montana
