= Lavina Airport =

- IATA: none; ICAO: none; FAA LID: 80S

Summary
- Airport type: Public
- Owner: State of Montana
- Serves: Lavina, Montana
- Elevation AMSL: 3,490 ft / 1,064 m
- Coordinates: 46°18′26″N 108°57′21″W

Map
- Location of airport in Montana

Runways
Direction	Length		Surface
Direction	ft	m	Surface
7/25	3,460	1,055	Turf

Statistics (2008)
- Aircraft operations: 375
- Source: Federal Aviation Administration

Lavina Airport (FAA LID: 80S) is a public use airport located two nautical miles (4 km) northwest of the central business district of Lavina, a town in Golden Valley County, Montana, United States. It is owned by the State of Montana.

== Facilities and aircraft ==
Lavina Airport covers an area of 52 acres (21 ha) at an elevation of 3,490 feet (1,064 m) above mean sea level. It has one runway designated 7/25 with a turf surface measuring 3,460 by 100 feet (1,055 x 30 m). For the 12-month period ending August 5, 2008, the airport had 375 general aviation aircraft operations, an average of 31 per month.

== See also ==
- List of airports in Montana
