= Belle Creek Airport =

- IATA: none; ICAO: none; FAA LID: 3V7

Summary
- Airport type: Public
- Owner: Powder River County
- Serves: Belle Creek, Montana
- Elevation AMSL: 3,678 ft (1,121 m)
- Coordinates: 45°07′39″N 105°05′32″W

Map
- Location of airport in Montana

Runways
Direction	Length		Surface
Direction	ft	m	Surface
8/26	3,770	1,149	Asphalt

Statistics (2006)
- Aircraft operations: 550
- Based aircraft: 4
- Source: Federal Aviation Administration

Belle Creek Airport (FAA LID: 3V7) is a county-owned, public-use airport in Powder River County, Montana, United States. It is located one nautical mile (2 km) northeast of Belle Creek.

As of August 15, 2014, the 3V7 FAA code is unknown in the FAA NASR system.

In the List of airports in Montana, it is listed as a notable former airport which closed circa 2009.

== Facilities and aircraft ==
Belle Creek Airport covers an area of 30 acres (12 ha) at an elevation of 3,678 feet (1,121 m) above mean sea level. It has one asphalt paved runway designated 8/26 which measures 3,770 by 50 feet (1,149 x 15 m).

For the 12-month period ending July 12, 2006, the airport had 550 general aviation aircraft operations, an average of 45 per month. At that time there were four aircraft based at this airport: three single-engine and one ultralight.

== See also ==
- List of airports in Montana
