= West Lolo Complex Fire =

2021 wildfire in Montana

West Lolo Complex
- Date: July 8, 2021 – present
- Location: Plains, Montana
- Coordinates: 47.41°N 114.988°W

Statistics
- Burned area: 39,053 acres (15,804 ha)

Ignition
- Cause: Lightning

Map
- Location in Western Montana

The West Lolo Complex is a large wildfire complex currently burning near Plains, Montana. The fires started on July 8 by lightning. Started by lightning strikes, the fires have collectively burned 39,053 acres (15,804 ha) and is 15% percent contained as of August 5, 2021.

== Events ==
=== July ===
The West Lolo Complex was first reported on July 8, 2021 at around 11:10 am MST.

=== Containment ===
As of August 20, 2021 the fire is 15% contained.
