= M35 =

M35, M.35 or M-35 may refer to:

== Military ==
- M35 series 2½-ton 6×6 cargo truck, a US Army truck
- HMS Dulverton (M35), a Royal Navy mine countermeasures vessel launched in 1982
- ADGZ or M35 Mittlere Panzerwagen, a 1930s Austrian Army heavy armored car
- Cannone da 47/32 M35, an Austrian artillery piece produced under license in Italy during World War II
- PRB M35 mine; see List of land mines
- Vollmer M35, a series of 1930s experimental automatic rifles developed by Heinrich Vollmer
- M35 Stahlhelm, a type of German World War II helmet
- M35 prime mover, a US Army artillery tractor based on the M10A1 tank destroyer
- M35 (tank gun) used on M10 Booker

== Science and technology ==
- Messier 35, an open star cluster
- M35 high-speed steel
- British NVC community M35, a mire community; see Mires in the British National Vegetation Classification system
- M35, a subgroup of Haplogroup M

== Transportation ==
=== Land ===
- Citroën M35, a French prototype car
- Infiniti M35, a Japanese luxury car
- M35 motorway (Hungary), a motorway
- M35 (Cape Town), a Metropolitan Route in Cape Town, South Africa
- M35 (Johannesburg), a Metropolitan Route in Johannesburg, South Africa
- M35 (Pretoria), a Metropolitan Route in Pretoria, South Africa
- M35 (Durban), a Metropolitan Route in Durban, South Africa
- M35 (New York City bus), a New York City Bus route in Manhattan, United States
- M-35 (Michigan highway), a state highway in Michigan, United States
- M35, station code of JA Hiroshimabyoin-mae Station, Hiroshima, Japan

=== Air ===
- Beech Model 35 Bonanza, an American general aviation aircraft
- BFW M.35, also known as the Messerschmitt M 35, a German sports plane of the early 1930s
- Miles M.35 Libellula, an experimental British aircraft of 1941
- M35, FAA location ID for Lindey's Landing West Seaplane Base, Montana, United States

== Other uses ==
- M35, a postcode for Failsworth, Greater Manchester, England
- M35, an Egyptian hieroglyph; see List of Egyptian hieroglyphs § M35
- Samsung Galaxy M35 5G, an Android-based smartphone
