= Wikoff =

Wikoff is a surname. Notable people with the surname include:

- Allen T. Wikoff (1825–1902), American Republican politician
- Bertha Berry (born Bertha Wikoff; 1876–1954), American nurse and hospital founder
- Charles A. Wikoff (1837–1898), the most senior ranking American Army officer killed in the Spanish–American War
- Henry Wikoff (1811–1884), American traveler and writer
- Lester B. Wikoff (1893–1978), American Colonel and Superintendent of Wentworth Military Academy
