= Dell Flight Strip =

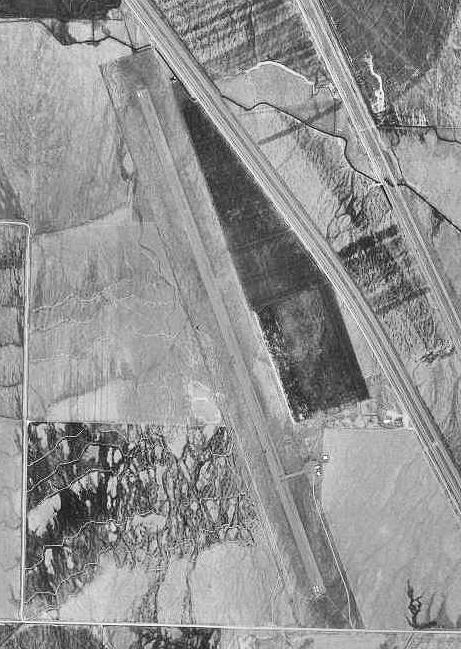
- USGS aerial image, 1995
- IATA: none; ICAO: none; FAA LID: 4U9

Summary
- Airport type: Public
- Owner: Montana DOT Aeronautics Division
- Serves: Dell, Montana
- Elevation AMSL: 6,007 ft (1,831 m)
- Coordinates: 44°44′09″N 112°43′12″W
- Interactive map of Dell Flight Strip

Runways
Direction	Length		Surface
Direction	ft	m	Surface
14/32	7,000	2,134	Asphalt

Statistics (2009)
- Aircraft operations: 950
- Source: Federal Aviation Administration

Dell Flight Strip (FAA LID: 4U9) is a public-use airport located one nautical mile (1.85 km) northwest of the central business district of Dell, in Beaverhead County, Montana, United States. It is owned by the Montana Department of Transportation Aeronautics Division and provides general aviation service.

== History ==
The airport was built by the United States Army Air Forces about 1942 as an emergency landing airfield for military aircraft on training flights. It was closed after World War II, and was turned over for local government use by the War Assets Administration (WAA).

In 1988, the airport "teetered on the verge of abandonment" until Leon Hirsch, an executive at United States Surgical Corporation, purchased a nearby ranch, and paid to upgrade the airport so he could land his Learjet.

== Facilities and aircraft ==
Dell Flight Strip covers an area of 147 acres (59 ha) at an elevation of 6,007 feet (1,831 m) above mean sea level. It has one runway designated 14/32 with an asphalt surface measuring 7,000 by 70 feet (2,134 x 21 m). For the 12-month period ending September 25, 2009, the airport had 950 general aviation aircraft operations, an average of 79 per month.

== See also ==
- List of airports in Montana
