= Stafford's Grocery =

- U.S. National Register of Historic Places
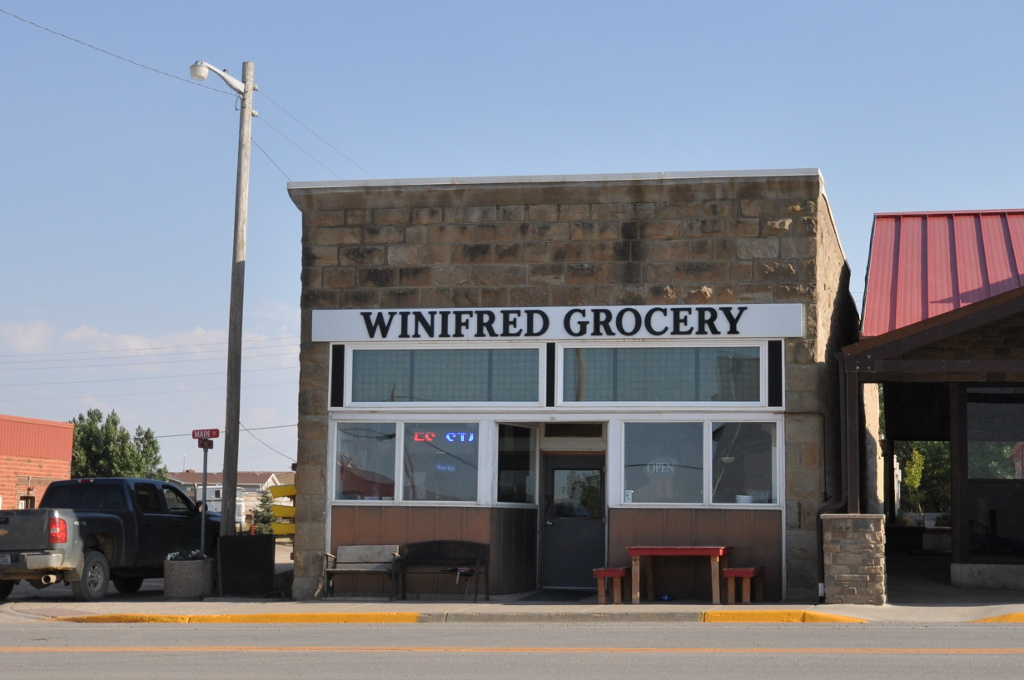

- Location within Montana Location within the United States
- Location: 201 Main St., Winifred, Montana
- Coordinates: 47°33′34″N 109°22′35″W
- Area: .08 acres (0.032 ha)
- Built: 1914
- Built by: John Reppe
- NRHP reference No.: 16000141
- Added to NRHP: April 5, 2016

Stafford's Grocery, at 201 Main St. in Winifred, Montana, was built in 1914. It was listed on the National Register of Historic Places in 2016.

It was deemed notable "as the only remaining building in Winifred constructed of native sandstone. It serves as a good example of a simple Western Commercial style building that retains its decorative elements including a projecting cornice along with a colored prism glass transom."
