= Condon USFS Airport =

Airport in Montana, United States

- IATA: none; ICAO: none; FAA LID: S04

Summary
- Airport type: Public
- Owner: United States Forest Service (USFS)
- Serves: Condon, Montana
- Elevation AMSL: 3,686 ft (1,123 m)
- Coordinates: 47°32′20″N 113°43′13″W
- Interactive map of Condon USFS Airport

Runways
Direction	Length		Surface
Direction	ft	m	Surface
13/31	2,575	785	Turf

Statistics (2008)
- Aircraft operations: 1,000
- Source: Federal Aviation Administration

Condon USFS Airport (FAA LID: S04) is a public use airport located one nautical mile (1.85 km) northwest of the central business district of Condon, in Missoula County, Montana, United States. It is owned by the United States Forest Service (USFS).

== Facilities and aircraft ==
Condon USFS Airport covers an area of 28 acres (11 ha) at an elevation of 3,686 feet (1,123 m) above mean sea level. It has one runway designated 13/31 with a turf surface measuring 2,575 by 135 feet (785 x 41 m). For the 12-month period ending July 21, 2008, the airport had 1,000 aircraft operations, an average of 83 per month: 80% general aviation and 20% air taxi.
