= Slayton Mercantile Co. =

- U.S. National Register of Historic Places
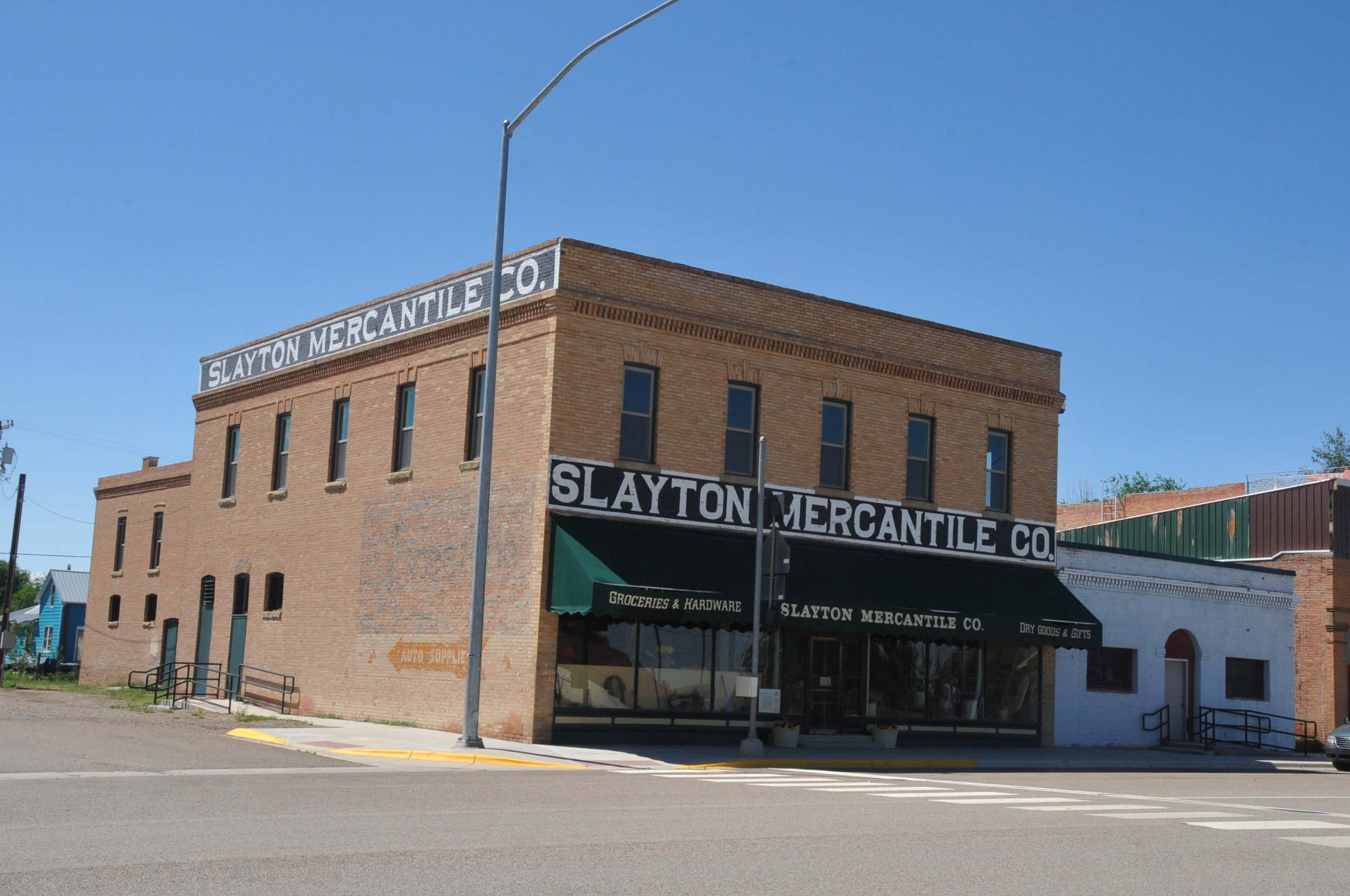

- Location within Montana Location within the United States
- Location: 23 Main St., Lavina, Montana
- Coordinates: 46°17′47″N 108°56′17″W
- Area: less than one acre
- Built: 1910
- Built by: Crow, Mr.
- Architectural style: Western Commercial
- NRHP reference No.: 00001567
- Added to NRHP: December 28, 2000

The Slayton Mercantile Co. is a site on the National Register of Historic Places located at Main and First Streets in Lavina, Montana. It was added to the Register on December 28, 2000.

It is a two part two-story brick building built in 1910. It was deemed to be "a good example of turn of the 20th century Western commercial architecture", with a horizontal division between first and second floors. Its main front portion is 59 by 46 feet (18 m × 14 m) in plan, and it has a lower rear portion that is 58 by 30 feet (17.7 m × 9.1 m) in plan.

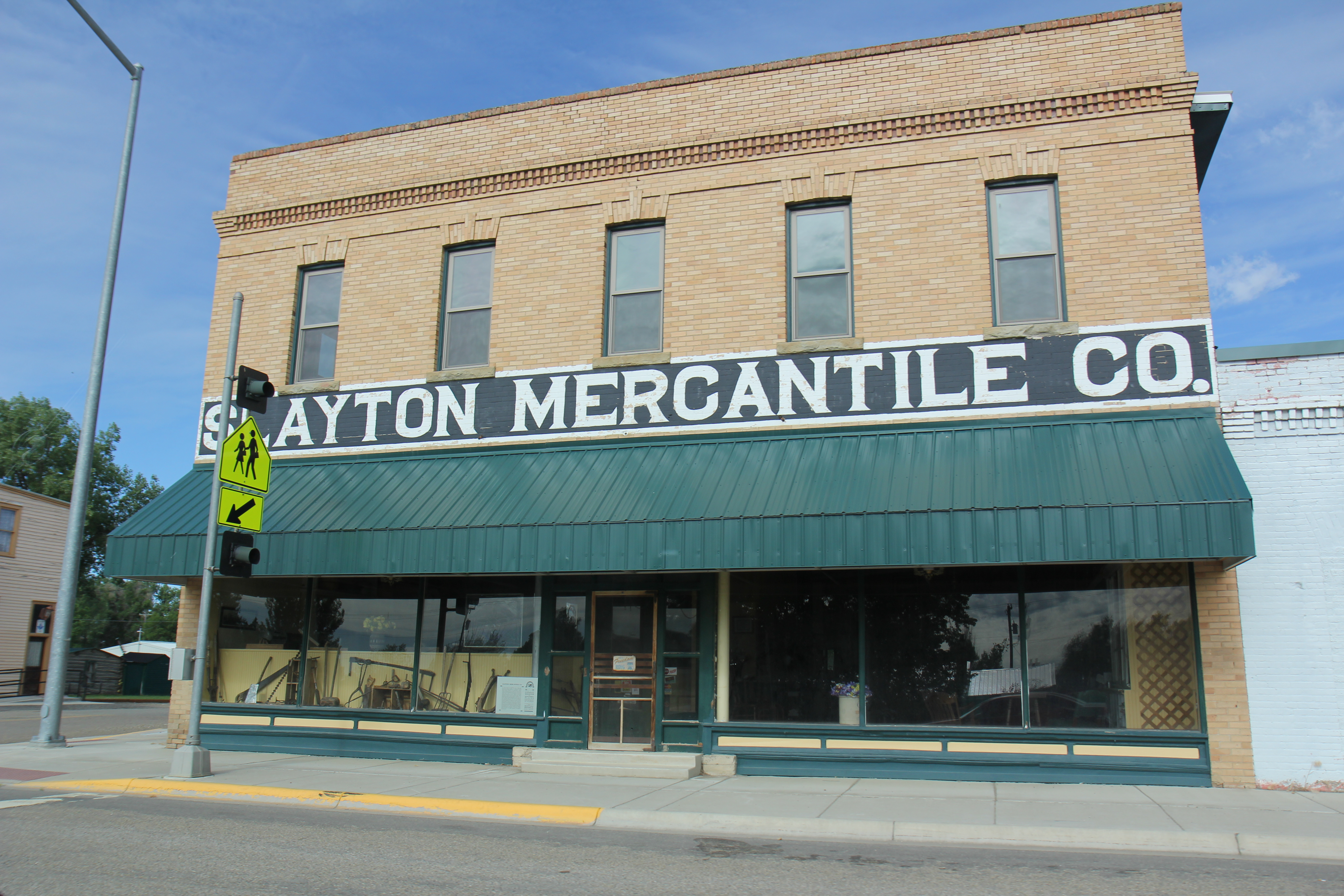
Front
