= First National Bank of Ekalaka and Rickard Hardware Store Building =

- U.S. National Register of Historic Places
- Location within Montana Location within the United States
- Location: 103 & 105 N. Main St., Ekalaka, Montana
- Coordinates: 45°53′25″N 104°32′54″W
- Area: less than one acre
- Built: 1940
- Built by: V.E. Figg
- Architect: V.E. Figg
- NRHP reference No.: 15000815
- Added to NRHP: November 19, 2015

The First National Bank of Ekalaka and Rickard Hardware Store Building, in Ekalaka, Montana, was built in 1940. In 2015 it became the first-listed historic site in Carter County to be listed on the National Register of Historic Places. Carter was the last of Montana's 56 counties to get one.

It was designed and built by contractor V.E. Figg. (1893–1984).

It is the only Streamline Moderne building in Ekalaka. It now serves as the town's town hall and public library.
