= Denton Airport =

- IATA: none; ICAO: none; FAA LID: 5U0

Summary
- Airport type: Public
- Owner: Town of Denton
- Serves: Denton, Montana
- Elevation AMSL: 3,594 ft (1,095 m)
- Coordinates: 47°19′15″N 109°56′31″W

Map
- Location of airport in Montana

Runways
Direction	Length		Surface
Direction	ft	m	Surface
9/27	2,550	777	Turf

Statistics (2011)
- Aircraft operations: 550
- Source: Federal Aviation Administration

Denton Airport (FAA LID: 5U0) is a town owned, public use airport located in Denton, a town in Fergus County, Montana, United States.

== Facilities and aircraft ==
Denton Airport resides at elevation of 3,594 feet (1,095 m) above mean sea level. It has one runway designated 9/27 with a turf surface measuring 2,550 by 180 feet (777 x 55 m). For the 12-month period ending July 20, 2011, the airport had 550 general aviation aircraft operations, an average of 45 per month.

== See also ==
- List of airports in Montana
