= Fairfield County Airport =

Fairfield County Airport may refer to:

- Fairfield County Airport (Ohio) in Lancaster, Ohio, United States (FAA: LHQ)
- Fairfield County Airport (South Carolina) in Winnsboro, South Carolina, United States (FAA: FDW)

== See also ==
- Fairfield Airport (disambiguation)
- Fairfield Municipal Airport (disambiguation)
