= Turner Airport =

Airport in Montana, United States

- IATA: none; ICAO: none; FAA LID: 9U0

Summary
- Airport type: Public
- Owner: Blaine County
- Serves: Turner, Montana
- Elevation AMSL: 3,049 ft (929 m)
- Coordinates: 48°51′01″N 108°24′09″W

Map
- Location of airport in Montana

Runways
Direction	Length		Surface
Direction	ft	m	Surface
7/25	3,612	1,101	Asphalt
10/28	2,190	668	Turf

Statistics (2012)
- Aircraft operations: 7,000
- Based aircraft: 14
- Source: Federal Aviation Administration

Turner Airport (FAA LID: 9U0) is a public use airport in Blaine County, Montana, United States. It is owned by Blaine County and located one nautical mile (2 km) northeast of the central business district of Turner, Montana. This airport is included in the National Plan of Integrated Airport Systems for 2011–2015, which categorized it as a general aviation facility.

== Facilities and aircraft ==
Turner Airport covers an area of 71 acres (29 ha) at an elevation of 3,049 feet (929 m) above mean sea level. It has two runways: 7/25 is 3,612 by 60 feet (1,101 x 18 m) with an asphalt surface and 10/28 is 2,190 by 90 feet (668 x 27 m) with a turf surface.

For the 12-month period ending July 19, 2012, the airport had 7,000 aircraft operations, an average of 19 per day: 97% general aviation and 3% air taxi. At that time there were 14 single-engine aircraft based at this airport.

== See also ==
- List of airports in Montana
