= Ekalaka Airport =

Airport in Ekalaka, Montana

Coordinates: 45°52′35″N 104°32′15″W

Ekalaka Airport (FAA LID: 97M) is a public use airport located in Ekalaka, Montana. In 2020, there were approximately 200 movements, with 88% being general aviation and 12% being air taxis. Ekalaka Airport hosts community events, including an annual fly-in, which features activities such as a flour drop competition, a barbecue, and a hangar dance.

== See also ==
- List of airports in Montana
