= Ferndale Airfield =

- IATA: none; ICAO: none; FAA LID: 53U

Summary
- Airport type: Public
- Owner: Flathead Municipal Airport Authority
- Serves: Bigfork, Montana
- Elevation AMSL: 3,072 ft (936 m)
- Coordinates: 48°03′38″N 114°00′04″W

Map
- Location of airport in Montana

Runways
Direction	Length		Surface
Direction	ft	m	Surface
15/33	3,500	1,067	Turf

Statistics (2005)
- Aircraft operations: 10,700
- Based aircraft: 36
- Source: Federal Aviation Administration

Ferndale Airfield (FAA LID: 53U) is a public use airport in Flathead County, Montana, United States. It is owned by the Flathead Municipal Airport Authority and located three nautical miles (6 km) northeast of the central business district of Bigfork, Montana.

== Facilities and aircraft ==
Ferndale Airfield covers an area of 35 acres (14 ha) at an elevation of 3,072 feet (936 m) above mean sea level. It has one runway designated 15/33 with a turf surface measuring 3,500 by 95 feet (1,067 x 29 m).

For the 12-month period ending August 24, 2005, the airport had 10,700 aircraft operations, an average of 29 per day: 99% general aviation and 1% air taxi. At that time there were 36 aircraft based at this airport: 97% single-engine and 3% glider.

== See also ==
- List of airports in Montana
