= Broadus Airport =

County airport in Power River County, Montana, U.S.

- IATA: BDX; ICAO: none; FAA LID: 00F

Summary
- Airport type: Public
- Owner: Powder River County
- Serves: Broadus, Montana
- Elevation AMSL: 3,280 ft (1,000 m)
- Coordinates: 45°28′14″N 105°27′26″W
- Interactive map of Broadus Airport

Runways
Direction	Length		Surface
Direction	ft	m	Surface
10/28	4,400	1,341	Asphalt

Statistics (2006)
- Aircraft operations: 5,350
- Source: Federal Aviation Administration

Broadus Airport (IATA: BDX, FAA LID: 00F) is a county-owned, public-use airport located three miles (4.8 km) northwest of the central business district of Broadus, a town in Powder River County, Montana, United States. This new airport was built at a cost of $2 million to replace the old Broadus Airport which is now closed.

The old airport, located approximately two miles (3.2 km) southeast of the new airport, was closed in 2005, and the new airport is 2 miles (3.2 km) northwest of Broadus, north of U.S. Highway 212, along Montana Highway 59.

== Facilities and aircraft ==
Broadus Airport covers an area of 160 acres (65 ha), and had one runway designated 10/28 with a 4,400 by 75 ft (1,341 by 23 m) asphalt surface. For the 12-month period ending July 11, 2006, the airport had 5,350 aircraft operations, an average of 14 per day: 98% general aviation and 2% air taxi.

== Old airport ==
The old Broadus Airport (IATA: BDX, ICAO: KBDX, FAA LID: BDX) was located at coordinates 45°25′59″N 105°25′01″W. It covered an area of 32 acres (13 ha) at an altitude of 3,034 feet (925 m) above mean sea level. The airport had one asphalt paved runway (11/29) measuring 3,150 by 50 ft (960 by 15 m).

== See also ==
- List of airports in Montana
