= Mission Field =

Airport in Montana, United States

- IATA: LVM; ICAO: KLVM; FAA LID: LVM

Summary
- Airport type: Public
- Owner: City of Livingston & Park County
- Serves: Livingston, Montana
- Elevation AMSL: 4,659 ft (1,420 m)
- Coordinates: 45°41′58″N 110°26′53″W
- Interactive map of Mission Field

Runways
Direction	Length		Surface
Direction	ft	m	Surface
4/22	5,701	1,738	Asphalt
8/26	3,762	1,147	Turf
13/31	2,724	830	Turf

Statistics (2009)
- Aircraft operations: 9,500
- Based aircraft: 22
- Source: Federal Aviation Administration

Mission Field (IATA: LVM, ICAO: KLVM, FAA LID: LVM) is a public use airport located five nautical miles (6 mi, 9 km) east of the central business district of Livingston, a city in Park County, Montana, United States. It is owned by the city and county. This airport is included in the National Plan of Integrated Airport Systems for 2011–2015, which categorized it as a general aviation facility.

== Facilities and aircraft ==
Mission Field covers an area of 689 acres (279 ha) at an elevation of 4,659 feet (1,420 m) above mean sea level. It has three runways: 4/22 is 5,701 by 75 feet (1,738 x 23 m) with an asphalt surface; 8/26 is 3,762 by 125 feet (1,147 x 38 m) with a turf surface; 13/31 is 2,724 by 120 feet (830 x 37 m) with a turf surface.

For the 12-month period ending September 11, 2009, the airport had 9,500 aircraft operations, an average of 26 per day: 79% general aviation, 11% air taxi, and 11% military. At that time there were 22 aircraft based at this airport: 68% single-engine, 14% multi-engine, 14% jet, and 5% ultralight.

== See also ==
- List of airports in Montana
