= Stevensville Airport =

Stevensville Municipal Airport
- IATA: none; ICAO: none; FAA LID: 32S

Summary
- Airport type: Public
- Owner: Town of Stevensville
- Serves: Stevensville, Montana
- Elevation AMSL: 3,610 ft / 1,100 m
- Coordinates: 46°31′30″N 114°03′10″W
- Interactive map of Stevensville Municipal Airport

Runways
Direction	Length		Surface
Direction	ft	m	Surface
12/30	3,800	1,158	Asphalt

Statistics (2009)
- Aircraft operations: 13,500
- Based aircraft: 78
- Source: Federal Aviation Administration

Stevensville Municipal Airport (FAA LID: 32S) is a town-owned public-use airport located two nautical miles (3.7 km) northeast of the central business district of Stevensville, a town in Ravalli County, Montana, United States. According to the FAA's National Plan of Integrated Airport Systems for 2009–2013, it is categorized as a general aviation facility.

== Facilities and aircraft ==
Stevensville Airport covers an area of 207 acres (84 ha) at an elevation of 3,610 feet (1,100 m) above mean sea level. It has one runway designated 12/30 with an asphalt surface measuring 3,800 by 60 feet (1,158 x 18 m).

For the 12-month period ending February 18, 2009, the airport had 13,500 aircraft operations, an average of 36 per day: 90% general aviation and 10% air taxi. At that time there were 78 aircraft based at this airport: 94% single-engine, 5% multi-engine and 1% helicopter.

== See also ==
- List of airports in Montana
