= Anna Scherlie Homestead Shack =

Historic house in Montana, United States

- U.S. National Register of Historic Places
- Location within Montana Location within the United States
- Location: Montana Highway 241, south of the Canada–US border, near Turner, Montana
- Coordinates: 48°51′01″N 108°23′26″W
- Area: 1.9 acres (0.77 ha)
- Built: 1913
- Architectural style: Prairie Homestead
- NRHP reference No.: 98001338
- Added to NRHP: November 5, 1998

The Anna Scherlie Homestead Shack is a site on the National Register of Historic Places located in Turner, Montana, United States. It was added to the Register on November 5, 1998.

A historic placard at the site reads:

The Enlarged Homestead Act of 1909 brought settlers to Montana and to this area called the Big Flat. Neil J. Scherlie was among the first to file a homestead claim and over the course of four years, three sisters and two brothers made claims nearby. Thirty-two-year-old Anna Scherlie arrived in 1913, becoming part of a long tradition of women homesteaders in Montana. In fact, in the four surrounding townships, women made up about one-fourth of the total homestead applicants. By 1916, Anna had forty acres planted in wheat, oats, and flax. Isolation on the Big Flat led many settlers to winter elsewhere and Anna followed suit. Legend has it that she went to St. Paul to work for the family of railroad magnate James J. Hill. Over the decades, Anna made few changes to her small wood frame shack, adding only a vestibule for use as a summer kitchen, a storage shed, and laundry. Droughts, depression, and two world wars passed. Anna remained here long after her neighbors had built modern homes, insisting that she was "too old for modern conveniences." The Spartan lifestyle seems to have been Anna's preference. When she died in 1973, an estate of more than $100,000 was divided among eighteen nieces and nephews; her ashes were scattered beneath a lilac bush on the property. Leon and Nellie Cederburg purchased the homestead when its seasoned resident moved to Havre in 1968. Rather than return the site to crop land, the Cederbergs maintain the homestead exactly as Anna left it.

The homestead building is a 14.5 by 14.5 feet (4.4 m × 4.4 m) woodframe building with a gable roof.
