= Kalispell City Airport =

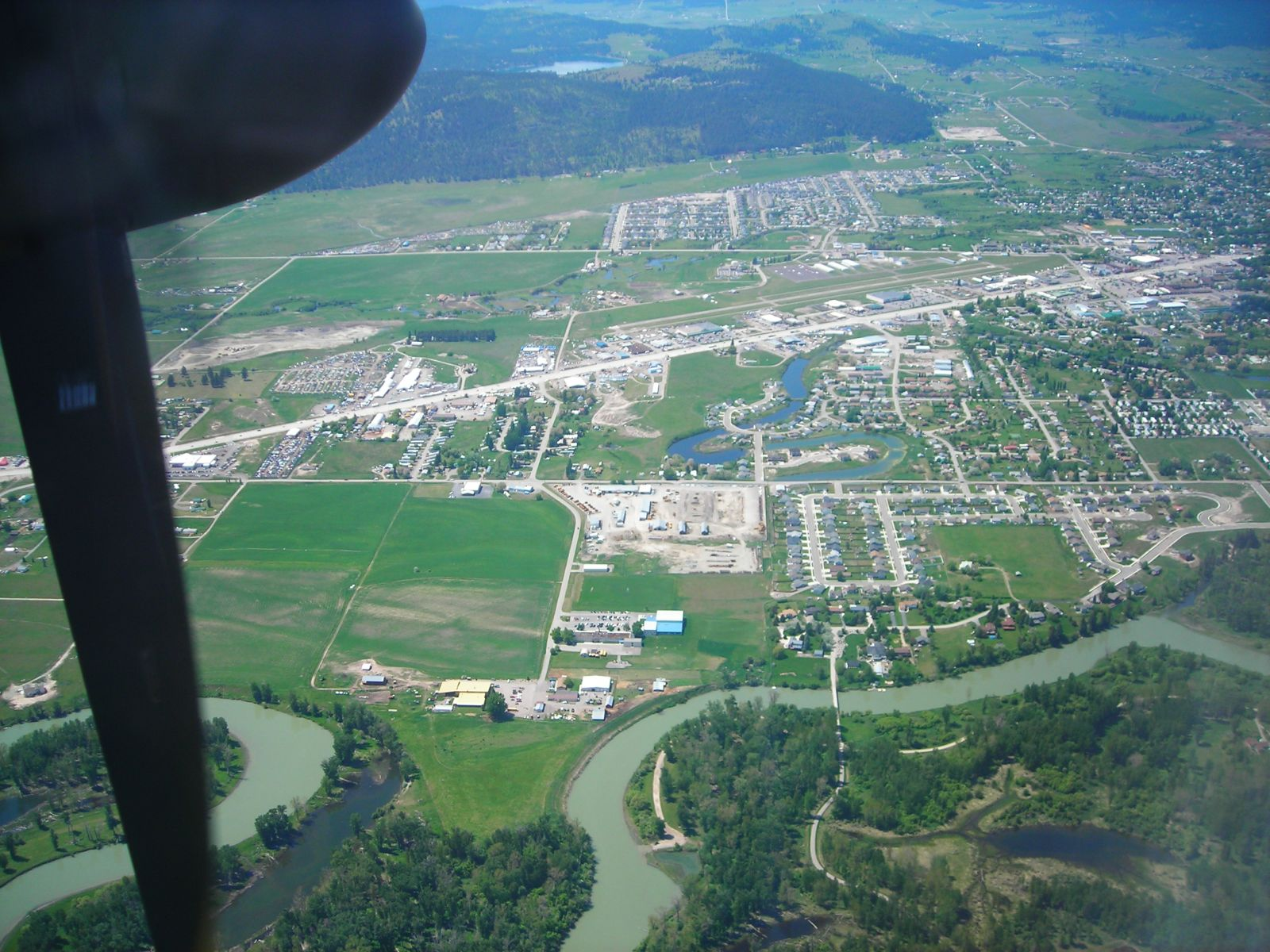
- As seen on final approach to nearby Glacier Park International Airport
- IATA: none; ICAO: none; FAA LID: S27

Summary
- Airport type: Public
- Owner: City of Kalispell
- Operator: City of Kalispell
- Serves: Kalispell, Montana
- Elevation AMSL: 2,932 ft (894 m)
- Coordinates: 48°10′43″N 114°18′13″W
- Website: www.kalispell.com/202/airport/
- Interactive map of Kalispell City Airport

Runways
Direction	Length		Surface
Direction	ft	m	Surface
13/31	3,600	1,097	Asphalt

Statistics (2005)
- Aircraft operations: 41,400
- Based aircraft: 74
- Source: Federal Aviation Administration

Kalispell City Airport (FAA LID: S27) is a city-owned public-use airport located one nautical mile (1.85 km) south of the central business district of Kalispell, a city in Flathead County, Montana, United States. This airport is included in the FAA's National Plan of Integrated Airport Systems for 2009–2013, which categorized it as a general aviation facility.

== Facilities and aircraft ==
Kalispell City Airport covers an area of 134 acres (54 ha) at an elevation of 2,932 feet (894 m) above mean sea level. It has one runway designated 13/31 with an asphalt surface measuring 3,600 by 60 feet (1,097 x 18 m).

For the 12-month period ending August 25, 2005, the airport had 41,400 aircraft operations, an average of 113 per day: 80% general aviation, 16% air taxi, and 5% military. At that time there were 68 aircraft based at this airport: 82% single-engine, 6% multi-engine, 10% helicopter and 2% ultralight.

== See also ==
- List of airports in Montana
