= Babb Airport =

- IATA: none; ICAO: none; FAA LID: 49S

Summary
- Airport type: Public
- Owner: Blackfeet Nation
- Serves: Babb, Montana
- Elevation AMSL: 4,518 ft (1,377 m)
- Coordinates: 48°50′54″N 113°25′45″W

Map
- Location of airport in Montana

Runways
Direction	Length		Surface
Direction	ft	m	Surface
14/32	3,860	1,177	Turf

Statistics (2009)
- Aircraft operations: 250
- Source: Federal Aviation Administration

Babb Airport (FAA LID: 49S) is a public use airport in Glacier County, Montana, United States. It is owned by the Blackfeet Nation and located one nautical mile (2 km) southeast of the central business district of Babb, Montana, a community on the Blackfeet Indian Reservation.

== Facilities and aircraft ==
Babb Airport covers an area of 91 acres (37 ha) at an elevation of 4,518 feet (1,377 m) above mean sea level. It has one runway designated 14/32 with a turf surface measuring 3,860 by 110 feet (1,177 x 34 m).

For the 12-month period ending September 15, 2009, the airport had 250 aircraft operations, an average of 20 per month: 80% general aviation and 20% air taxi.

== See also ==
- List of airports in Montana
