= Adams Hotel =

- U.S. National Register of Historic Places
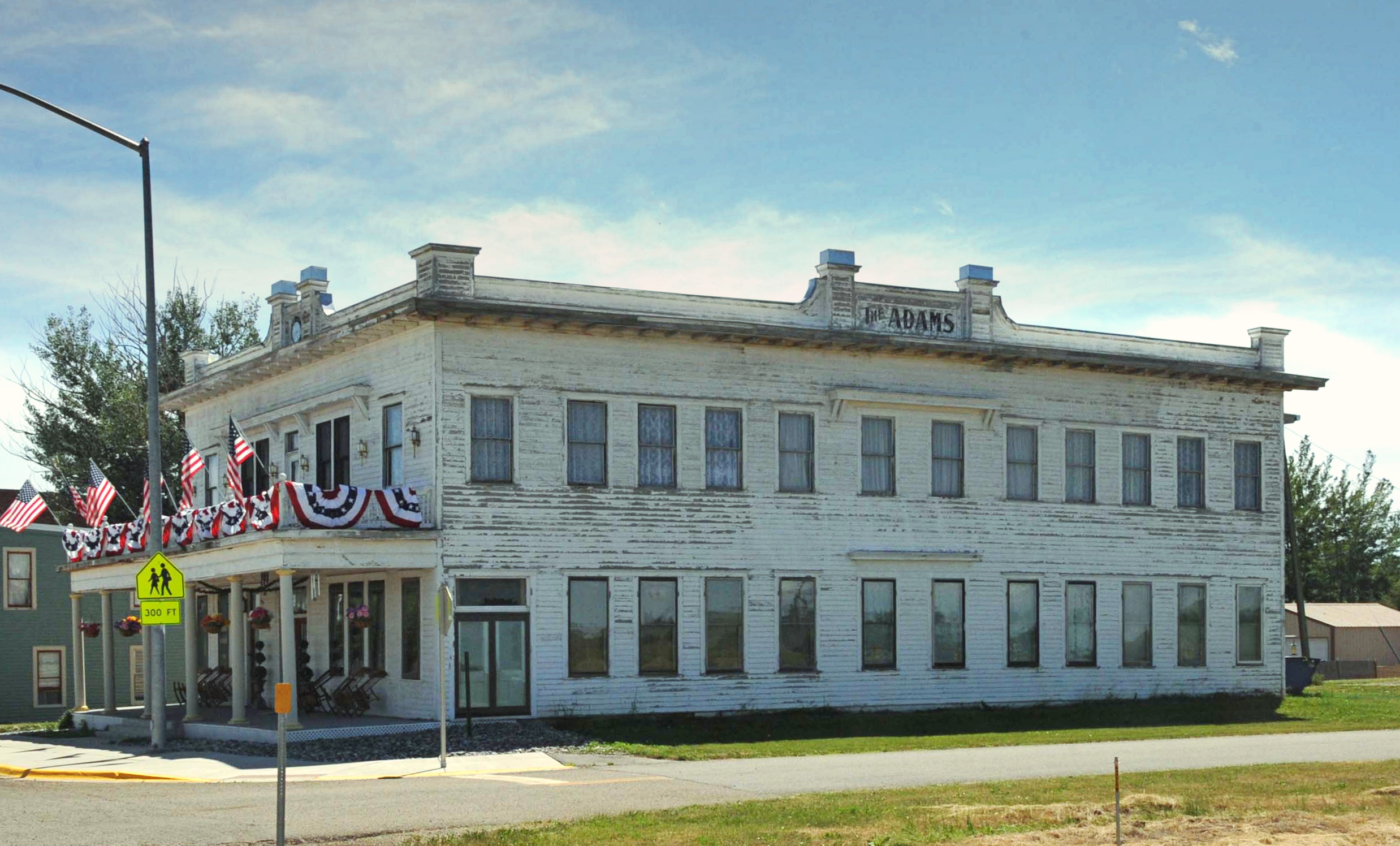

- Location within Montana Location within the United States
- Location: 1 Main St., Lavina, Montana
- Coordinates: 46°17′43″N 108°56′16″W
- Area: less than one acre
- Built: 1908
- Architect: Link & Haire
- Architectural style: Colonial Revival
- NRHP reference No.: 05001377
- Added to NRHP: December 6, 2005

The Adams Hotel is a site on the National Register of Historic Places located in Lavina, Montana. It was added to the Register on December 6, 2005. It has also been known as Lehfeldt Hotel and as Lavina Lutheran Church. The 22-room hotel was one of the finest in the area, boasting linen sheets and down comforters.

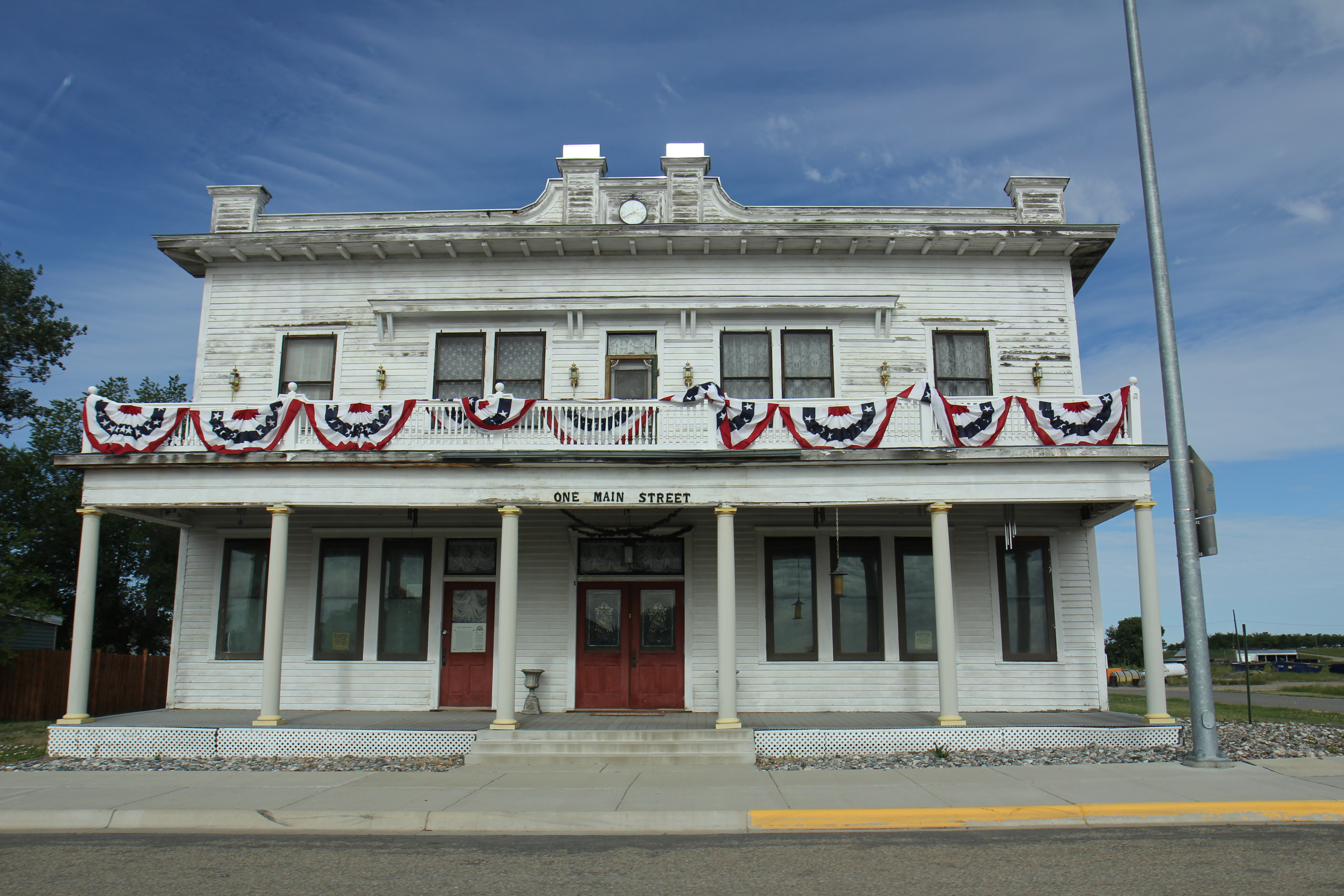
Front in 2016

The building is a two-story, wood-frame structure on a sandstone foundation, built with Colonial Revival styling. It is trapezoidal in plan, to create the illusion that it is parallel to the nearby railroad. It has a shed roof with a parapet wall around the south, east, and north sides. Two of these walls have pairs of decorative towers which frame the hotel's painted signboards.
