= Boulder Airport =

- IATA: none; ICAO: none; FAA LID: 3U9

Summary
- Airport type: Public
- Owner: Town of Boulder & Jefferson County
- Serves: Boulder, Montana
- Elevation AMSL: 4,968 ft (1,514 m)
- Coordinates: 46°12′42″N 112°06′21″W
- Interactive map of Boulder Airport

Runways
Direction	Length		Surface
Direction	ft	m	Surface
11/29	3,675	1,120	Turf

Statistics (2007)
- Aircraft operations: 600
- Source: Federal Aviation Administration

Boulder Airport (FAA LID: 3U9) is a public airport located two miles (3 km) south of Boulder's central business district. Boulder is a town in Jefferson County, Montana, United States. It is owned by the Town of Boulder and Jefferson County.

== Facilities and aircraft ==
Boulder Airport spans 32 acres (13 ha) and features a single runway designated 11/29. The runway has a turf surface measuring 3,675 by 72 feet (1,120 by 22 m). During the 12-month period ending on August 13, 2007, the airport recorded 600 general aviation aircraft operations, averaging 50 per month.

== See also ==
- List of airports in Montana
