= Mission Mountain School =

Defunct therapeutic boarding school in Condon, Missoula County, Montana, United States

Coordinates: 47°30′22″N 113°42′30″W

Information
- Established: 1990
- Closed: 2008
- Gender: Girls
- Age: 13 to 18

Mission Mountain School was a therapeutic boarding school for girls located in Condon, Missoula County, Montana. It operated from October 1, 1990, to August 16, 2008. On that date, the school graduated its last class and ceased operation, announcing that its founders would be on sabbatical.

== Program description ==
The school enrolled girls ages 13 to 18, offering therapy, college preparatory education, and recreation for girls of above average intelligence who were "in crisis." It operated year-round and the average length of enrollment was 18 to 22 months. The curriculum was divided into four program components: daily life skills, outdoor recreation, emotional growth and academics. An equine-guided education program was offered.

A graduate of the program stated that the school used behavior modification to give students structure and provided psychoanalytic counseling to help students understand the sources of their negative behaviors.

== Controversy ==
The appropriateness of practices at the school have been disputed. One alumnus testified before Congress regarding abusive practices, exploitative interventions, educational neglect and the lack of mental health training of staff. One psychiatrist who also testified before Congress noted his own horror at the accounts of 'blatant abuse in the name of treatment and therapy' at the school and other poorly regulated therapeutic boarding schools.

Yet another former participant has said that the program induced students into "self-obliterating submission" by instilling fear.

== Accreditation and affiliations ==
Mission Mountain School operated as an accredited member of the Pacific Northwest Association of Independent Schools (PNAIS) and the Northwest Association of Accredited Schools (NAAS), and was a full member of the National Association of Therapeutic Schools and Programs (NATSAP). It was also affiliated with the Equine Assisted Growth and Learning Association (EAGALA).
