= Ravalli County Airport =

- IATA: none; ICAO: none; FAA LID: HRF

Summary
- Airport type: Public
- Owner: Ravalli County
- Serves: Hamilton, Montana
- Elevation AMSL: 3,636 ft / 1,108 m
- Coordinates: 46°15′05″N 114°07′32″W

Map
- Location of airport in Montana

Runways
Direction	Length		Surface
Direction	ft	m	Surface
17/35	5,200	1,585	Asphalt

Statistics (2019)
- Aircraft operations: 23,600
- Based aircraft: 98
- Source: Federal Aviation Administration

Ravalli County Airport (FAA LID: HRF) is a public use airport in Ravalli County, Montana, United States. It is owned by Ravalli County and located one nautical mile (2 km) east of the central business district of Hamilton, Montana. This airport is included in the National Plan of Integrated Airport Systems for 2011–2015, which categorized it as a general aviation facility.

== Facilities and aircraft ==
Ravalli County Airport covers an area of 439 acres (178 ha) at an elevation of 3,636 feet (1,108 m) above mean sea level. It has one asphalt runway designated 17/35, measuring 5,200 by 75 feet (1,585 x 23 m).

For the 12-month period ending June 26, 2019, the airport had 23,600 aircraft operations, an average of approximately 64 per day: 92% general aviation and 8% air taxi. At that time there were 98 aircraft based at this airport: 80% single-engine, 9.2% multi-engine, 2% glider, 7% helicopter, and 2% jet.

Choice Aviation, the airport's fixed-base operator (FBO), offers fuel, flight instruction, aircraft/hangar rental, and other services including backcountry flights into the Selway Wilderness areas.

406 Airframes Inc. provides aircraft structural repair and modifications.

== See also ==
- List of airports in Montana
