= Lavina State Bank =

- U.S. National Register of Historic Places
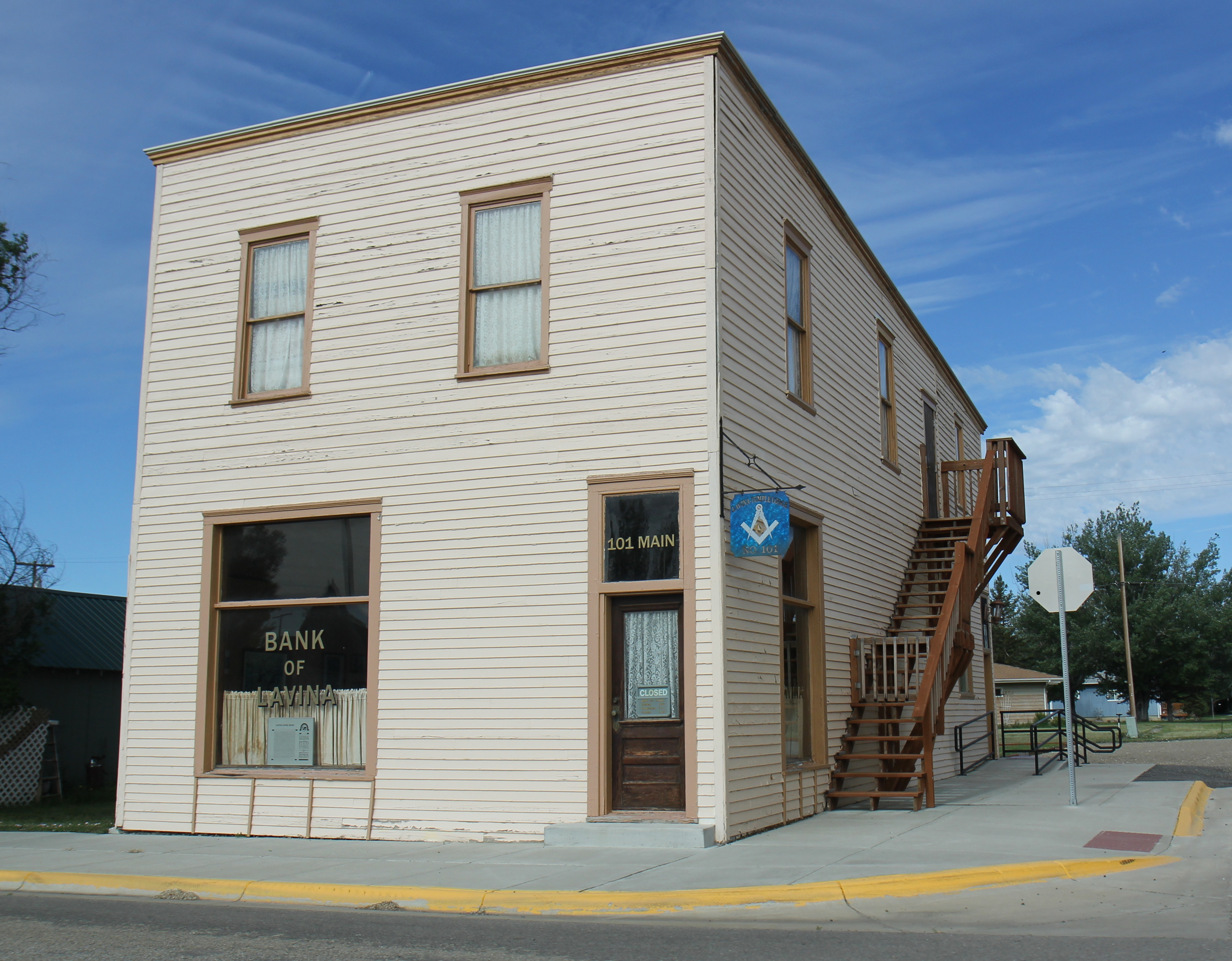

- Location within Montana Location within the United States
- Location: 101 Main St., lavina, Montana
- Coordinates: 46°17′40″N 108°56′15″W
- Area: less than one acre
- Built: 1908
- Architectural style: Western Commercial
- NRHP reference No.: 07001293
- Added to NRHP: December 17, 2007

The Lavina State Bank is a site on the National Register of Historic Places located in Lavina, Montana. It has also been known as Bank of Lavina, as Lavina Post Office, and as Lavina Temple Lodge #101. It was added to the Register on December 17, 2007.

It is a two-story wood-frame building on a concrete foundation, built in 1908 to serve as the Bank of Lavina's building. The bank became the Lavina State Bank in 1911 and "served as the financial center of the town and surrounding communities" only to fail in the drought and depression of the 1920s, like hundreds of other small banks in Montana. It later served as a post office and as the Lavina Masonic Lodge.
