= Plains Airport =

- IATA: none; ICAO: none; FAA LID: S34

Summary
- Airport type: Public
- Owner: Sanders County
- Serves: Plains, Montana
- Elevation AMSL: 2,467 ft / 752 m
- Coordinates: 47°28′25″N 114°54′26″W
- Interactive map of Plains Airport

Runways
Direction	Length		Surface
Direction	ft	m	Surface
13/31	4,650	1,417	Asphalt

Statistics (2008)
- Aircraft operations: 3,900
- Based aircraft: 3
- Source: Federal Aviation Administration

Plains Airport (FAA LID: S34) is a county-owned public-use airport located one nautical mile (1.85 km) northwest of the central business district of Plains, in Sanders County, Montana, United States. According to the FAA's National Plan of Integrated Airport Systems for 2009–2013, it is categorized as a general aviation facility.

== Facilities and aircraft ==
Plains Airport covers an area of 259 acres (105 ha) at an elevation of 2,467 feet (752 m) above mean sea level. It has one runway designated 13/31 with an asphalt surface measuring 4,650 by 75 feet (1,417 x 23 m).

For the 12-month period ending July 22, 2008, the airport had 3,900 general aviation aircraft operations, an average of 10 per day. At that time there were 3 aircraft based at this airport, all single-engine.

== See also ==
- List of airports in Montana
