= Bowman Field (Montana) =

Public airport serving Anaconda, Montana, USA

- IATA: none; ICAO: none; FAA LID: 3U3

Summary
- Airport type: Public
- Owner: Anaconda City & Deer Lodge County
- Serves: Anaconda, Montana
- Elevation AMSL: 5,034 ft (1,534 m)
- Coordinates: 46°09′11″N 112°52′04″W
- Interactive map of Bowman Field

Runways
Direction	Length		Surface
Direction	ft	m	Surface
17/35	6,011	1,832	Asphalt
4/22	4,515	1,376	Asphalt

Statistics (2008)
- Aircraft operations: 4,900
- Source: Federal Aviation Administration

Bowman Field (FAA LID: 3U3) is a public airport located three miles (5 km) northeast of the central business district of Anaconda, a city in Deer Lodge County, Montana, United States. It is owned by Anaconda City and Deer Lodge County.

== Facilities and aircraft ==
Bowman Field covers an area of 290 acres (120 ha) and has two asphalt paved runways: 17/35 measures 6,011 by 75 feet (1,832 by 23 m) and 4/22 measures 4,515 by 60 feet (1,376 by 18 m). For the 12-month period ending September 6, 2008, the airport had 4,900 aircraft operations, an average of 13 per day: 94% general aviation and 6% air taxi.

== See also ==
- List of airports in Montana
