= Dell, Montana =

Unincorporated community in Montana, United States

- Census-designated place
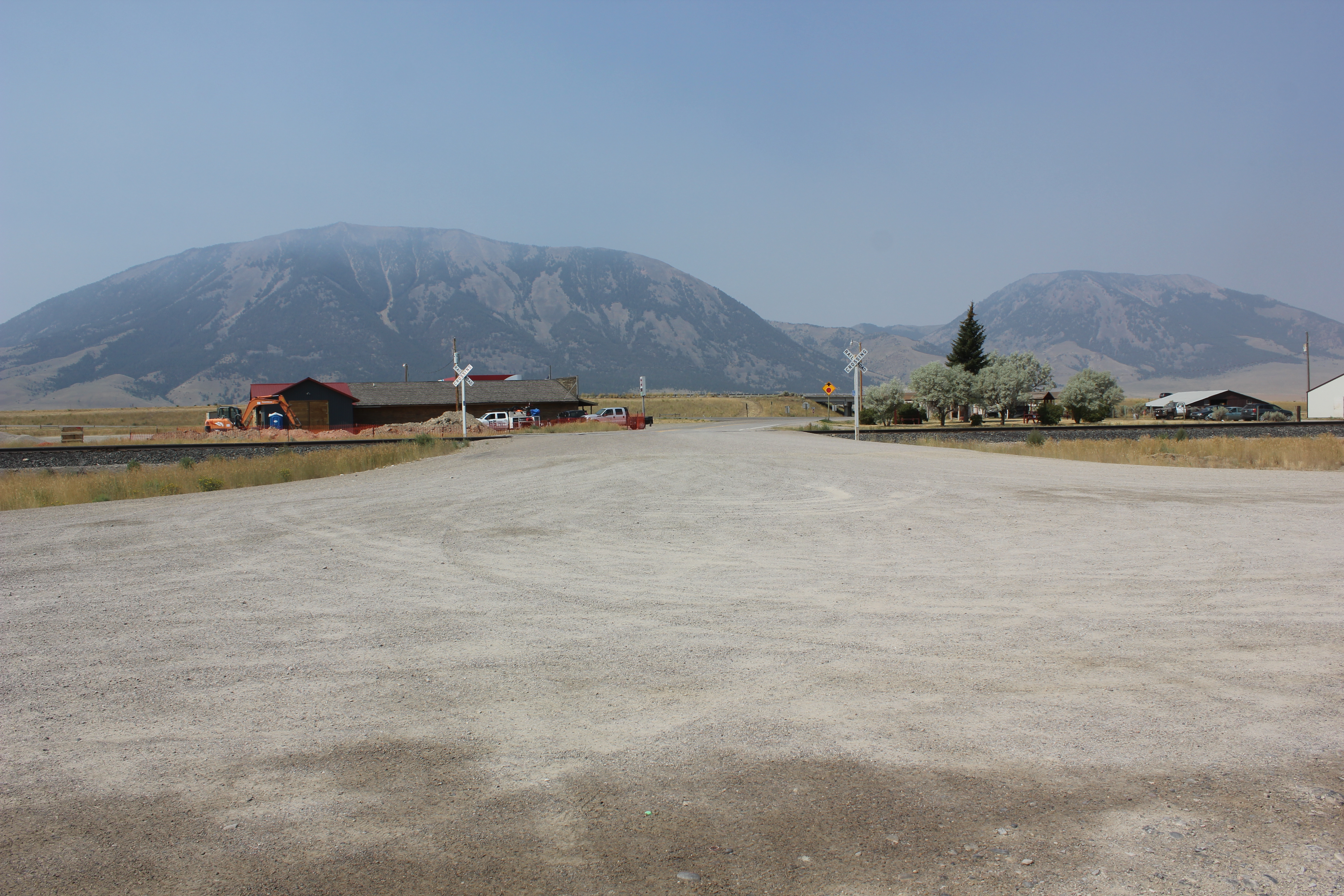

- Location within Montana Location within the United States
- Coordinates: 44°43′36″N 112°41′49″W
- Country: United States
- State: Montana
- County: Beaverhead

Area
  - Total: 0.45 sq mi (1.16 km^{2})
  - Land: 0.45 sq mi (1.16 km^{2})
  - Water: 0 sq mi (0.00 km^{2})
- Elevation: 6,004 ft (1,830 m)

Population (2020)
  - Total: 17
  - Density: 38.0/sq mi (14.69/km^{2})
- Time zone: UTC-7 (MST)
- ZIP code: 59724
- GNIS feature ID: 2804243

Dell is a census-designated place in Beaverhead County, Montana, United States. As of the 2020 census, Dell had a population of 17. The settlement is located in a valley beside the Red Rock River.

== History ==
Dell was founded as a station stop on the newly completed Utah and Northern Railway, which reached Butte in 1881. It became a trading center for ranchers.

Dell School opened in 1903, and was later converted to a restaurant. In 1907, the Dell Telephone Company was founded to construct and maintain a telephone system to Sheep Creek Basin.

== Geography ==
Dell is noted for having the lightest precipitation in Montana.

=== Climate ===
According to the Köppen Climate Classification system, Dell has a semi-arid climate, abbreviated "BSk" on climate maps.

== Demographics ==
Historical population
Census	Pop.	Note	%±
2020	17		—
U.S. Decennial Census

The population was 17 at the 2020 United States census.

== Infrastructure ==
Dell Flight Strip is located northwest of Dell. Dell has a post office.

== See also ==
- List of census-designated places in Montana
