= Ekalaka, Montana =

- Town
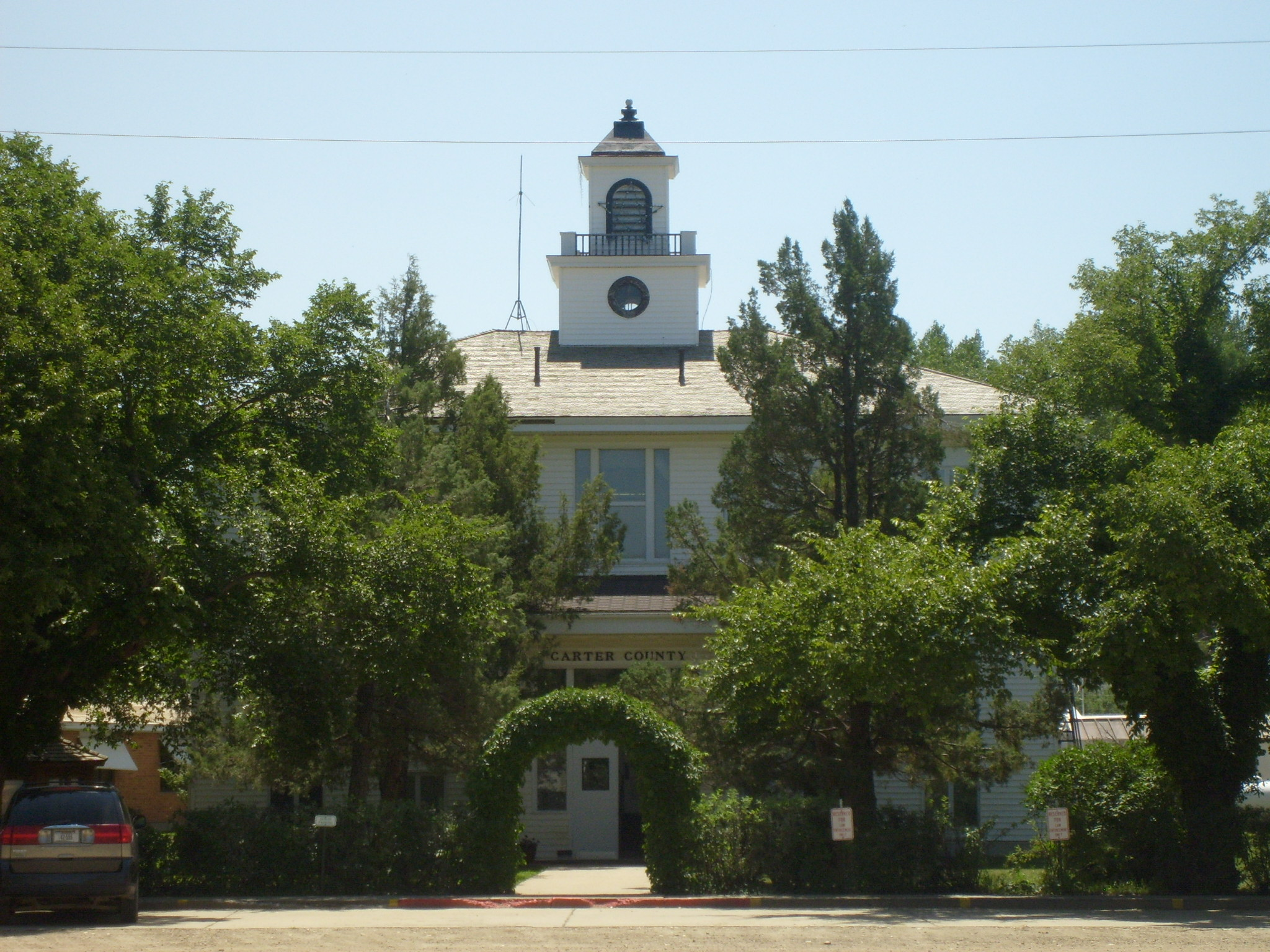
- Carter County Courthouse

- Seal

- Location of Ekalaka, Montana
- Coordinates: 45°53′23″N 104°33′02″W
- Country: United States
- State: Montana
- County: Carter

Area
  - Total: 1.03 sq mi (2.67 km^{2})
  - Land: 1.03 sq mi (2.67 km^{2})
  - Water: 0 sq mi (0.00 km^{2})
- Elevation: 3,425 ft (1,044 m)

Population (2020)
  - Total: 399
  - Density: 387.6/sq mi (149.64/km^{2})
- Time zone: UTC-7 (Mountain (MST))
  - Summer (DST): UTC-6 (MDT)
- ZIP code: 59324
- Area code: 406
- FIPS code: 30-23650
- GNIS feature ID: 2412470
- Website: ekalaka.gov

Ekalaka is a town in and the county seat of Carter County, Montana, United States. The population was 399 at the 2020 census.

== History ==
Ekalaka was named after a Sioux girl, Ijkalaka, who was the wife of David Harrison Russell, a scout.

Ijkalaka (Restless or Moving About) was an Oglala Lakota and the daughter of Wombalee We-chosh (Eagle Man). She was born in 1858 on the Powder River, while she was living with a cousin, Hi Kelly, at a ranch on Chugwater Creek, near Laramie, Wyoming. She was 16 when she met Russell, who was a scout and frontiersman.

The town was created by Russell on the edge of his ranch. A man named Carter bogged down in mud the spring of 1885 opened a saloon and is credited with saying "Anyplace in Montana is a good place to open a saloon". The site became a trade center for cattle ranchers and sheepherders. He put up houses to house freight workers and hunters who ran the local freight line (team and horses), and others added to it.

== Geography ==
According to the United States Census Bureau, the town has a total area of 1.04 square miles (2.69 km^{2}), all land. The area is known for its sandstone rock and open plains. Nearby is the Custer National Forest. Russell Creek flows through town.

=== Climate ===
Ekalaka experiences a dry continental climate (Köppen Dfb) with cold, dry winters and hot, wetter summers.

Climate data for Ekalaka, Montana, 1991–2020 normals, extremes 1896–present
Month	Jan	Feb	Mar	Apr	May	Jun	Jul	Aug	Sep	Oct	Nov	Dec	Year
Record high °F (°C)	65 (18)	66 (19)	83 (28)	90 (32)	98 (37)	105 (41)	108 (42)	108 (42)	103 (39)	92 (33)	78 (26)	67 (19)	108 (42)
Mean maximum °F (°C)	51.6 (10.9)	53.8 (12.1)	66.9 (19.4)	75.9 (24.4)	82.9 (28.3)	90.4 (32.4)	96.3 (35.7)	94.8 (34.9)	90.8 (32.7)	79.0 (26.1)	64.3 (17.9)	52.8 (11.6)	98.0 (36.7)
Mean daily maximum °F (°C)	32.5 (0.3)	35.0 (1.7)	46.4 (8.0)	56.8 (13.8)	66.8 (19.3)	76.5 (24.7)	85.6 (29.8)	84.7 (29.3)	74.5 (23.6)	58.4 (14.7)	44.0 (6.7)	34.3 (1.3)	58.0 (14.4)
Daily mean °F (°C)	21.6 (−5.8)	24.0 (−4.4)	34.1 (1.2)	43.7 (6.5)	53.6 (12.0)	63.2 (17.3)	71.2 (21.8)	70.0 (21.1)	60.0 (15.6)	45.8 (7.7)	32.8 (0.4)	23.6 (−4.7)	45.3 (7.4)
Mean daily minimum °F (°C)	10.8 (−11.8)	13.1 (−10.5)	21.8 (−5.7)	30.7 (−0.7)	40.4 (4.7)	49.9 (9.9)	56.8 (13.8)	55.3 (12.9)	45.6 (7.6)	33.2 (0.7)	21.5 (−5.8)	12.9 (−10.6)	32.7 (0.4)
Mean minimum °F (°C)	−17.3 (−27.4)	−11.6 (−24.2)	−3.4 (−19.7)	12.6 (−10.8)	24.3 (−4.3)	36.8 (2.7)	44.5 (6.9)	40.2 (4.6)	29.4 (−1.4)	12.8 (−10.7)	−2.4 (−19.1)	−13.3 (−25.2)	−24.1 (−31.2)
Record low °F (°C)	−44 (−42)	−43 (−42)	−32 (−36)	−11 (−24)	8 (−13)	27 (−3)	30 (−1)	26 (−3)	13 (−11)	−15 (−26)	−30 (−34)	−43 (−42)	−44 (−42)
Average precipitation inches (mm)	0.58 (15)	0.66 (17)	0.95 (24)	1.86 (47)	3.21 (82)	2.95 (75)	2.10 (53)	1.35 (34)	1.60 (41)	1.58 (40)	0.76 (19)	0.51 (13)	18.11 (460)
Average snowfall inches (cm)	6.5 (17)	9.0 (23)	8.8 (22)	5.3 (13)	2.6 (6.6)	0.0 (0.0)	0.0 (0.0)	0.0 (0.0)	0.1 (0.25)	2.4 (6.1)	6.2 (16)	7.5 (19)	48.4 (122.95)
Average precipitation days (≥ 0.01 in)	7.4	7.2	7.4	8.4	11.3	10.7	7.9	6.7	6.5	8.0	6.7	7.1	95.3
Average snowy days (≥ 0.1 in)	6.6	6.8	4.9	2.2	0.7	0.0	0.0	0.0	0.1	1.6	4.4	6.7	34.0
Source 1: NOAA
Source 2: National Weather Service

== Demographics ==
Historical population
Census	Pop.	Note	%±
1920	433		—
1930	475		9.7%
1940	719		51.4%
1950	904		25.7%
1960	738		−18.4%
1970	663		−10.2%
1980	620		−6.5%
1990	439		−29.2%
2000	410		−6.6%
2010	332		−19.0%
2020	399		20.2%
U.S. Decennial Census

=== 2010 census ===
At the 2010 census, there were 332 people, 176 households and 87 families residing in the town. The population density was 319.2 inhabitants per square mile (123.2/km^{2}). There were 266 housing units at an average density of 255.8 per square mile (98.8/km^{2}). The racial makeup of the town was 96.4% White, 1.2% Native American, 0.3% from other races, and 2.1% from two or more races. Hispanic or Latino of any race were 1.2% of the population.

There were 176 households, of which 17.0% had children under the age of 18 living with them, 39.8% were married couples living together, 6.8% had a female householder with no husband present, 2.8% had a male householder with no wife present, and 50.6% were non-families. 45.5% of all households were made up of individuals, and 22.8% had someone living alone who was 65 years of age or older. The average household size was 1.82 and the average family size was 2.52.

The median age was 54 years. 15.1% of residents were under the age of 18; 6.8% were between the ages of 18 and 24; 12.3% were from 25 to 44; 34.2% were from 45 to 64; and 31.3% were 65 years of age or older. The gender makeup of the town was 47.0% male and 53.0% female.

=== 2000 census ===
At the 2000 census, there were 410 people, 195 households and 109 families residing in the town. The population density was 391.5 inhabitants per square mile (151.2/km^{2}). There were 287 housing units at an average density of 274.1 per square mile (105.8/km^{2}). The racial makeup of the town was 99.02% White, 0.49% Native American, and 0.49% from two or more races. Hispanic or Latino of any race were 0.49% of the population.

There were 195 households, of which 21.5% had children under the age of 18 living with them, 44.6% were married couples living together, 8.7% had a female householder with no husband present, and 43.6% were non-families. 42.1% of all households were made up of individuals, and 25.6% had someone living alone who was 65 years of age or older. The average household size was 2.02 and the average family size was 2.73.

21.7% of the population were under the age of 18, 2.4% from 18 to 24, 21.7% from 25 to 44, 24.1% from 45 to 64, and 30.0% who were 65 years of age or older. The median age was 49 years. For every 100 females there were 85.5 males. For every 100 females age 18 and over, there were 80.3 males.

The median household income was $19,432 and the median family income was $27,750. Males had a median income of $22,656 and females $18,125. The per capita income $13,667. About 7.1% of families and 12.2% of the population were below the poverty line, including 8.5% of those under age 18 and 15.0% of those age 65 or over.

== Arts and culture ==
Ekalaka is part of the Montana Dinosaur Trail and is home to the Carter County Museum, which is known for its dinosaur collection. The prehistoric bird Magnusavis ekalakaensis was named after the town.

Medicine Rocks State Park is 11 miles (18 km) north of town. These sandstone pillars some 60 to 80 feet (18 to 24 m) high contain numerous examples of Native American rock art. There are more than 100 of the rocks and spires.

Ekalaka Public Library serves the town. It, and the town hall, are located in the First National Bank of Ekalaka and Rickard Hardware Store Building.

== Government ==
The town has a mayor and four city councilors. In November 2025 incumbent mayor Buck Kratzer won re-election.

== Education ==
Ekalaka Public Schools educates students from kindergarten through 12th grade. There is the Ekalaka Elementary District and Carter County High School. They are known as the Bulldogs.

== Media ==
The Ekalaka Eagle is the official newspaper of Carter County. It is published weekly both in print and online.

== Infrastructure ==
Ekalaka is the southern start of Montana Highway 7 and the northern end of Montana Secondary Highway 323.

Ekalaka Airport is a public use airport located 2 miles southeast of town.

== Notable person ==
- Bertha Berry, pioneering nurse in Ekalaka
