= Bertha Berry =

American nurse (1876–1954)

Bertha Elizabeth (Wikoff) Berry (1876–1954) was a nurse and the founder of the Berry Hospital in Ekalaka, Montana.

== Early life ==
Bertha Wikoff was born in Adams County, Ohio, to a family of French extraction. Her parents were Hosea and Anne Belle Wikoff. At age 21 Berry moved with her family to Chandler, Oklahoma Territory.

== Marriage ==
In Oklahoma, Bertha met a sawyer from Colorado, Charles Berry. The two married in 1900 and had three daughters. In 1910 the family moved to Ekalaka in search of lumber, there two more daughters were born.

== Education ==
Berry began studying nursing in 1924, taking a correspondence course in the subject from The Chautauqua School of Nursing.

== Berry Hospital ==
Less than two years after beginning her studies, Bertha Berry purchased a large house in Ekalaka and opened the Berry Hospital, which was the first hospital to operate in Ekalaka. The Berry Hospital was primarily a maternity hospital, and was the only formal medical facility in the town until 1942, when the Dahl Memorial Hospital, now the Dahl Memorial Healthcare Association, was opened.

== Death ==
Charles Berry died in 1943, a year after the Berry Hospital closed its doors. Bertha Berry survived another 11 years, dying at age 77 in 1954.
