= Lindey's Landing West Seaplane Base =

- IATA: none; ICAO: none; FAA LID: M35

Summary
- Airport type: Public
- Owner: Lindemer family
- Serves: Seeley Lake, Montana
- Elevation AMSL: 3,993 ft / 1,217 m
- Coordinates: 47°10′28″N 113°28′48″W
- Interactive map of Lindey's Landing West Seaplane Base

Runways
| Direction | Length | | Surface |
| Direction | ft | m | Surface |
|---|---|---|---|
| 12/30 | 14,000 | 4,267 | Water |

Statistics (2005)
- Aircraft operations: 230
- Source: Federal Aviation Administration

Lindey's Landing West Seaplane Base (FAA LID: M35) is a privately owned, public-use seaplane base located one nautical mile (2 km) northwest of the central business district of Seeley Lake, a community in Missoula County, Montana, United States.

== Facilities and aircraft ==
Lindey's Landing West Seaplane Base has one seaplane landing area designated 12/30 which measures 14,000 x 1,000 feet (4,267 x 305 m). For the 12-month period ending August 24, 2005, the airport had 230 aircraft operations: 70% general aviation and 30% military.

== See also ==
- List of airports in Montana
