= Turner, Montana =

Unincorporated community in Montana, United States

- Census-designated place and Unincorporated community
- Location within Montana Location within the United States
- Coordinates: 48°50′49″N 108°24′02″W
- Country: United States
- State: Montana
- County: Blaine

Area
  - Total: 0.44 sq mi (1.15 km^{2})
  - Land: 0.44 sq mi (1.15 km^{2})
  - Water: 0 sq mi (0.00 km^{2})
- Elevation: 3,058 ft (932 m)

Population (2020)
  - Total: 90
  - Density: 202.4/sq mi (78.16/km^{2})
- Time zone: UTC-7 (Mountain (MST))
  - Summer (DST): UTC-6 (MDT)
- ZIP code: 59542
- Area code: 406
- GNIS feature ID: 2583861

Turner is a census-designated place in Blaine County, Montana, United States. The population was 90 at the 2020 census, up from 61 in the 2010 census. The town is 10 mi (16 km) south of the Turner–Climax Border Crossing into Canada. The area is nicknamed the "Big Flat".

Turner has the post office serving ZIP code 59542, as well as other businesses and services. It is located on Montana State Highway 241, 41.5 miles (66.8 km) east-northeast of Chinook.

== History ==
In 1912, Henry Turner built a store and opened a post office. In 1928 the town moved about two miles to the location of the Great Northern Railway's new line between Saco and Hogeland.

The Anna Scherlie Homestead Shack is near town. Scherlie arrived in 1913 and was one of many women homesteaders. The home has been maintained exactly as she left it.

== Climate ==
According to the Köppen Climate Classification system, Turner has a semi-arid climate, abbreviated "BSk" on climate maps.

== Demographics ==
Historical population
Census	Pop.	Note	%±
2020	90		—
U.S. Decennial Census

== Education ==
It is in the Turner Elementary School District and the Turner High School District. Both are components of Turner Public Schools.

The high school had 22 students in the 2024-2025 school year. The team name is Tornadoes.

== Infrastructure ==
Turner Airport is a public use airport located one mile northeast of town. The nearest commercial airport is Havre City–County Airport which offers limited flights.

The nearest medical facility is One Health in Chinook.
