= Fairfield Airport =

- IATA: none; ICAO: none; FAA LID: 5U5

Summary
- Airport type: Public
- Owner: City of Fairfield/Teton County
- Serves: Fairfield, Montana
- Elevation AMSL: 3,989 ft (1,216 m)
- Coordinates: 47°38′04″N 111°58′51″W
- Interactive map of Fairfield Airport

Runways
| Direction | Length | | Surface |
| Direction | ft | m | Surface |
|---|---|---|---|
| 18/36 | 3,800 | 1,158 | Asphalt |
| 7/25 | 1,525 | 465 | Turf |

Statistics (2008)
- Aircraft operations: 3,850
- Source: Federal Aviation Administration

Fairfield Airport (FAA LID: 5U5) is a public airport located one mile (2 km) north of the central business district of Fairfield, in Teton County, Montana, United States. It is owned by the City of Fairfield and Teton County.

== Facilities and aircraft ==
Fairfield Airport covers an area of 173 acres (70 ha) and has two runways: 18/36 with an asphalt surface measuring 3,800 x 40 feet (1,158 x 12 m) and 7/25 with a turf surface measuring 1,525 x 90 ft (465 x 27 m). For the 12-month period ending August 22, 2008, the airport had 3,850 aircraft operations, an average of 10 per day: 97% general aviation and 3% air taxi.

== See also ==
- List of airports in Montana
