= Winifred, Montana =

- Town
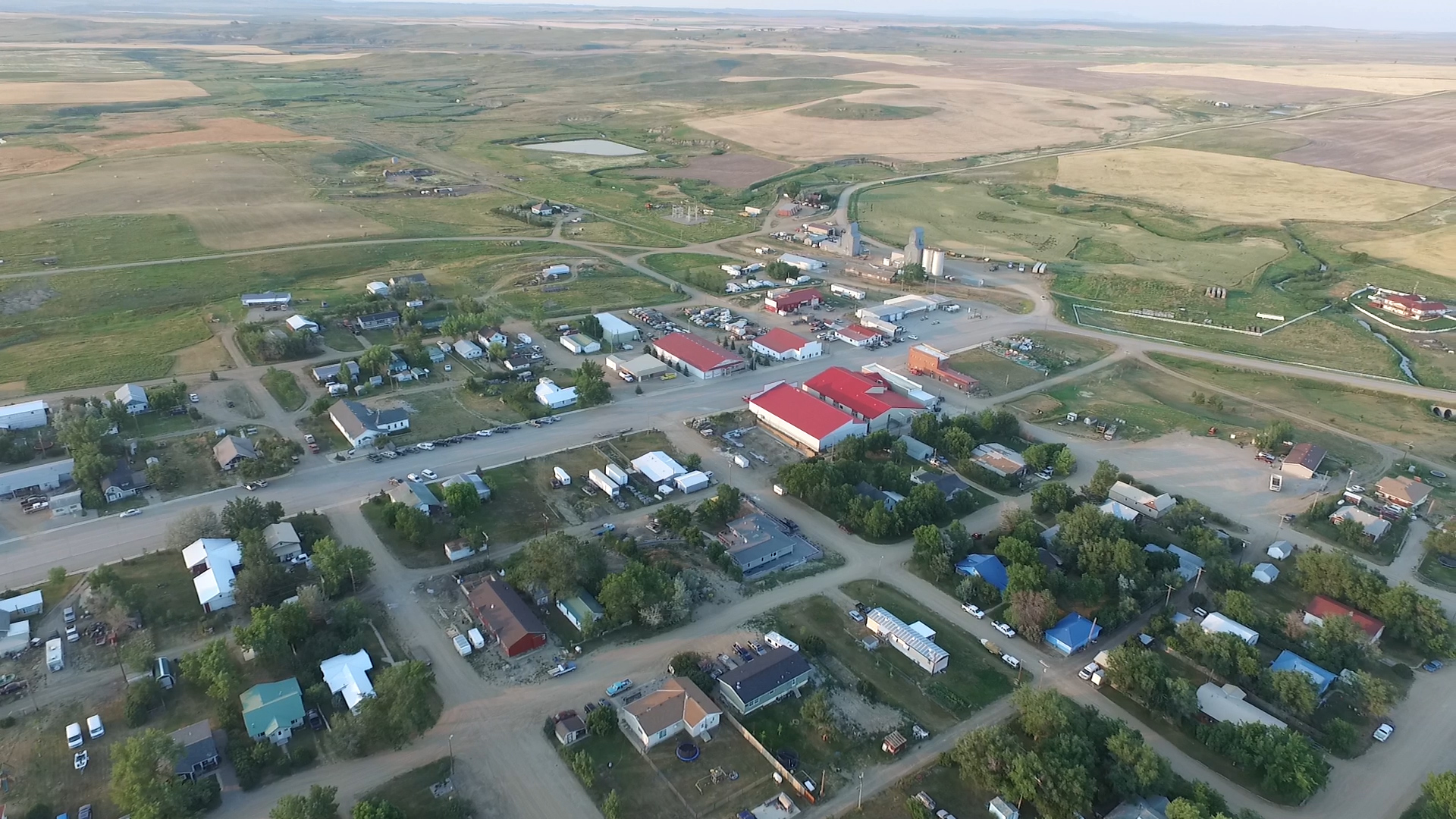
- Downtown and Northeast Winifred (June 2015)

- Seal

- Location of Winifred, Montana

- Location in the United States
- Coordinates: 47°33′43″N 109°22′31″W
- Country: United States
- State: Montana
- County: Fergus

Area
  - Total: 0.53 sq mi (1.36 km^{2})
  - Land: 0.53 sq mi (1.36 km^{2})
  - Water: 0 sq mi (0.00 km^{2})
- Elevation: 3,232 ft (985 m)

Population (2020)
  - Total: 172
  - Density: 328/sq mi (126.8/km^{2})
- Time zone: UTC-7 (Mountain (MST))
  - Summer (DST): UTC-6 (MDT)
- ZIP code: 59489
- Area code: 406
- FIPS code: 30–81025
- GNIS feature ID: 2413498
- Website: www.townofwinifred.com

Winifred is a town in rural north-central Fergus County, Montana, United States. It was founded in 1913 and provides services for its region's populace. The town population was 172 at the 2020 census.

== History ==
Winifred was founded in 1913 as the terminus of a newly built branch line of the Chicago, Milwaukee, St. Paul and Pacific Railroad ("the Milwaukee Road"). It is popularly believed to have been named after one of the railroad owner's two daughters (the other being Christina, another small town about 15 miles away). Built in 1914, Stafford's Grocery is listed on the National Register of Historic Places.

== Geography ==
Winifred is located 39 miles from Lewistown. Stafford Reservoir is nearby.

According to the United States Census Bureau, the town has a total area of 0.50 square miles (1.29 km^{2}), all land.

=== Climate ===
According to the Köppen Climate Classification system, Winifred has a semi-arid climate, abbreviated "BSk" on climate maps.

== Demographics ==
Historical population
Census	Pop.	Note	%±
1920	262		—
1930	251		−4.2%
1940	300		19.5%
1950	217		−27.7%
1960	220		1.4%
1970	190		−13.6%
1980	155		−18.4%
1990	150		−3.2%
2000	156		4.0%
2010	208		33.3%
2020	172		−17.3%
U.S. Decennial Census

=== 2010 census ===
As of the census of 2010, there were 208 people, 92 households, and 65 families living in the town. The population density was 416.0 inhabitants per square mile (160.6/km^{2}). There were 116 housing units at an average density of 232.0 units per square mile (89.6 units/km^{2}). The racial makeup of the town was 94.7% White, 1.0% African American, 3.4% Native American, 0.5% from other races, and 0.5% from two or more races. Hispanic or Latino of any race were 1.0% of the population.

There were 92 households, of which 23.9% had children under the age of 18 living with them, 56.5% were married couples living together, 8.7% had a female householder with no husband present, 5.4% had a male householder with no wife present, and 29.3% were non-families. 26.1% of all households were made up of individuals, and 14.2% had someone living alone who was 65 years of age or older. The average household size was 2.26 and the average family size was 2.72.

The median age in the town was 46.3 years. 20.2% of residents were under the age of 18; 7.1% were between the ages of 18 and 24; 19.7% were from 25 to 44; 33.2% were from 45 to 64; and 19.7% were 65 years of age or older. The gender makeup of the town was 51.4% male and 48.6% female.

=== 2000 census ===
As of the census of 2000, there were 156 people, 69 households, and 38 families living in the town. The population density was 305.0 inhabitants per square mile (117.8/km^{2}). There were 85 housing units at an average density of 166.2 units per square mile (64.2 units/km^{2}). The racial makeup of the town was 96.79% White, 1.28% Native American, 0.64% from other races, and 1.28% from two or more races. Hispanic or Latino of any race were 1.92% of the population.

There were 69 households, out of which 24.6% had children under the age of 18 living with them, 44.9% were married couples living together, 7.2% had a female householder with no husband present, and 43.5% were non-families. 39.1% of all households were made up of individuals, and 13.0% had someone living alone who was 65 years of age or older. The average household size was 2.26 and the average family size was 3.13.

In the town, the population was spread out, with 23.1% under the age of 18, 5.8% from 18 to 24, 27.6% from 25 to 44, 28.2% from 45 to 64, and 15.4% who were 65 years of age or older. The median age was 41 years. For every 100 females there were 116.7 males. For every 100 females age 18 and over, there were 110.5 males.

The median income for a household in the town was $25,000, and the median income for a family was $33,393. Males had a median income of $17,321 versus $18,750 for females. The per capita income for the town was $12,600. About 17.0% of families and 23.9% of the population were below the poverty line, including 42.9% of those under the age of eighteen and 16.0% of those 65 or over.

== Arts and culture ==
The Winifred Museum has a collection of artifacts and exhibits from the town and surrounding region. They claim to have the world's largest Tonka truck collection.

The Dorothy 'Eric' Asbjornson Community Library is the public library serving the community.

== Government ==
Winifred has a mayor and town council. Shirley Dyer ran unopposed for mayor in 2025.

== Education ==
Winifred Public Schools educates students from kindergarten through 12th grade. Winifred High School is a Class C school (less than 108 students) which determines athletic competitions.

== Infrastructure ==
Winifred Airport is a public-use airport located 1 mile south of town.
