= Ruby Valley Field =

- IATA: none; ICAO: none; FAA LID: 7S1

Summary
- Airport type: Public
- Owner: Madison County & Town of Twin Bridges
- Serves: Twin Bridges, Montana
- Elevation AMSL: 4,777 ft (1,456 m)
- Coordinates: 45°32′01″N 112°18′09″W

Map
- Location of airport in Montana

Runways
Direction	Length		Surface
Direction	ft	m	Surface
17/35	4,299	1,310	Asphalt
7/25	3,400	1,036	Turf/gravel

Statistics (2009)
- Aircraft operations: 2,650
- Based aircraft: 10
- Source: Federal Aviation Administration

Ruby Valley Field (FAA LID: 7S1), formerly Twin Bridges Airport is a public use airport located two nautical miles (4 km) southeast of the central business district of Twin Bridges, a town in Madison County, Montana, United States. It is owned by Madison County and the Town of Twin Bridges. This airport is included in the National Plan of Integrated Airport Systems for 2011–2015, which categorized it as a general aviation facility.

== Facilities and aircraft ==
Ruby Valley Field covers an area of 364 acres (147 ha) at an elevation of 4,777 feet (1,456 m) above mean sea level. It has two runways: 17/35 is 4,299 by 60 feet (1,310 x 18 m) with an asphalt surface; 7/25 is 3,400 by 110 feet (1,036 x 34 m) with a turf and gravel surface.

For the 12-month period ending September 16, 2009, the airport had 2,650 aircraft operations, an average of 220 per month: 98% general aviation and 2% air taxi. At that time there were 10 aircraft based at this airport: 80% single-engine, 10% multi-engine, and 10% ultralight.
