= Lavina, Montana =

- Town
- Location of Lavina, Montana
- Coordinates: 46°17′42″N 108°56′20″W
- Country: United States
- State: Montana
- County: Golden Valley

Area
  - Total: 1.01 sq mi (2.62 km^{2})
  - Land: 1.01 sq mi (2.62 km^{2})
  - Water: 0 sq mi (0.00 km^{2})
- Elevation: 3,442 ft (1,049 m)

Population (2020)
  - Total: 136
  - Density: 134.5/sq mi (51.93/km^{2})
- Time zone: UTC-7 (Mountain (MST))
  - Summer (DST): UTC-6 (MDT)
- ZIP code: 59046
- Area code: 406
- FIPS code: 30-42850
- GNIS feature ID: 2412881

Lavina is a town in Golden Valley County, Montana, United States. The population was 136 at the 2020 census. The town is situated on the north bank of the Musselshell River.

The town became a stage stop in 1882. The town incorporated in 1920.

== Geography ==
Montana Highway 3 intersects with U.S. Route 12 at the town.

According to the United States Census Bureau, the town has a total area of 1.00 square mile (2.59 km^{2}), all land.

=== Climate ===
This climatic region is typified by large seasonal temperature differences, with warm to hot (and often humid) summers and cold (sometimes severely cold) winters. According to the Köppen Climate Classification system, Lavina has a humid continental climate, abbreviated "Dfb" on climate maps.

== Demographics ==
Historical population
Census	Pop.	Note	%±
1930	148		—
1940	199		34.5%
1950	195		−2.0%
1960	212		8.7%
1970	169		−20.3%
1980	164		−3.0%
1990	151		−7.9%
2000	209		38.4%
2010	187		−10.5%
2020	136		−27.3%
U.S. Decennial Census

=== 2010 census ===
As of the census of 2010, there were 187 people, 79 households, and 52 families residing in the town. The population density was 187.0 inhabitants per square mile (72.2/km^{2}). There were 91 housing units at an average density of 91.0 per square mile (35.1/km^{2}). The racial makeup of the town was 89.3% White, 0.5% Native American, 1.6% Asian, 3.7% from other races, and 4.8% from two or more races. Hispanic or Latino of any race were 3.7% of the population.

There were 79 households, of which 26.6% had children under the age of 18 living with them, 50.6% were married couples living together, 7.6% had a female householder with no husband present, 7.6% had a male householder with no wife present, and 34.2% were non-families. 32.9% of all households were made up of individuals, and 11.4% had someone living alone who was 65 years of age or older. The average household size was 2.37 and the average family size was 3.00.

The median age in the town was 44.5 years. 25.7% of residents were under the age of 18; 7.5% were between the ages of 18 and 24; 17.6% were from 25 to 44; 33.2% were from 45 to 64; and 16% were 65 years of age or older. The gender makeup of the town was 51.3% male and 48.7% female.

=== 2000 census ===
As of the census of 2000, there were 209 people, 85 households, and 57 families residing in the town. The population density was 206.9 inhabitants per square mile (79.9/km^{2}). There were 98 housing units at an average density of 97.0 per square mile (37.5/km^{2}). The racial makeup of the town was 98.56% White, 0.48% Asian, and 0.96% from two or more races. Hispanic or Latino of any race were 3.35% of the population.

There were 85 households, out of which 29.4% had children under the age of 18 living with them, 57.6% were married couples living together, 5.9% had a female householder with no husband present, and 32.9% were non-families. 28.2% of all households were made up of individuals, and 11.8% had someone living alone who was 65 years of age or older. The average household size was 2.46 and the average family size was 2.96.

In the town, the population was spread out, with 26.8% under the age of 18, 5.3% from 18 to 24, 23.4% from 25 to 44, 33.0% from 45 to 64, and 11.5% who were 65 years of age or older. The median age was 43 years. For every 100 females there were 90.0 males. For every 100 females age 18 and over, there were 96.2 males.

The median income for a household in the town was $24,643, and the median income for a family was $28,750. Males had a median income of $36,250 versus $23,750 for females. The per capita income for the town was $12,475. About 17.6% of families and 20.4% of the population were below the poverty line, including 21.0% of those under the age of eighteen and 20.7% of those 65 or over.

=== Historic sites ===
Lavina contains three sites on the National Register of Historic Places: the Adams Hotel, the Lavina State Bank building, and the Slayton Mercantile Co. building.

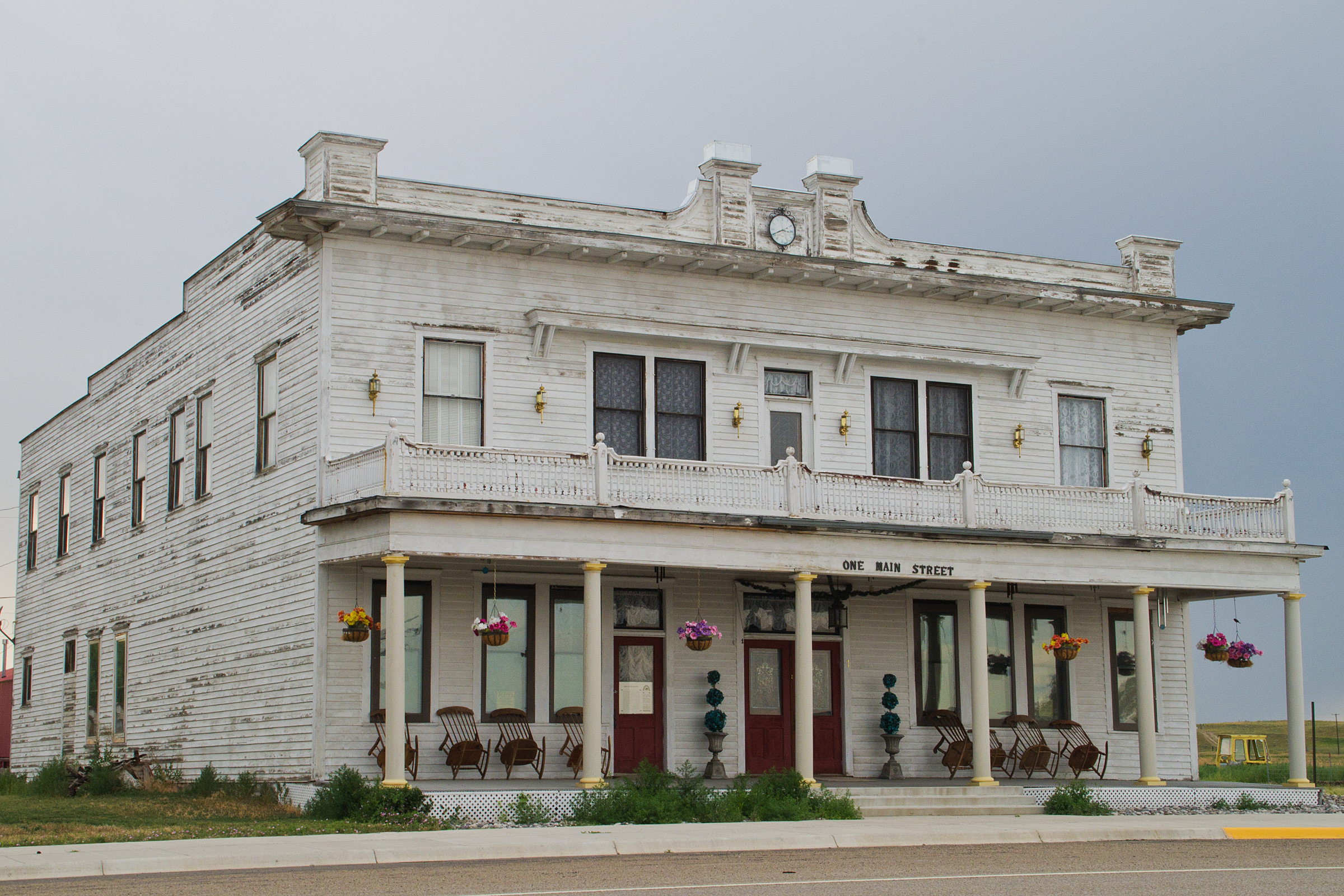
Adams Hotel

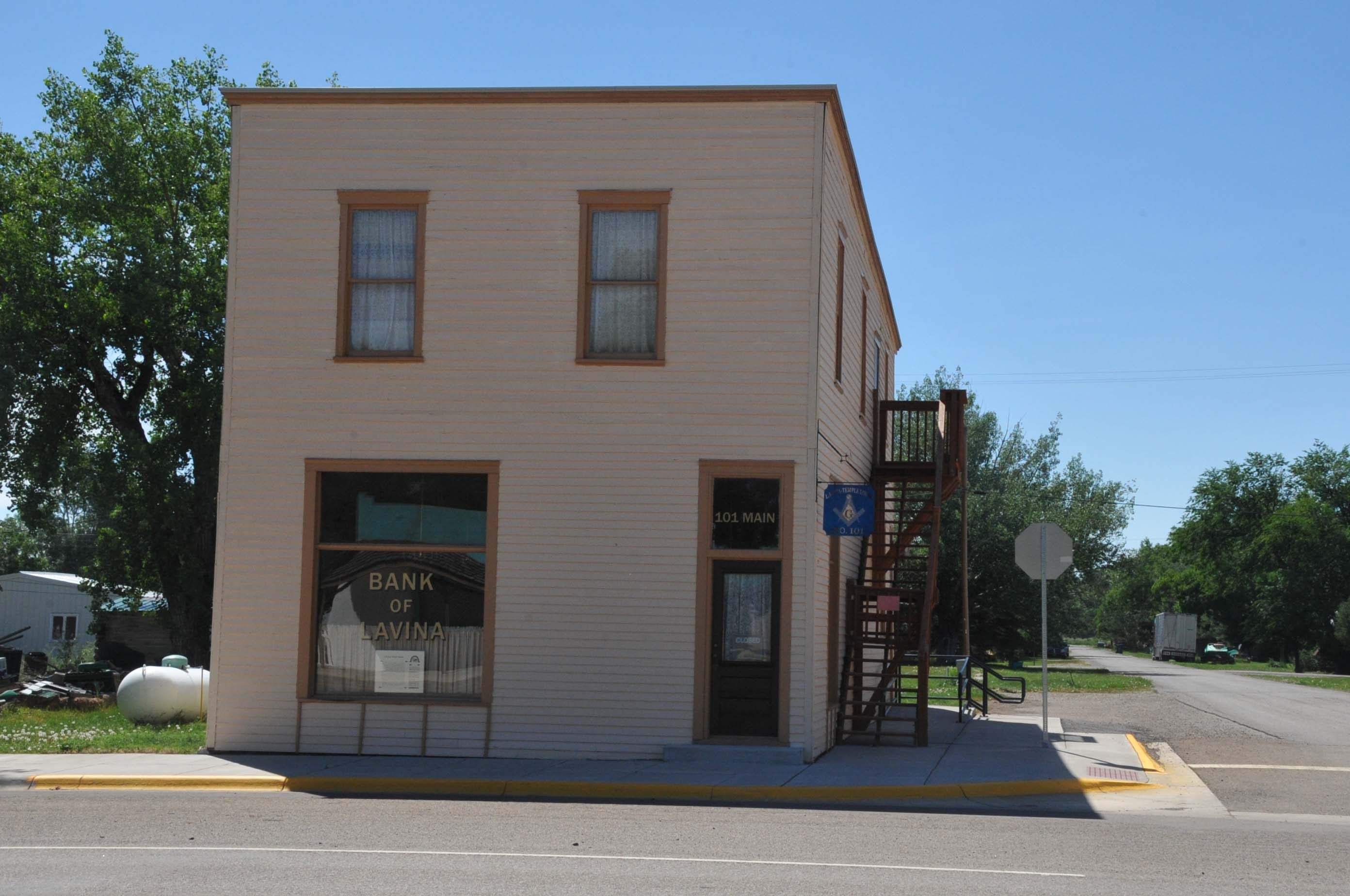
Lavina State Bank

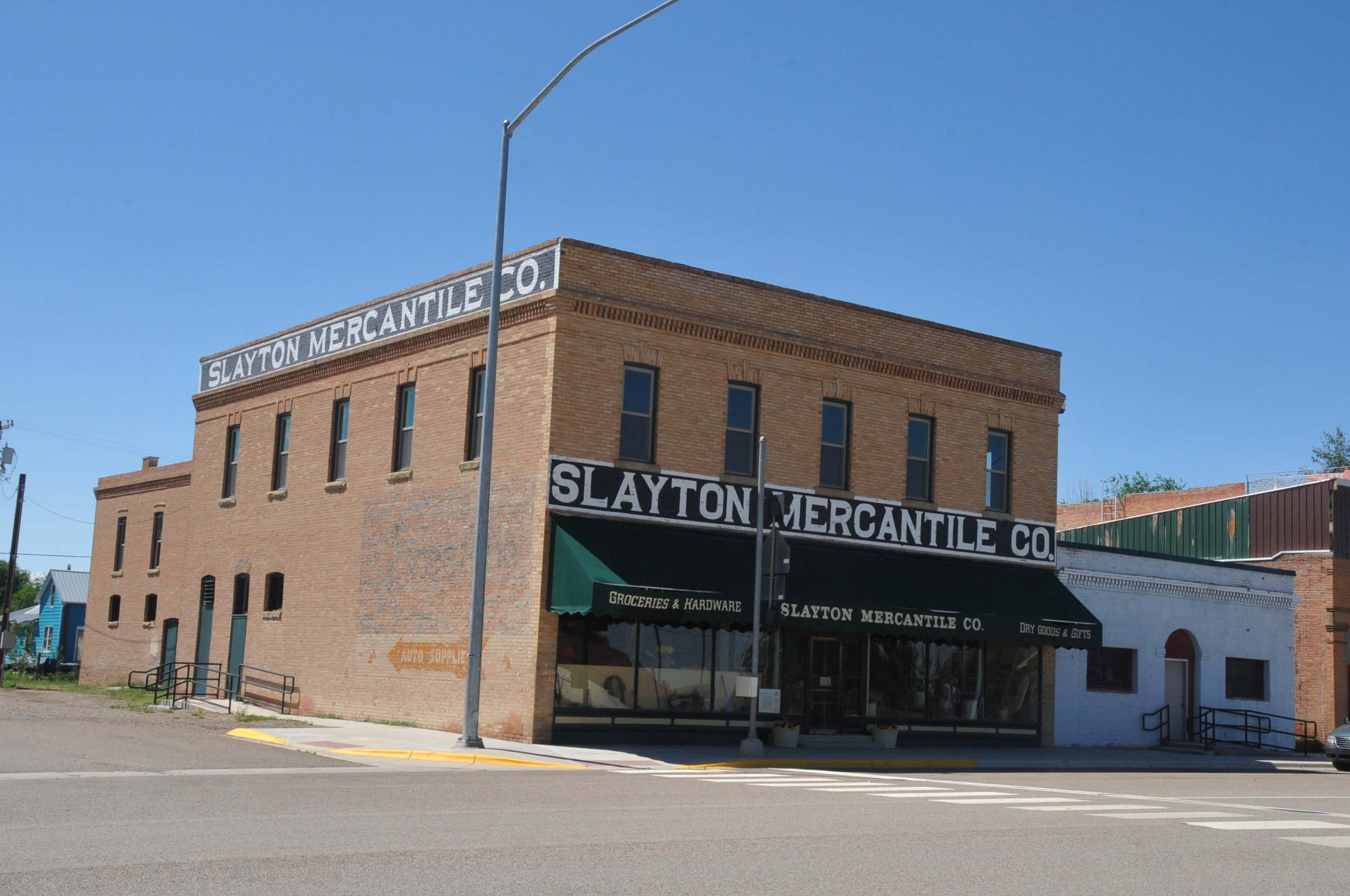
Slayton Mercantile Co.

== Education ==
Lavina Public Schools educates students from kindergarten through 12th grade. Lavina High School is a Class C school (fewer than 108 students) which helps determine athletic competitions. They are known as the Pirates.
