= Fairfield Municipal Airport (Illinois) =

Airport in Illinois, United States of America

- IATA: none; ICAO: KFWC; FAA LID: FWC

Summary
- Airport type: Public
- Owner: City of Fairfield
- Serves: Fairfield, Illinois
- Elevation AMSL: 436 ft (133 m)
- Coordinates: 38°22′43″N 088°24′46″W

Map
- Location of airport in Illinois FWC (the United States)

Runways
Direction	Length		Surface
Direction	ft	m	Surface
9/27	4,000	1,219	Asphalt
18/36	1,999	609	Asphalt

Statistics (2019)
- Aircraft operations: 8,000
- Source: Federal Aviation Administration

Fairfield Municipal Airport (ICAO: KFWC, FAA LID: FWC) is a city-owned, public-use airport located two nautical miles (3.7 km) west of the central business district of Fairfield, in Wayne County, Illinois. According to the FAA's National Plan of Integrated Airport Systems for 2009 to 2013, it was classified as a general aviation airport.

Although most U.S. airports use the same three-letter location identifier for the FAA and IATA, this airport is assigned FWC by the FAA but has no designation from the IATA.

== Facilities and aircraft ==
Fairfield Municipal Airport covers an area of 173 acres (70 ha) at an elevation of 436 feet (133 m) above mean sea level. It has two asphalt paved runways: 9/27 is 4,000 by 75 feet (1,219 x 23 m) and 18/36 is 1,999 by 60 feet (609 x 18 m).

The airport has a fixed base operator. Fuel is available, as are a lounge, restrooms, weather planning stations, and a courtesy car.

For the 12-month period ending June 30, 2019, the airport had 8,000 aircraft operations, an average of 22 per day: 94% general aviation and 6% air taxi. For the same time period, there were 14 airplanes based on the field: 13 single-engine and 1 multi-engine airplanes.

== See also ==
- List of airports in Illinois
