= Belle Creek, Montana =

Unincorporated community in Montana, United States

Belle Creek
- Unincorporated community
- Location within the state of Montana
- Coordinates: 45°7′33″N 105°6′18″W
- Country: United States
- State: Montana
- County: Powder River
- Elevation: 3,570 ft (1,090 m)
- Time zone: UTC-7 (Mountain (MST))
  - Summer (DST): UTC-6 (MDT)
- GNIS feature ID: 802022

Belle Creek (also Bell Creek) is an unincorporated community in southeastern Powder River County, Montana, United States. It lies along local roads southeast of the town of Broadus, the county seat of Powder River County.

The town was founded in 1968 by oil and gas developer Sam Gary in response to the growth of the Bell Creek oil field.

== Climate ==
According to the Köppen Climate Classification system, Belle Creek has a semi-arid climate, abbreviated "BSk" on climate maps.
