= Morgan, Montana =

Unincorporated community in Montana, United States

- Unincorporated community
- Location within Montana Location within the United States
- Coordinates: 48°59′36″N 107°49′56″W
- Country: United States
- State: Montana
- County: Phillips
- Elevation: 2,854 ft (870 m)
- Time zone: UTC-7 (Mountain (MST))
  - Summer (DST): UTC-6 (MDT)
- Area code: 406
- GNIS feature ID: 767925

Morgan is an unincorporated community in Phillips County, Montana, United States.

== Description ==
Morgan is located at the Canada–United States border on U.S. Route 191, 44 miles (71 km) north of Malta.

In the footnotes of The Big Roads (2011) by Earl Swift, the author says that Morgan is the U.S. settlement farthest away (191.4 miles) from an Interstate highway.

== Climate ==
According to the Köppen Climate Classification system, Morgan has a cold semi-arid climate, abbreviated "BSk" on climate maps. The hottest temperature recorded in Morgan was 103 °F (39.4 °C) on August 6, 1983, while the coldest temperature recorded was −42 °F (−41.1 °C) on December 24, 1983.

Climate data for Morgan, Montana, 1991–2020 normals, extremes 1976–present
Month	Jan	Feb	Mar	Apr	May	Jun	Jul	Aug	Sep	Oct	Nov	Dec	Year
Record high °F (°C)	60 (16)	67 (19)	73 (23)	89 (32)	97 (36)	101 (38)	102 (39)	103 (39)	100 (38)	88 (31)	76 (24)	61 (16)	103 (39)
Mean maximum °F (°C)	45.6 (7.6)	47.5 (8.6)	60.6 (15.9)	75.1 (23.9)	83.7 (28.7)	88.8 (31.6)	93.7 (34.3)	96.3 (35.7)	88.7 (31.5)	75.2 (24.0)	59.2 (15.1)	46.8 (8.2)	97.4 (36.3)
Mean daily maximum °F (°C)	22.7 (−5.2)	27.6 (−2.4)	40.3 (4.6)	55.9 (13.3)	66.8 (19.3)	74.0 (23.3)	83.0 (28.3)	82.7 (28.2)	71.5 (21.9)	55.8 (13.2)	38.4 (3.6)	25.9 (−3.4)	53.7 (12.1)
Daily mean °F (°C)	13.5 (−10.3)	17.7 (−7.9)	29.3 (−1.5)	42.9 (6.1)	53.1 (11.7)	61.2 (16.2)	68.4 (20.2)	67.5 (19.7)	57.0 (13.9)	43.2 (6.2)	28.4 (−2.0)	16.7 (−8.5)	41.6 (5.3)
Mean daily minimum °F (°C)	4.4 (−15.3)	7.8 (−13.4)	18.2 (−7.7)	29.9 (−1.2)	39.4 (4.1)	48.3 (9.1)	53.8 (12.1)	52.2 (11.2)	42.6 (5.9)	30.7 (−0.7)	18.5 (−7.5)	7.6 (−13.6)	29.5 (−1.4)
Mean minimum °F (°C)	−24.0 (−31.1)	−15.2 (−26.2)	−7.2 (−21.8)	13.6 (−10.2)	24.5 (−4.2)	37.1 (2.8)	43.9 (6.6)	39.4 (4.1)	27.9 (−2.3)	10.2 (−12.1)	−3.4 (−19.7)	−16.0 (−26.7)	−28.7 (−33.7)
Record low °F (°C)	−40 (−40)	−39 (−39)	−29 (−34)	−4 (−20)	14 (−10)	29 (−2)	36 (2)	31 (−1)	18 (−8)	−14 (−26)	−32 (−36)	−42 (−41)	−42 (−41)
Average precipitation inches (mm)	0.46 (12)	0.19 (4.8)	0.25 (6.4)	0.90 (23)	1.83 (46)	3.01 (76)	1.82 (46)	1.29 (33)	1.28 (33)	0.77 (20)	0.44 (11)	0.37 (9.4)	12.61 (320.6)
Average snowfall inches (cm)	3.5 (8.9)	3.0 (7.6)	4.6 (12)	1.4 (3.6)	0.6 (1.5)	0.0 (0.0)	0.0 (0.0)	0.0 (0.0)	0.3 (0.76)	1.8 (4.6)	3.6 (9.1)	4.1 (10)	22.9 (58.06)
Average precipitation days (≥ 0.01 in)	3.7	3.5	3.3	5.3	8.5	11.5	7.4	6.3	5.8	4.6	3.8	3.7	67.4
Average snowy days (≥ 0.1 in)	3.7	3.1	2.5	1.0	0.2	0.0	0.0	0.0	0.1	0.9	2.0	2.9	16.4
Source 1: NOAA
Source 2: National Weather Service
