= Condon, Montana =

Census-designated place & unincorporated community in Montana, United States

- Census-designated place
- Location within Montana Location within the United States
- Coordinates: 47°31′40″N 113°42′38″W
- Country: United States
- State: Montana
- County: Missoula

Area
  - Total: 21.58 sq mi (55.90 km^{2})
  - Land: 21.40 sq mi (55.42 km^{2})
  - Water: 0.19 sq mi (0.48 km^{2})
- Elevation: 3,783 ft (1,153 m)

Population (2020)
  - Total: 285
  - Density: 13.3/sq mi (5.14/km^{2})
- Time zone: UTC-7 (Mountain (MST))
  - Summer (DST): UTC-6 (MDT)
- ZIP code: 59826
- Area code: 406
- GNIS feature ID: 2583798
- FIPS code: 30-17050

Condon is an unincorporated community and census-designated place in Missoula County, Montana, United States. Located along the Swan River and Montana Highway 83, Condon is situated between the Swan Range to the east and the Mission Mountains to the west, providing ready access to the Bob Marshall Wilderness and Mission Mountains Wilderness, respectively. Its population was 285 as of the 2020 United States census, down from 343 in 2010.

Condon is the site of a U.S. post office, using ZIP Code 59826, which opened on July 1, 1952. It is named for James L. Condon, a Corvallis-area logger and farmer. Mission Mountain School was located in the community and the U.S. Forest Service operates an airport in Condon.

== Geography ==
Condon is in northern Missoula County, 80 miles (130 km) by highway north of Missoula, the county seat, and 64 miles (103 km) south of Kalispell. Elevations in the community along the Swan River range from 3,540 feet (1,080 m) in the north to 3,800 feet (1,200 m) in the south, and to the east the elevation rises to 5,200 feet (1,600 m) at the base of the Swan Range. Via the Swan River, Condon is within the watershed of the Flathead River.

According to the U.S. Census Bureau, the Condon CDP has a total area of 21.6 square miles (56 km^{2}), of which 0.2 square miles (0.5 km^{2}), or 0.86%, are water.

== Climate ==
This climatic region is typified by large seasonal temperature differences, with warm to hot (and often humid) summers and cold (sometimes severely cold) winters. According to the Köppen Climate Classification system, Condon has a humid continental climate, abbreviated "Dfb" on climate maps.

The local weather station is located at the USFS Condon Work Center. The area has a humid continental climate (Köppen Dfb), with warm summers and cold, snowy winters.

Climate data for Condon, Montana, 1991–2020 normals, extremes 1959–present
Month	Jan	Feb	Mar	Apr	May	Jun	Jul	Aug	Sep	Oct	Nov	Dec	Year
Record high °F (°C)	56 (13)	61 (16)	71 (22)	81 (27)	87 (31)	97 (36)	101 (38)	102 (39)	96 (36)	83 (28)	66 (19)	58 (14)	102 (39)
Mean maximum °F (°C)	46.3 (7.9)	48.9 (9.4)	58.3 (14.6)	67.7 (19.8)	77.6 (25.3)	83.4 (28.6)	89.6 (32.0)	89.6 (32.0)	84.2 (29.0)	71.8 (22.1)	55.1 (12.8)	45.1 (7.3)	91.2 (32.9)
Mean daily maximum °F (°C)	30.6 (−0.8)	34.0 (1.1)	42.2 (5.7)	49.9 (9.9)	60.4 (15.8)	67.6 (19.8)	78.2 (25.7)	77.9 (25.5)	67.3 (19.6)	51.5 (10.8)	37.5 (3.1)	29.0 (−1.7)	52.2 (11.2)
Daily mean °F (°C)	23.5 (−4.7)	25.3 (−3.7)	32.8 (0.4)	39.7 (4.3)	49.2 (9.6)	56.1 (13.4)	64.3 (17.9)	63.3 (17.4)	54.3 (12.4)	41.9 (5.5)	30.6 (−0.8)	22.7 (−5.2)	42.0 (5.5)
Mean daily minimum °F (°C)	16.3 (−8.7)	16.6 (−8.6)	23.3 (−4.8)	29.6 (−1.3)	37.9 (3.3)	44.5 (6.9)	50.3 (10.2)	48.8 (9.3)	41.4 (5.2)	32.4 (0.2)	23.8 (−4.6)	16.5 (−8.6)	31.8 (−0.1)
Mean minimum °F (°C)	−10.5 (−23.6)	−7.6 (−22.0)	3.7 (−15.7)	17.8 (−7.9)	26.7 (−2.9)	34.0 (1.1)	40.7 (4.8)	38.2 (3.4)	28.8 (−1.8)	15.2 (−9.3)	4.9 (−15.1)	−6.6 (−21.4)	−19.6 (−28.7)
Record low °F (°C)	−38 (−39)	−40 (−40)	−29 (−34)	−1 (−18)	21 (−6)	26 (−3)	28 (−2)	28 (−2)	17 (−8)	−7 (−22)	−16 (−27)	−39 (−39)	−40 (−40)
Average precipitation inches (mm)	2.92 (74)	2.39 (61)	2.21 (56)	2.09 (53)	2.12 (54)	2.49 (63)	0.89 (23)	1.04 (26)	1.38 (35)	2.43 (62)	2.80 (71)	2.60 (66)	25.36 (644)
Average snowfall inches (cm)	30.7 (78)	23.6 (60)	18.4 (47)	9.0 (23)	1.7 (4.3)	0.4 (1.0)	0.0 (0.0)	0.0 (0.0)	0.0 (0.0)	4.9 (12)	19.3 (49)	28.5 (72)	136.5 (346.3)
Average extreme snow depth inches (cm)	26.2 (67)	29.6 (75)	28.9 (73)	16.9 (43)	1.6 (4.1)	0.1 (0.25)	0.0 (0.0)	0.0 (0.0)	0.0 (0.0)	1.8 (4.6)	8.4 (21)	17.7 (45)	32.6 (83)
Average precipitation days (≥ 0.01 in)	19.0	15.7	16.4	14.5	13.4	13.4	6.1	6.5	8.5	12.6	16.4	19.1	161.6
Average snowy days (≥ 0.1 in)	16.8	13.9	11.1	5.6	0.9	0.1	0.0	0.0	0.1	2.7	10.8	16.9	78.9
Source 1: NOAA
Source 2: National Weather Service

== Education ==
It is in the Swan Valley Elementary School District and the Missoula High School District.

The Missoula Public Library has a branch location in Condon.

== Media ==
The Seeley-Swan Pathfinder is the newspaper for Condon, Seeley Lake, Ovando, and other towns in the area. It is published weekly.

== Demographics ==
Historical population
Census	Pop.	Note	%±
2010	343		—
2020	285		−16.9%
U.S. Decennial Census
