= Plains, Montana =

- Town
- Location of Plains, Montana
- Coordinates: 47°27′31″N 114°53′6″W
- Country: United States
- State: Montana
- County: Sanders
- Founded: 1883

Area
  - Total: 0.61 sq mi (1.59 km^{2})
  - Land: 0.61 sq mi (1.59 km^{2})
  - Water: 0 sq mi (0.00 km^{2})
- Elevation: 2,471 ft (753 m)

Population (2020)
  - Total: 1,106
  - Density: 1,799.6/sq mi (694.82/km^{2})
- Time zone: UTC−7 (Mountain (MST))
  - Summer (DST): UTC−6 (MDT)
- ZIP Code: 59859
- Area code: 406
- FIPS code: 30-58150
- GNIS feature ID: 0788983
- Website: www.plainsmt.gov

Plains (Salish: ncc̓kʷi) is a town in Sanders County, Montana, United States. The population was 1,106 at the 2020 census. It was founded as Horse Plains and sometimes called Wild Horse Plains, as the local Native Americans would winter their horses here to feed on the grasses in the valley. The name was later shortened to Plains when the US Postal Service established a presence in 1905.

The town was established in 1883 as a Northern Pacific Railroad station.

Plains was part of Missoula County until 1906, when Sanders County was created.

== Geography ==
Plains is located at 47°27′31″N 114°53′6″W (47.458504, −114.885024). The town straddles the Clark Fork River with the fairgrounds on one shore and the town proper on the other.

According to the United States Census Bureau, the town has a total area of 0.60 square miles (1.55 km^{2}), all land.

=== Climate ===
This climatic region is typified by large seasonal temperature differences, with warm to hot (and often humid) summers and cold (sometimes severely cold) winters. According to the Köppen Climate Classification system, Plains has a humid continental climate, abbreviated "Dfb" on climate maps.

Climate data for Plains, Montana
| Month | Jan | Feb | Mar | Apr | May | Jun | Jul | Aug | Sep | Oct | Nov | Dec | Year |
|---|---|---|---|---|---|---|---|---|---|---|---|---|---|
| Record high °F (°C) | 61 (16) | 67 (19) | 77 (25) | 90 (32) | 96 (36) | 99 (37) | 103 (39) | 108 (42) | 100 (38) | 89 (32) | 72 (22) | 53 (12) | 108 (42) |
| Mean daily maximum °F (°C) | 35 (2) | 41 (5) | 51 (11) | 60 (16) | 69 (21) | 77 (25) | 86 (30) | 86 (30) | 74 (23) | 59 (15) | 42 (6) | 33 (1) | 59 (15) |
| Mean daily minimum °F (°C) | 21 (−6) | 22 (−6) | 27 (−3) | 32 (0) | 37 (3) | 44 (7) | 47 (8) | 45 (7) | 38 (3) | 31 (−1) | 27 (−3) | 19 (−7) | 33 (0) |
| Record low °F (°C) | −32 (−36) | −26 (−32) | −11 (−24) | 10 (−12) | 20 (−7) | 24 (−4) | 27 (−3) | 16 (−9) | 17 (−8) | −6 (−21) | −12 (−24) | −34 (−37) | −34 (−37) |
| Average precipitation inches (mm) | 1.6 (41) | 1.6 (41) | 1.0 (25) | 1.4 (36) | 2.0 (51) | 1.7 (43) | 1.0 (25) | 1.1 (28) | 1.3 (33) | 1.7 (43) | 2.2 (56) | 2.1 (53) | 18.7 (475) |
Source: The Weather Channel

== Demographics ==
Historical population
| Census | Pop. | Note | %± |
|---|---|---|---|
| 1910 | 481 | | — |
| 1920 | 452 | | −6.0% |
| 1930 | 522 | | 15.5% |
| 1940 | 624 | | 19.5% |
| 1950 | 714 | | 14.4% |
| 1960 | 769 | | 7.7% |
| 1970 | 1,046 | | 36.0% |
| 1980 | 1,116 | | 6.7% |
| 1990 | 992 | | −11.1% |
| 2000 | 1,126 | | 13.5% |
| 2010 | 1,048 | | −6.9% |
| 2020 | 1,106 | | 5.5% |
U.S. Decennial Census

=== 2010 census ===
As of the census of 2010, there were 1,048 people, 502 households, and 256 families residing in the town. The population density was 1,746.7 inhabitants per square mile (674.4/km^{2}). There were 593 housing units at an average density of 988.3 units per square mile (381.6 units/km^{2}). The racial makeup of the town was 94.7% White, 0.2% African American, 2.0% Native American, 0.5% Asian, 0.2% from other races, and 2.5% from two or more races. Hispanic or Latino of any race were 2.4% of the population.

There were 502 households, of which 23.3% had children under the age of 18 living with them, 37.1% were married couples living together, 9.8% had a female householder with no husband present, 4.2% had a male householder with no wife present, and 49.0% were non-families. Of all households 43.8% were made up of individuals, and 16.8% had someone living alone who was 65 years of age or older. The average household size was 1.99 and the average family size was 2.78.

The median age in the town was 47.2 years. Of residents 21.1% were under the age of 18; 6% were between the ages of 18 and 24; 20.8% were from 25 to 44; 28.2% were from 45 to 64; and 24% were 65 years of age or older. The gender makeup of the town was 47.6% male and 52.4% female.

=== 2000 census ===
As of the census of 2000, there were 1,126 people, 472 households, and 297 families residing in the town. The population density was 2,005.3 inhabitants per square mile (774.3/km^{2}). There were 532 housing units at an average density of 947.4 units per square mile (365.8 units/km^{2}). The racial makeup of the town was 95.91% White, 0.09% African American, 1.24% Native American, 0.36% Asian, 0.36% from other races, and 2.04% from two or more races. Hispanic or Latino of any race were 2.93% of the population.

There were 472 households, out of which 27.8% had children under the age of 18 living with them, 48.1% were married couples living together, 11.4% had a female householder with no husband present, and 36.9% were non-families. Of all households 32.4% were made up of individuals, and 16.7% had someone living alone who was 65 years of age or older. The average household size was 2.31 and the average family size was 2.88.

In the town, the population was spread out, with 25.4% under the age of 18, 5.9% from 18 to 24, 22.1% from 25 to 44, 24.2% from 45 to 64, and 22.5% who were 65 years of age or older. The median age was 42 years. For every 100 females there were 92.8 males. For every 100 females age 18 and over, there were 90.9 males.

The median income for a household in the town was $26,331, and the median income for a family was $30,893. Males had a median income of $26,875 versus $16,058 for females. The per capita income for the town was $13,010. About 16.7% of families and 20.3% of the population were below the poverty line, including 28.4% of those under age 18 and 10.3% of those age 65 or over.

== Government ==
The town has a mayor and city council, both with four year terms. There are three wards, each with two council members. Chris Allen, a former mayor, became mayor again in the 2025 elections. He replaced Joel Banham who was sworn in as mayor in 2024.

== Education ==
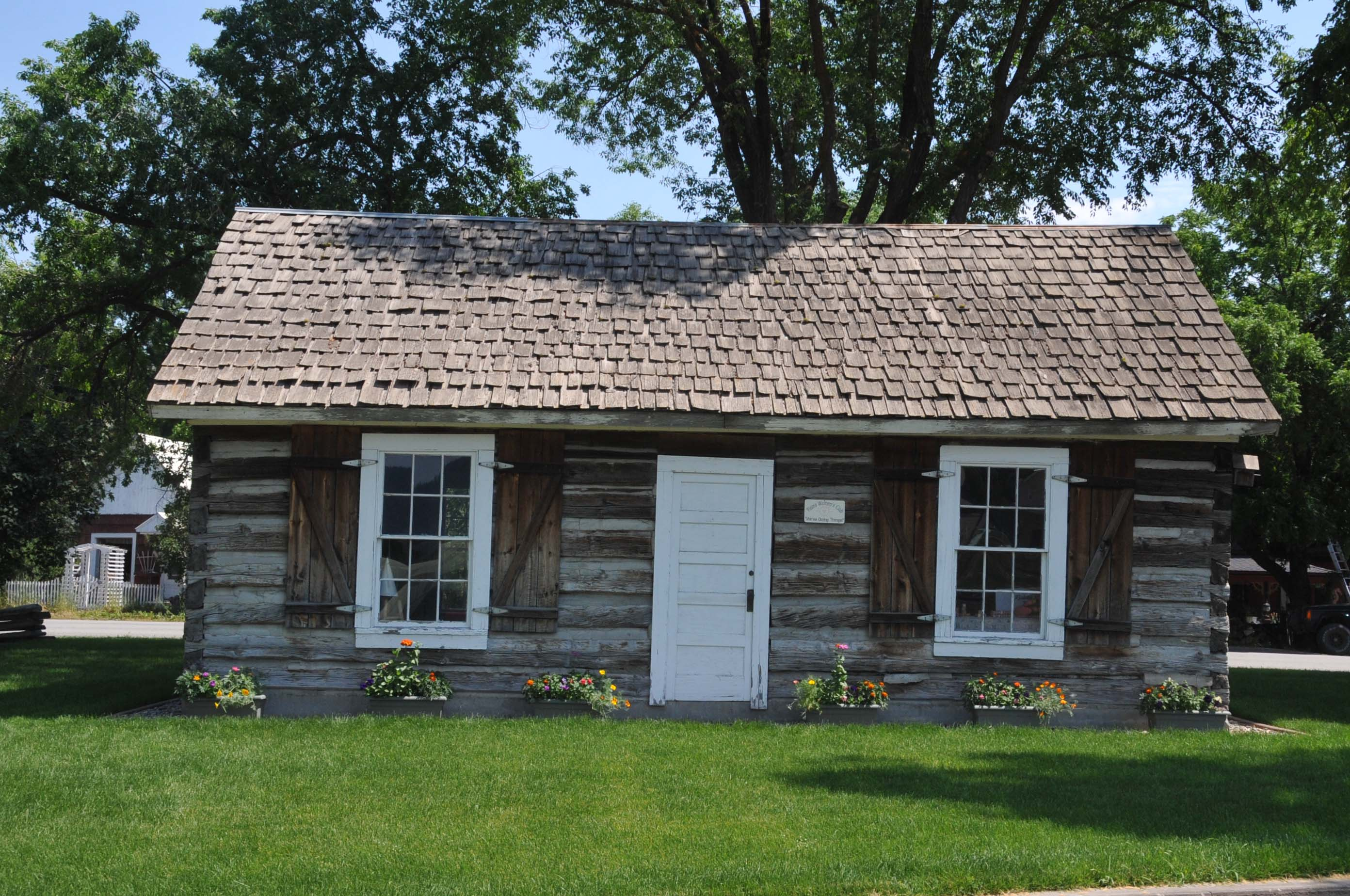
The old Wild Horse Plains Schoolhouse

Plains Public Schools educates students from kindergarten through 12th grade. Plains High School, a Class C school, serves local teenagers. They are known as the Horsemen/Trotters. Its students can participate in sports and extracurricular activities. There are also numerous community youth organizations and clubs including soccer, baseball, softball, drama, and art.

Plains Public Library serves the area.

== Churches ==
- Assembly of God
- Church of Jesus Christ of Latter-Day Saints
- Clarkfork Baptist Church is an Independent Baptist Church. Established in 1993.
- First Lutheran Church (ELCA) is located within the town limits.
- Harvest Community Church.
- Plains Alliance Church
- Plains Bible Chapel
- Plains United Methodist Church
- St. James Catholic Church

== Media ==
The Sanders County Ledger is a local newspaper along with the Clark Fork Valley Press. Both are printed weekly and also available online.

The radio station KPLG is licensed in Plains.

== Infrastructure ==
Plains Airport is a county-owned public-use airport located one mile (1.6 km) northwest of town.
