= Fairfield Municipal Airport (Iowa) =

Coordinates: 41°03′21″N 091°58′51″W

- IATA: FFL; ICAO: KFFL; FAA LID: FFL

Summary
- Airport type: Public
- Owner: City of Fairfield
- Serves: Fairfield, Iowa
- Elevation AMSL: 799 ft (244 m)

Map

Runways
Direction	Length		Surface
Direction	ft	m	Surface
18/36	5,500	1,676	Concrete
8/26	2,450	747	Turf

Statistics (2005)
- Aircraft operations: 9,380
- Based aircraft: 36
- Source: Federal Aviation Administration

Fairfield Municipal Airport (IATA: FFL, ICAO: KFFL, FAA LID: FFL) is a public airport located three miles (5 km) northwest of the central business district of Fairfield, a city in Jefferson County, Iowa, United States. It is owned by the City of Fairfield.

== Facilities and aircraft ==
Fairfield Municipal Airport covers an area of 118 acres (48 ha) which contains two runways: 18/36 with a concrete pavement measuring 5,500 x 100 ft (1,676 x 30 m) and 8/26 with a turf surface 2,450 x 165 ft (747 x 50 m).

For the 12-month period ending November 15, 2005, the airport had 9,380 aircraft operations, an average of 25 per day: 89% general aviation, 9% military and 2% air taxi. There are 36 aircraft based at this airport: 81% single engine, 8% multi-engine, 3% jet and 8% ultralight.

== Historical aircraft ==
A former USAF F-84F Thunderstreak is on static display near the airport terminal.

== See also ==
- List of airports in Iowa
