= List of municipalities in Montana =

Map of the United States with Montana highlighted

Montana is a state located in the Western United States. According to the 2020 United States Census, Montana is the 8th least populous state with 1,084,225 inhabitants but the 4th largest by land area spanning 145,545.80 square miles (376,961.9 km^{2}) of land. Montana is divided into 56 counties and contains 129 municipalities comprising cities and towns. Montana's municipalities cover only 1.2% of the state's land mass but are home to 53.8% of its population. The Montana Code 7-1-4124 gives municipal governments in Montana powers to enact ordinances, borrow money, and enact eminent domain among other legal powers.

In Montana, municipalities are divided into four classes by state statute based on their population. Members of the three largest classes are deemed cities, while the members of the fourth class are called towns. Cities and towns are classified at the time of their organization, and are reorganized when they change classification due to an increase or decrease in population. A place may incorporate as a town with the support of 300 electors or two-thirds of the registered electors. A municipality with a population between 1,000 and 5,000 people is a Third Class city, a municipality with a population between 5,000 and 10,000 people is a Second Class city, and a municipality with a population over 10,000 people is a First Class city. Under certain exceptions, municipalities with a population of between 9,000 and 10,000 may elect by resolution to be either a First or Second Class city. Under similar exceptions, municipalities with a population of between 5,000 and 7,500 may elect by resolution to be either a Second or Third Class city. Municipalities with a population of between 1,000 and 2,500 may by resolution be classified as either a town or Third Class city. Unincorporated places such as census-designated places fall outside this scheme, and are subject to county governance, and thus are neither cities nor towns.

The largest municipality by population in Montana is Billings with 117,116 residents, and the smallest municipality by population is Ismay with 17 residents. The largest municipality by land area is Anaconda, a consolidated city-county, which spans 736.53 mi^{2} (1,907.6 km^{2}), while Rexford and Flaxville are the smallest at 0.10 mi^{2} (0.26 km^{2}).

== List of cities and towns ==
Largest cities and towns in Montana by population

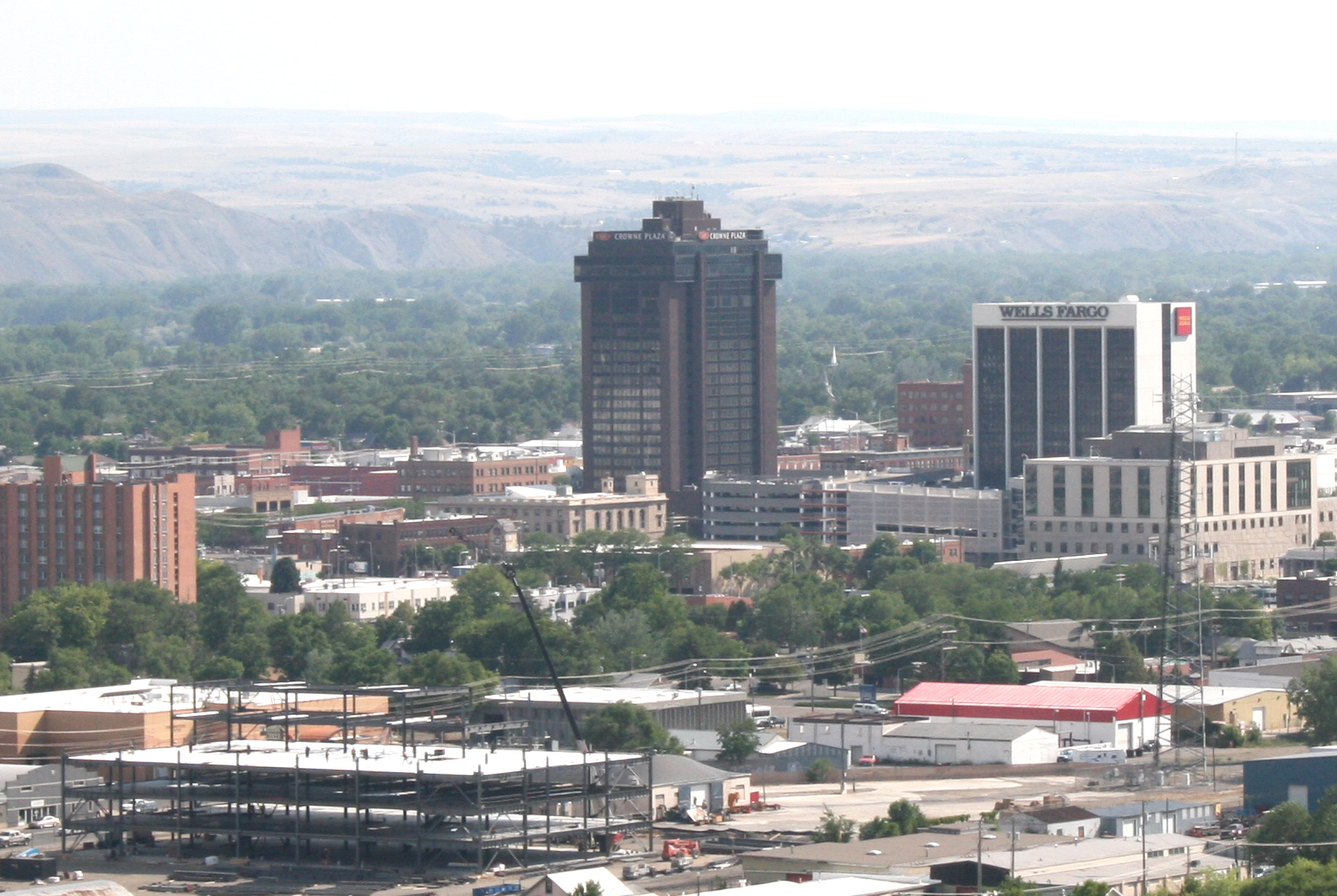
Downtown Billings, Montana's largest municipality by population

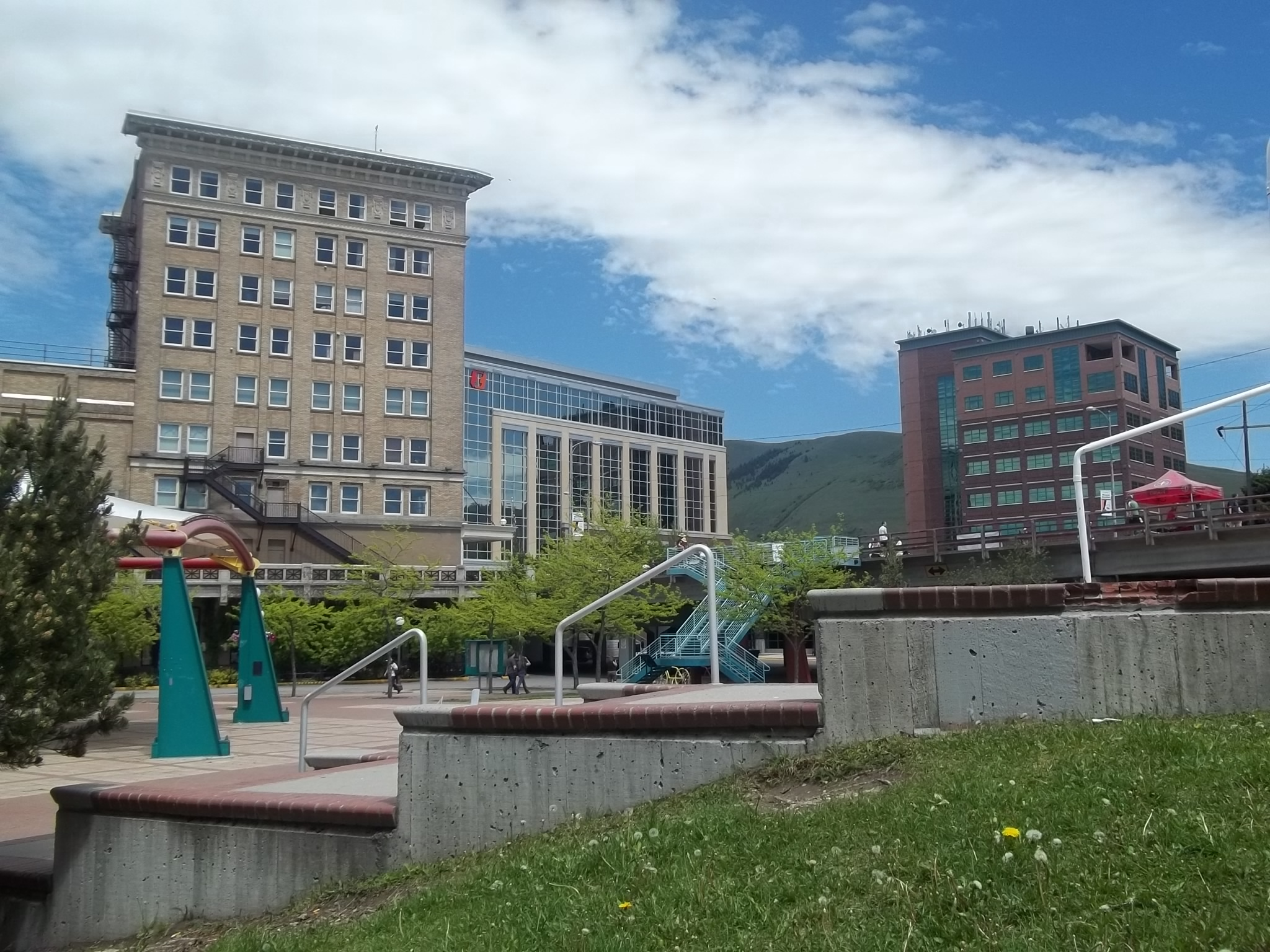
Missoula, Montana's second largest municipality by population

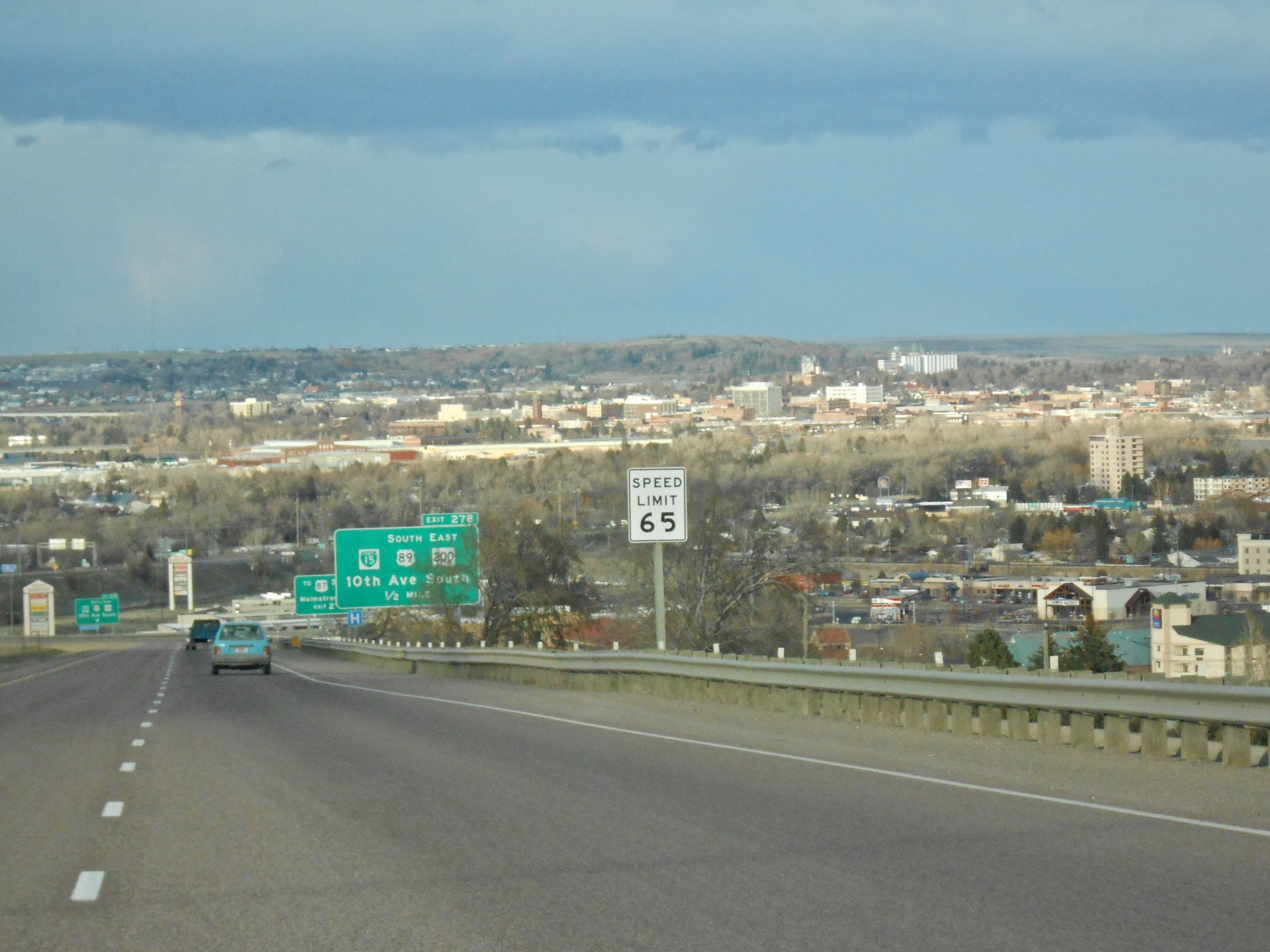
Great Falls, third largest municipality by population in Montana

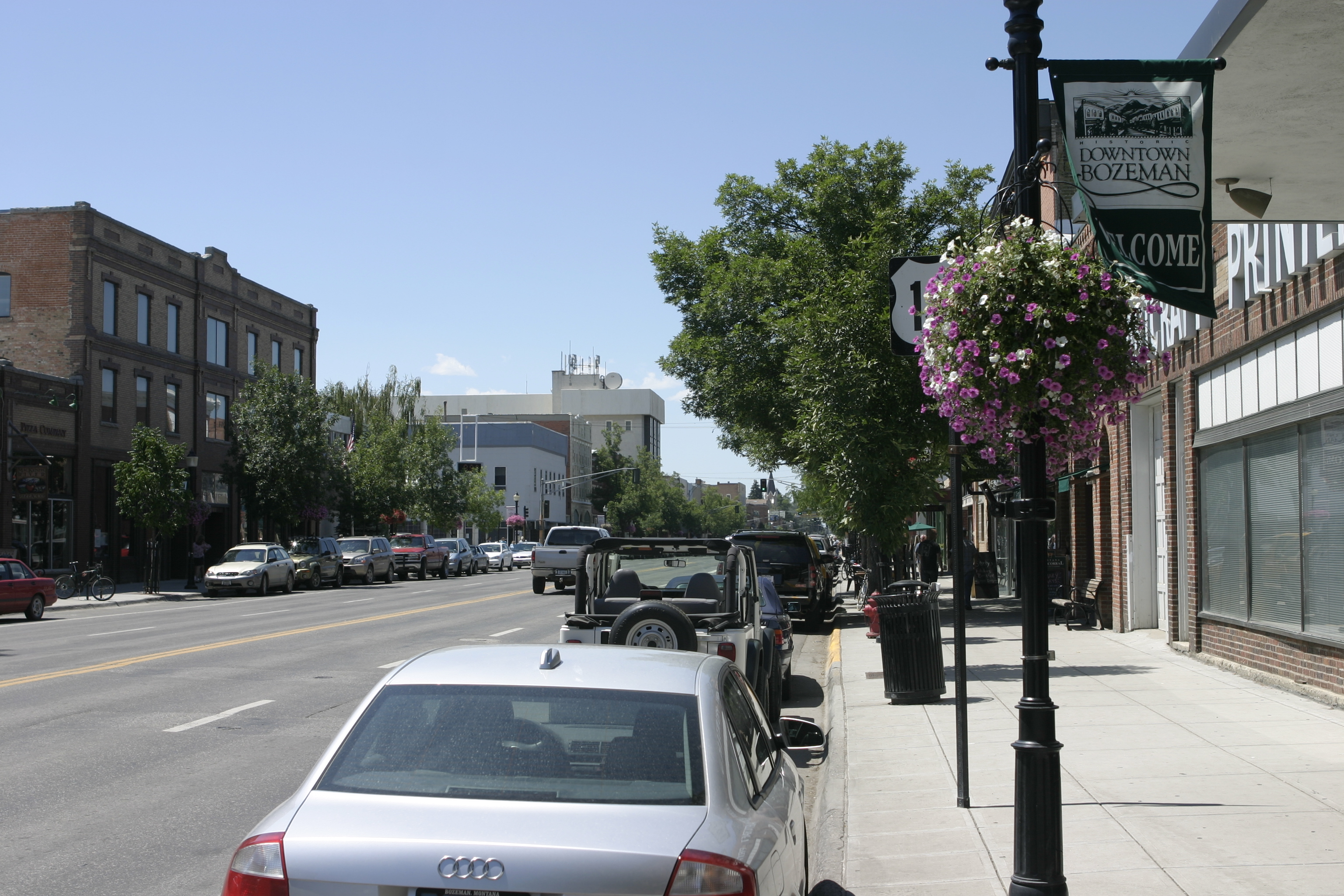
Downtown Bozeman, Montana's fourth largest municipality by population

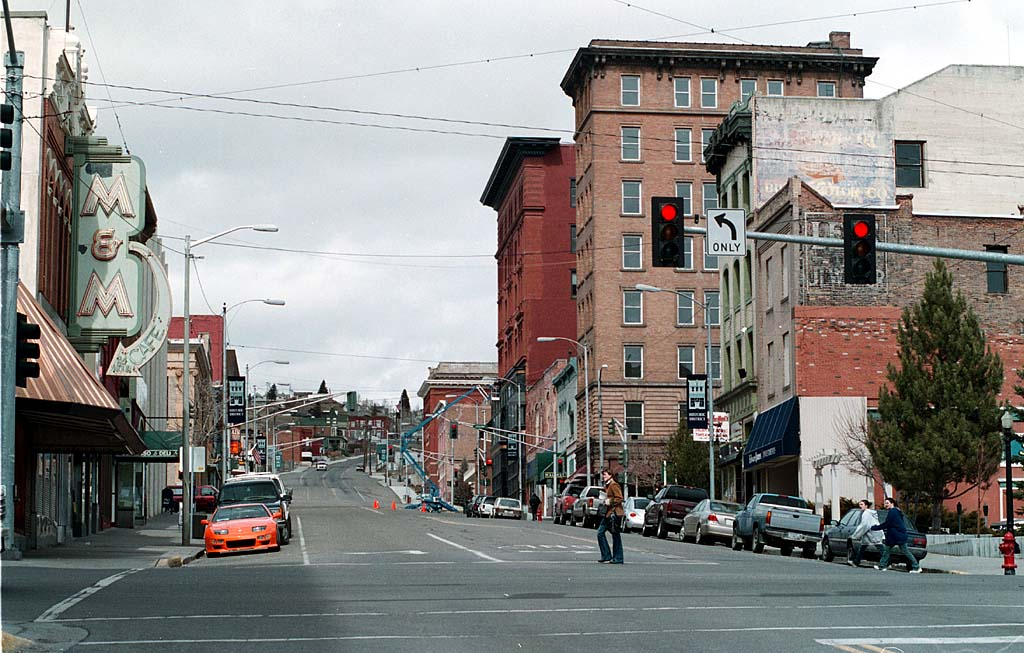
Uptown Butte, fifth largest municipality by population in Montana

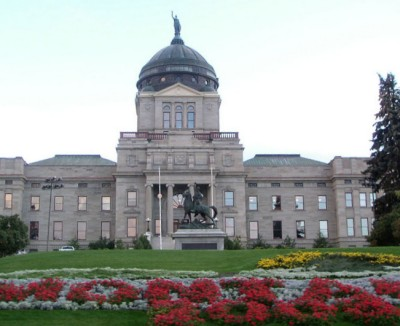
Montana State Capitol in Helena, capital city of Montana

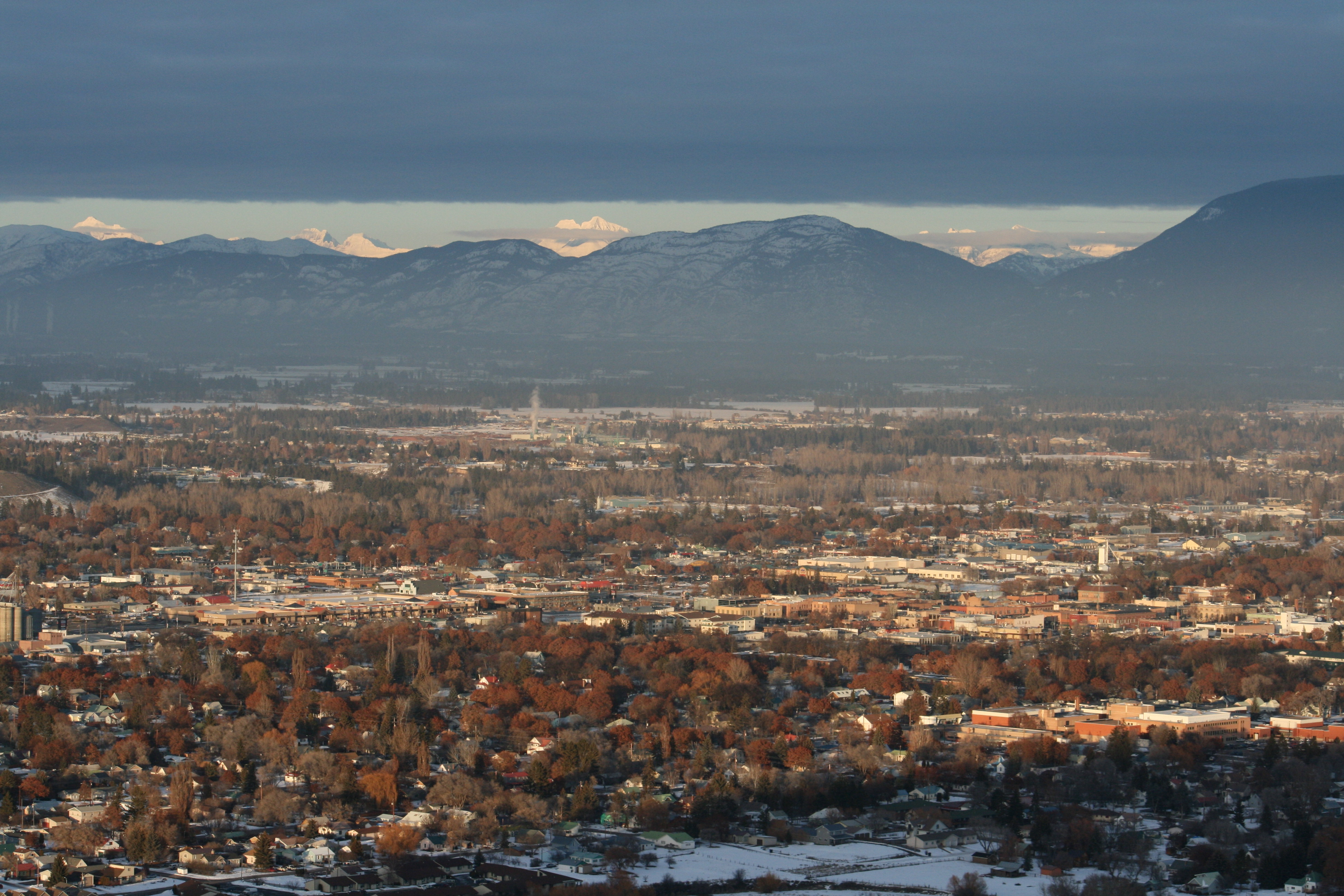
Kalispell, looking toward Glacier National Park

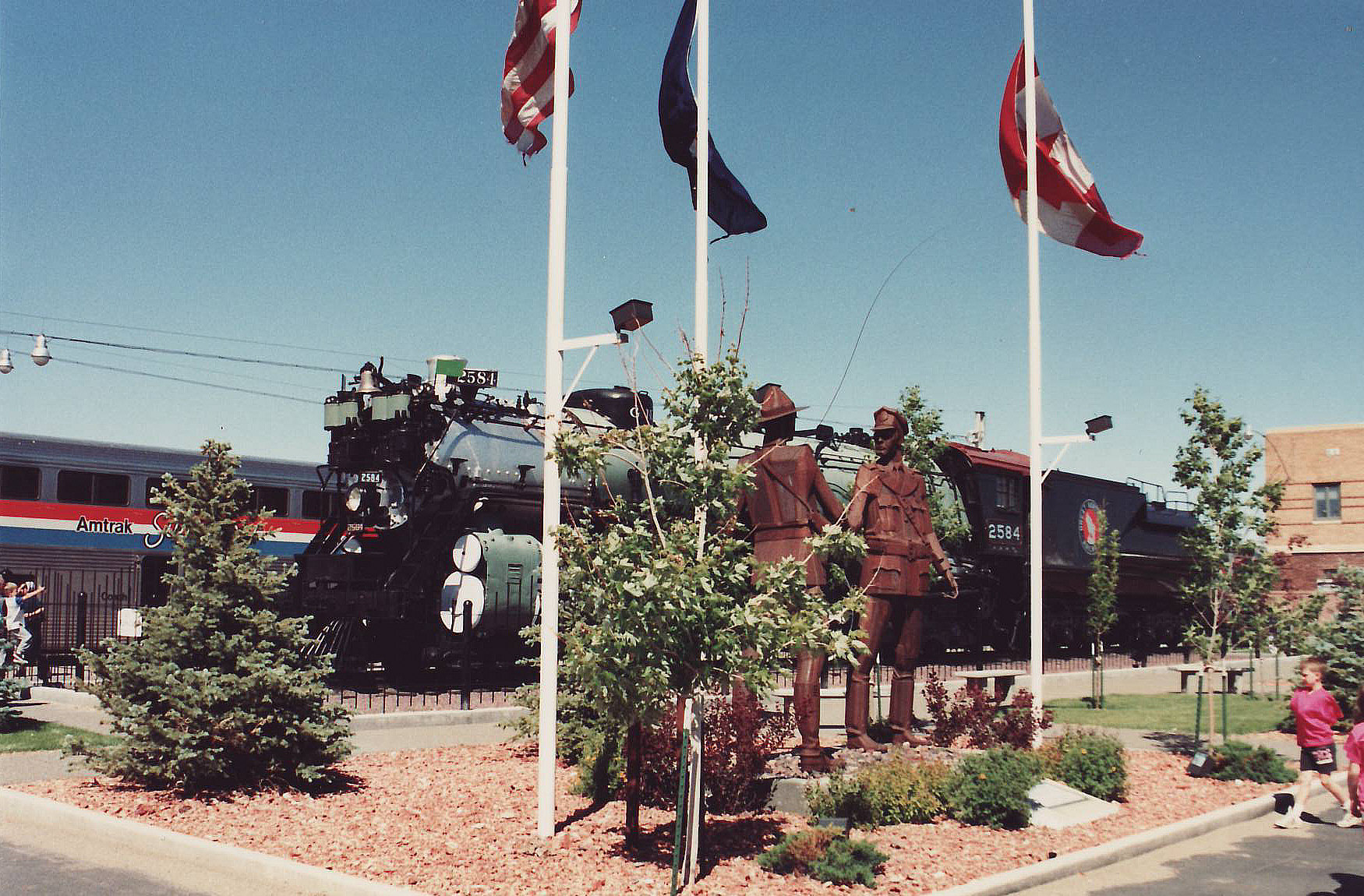
Havre railroad station and the sculpture "U.S. − Canada Friendship"

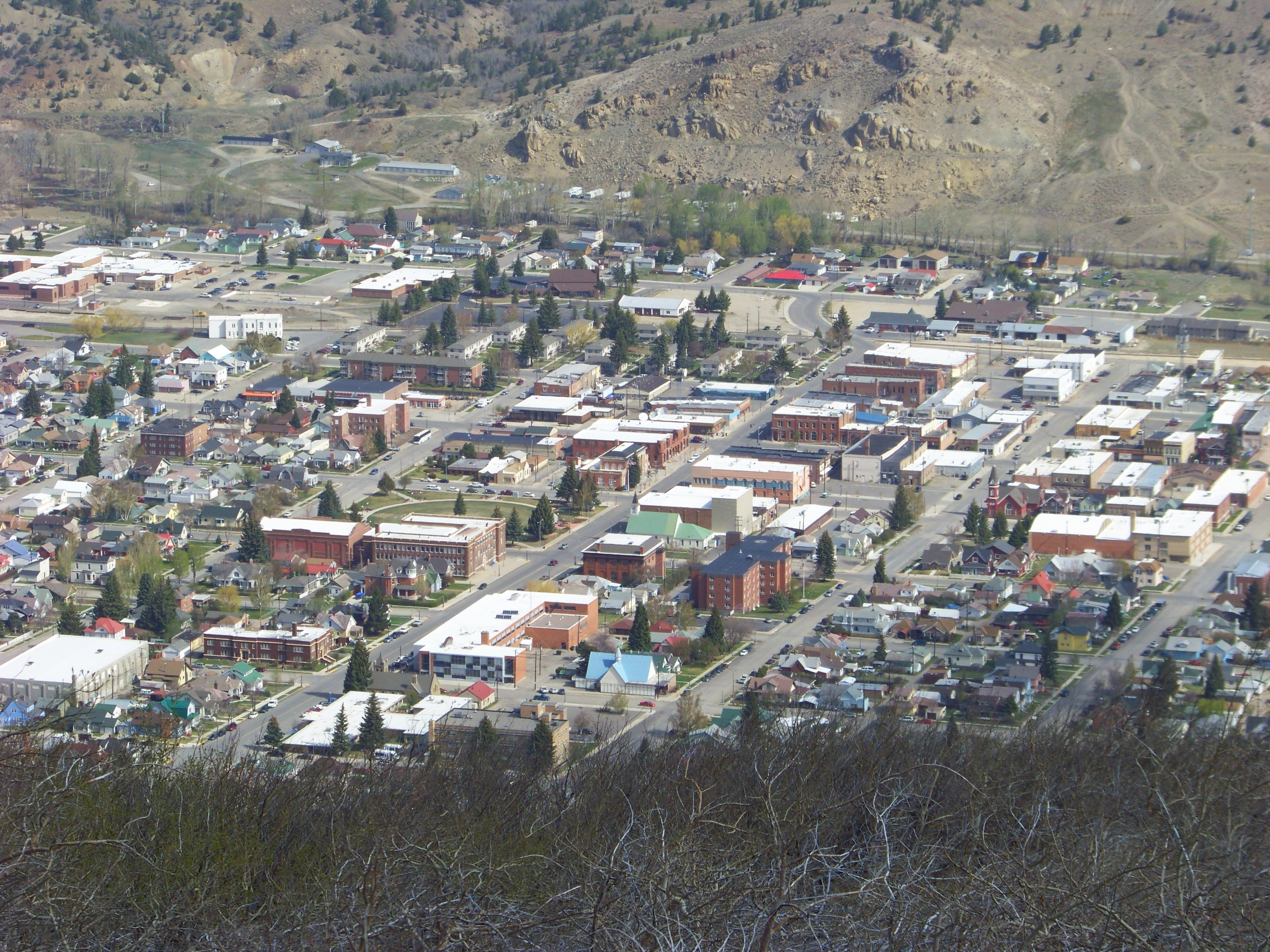
Downtown Anaconda, the largest city in Montana by land area

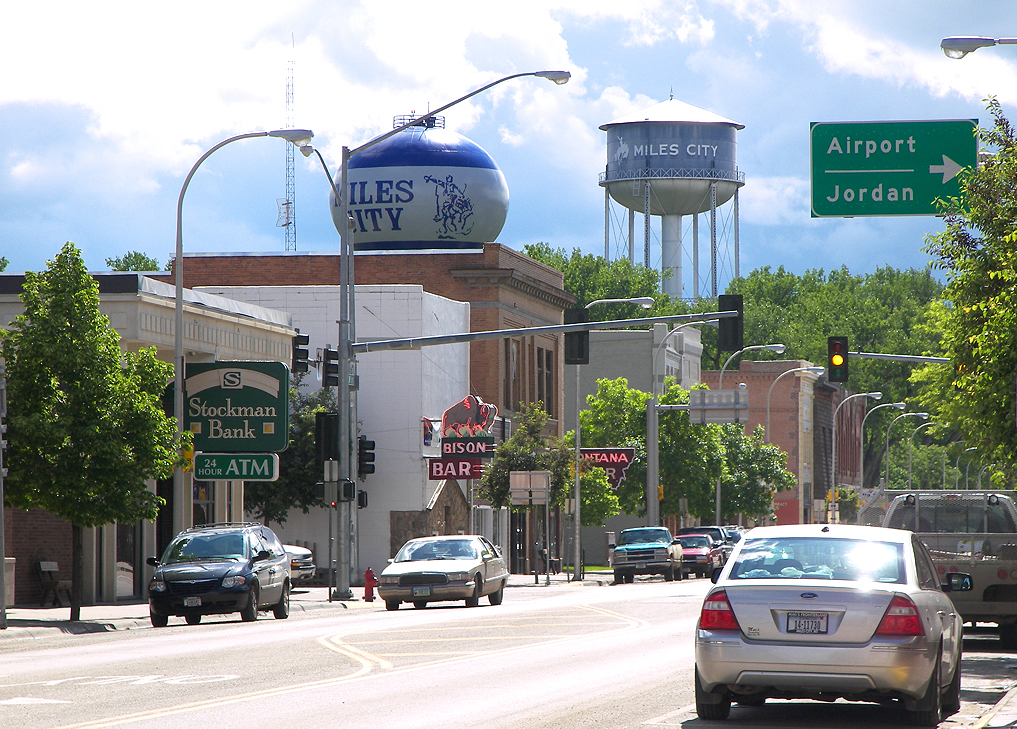
Downtown Miles City, Montana's eleventh largest municipality by population

† County seat

‡ State capital and county seat

Name	Type	County	Population (2020)	Population (2010)	Change	Land area (2010)		Population density
Name	Type	County	Population (2020)	Population (2010)	Change	sq mi	km^{2}	Population density
Alberton	Town	Mineral	452	420	+7.6%	0.57	1.5	793.0/sq mi (306.2/km^{2})
Anaconda†	Consolidated city-county	Deer Lodge	9,421	9,298	+1.3%	736.53	1,907.6	12.8/sq mi (4.9/km^{2})
Bainville	Town	Roosevelt	271	208	+30.3%	1.02	2.6	265.7/sq mi (102.6/km^{2})
Baker†	City	Fallon	1,802	1,741	+3.5%	0.97	2.5	1,857.7/sq mi (717.3/km^{2})
Bearcreek	Town	Carbon	91	79	+15.2%	0.12	0.31	758.3/sq mi (292.8/km^{2})
Belgrade	City	Gallatin	10,460	7,389	+41.6%	3.25	8.4	3,218.5/sq mi (1,242.7/km^{2})
Belt	Town	Cascade	510	597	−14.6%	0.35	0.91	1,457.1/sq mi (562.6/km^{2})
Big Sandy	Town	Chouteau	605	598	+1.2%	0.44	1.1	1,375.0/sq mi (530.9/km^{2})
Big Timber†	City	Sweet Grass	1,650	1,641	+0.5%	0.92	2.4	1,793.5/sq mi (692.5/km^{2})
Billings†	City	Yellowstone	117,116	104,170	+12.4%	43.41	112.4	2,697.9/sq mi (1,041.7/km^{2})
Boulder†	Town	Jefferson	1,201	1,183	+1.5%	1.13	2.9	1,062.8/sq mi (410.4/km^{2})
Bozeman†	City	Gallatin	53,293	37,280	+43.0%	19.12	49.5	2,787.3/sq mi (1,076.2/km^{2})
Bridger	Town	Carbon	662	708	−6.5%	0.80	2.1	827.5/sq mi (319.5/km^{2})
Broadus†	Town	Powder River	456	468	−2.6%	0.34	0.88	1,341.2/sq mi (517.8/km^{2})
Broadview	Town	Yellowstone	139	192	−27.6%	0.26	0.67	534.6/sq mi (206.4/km^{2})
Browning	Town	Glacier	1,018	1,016	+0.2%	0.27	0.70	3,770.4/sq mi (1,455.7/km^{2})
Butte†	Consolidated city-county	Silver Bow	34,494	33,525	+2.9%	716.25	1,855.1	48.2/sq mi (18.6/km^{2})
Cascade	Town	Cascade	600	685	−12.4%	0.52	1.3	1,153.8/sq mi (445.5/km^{2})
Chester†	Town	Liberty	847	847	0.0%	0.48	1.2	1,764.6/sq mi (681.3/km^{2})
Chinook†	City	Blaine	1,185	1,203	−1.5%	0.51	1.3	2,323.5/sq mi (897.1/km^{2})
Choteau†	City	Teton	1,721	1,684	+2.2%	1.83	4.7	940.4/sq mi (363.1/km^{2})
Circle†	Town	McCone	591	615	−3.9%	0.78	2.0	757.7/sq mi (292.5/km^{2})
Clyde Park	Town	Park	332	288	+15.3%	0.32	0.83	1,037.5/sq mi (400.6/km^{2})
Colstrip	City	Rosebud	2,096	2,214	−5.3%	4.47	11.6	468.9/sq mi (181.0/km^{2})
Columbia Falls	City	Flathead	5,308	4,688	+13.2%	2.05	5.3	2,589.3/sq mi (999.7/km^{2})
Columbus†	Town	Stillwater	1,857	1,893	−1.9%	1.32	3.4	1,406.8/sq mi (543.2/km^{2})
Conrad†	City	Pondera	2,318	2,570	−9.8%	1.25	3.2	1,854.4/sq mi (716.0/km^{2})
Culbertson	Town	Roosevelt	753	714	+5.5%	0.60	1.6	1,255.0/sq mi (484.6/km^{2})
Cut Bank†	City	Glacier	3,056	2,869	+6.5%	0.99	2.6	3,086.9/sq mi (1,191.8/km^{2})
Darby	Town	Ravalli	783	720	+8.7%	0.58	1.5	1,350.0/sq mi (521.2/km^{2})
Deer Lodge†	City	Powell	2,938	3,111	−5.6%	1.44	3.7	2,040.3/sq mi (787.8/km^{2})
Denton	Town	Fergus	205	255	−19.6%	0.76	2.0	269.7/sq mi (104.1/km^{2})
Dillon†	City	Beaverhead	3,880	4,134	−6.1%	1.76	4.6	2,204.5/sq mi (851.2/km^{2})
Dodson	Town	Phillips	125	124	+0.8%	0.19	0.49	657.9/sq mi (254.0/km^{2})
Drummond	Town	Granite	272	309	−12.0%	0.53	1.4	513.2/sq mi (198.2/km^{2})
Dutton	Town	Teton	303	316	−4.1%	0.31	0.80	977.4/sq mi (377.4/km^{2})
East Helena	City	Lewis and Clark	1,944	1,984	−2.0%	1.73	4.5	1,123.7/sq mi (433.9/km^{2})
Ekalaka†	Town	Carter	399	332	+20.2%	1.04	2.7	383.7/sq mi (148.1/km^{2})
Ennis	Town	Madison	917	838	+9.4%	0.77	2.0	1,190.9/sq mi (459.8/km^{2})
Eureka	Town	Lincoln	1,380	1,037	+33.1%	1.01	2.6	1,366.3/sq mi (527.5/km^{2})
Fairfield	Town	Teton	759	708	+7.2%	0.31	0.80	2,448.4/sq mi (945.3/km^{2})
Fairview	Town	Richland	896	840	+6.7%	0.97	2.5	923.7/sq mi (356.6/km^{2})
Flaxville	Town	Daniels	63	71	−11.3%	0.10	0.26	630.0/sq mi (243.2/km^{2})
Forsyth†	City	Rosebud	1,647	1,777	−7.3%	0.99	2.6	1,663.6/sq mi (642.3/km^{2})
Fort Benton†	City	Chouteau	1,449	1,464	−1.0%	2.07	5.4	700.0/sq mi (270.3/km^{2})
Fort Peck	Town	Valley	239	233	+2.6%	0.86	2.2	277.9/sq mi (107.3/km^{2})
Froid	Town	Roosevelt	195	185	+5.4%	0.28	0.73	696.4/sq mi (268.9/km^{2})
Fromberg	Town	Carbon	392	438	−10.5%	0.48	1.2	816.7/sq mi (315.3/km^{2})
Geraldine	Town	Chouteau	207	261	−20.7%	0.52	1.3	398.1/sq mi (153.7/km^{2})
Glasgow†	City	Valley	3,202	3,250	−1.5%	1.43	3.7	2,239.2/sq mi (864.5/km^{2})
Glendive†	City	Dawson	4,873	4,935	−1.3%	3.32	8.6	1,467.8/sq mi (566.7/km^{2})
Grass Range	Town	Fergus	110	110	0.0%	0.15	0.39	733.3/sq mi (283.1/km^{2})
Great Falls†	City	Cascade	60,442	58,505	+3.3%	21.79	56.4	2,773.8/sq mi (1,071.0/km^{2})
Hamilton†	City	Ravalli	4,659	4,348	+7.2%	2.53	6.6	1,841.5/sq mi (711.0/km^{2})
Hardin†	City	Big Horn	3,818	3,505	+8.9%	2.57	6.7	1,485.6/sq mi (573.6/km^{2})
Harlem	City	Blaine	769	808	−4.8%	0.43	1.1	1,788.4/sq mi (690.5/km^{2})
Harlowton†	City	Wheatland	955	997	−4.2%	0.58	1.5	1,646.6/sq mi (635.7/km^{2})
Havre†	City	Hill	9,362	9,310	+0.6%	3.28	8.5	2,854.3/sq mi (1,102.0/km^{2})
Helena‡	City	Lewis and Clark	32,091	28,190	+13.8%	16.35	42.3	1,962.8/sq mi (757.8/km^{2})
Hingham	Town	Hill	131	118	+11.0%	0.17	0.44	770.6/sq mi (297.5/km^{2})
Hobson	City	Judith Basin	179	215	−16.7%	0.24	0.62	745.8/sq mi (288.0/km^{2})
Hot Springs	Town	Sanders	557	544	+2.4%	0.38	0.98	1,465.8/sq mi (565.9/km^{2})
Hysham†	Town	Treasure	276	312	−11.5%	0.21	0.54	1,314.3/sq mi (507.4/km^{2})
Ismay	Town	Custer	17	19	−10.5%	0.42	1.1	40.5/sq mi (15.6/km^{2})
Joliet	Town	Carbon	577	595	−3.0%	0.30	0.78	1,923.3/sq mi (742.6/km^{2})
Jordan†	Town	Garfield	356	343	+3.8%	0.34	0.88	1,047.1/sq mi (404.3/km^{2})
Judith Gap	City	Wheatland	110	126	−12.7%	0.38	0.98	289.5/sq mi (111.8/km^{2})
Kalispell†	City	Flathead	24,558	19,927	+23.2%	11.64	30.1	1,711.9/sq mi (661.0/km^{2})
Kevin	Town	Toole	154	154	0.0%	0.34	0.88	452.9/sq mi (174.9/km^{2})
Laurel	City	Yellowstone	7,222	6,718	+7.5%	2.14	5.5	3,374.8/sq mi (1,303.0/km^{2})
Lavina	Town	Golden Valley	136	187	−27.3%	1.00	2.6	136.0/sq mi (52.5/km^{2})
Lewistown†	City	Fergus	5,952	5,901	+0.9%	5.32	13.8	1,118.8/sq mi (432.0/km^{2})
Libby†	City	Lincoln	2,775	2,628	+5.6%	1.91	4.9	1,452.9/sq mi (561.0/km^{2})
Lima	Town	Beaverhead	212	221	−4.1%	0.53	1.4	400.0/sq mi (154.4/km^{2})
Livingston†	City	Park	8,040	7,044	+14.1%	6.02	15.6	1,335.5/sq mi (515.7/km^{2})
Lodge Grass	Town	Big Horn	441	428	+3.0%	0.24	0.62	1,837.5/sq mi (709.5/km^{2})
Malta†	City	Phillips	1,860	1,997	−6.9%	1.06	2.7	1,754.7/sq mi (677.5/km^{2})
Manhattan	Town	Gallatin	2,086	1,520	+37.2%	1.93	5.0	1,080.8/sq mi (417.3/km^{2})
Medicine Lake	Town	Sheridan	244	225	+8.4%	0.40	1.0	610.0/sq mi (235.5/km^{2})
Melstone	Town	Musselshell	126	96	+31.3%	0.69	1.8	182.6/sq mi (70.5/km^{2})
Miles City†	City	Custer	8,354	8,410	−0.7%	3.34	8.7	2,501.2/sq mi (965.7/km^{2})
Missoula†	City	Missoula	73,489	66,788	+10.0%	27.51	71.3	2,671.4/sq mi (1,031.4/km^{2})
Moore	Town	Fergus	194	193	+0.5%	0.24	0.62	808.3/sq mi (312.1/km^{2})
Nashua	Town	Valley	301	290	+3.8%	0.66	1.7	456.1/sq mi (176.1/km^{2})
Neihart	Town	Cascade	43	51	−15.7%	1.99	5.2	21.6/sq mi (8.3/km^{2})
Opheim	Town	Valley	75	85	−11.8%	0.21	0.54	357.1/sq mi (137.9/km^{2})
Outlook	Town	Sheridan	84	47	+78.7%	1.30	3.4	64.6/sq mi (24.9/km^{2})
Philipsburg†	Town	Granite	841	820	+2.6%	0.80	2.1	1,051.3/sq mi (405.9/km^{2})
Pinesdale	Town	Ravalli	805	917	−12.2%	1.29	3.3	624.0/sq mi (240.9/km^{2})
Plains	Town	Sanders	1,106	1,048	+5.5%	0.59	1.5	1,874.6/sq mi (723.8/km^{2})
Plentywood†	City	Sheridan	1,669	1,734	−3.7%	1.17	3.0	1,426.5/sq mi (550.8/km^{2})
Plevna	Town	Fallon	179	162	+10.5%	0.59	1.5	303.4/sq mi (117.1/km^{2})
Polson†	City	Lake	5,148	4,488	+14.7%	4.14	10.7	1,243.5/sq mi (480.1/km^{2})
Poplar	City	Roosevelt	758	810	−6.4%	0.28	0.73	2,707.1/sq mi (1,045.2/km^{2})
Red Lodge†	City	Carbon	2,257	2,125	+6.2%	2.80	7.3	806.1/sq mi (311.2/km^{2})
Rexford	Town	Lincoln	78	105	−25.7%	0.10	0.26	780.0/sq mi (301.2/km^{2})
Richey	Town	Dawson	164	177	−7.3%	0.24	0.62	683.3/sq mi (263.8/km^{2})
Ronan	City	Lake	1,955	1,871	+4.5%	1.19	3.1	1,642.9/sq mi (634.3/km^{2})
Roundup†	City	Musselshell	1,742	1,788	−2.6%	1.34	3.5	1,300.0/sq mi (501.9/km^{2})
Ryegate†	Town	Golden Valley	223	245	−9.0%	0.69	1.8	323.2/sq mi (124.8/km^{2})
Saco	Town	Phillips	159	197	−19.3%	0.33	0.85	481.8/sq mi (186.0/km^{2})
Scobey†	City	Daniels	999	1,017	−1.8%	0.76	2.0	1,314.5/sq mi (507.5/km^{2})
Shelby†	City	Toole	3,169	3,376	−6.1%	6.03	15.6	525.5/sq mi (202.9/km^{2})
Sheridan	Town	Madison	694	642	+8.1%	1.02	2.6	680.4/sq mi (262.7/km^{2})
Sidney†	City	Richland	6,346	5,191	+22.3%	2.66	6.9	2,385.7/sq mi (921.1/km^{2})
St. Ignatius	Town	Lake	768	842	−8.8%	0.56	1.5	1,371.4/sq mi (529.5/km^{2})
Stanford†	Town	Judith Basin	403	401	+0.5%	0.44	1.1	915.9/sq mi (353.6/km^{2})
Stevensville	Town	Ravalli	2,002	1,809	+10.7%	0.98	2.5	2,042.9/sq mi (788.8/km^{2})
Sunburst	Town	Toole	333	375	−11.2%	0.24	0.62	1,387.5/sq mi (535.7/km^{2})
Superior†	Town	Mineral	830	812	+2.2%	1.04	2.7	798.1/sq mi (308.1/km^{2})
Terry†	Town	Prairie	562	605	−7.1%	0.71	1.8	791.5/sq mi (305.6/km^{2})
Thompson Falls†	City	Sanders	1,336	1,313	+1.8%	1.73	4.5	772.3/sq mi (298.2/km^{2})
Three Forks	City	Gallatin	1,989	1,869	+6.4%	1.44	3.7	1,381.3/sq mi (533.3/km^{2})
Townsend†	City	Broadwater	1,787	1,878	−4.8%	1.58	4.1	1,131.0/sq mi (436.7/km^{2})
Troy	City	Lincoln	797	938	−15.0%	0.76	2.0	1,048.7/sq mi (404.9/km^{2})
Twin Bridges	Town	Madison	330	375	−12.0%	0.96	2.5	343.8/sq mi (132.7/km^{2})
Valier	Town	Pondera	530	509	+4.1%	0.92	2.4	576.1/sq mi (222.4/km^{2})
Virginia City†	Town	Madison	219	190	+15.3%	0.95	2.5	230.5/sq mi (89.0/km^{2})
Walkerville	Town	Silver Bow	639	675	−5.3%	2.23	5.8	286.5/sq mi (110.6/km^{2})
West Yellowstone	Town	Gallatin	1,272	1,271	+0.1%	0.80	2.1	1,590.0/sq mi (613.9/km^{2})
Westby	Town	Sheridan	167	168	−0.6%	0.54	1.4	309.3/sq mi (119.4/km^{2})
White Sulphur Springs†	City	Meagher	955	939	+1.7%	1.01	2.6	945.5/sq mi (365.1/km^{2})
Whitefish	City	Flathead	7,751	6,357	+21.9%	6.43	16.7	1,205.4/sq mi (465.4/km^{2})
Whitehall	Town	Jefferson	1,006	1,038	−3.1%	0.67	1.7	1,501.5/sq mi (579.7/km^{2})
Wibaux†	Town	Wibaux	462	589	−21.6%	1.08	2.8	427.8/sq mi (165.2/km^{2})
Winifred	Town	Fergus	172	208	−17.3%	0.50	1.3	344.0/sq mi (132.8/km^{2})
Winnett†	Town	Petroleum	188	182	+3.3%	0.98	2.5	191.8/sq mi (74.1/km^{2})
Wolf Point†	City	Roosevelt	2,517	2,621	−4.0%	0.87	2.3	2,893.1/sq mi (1,117.0/km^{2})
Total towns	76	—	38,130	37,333	+2.1%	49.01	126.9	778.0/sq mi (300.4/km^{2})
Total cities	53	—	549,663	494,659	+11.1%	1,685.57	4,365.6	326.1/sq mi (125.9/km^{2})
Total	129	—	587,793	531,992	+10.5%	1,734.58	4,492.5	338.9/sq mi (130.8/km^{2})

== See also ==
- List of census-designated places in Montana
- List of counties in Montana
- List of ghost towns in Montana
- List of places in Montana
