= KPWD =

KPWD may refer to:

- Karnataka Public Works Department
- Kerala Public Works Department
- KPWD (FM), a radio station (91.7 FM) licensed to serve Lefors, Texas, United States; see List of radio stations in Texas
- Sher-Wood Airport (ICAO code), airport in Plentywood, Montana
