= KATQ =

KATQ may refer to:

- KATQ (AM), a radio station (1070 AM) licensed to Plentywood, Montana, United States
- KATQ-FM, a radio station (100.1 FM) licensed to Plentywood, Montana, United States
