= Montana Highway 5 =

State highway in Montana, United States

Montana Highway 5
- MT 5 highlighted in red

Route information
- Maintained by MDT
- Length: 65.573 mi (105.530 km)

Major junctions
- West end: MT 13 in Scobey
- MT 16 in Plentywood
- East end: ND 5 in Westby

Location
- Country: United States
- State: Montana
- Counties: Daniels, Sheridan

Highway system
- Montana Highway System; Interstate; US; State; Secondary
← MT 3	→ MT 7

Montana Highway 5 (MT 5) is a 65.573-mile-long (105.530 km) state highway connecting with North Dakota's Highway 5, the 337 mile long ND highway. MT 5 runs from the ND border to Scobey, Montana. It was designated in 1939. The road closely follows the topographic contours of the land and, in the extreme winter climate of northeastern Montana, this often leads to road closures due to drifting snow.

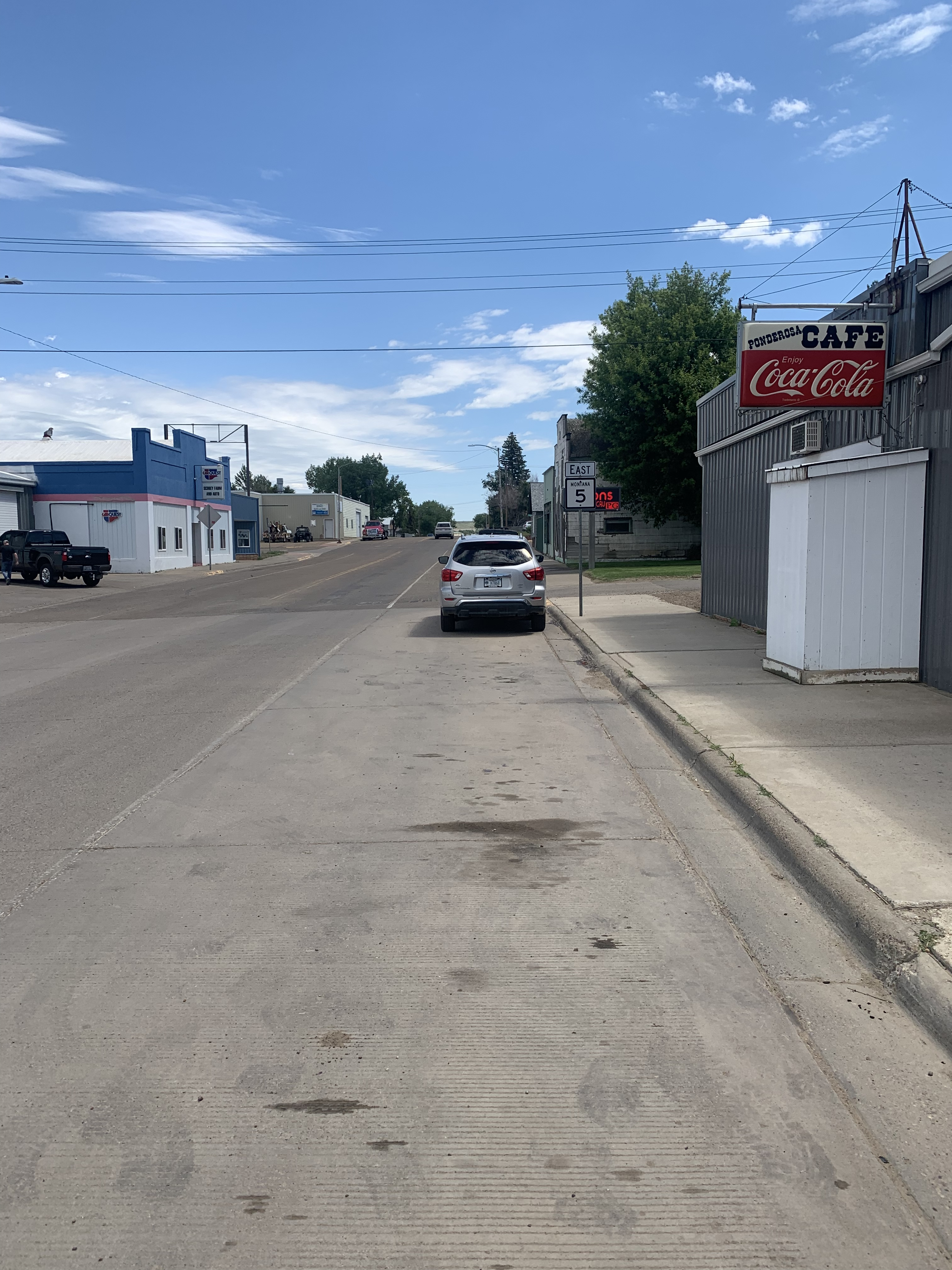
Montana Highway 5 in Scobey, Montana

== Major intersections ==
County	Location	mi	km	Destinations	Notes
Daniels	Scobey	0.000	0.000	MT 13 – Wolf Point, Canada	
Daniels	Flaxville	11.404	18.353	S-251 south / S-511 north – Flaxville, Whitetail	
Sheridan		30.367	48.871	S-374 north – Outlook	
Sheridan	Plentywood	41.163	66.245	MT 16 north – Raymond, Regina	West end of MT 16 overlap
Sheridan	Plentywood	43.190	69.508	MT 16 south – Culbertson	East end of MT 16 overlap
Sheridan	Westby	65.573	105.530	ND 5 east – Crosby, N.D.	Continuation into North Dakota
1.000 mi = 1.609 km; 1.000 km = 0.621 mi: Concurrency terminus
