= KCGM =

KCGM may refer to:

- KCGM (FM) a radio station in Scobey, Montana.
- Kalgoorlie Consolidated Gold Mines Pty Ltd a subsidiary of Northern Star Resources that operates the Super Pit gold mine in Kalgoorlie, Western Australia
