= Peerless, Montana =

- Unincorporated community
- Location within Montana Location within the United States
- Coordinates: 48°46′56″N 105°49′50″W
- Country: United States
- State: Montana
- County: Daniels

Area
  - Total: 0.16 sq mi (0.41 km^{2})
  - Land: 0.16 sq mi (0.41 km^{2})
  - Water: 0 sq mi (0.00 km^{2})
- Elevation: 2,851 ft (869 m)

Population (2020)
  - Total: 23
  - Density: 147/sq mi (56.6/km^{2})
- Time zone: UTC-7 (Mountain (MST))
  - Summer (DST): UTC-6 (MDT)
- ZIP code: 59253
- Area code: 406
- GNIS feature ID: 2804279

Peerless is an unincorporated community in Daniels County, Montana, United States. As of the 2020 census, Peerless had a population of 23. Peerless is 19 miles (31 km) west of Scobey. The community has a post office with ZIP code 59253.

The post office opened under the name Tande in 1914. In 1925 when the Great Northern Railway extended its branch line west from Scobey the town moved to be closer to the railroad. At this time it was renamed Peerless, named for Schlitz-Peerless beer.

== Demographics ==
Historical population
Census	Pop.	Note	%±
2020	23		—
U.S. Decennial Census

== Media ==
The Daniels County Leader is the local newspaper. They publish both print and online news editions.
