= Outlook station =

Outlook station could refer to:

- Outlook station (Montana), a historic railway depot in Outlook, Sheridan County, Montana, US
- Outlook station (Saskatchewan), a former railway station in the town of Outlook, Saskatchewan, Canada
