= Mansfield A. Daniels House =

Historic house in Montana, United States

- U.S. National Register of Historic Places
- Location within Montana Location within the United States
- Location: Approximately 2 miles west of Montana Highway 13 and 2 miles southwest of Scobey
- Coordinates: 48°46′23″N 105°27′51″W
- Area: 3 acres (1.2 ha)
- Built: 1912
- Architect: Mansfield A. Daniels
- Architectural style: Bungalow/Craftsman
- NRHP reference No.: 97000503
- Added to NRHP: June 4, 1997

The Mansfield A. Daniels House is a historic house located 2 miles southwest of Scobey in Daniels County, Montana. It was added to the National Register of Historic Places on June 4, 1997.

== Description and history ==
Built in 1912, it is a 2 1/2-story single dwelling residence of frame construction in the Craftsman style. The layout of the house is essentially a square main block with a cross-gabled roof, and a projecting rear wing. The interior is still finished in the original oak flooring, windows, and doors, as well as tin ceilings some rooms and on portions of the kitchen walls.

It was built by/for Mansfield A. Daniels, the namesake of Daniels County.
