= Scobey Airport =

- IATA: none; ICAO: none; FAA LID: 9S2

Summary
- Airport type: Public
- Owner: City of Scobey & Daniels County
- Serves: Scobey, Montana
- Elevation AMSL: 2,432 ft / 741 m
- Coordinates: 48°48′28″N 105°26′22″W
- Interactive map of Scobey Airport

Runways
Direction	Length		Surface
Direction	ft	m	Surface
12/30	4,015	1,224	Asphalt

Statistics (2006)
- Aircraft operations: 4,450
- Source: Federal Aviation Administration

Scobey Airport (FAA LID: 9S2) is a public airport located one mile (2 km) northwest of the central business district of Scobey, a city in Daniels County, Montana, United States. It is owned by the City of Scobey and Daniels County.

== Facilities and aircraft ==
Scobey Airport covers an area of 175 acres (71 ha) and has one runway designated 12/30 with a 4,015 x 75 ft (1,224 x 23 m) asphalt surface. For the 12-month period ending July 25, 2006, the airport had 4,450 aircraft operations, an average of 12 per day: 91% general aviation and 9% air taxi.

== See also ==
- List of airports in Montana
