= KCGM (FM) =

- Scobey, Montana; United States
- Frequency: 95.7 MHz
- Branding: FM 95

Programming
- Format: Country

Ownership
- Owner: Prairie Communications, Inc.

History
- First air date: June 21, 1971
- Call sign meaning: Kids, Cattle, Grain, Minerals

Technical information
- Licensing authority: FCC
- Facility ID: 53311
- Class: C1
- ERP: 52,000 watts
- HAAT: 201 meters (660 feet)
- Transmitter coordinates: 48°48′03″N 105°21′0″W

Links
- Public license information: Public file; LMS
- Website: KCGM Online

KCGM (95.7 FM), "FM 95", is a radio station licensed to serve Daniels County, Montana and surrounding area. The station is owned by Prairie Communications, Inc. Its studios are located at 20 Main Street in Scobey. The transmitter and 400-foot tower are east of town.

It airs a community-oriented full-service Country music format.

The station was assigned the KCGM call letters by the Federal Communications Commission.
