= Outlook station (Montana) =

Outlook
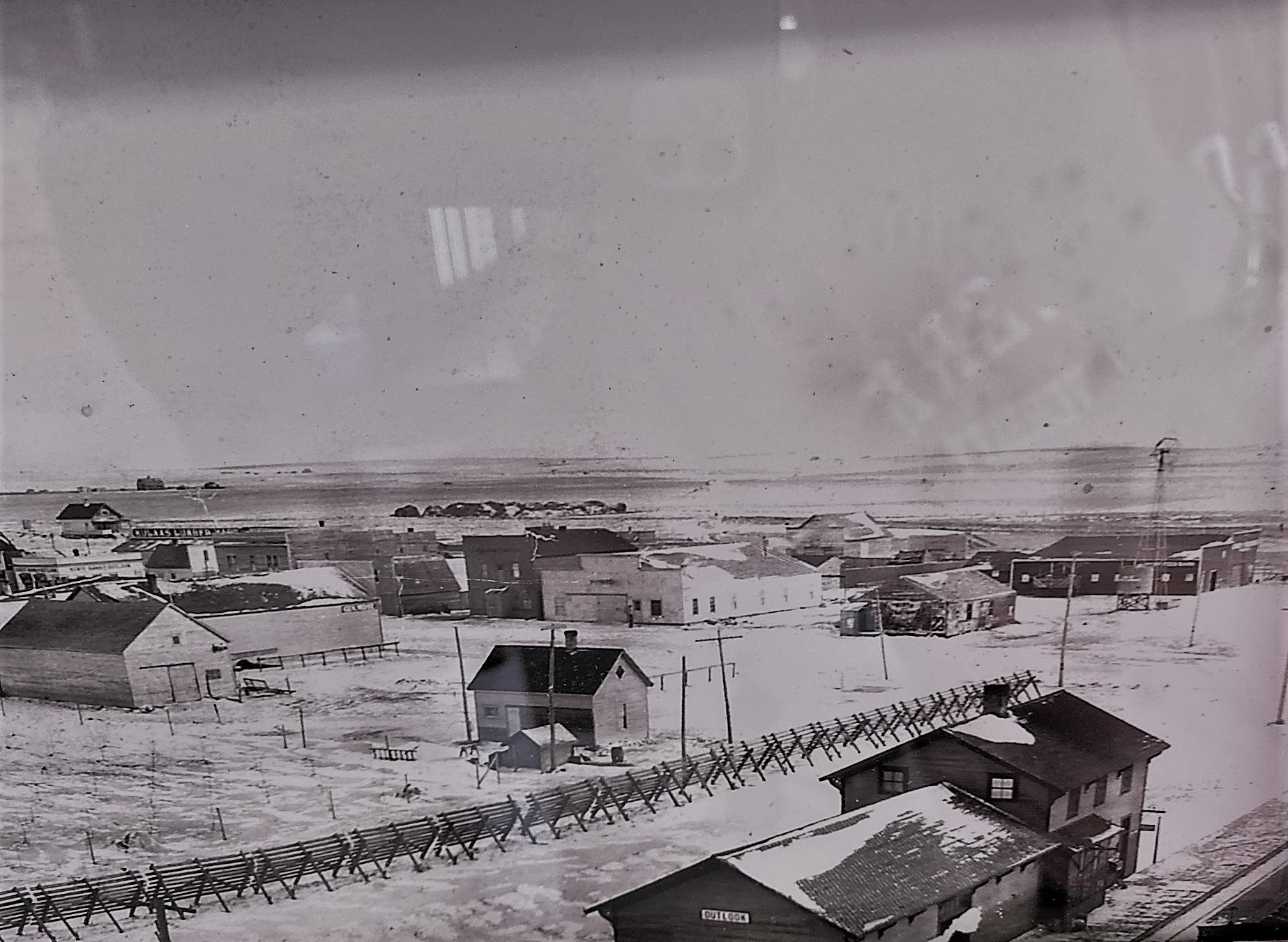
- The depot is in the bottom of the photo

General information
- Location: 916 Outlook Highway, Outlook, Montana 59252
- System: Former Soo Line passenger rail station

History
- Rebuilt: 1913

Services
Preceding station	Soo Line	Following station
Daleview toward Whitetail	Whitetail – Flaxton	Raymond toward Flaxton
- Outlook Depot
- U.S. National Register of Historic Places
- Location within Montana Location within the United States
- Location: South of the western edge of Marr St., south of Block 10 S of western edge of Marr St., S of Block 10, Outlook, Montana
- Coordinates: 48°53′8″N 104°46′37″W
- Area: less than one acre
- MPS: Sheridan County MPS
- NRHP reference No.: 93001144
- Added to NRHP: October 27, 1993
Location

Outlook station is a railway depot in Outlook in Sheridan County, Montana which was listed on the National Register of Historic Places in 1993 as the Outlook Depot. It has also been known as Soo Line Depot. The listing included two contributing buildings.

It was deemed notable as "one of the best-preserved small-town railroad stations in Montana." It is a wood-framed building about 48 by 24 feet (14.6 m × 7.3 m) in plan, which is two stories tall at its eastern end which holds passenger facilities and the railroad agent's quarters, and one story tall at the western, freight room end. It is a standard "second-class" depot built by the Minneapolis, St. Paul, & Sault Ste. Marie Railroad ("the Soo Line") in 1913. In 1993 it was operated by the Dakota, Missouri Valley & Western Railroad. The depot is located on the north side of the east–west railway which runs along the south side of the small town of Outlook (population 109 in 1990).

The station's privy, located to the west of the depot, is the second contributing building.
