= Daniels County Courthouse =

- U.S. National Register of Historic Places
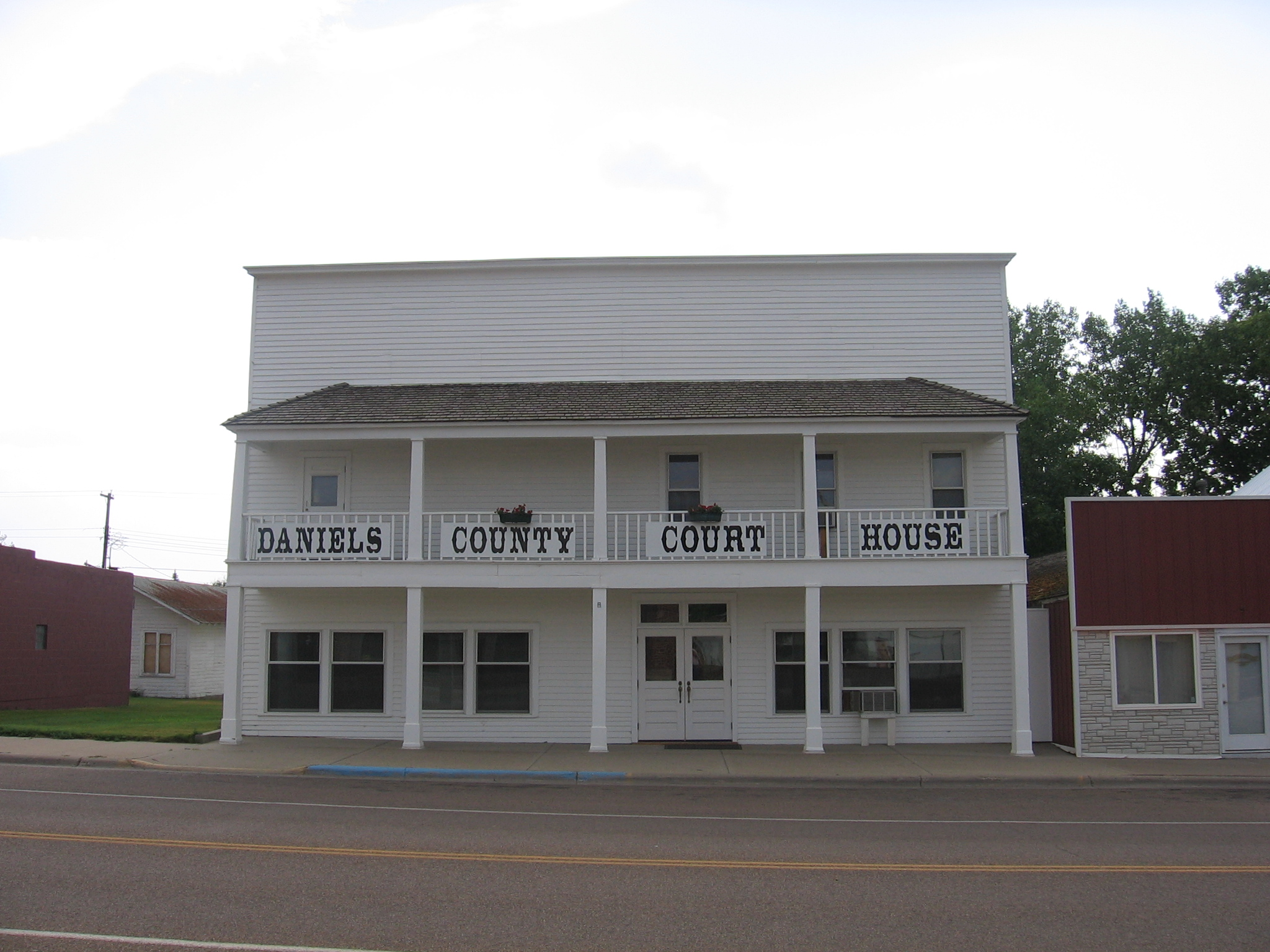
- Daniels County Courthouse

- Location within Montana Location within the United States
- Interactive map showing the location of Daniels County Courthouse
- Location: 213 Main St., Scobey, Montana
- Coordinates: 48°47′27″N 105°25′12″W
- Architectural style: Western false front
- NRHP reference No.: 95000535
- Added to NRHP: May 4, 1995

The Daniels County Courthouse, located at 213 Main Street in Scobey, is the county courthouse serving Daniels County, Montana. The building was erected in 1913, the same year Scobey was relocated to a site on the Great Northern Railway, and originally functioned as a hotel. The two-story building, which had a false front, was the largest in the city at the time. Over the next seven years, the hotel passed through several hands; it became known as "One-eyed Molly's House of Pleasure" after its most notorious proprietor, a glass-eyed woman known as One-Eyed Molly who supposedly ran a brothel from the hotel. When Daniels County was established in 1920, the newly formed county purchased the hotel to use as its courthouse.

The courthouse was added to the National Register of Historic Places on May 4, 1995.
