= Westby, Montana =

- Town
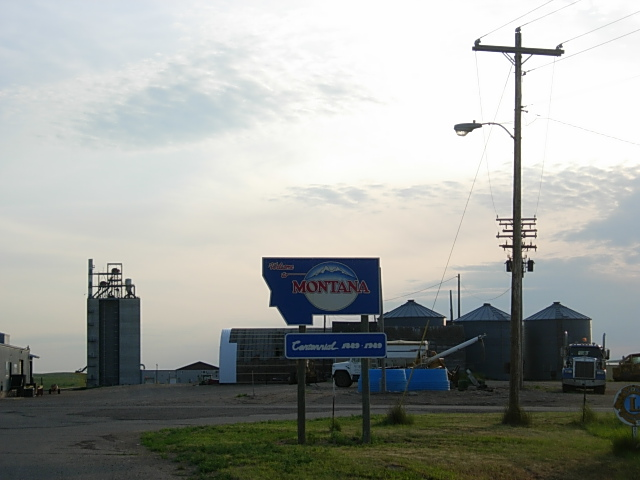
- Montana State Sign in Westby

- Location of Westby, Montana

- Location in the United States
- Coordinates: 48°52′25″N 104°03′18″W
- Country: United States
- State: Montana
- County: Sheridan

Area
  - Total: 0.57 sq mi (1.48 km^{2})
  - Land: 0.56 sq mi (1.46 km^{2})
  - Water: 0.0077 sq mi (0.02 km^{2})
- Elevation: 2,103 ft (641 m)

Population (2020)
  - Total: 167
  - Density: 297.2/sq mi (114.76/km^{2})
- Time zone: UTC-7 (Mountain (MST))
  - Summer (DST): UTC-6 (MDT)
- ZIP code: 59275
- Area code: 406
- FIPS code: 30-78925
- GNIS feature ID: 2413470

Westby is a town in Sheridan County, Montana, United States. The population was 167 at the 2020 census.

== History ==
Westby was founded in 1910 as a town in what was then Williams County, North Dakota (now in Divide County). Danish settlers came up with the name by combining the word west, which noted the town's location in extreme western North Dakota, with the word by, Danish for town. The town remained in North Dakota until 1914, when it was moved slightly across the border so as to be next to a newly built branch line of the Soo Line Railroad and in a state that permitted the sale of alcohol.

== Geography ==
According to the United States Census Bureau, the town has a total area of 0.54 square miles (1.40 km^{2}), all land.

Westby is located on the state border with North Dakota, and near the international boundary with Saskatchewan. Montana Highway 5 passes through the town.

=== Climate ===
According to the Köppen Climate Classification system, Westby has a humid continental climate, abbreviated "DFb" on climate maps.

Climate data for Westby, Montana (1991–2020 normals, extremes 1937–present)
Month	Jan	Feb	Mar	Apr	May	Jun	Jul	Aug	Sep	Oct	Nov	Dec	Year
Record high °F (°C)	55 (13)	66 (19)	77 (25)	91 (33)	102 (39)	103 (39)	112 (44)	108 (42)	103 (39)	92 (33)	73 (23)	61 (16)	112 (44)
Mean maximum °F (°C)	43.1 (6.2)	45.0 (7.2)	60.1 (15.6)	76.6 (24.8)	85.1 (29.5)	90.2 (32.3)	93.4 (34.1)	94.8 (34.9)	90.9 (32.7)	78.0 (25.6)	58.8 (14.9)	44.6 (7.0)	96.9 (36.1)
Mean daily maximum °F (°C)	19.5 (−6.9)	23.5 (−4.7)	35.7 (2.1)	52.6 (11.4)	65.3 (18.5)	73.1 (22.8)	79.9 (26.6)	80.0 (26.7)	69.6 (20.9)	53.5 (11.9)	36.1 (2.3)	23.7 (−4.6)	51.0 (10.6)
Daily mean °F (°C)	8.7 (−12.9)	12.8 (−10.7)	25.0 (−3.9)	39.9 (4.4)	52.4 (11.3)	61.5 (16.4)	67.3 (19.6)	65.9 (18.8)	55.4 (13.0)	41.0 (5.0)	25.4 (−3.7)	13.7 (−10.2)	39.1 (3.9)
Mean daily minimum °F (°C)	−2.2 (−19.0)	2.1 (−16.6)	14.2 (−9.9)	27.3 (−2.6)	39.5 (4.2)	49.9 (9.9)	54.6 (12.6)	51.8 (11.0)	41.1 (5.1)	28.6 (−1.9)	14.6 (−9.7)	3.8 (−15.7)	27.1 (−2.7)
Mean minimum °F (°C)	−27.1 (−32.8)	−19.7 (−28.7)	−10.4 (−23.6)	11.1 (−11.6)	24.2 (−4.3)	39.4 (4.1)	43.9 (6.6)	40.3 (4.6)	26.8 (−2.9)	13.0 (−10.6)	−4.6 (−20.3)	−20.1 (−28.9)	−31.6 (−35.3)
Record low °F (°C)	−45 (−43)	−42 (−41)	−33 (−36)	−18 (−28)	10 (−12)	28 (−2)	35 (2)	29 (−2)	15 (−9)	−6 (−21)	−26 (−32)	−42 (−41)	−45 (−43)
Average precipitation inches (mm)	0.37 (9.4)	0.34 (8.6)	0.55 (14)	0.98 (25)	2.17 (55)	3.14 (80)	2.49 (63)	1.64 (42)	1.26 (32)	0.97 (25)	0.52 (13)	0.48 (12)	14.91 (379)
Source 1: NOAA
Source 2: National Weather Service

== Demographics ==
Historical population
Census	Pop.	Note	%±
1920	253		—
1930	287		13.4%
1940	369		28.6%
1950	396		7.3%
1960	309		−22.0%
1970	287		−7.1%
1980	291		1.4%
1990	253		−13.1%
2000	172		−32.0%
2010	168		−2.3%
2020	167		−0.6%
U.S. Decennial Census

=== 2010 census ===
As of the census of 2010, there were 168 people, 82 households, and 49 families residing in the town. The population density was 311.1 inhabitants per square mile (120.1/km^{2}). There were 114 housing units at an average density of 211.1 per square mile (81.5/km^{2}). The racial makeup of the town was 95.8% White, 2.4% Native American, and 1.8% from two or more races. Hispanic or Latino of any race were 1.8% of the population.

There were 82 households, of which 19.5% had children under the age of 18 living with them, 53.7% were married couples living together, 3.7% had a female householder with no husband present, 2.4% had a male householder with no wife present, and 40.2% were non-families. 36.6% of all households were made up of individuals, and 12.2% had someone living alone who was 65 years of age or older. The average household size was 2.05 and the average family size was 2.67.

The median age in the town was 48.3 years. 19% of residents were under the age of 18; 4.3% were between the ages of 18 and 24; 19.1% were from 25 to 44; 35.1% were from 45 to 64; and 22.6% were 65 years of age or older. The gender makeup of the town was 52.4% male and 47.6% female.

=== 2000 census ===
As of the census of 2000, there were 172 people, 88 households, and 52 families residing in the town. The population density was 317.2 inhabitants per square mile (122.5/km^{2}). There were 121 housing units at an average density of 223.1 per square mile (86.1/km^{2}). The racial makeup of the town was 98.26% White, 1.16% Native American, and 0.58% from two or more races. Hispanic or Latino of any race were 1.74% of the population.

There were 88 households, out of which 14.8% had children under the age of 18 living with them, 51.1% were married couples living together, 5.7% had a female householder with no husband present, and 39.8% were non-families. 35.2% of all households were made up of individuals, and 23.9% had someone living alone who was 65 years of age or older. The average household size was 1.95 and the average family size was 2.47.

In the town, the population was spread out, with 15.1% under the age of 18, 2.9% from 18 to 24, 22.7% from 25 to 44, 34.3% from 45 to 64, and 25.0% who were 65 years of age or older. The median age was 50 years. For every 100 females there were 109.8 males. For every 100 females age 18 and over, there were 105.6 males.

The median income for a household in the town was $32,875, and the median income for a family was $44,583. Males had a median income of $35,625 versus $18,125 for females. The per capita income for the town was $19,438. About 4.7% of families and 9.4% of the population were below the poverty line, including none of those under the age of eighteen and 20.0% of those 65 or over.

== Education ==
The school district is Westby K-12 Schools. Westby School District educates students from kindergarten through 12th grade. Westby High School's team name is Thunder.

== See also ==
- List of municipalities in Montana
