= Flaxville, Montana =

- Town
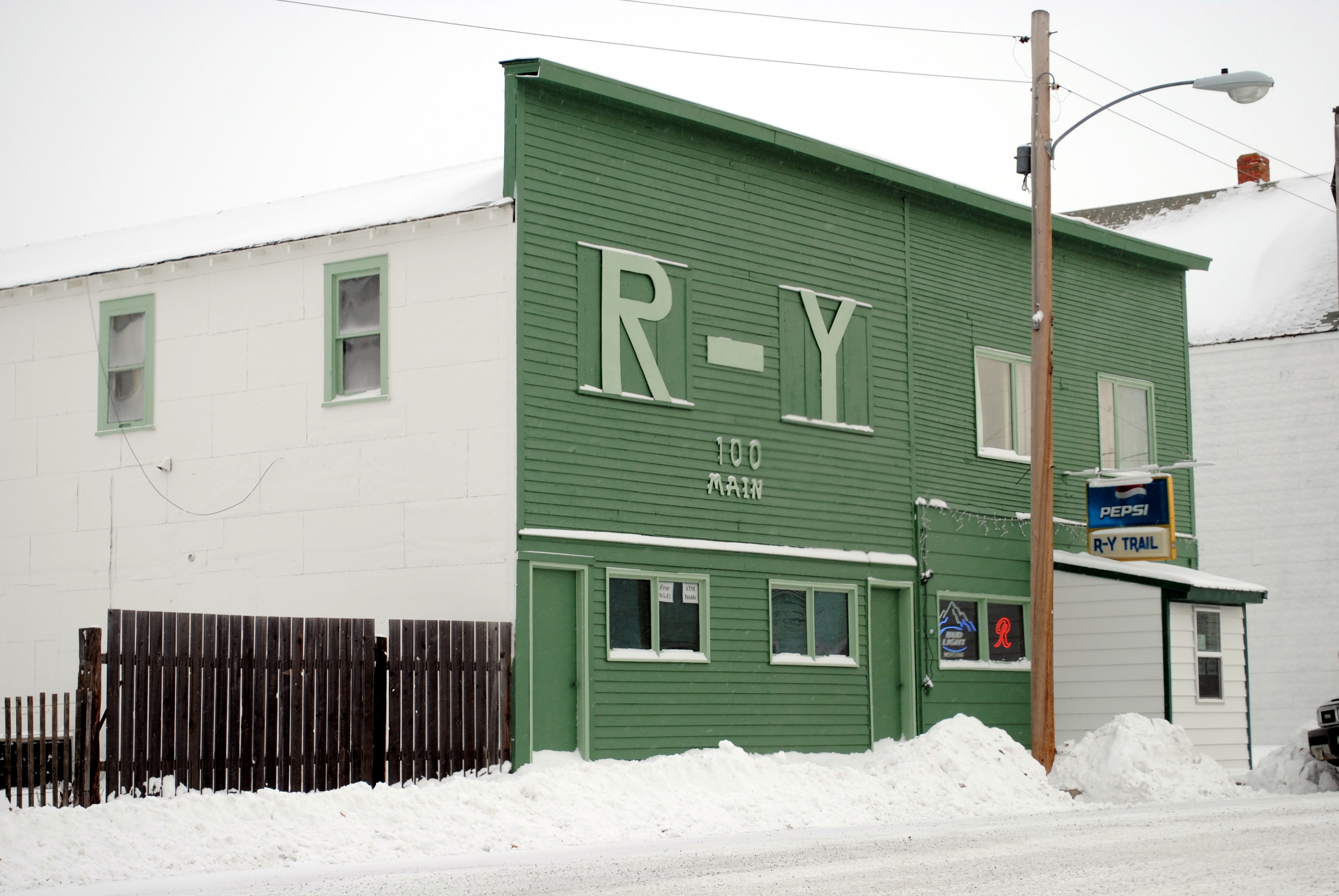
- RY Trail Bar in downtown Flaxville, 2010

- Location of Flaxville, Montana
- Coordinates: 48°48′16″N 105°10′25″W
- Country: United States
- State: Montana
- County: Daniels

Area
  - Total: 0.077 sq mi (0.20 km^{2})
  - Land: 0.077 sq mi (0.20 km^{2})
  - Water: 0 sq mi (0.00 km^{2})
- Elevation: 2,776 ft (846 m)

Population (2020)
  - Total: 63
  - Density: 804.1/sq mi (310.45/km^{2})
- Time zone: UTC-7 (Mountain (MST))
  - Summer (DST): UTC-6 (MDT)
- ZIP code: 59222
- Area code: 406
- FIPS code: 30-26800
- GNIS feature ID: 2412630

Flaxville is a town in Daniels County, Montana, United States. The population was 63 at the 2020 census.

== Geography ==
Flaxville is located just south of the Canada–US border, at the junction of Highway 251 and Montana Highway 5.

According to the United States Census Bureau, the town has a total area of 0.10 square miles (0.26 km^{2}), all land.

Whitetail Reservoir, a state fishing access site, is located "7 miles north of Flaxville on Highway 511." The town's R-Y Trail Bar is named after a historic route. Merv Blevins, who farms in Bengough, Saskatchewan and Flaxville, Montana, describes the K-Y Trail as follows:

“The road that runs from Regina down to Miles City follows Highway 34 [which becomes Highway 511 in Montana] ... (it was used) when they were doing cattle drives and things back in the day, but it’s also used by our Native Americans to come up to the turtle effigy that’s located just south east of Big Beaver, that’s a holy sight for them and they come there and they have a sweat lodge there every once in awhile and they use the port of Big Beaver.”

== History ==
"Flaxville was originally founded as Boyer, about 2.5 miles southwest of where the town is now." It was named after "the Henry Boyer family at whose home the early railroad construction workers were fed." The current town was founded in 1913 following the arrival of a Great Northern Railway branch line that eventually ran from Bainville to Opheim. "The first post office was established in 1914 with Martha Bledsoe as postmaster."

The name refers to the abundance of flax grown in the area. There are grain elevators beside the railroad tracks running through town.

The town was incorporated in 1955. It is home to the Daniels County Chapter of Pheasants Forever, The Barn Theater, Country Roads Mini Horses, and the R-Y Trail Bar.

Printmaker Don Bunse (1934 - 1994), who taught at University of Montana and developed collagraphy with a group of artists, was born in Flaxville. "He was a delegate for the University of Montana in the first academic art exchange between the United States and the People's Republic of China."

== Demographics ==
Historical population
| Census | Pop. | Note | %± |
|---|---|---|---|
| 1930 | 515 | | — |
| 1940 | 469 | | −8.9% |
| 1950 | 374 | | −20.3% |
| 1960 | 262 | | −29.9% |
| 1970 | 185 | | −29.4% |
| 1980 | 142 | | −23.2% |
| 1990 | 88 | | −38.0% |
| 2000 | 87 | | −1.1% |
| 2010 | 71 | | −18.4% |
| 2020 | 63 | | −11.3% |
U.S. Decennial Census

=== 2010 census ===
As of the census of 2010, there were 71 people, 37 households, and 17 families residing in the town. The population density was 710.0 inhabitants per square mile (274.1/km^{2}). There were 55 housing units at an average density of 550.0 per square mile (212.4/km^{2}). The racial makeup of the town was 93.0% White, 1.4% Native American, and 5.6% from two or more races. Hispanic or Latino of any race were 1.4% of the population.

There were 37 households, of which 13.5% had children under the age of 18 living with them, 43.2% were married couples living together, 2.7% had a female householder with no husband present, and 54.1% were non-families. 43.2% of all households were made up of individuals, and 13.5% had someone living alone who was 65 years of age or older. The average household size was 1.92 and the average family size was 2.76.

The median age in the town was 46.5 years. 15.5% of residents were under the age of 18; 6.9% were between the ages of 18 and 24; 22.5% were from 25 to 44; 36.7% were from 45 to 64; and 18.3% were 65 years of age or older. The gender makeup of the town was 47.9% male and 52.1% female.

=== 2000 census ===
As of the census of 2000, there were 87 people, 44 households, and 20 families residing in the town. The population density was 837.7 inhabitants per square mile (323.4/km^{2}). There were 59 housing units at an average density of 568.1 per square mile (219.3/km^{2}). The racial makeup of the town was 91.95% White, 2.30% Native American, 1.15% Asian, 2.30% from other races, and 2.30% from two or more races.

There were 44 households, out of which 13.6% had children under the age of 18 living with them, 40.9% were married couples living together, 4.5% had a female householder with no husband present, and 52.3% were non-families. 47.7% of all households were made up of individuals, and 27.3% had someone living alone who was 65 years of age or older. The average household size was 1.98 and the average family size was 2.95.

In the town, the population was spread out, with 21.8% under the age of 18, 2.3% from 18 to 24, 24.1% from 25 to 44, 19.5% from 45 to 64, and 32.2% who were 65 years of age or older. The median age was 48 years. For every 100 females there were 102.3 males. For every 100 females age 18 and over, there were 119.4 males.

The median income for a household in the town was $34,688, and the median income for a family was $39,375. Males had a median income of $35,625 versus $42,917 for females. The per capita income for the town was $18,567. There were 8.7% of families and 9.1% of the population living below the poverty line, including no under eighteens and 25.0% of those over 64.

== Education ==
Scobey Public Schools provides education for students in kindergarten through 12th grade.

== Media ==
The Daniels County Leader is the local newspaper. They publish both print and online news editions.

== See also ==
- Flaxville Gravels
