= KATQ-FM =

- Plentywood, Montana; United States
- Broadcast area: Northeast Montana, Western North Dakota, Southern Saskatchewan
- Frequency: 100.1 MHz
- Branding: The Q

Programming
- Format: Classic rock

Ownership
- Owner: Radio International KATQ Broadcast Association

History
- First air date: 1962 (as KPWD)
- Former call signs: KPWD (1962–1979)

Technical information
- Licensing authority: FCC
- Facility ID: 54640
- Class: A
- ERP: 3,000 watts
- HAAT: 21 meters (69 feet)
- Transmitter coordinates: 48°46′1.1″N 104°32′44.8″W

Links
- Public license information: Public file; LMS

KATQ-FM 100.1 FM, is a radio station licensed to serve Plentywood, Montana. The station is owned by the Radio International KATQ Broadcast Association, airing a classic rock format. The studios are at 112 Third Avenue East.

The station was assigned the KATQ-FM call letters by the Federal Communications Commission on June 18, 1979.

The station flipped from country music (simulcasting KATQ-AM) to classic rock in February 2013.
