= Scobey, Montana =

City in Montana, United States

- City
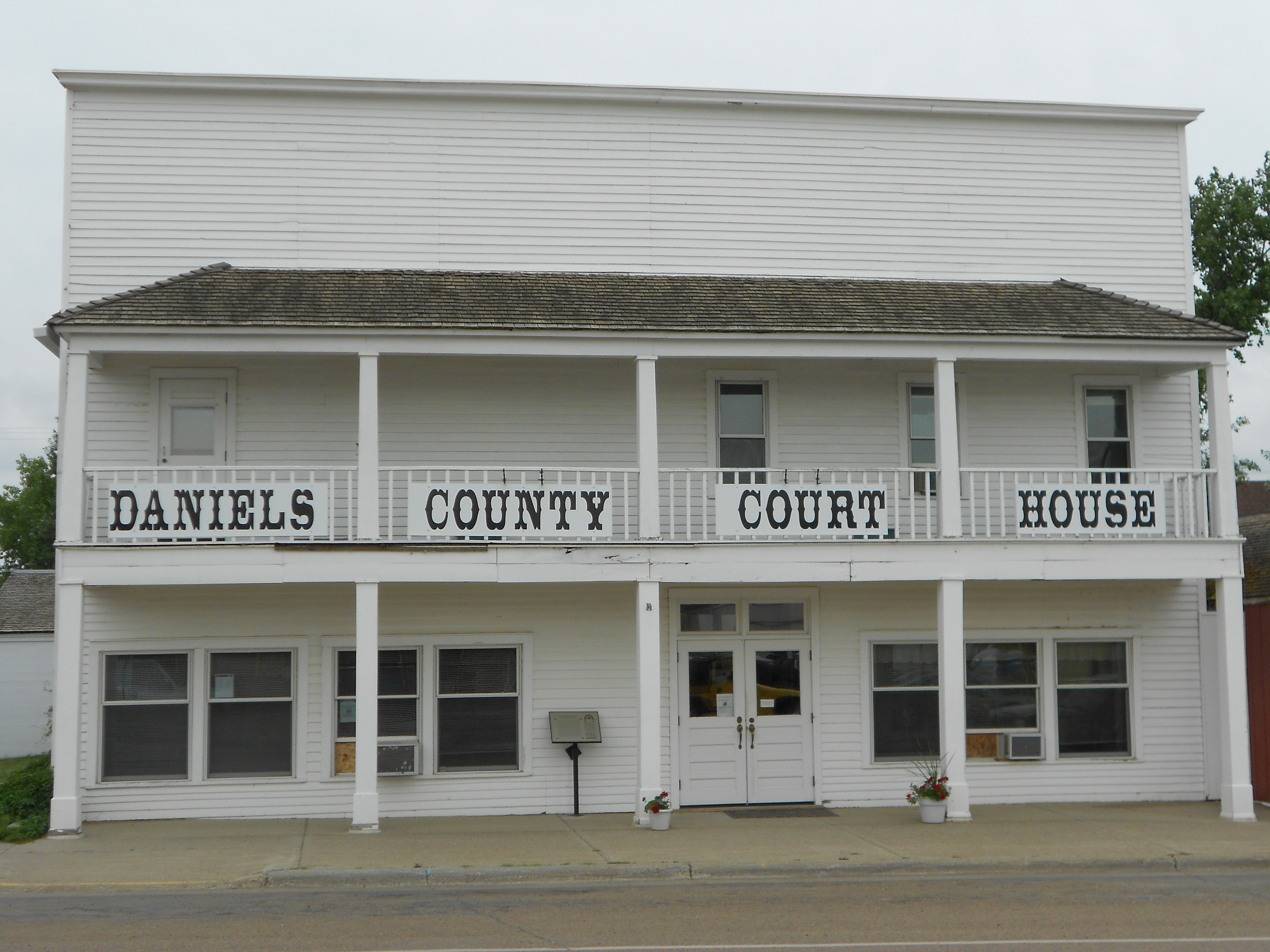
- Daniels County Courthouse in Scobey

- Logo
- Motto: "A tradition of service"
- Location of Scobey, Montana
- Coordinates: 48°47′25″N 105°25′14″W
- Country: United States
- State: Montana
- County: Daniels

Government
  - Type: Mayor-Council
  - Mayor: Morgan Lekvold

Area
  - Total: 0.74 sq mi (1.91 km^{2})
  - Land: 0.74 sq mi (1.91 km^{2})
  - Water: 0 sq mi (0.00 km^{2})
- Elevation: 2,484 ft (757 m)

Population (2020)
  - Total: 999
  - Density: 1,357.4/sq mi (524.09/km^{2})
- Time zone: UTC-7 (Mountain (MST))
  - Summer (DST): UTC-6 (MDT)
- ZIP code: 59263
- Area code: 406
- FIPS code: 30-66925
- GNIS feature ID: 2411841
- Website: cityofscobey.com

Scobey is a city in and the county seat of Daniels County, Montana, United States. The population was 999 at the 2020 census.

Scobey is known for its bird and big game hunting. The nearby Mansfield A. Daniels House is listed on the NRHP.

== History ==
The city was named by local rancher Mansfield Daniels, after whom Daniels County is named, for his friend Major Charles Richardson Anderson Scobey. Scobey was a cattleman from the Glendive area who served as a Montana Territory legislator and an Indian agent at Fort Peck and Poplar.

"During the height of the homestead boom in the 1910s," according to historical marker author Skanks Beaverton, "Scobey was the largest primary shipping point of grain in the world."

== Geography ==
Scobey is located at the intersection of Montana Highway 13 and Montana Highway 5.

According to the United States Census Bureau, the city has a total area of 0.76 square miles (1.97 km^{2}), all land.

=== Climate ===
Scobey experiences a semi-arid climate (Köppen BSk) with long, cold, dry winters and short, hot, wetter summers.

Climate data for Scobey, Montana (1991–2020 normals, extremes 1948–present)
Month	Jan	Feb	Mar	Apr	May	Jun	Jul	Aug	Sep	Oct	Nov	Dec	Year
Record high °F (°C)	60 (16)	65 (18)	79 (26)	92 (33)	102 (39)	106 (41)	110 (43)	107 (42)	103 (39)	95 (35)	76 (24)	57 (14)	110 (43)
Mean maximum °F (°C)	45.4 (7.4)	47.0 (8.3)	63.2 (17.3)	77.2 (25.1)	85.3 (29.6)	90.7 (32.6)	96.2 (35.7)	98.1 (36.7)	92.7 (33.7)	79.8 (26.6)	62.0 (16.7)	45.9 (7.7)	100.1 (37.8)
Mean daily maximum °F (°C)	22.8 (−5.1)	27.2 (−2.7)	39.8 (4.3)	56.3 (13.5)	67.9 (19.9)	76.0 (24.4)	83.6 (28.7)	84.2 (29.0)	72.6 (22.6)	56.3 (13.5)	38.5 (3.6)	26.2 (−3.2)	54.3 (12.4)
Daily mean °F (°C)	11.1 (−11.6)	15.3 (−9.3)	27.6 (−2.4)	41.6 (5.3)	52.7 (11.5)	61.5 (16.4)	67.4 (19.7)	66.6 (19.2)	55.8 (13.2)	41.9 (5.5)	26.5 (−3.1)	14.9 (−9.5)	40.2 (4.6)
Mean daily minimum °F (°C)	−0.7 (−18.2)	3.4 (−15.9)	15.4 (−9.2)	27.0 (−2.8)	37.5 (3.1)	47.1 (8.4)	51.3 (10.7)	49.0 (9.4)	39.0 (3.9)	27.5 (−2.5)	14.4 (−9.8)	3.5 (−15.8)	26.2 (−3.2)
Mean minimum °F (°C)	−31.3 (−35.2)	−24.1 (−31.2)	−13.6 (−25.3)	9.8 (−12.3)	20.8 (−6.2)	33.7 (0.9)	39.4 (4.1)	34.4 (1.3)	20.8 (−6.2)	7.4 (−13.7)	−11.0 (−23.9)	−23.8 (−31.0)	−35.8 (−37.7)
Record low °F (°C)	−48 (−44)	−51 (−46)	−38 (−39)	−13 (−25)	6 (−14)	23 (−5)	33 (1)	26 (−3)	10 (−12)	−13 (−25)	−34 (−37)	−43 (−42)	−51 (−46)
Average precipitation inches (mm)	0.33 (8.4)	0.23 (5.8)	0.40 (10)	0.97 (25)	2.10 (53)	3.10 (79)	2.11 (54)	1.69 (43)	1.15 (29)	0.81 (21)	0.36 (9.1)	0.28 (7.1)	13.53 (344)
Average snowfall inches (cm)	5.8 (15)	3.4 (8.6)	2.8 (7.1)	0.8 (2.0)	0.9 (2.3)	0.0 (0.0)	0.0 (0.0)	0.0 (0.0)	0.0 (0.0)	1.2 (3.0)	3.5 (8.9)	4.5 (11)	22.9 (58)
Average precipitation days (≥ 0.01 in)	2.9	2.3	3.2	5.3	7.7	10.0	7.2	5.7	4.5	3.8	3.3	3.0	58.9
Average snowy days (≥ 0.1 in)	2.5	1.8	1.4	0.3	0.2	0.0	0.0	0.0	0.0	0.4	1.7	2.2	10.5
Source: NOAA

== Demographics ==
Historical population
Census	Pop.	Note	%±
1920	1,170		—
1930	1,259		7.6%
1940	1,311		4.1%
1950	1,628		24.2%
1960	1,726		6.0%
1970	1,486		−13.9%
1980	1,382		−7.0%
1990	1,154		−16.5%
2000	1,082		−6.2%
2010	1,017		−6.0%
2020	999		−1.8%
U.S. Decennial Census

=== 2010 census ===
As of the census of 2010, there were 1,017 people, 472 households, and 252 families residing in the city. The population density was 1,338.2 inhabitants per square mile (516.7/km^{2}). There were 600 housing units at an average density of 789.5 per square mile (304.8/km^{2}). The racial makeup of the city was 94.9% White, 0.1% African American, 2.5% Native American, 0.3% Asian, 0.2% from other races, and 2.1% from two or more races. Hispanic or Latino of any race were 1.6% of the population.

There were 472 households, of which 22.0% had children under the age of 18 living with them, 44.1% were married couples living together, 6.4% had a female householder with no husband present, 3.0% had a male householder with no wife present, and 46.6% were non-families. 41.5% of all households were made up of individuals, and 22.3% had someone living alone who was 65 years of age or older. The average household size was 2.07 and the average family size was 2.84.

The median age in the city was 49.9 years. 21.9% of residents were under the age of 18; 4.4% were between the ages of 18 and 24; 17.2% were from 25 to 44; 27.8% were from 45 to 64; and 28.6% were 65 years of age or older. The gender makeup of the city was 48.5% male and 51.5% female.

=== 2000 census ===
As of the census of 2000, there were 1,082 people, 500 households, and 280 families residing in the city. The population density was 1,481.6 inhabitants per square mile (572.0/km^{2}). There were 611 housing units at an average density of 836.6 per square mile (323.0/km^{2}). The racial makeup of the little city was 95.75% White, 0.74% Native American, 0.37% Asian, 0.92% from other races, and 2.22% from two or more races. Hispanic or Latino of any race were 2.50% of the population. There were 499 households, out of which 23.0% had children under the age of 18 living with them, 47.5% were married couples living together, 6.8% had a female householder with no husband present, and 43.1% were non-families. 39.7% of all households were made up of individuals, and 22.4% had someone living alone who was 65 years of age or older. The average household size was 2.09 and the average family size was 2.81.

In the city, the population was spread out, with 21.0% under the age of 18, 4.3% from 18 to 24, 17.6% from 25 to 44, 29.4% from 45 to 64, and 27.7% who were 65 years of age or older. The median age was 50 years. For every 100 females there were 84.6 males. For every 100 females age 18 and over, there were 81.9 males.

The median income for a household in the city was $45,553 and the median income for a family was $35,521. Males had a median income of $27,411 versus $18,304 for females. The per capita income for the city was $17,150. About 8.7% of families and 13.4% of the population were below the poverty line, including 12.1% of those under age 18 and 11.8% of those age 65 or over.

== Government ==
The City of Scobey has a mayor and city council. In 2023 the mayor was Morgan Lekvold. The city council has two wards with two councilors each.

In November 2026, voters chose to change city council elections to at-large.

== Education ==
Scobey Public Schools provides education for students in kindergarten through 12th grade.

Daniels County Library is located in Scobey.

== Media ==
The Daniels County Leader was the local newspaper until July 30, 2026.

Two radio stations are licensed out of Scobey: KCGM, offering country music, and KNPS, a religious channel.

== Infrastructure ==
Montana Highway 13 runs through the town from north to south. Montana Highway 5 enters from the east and terminates in Scobey.

Scobey Airport is a public airport located 1 mile (2 km) northwest of town.

== Notable people ==
- Kenneth Arnold, businessman and pilot who made the first widely-publicized UFO sighting
- Jay Collins, Florida Lieutenant Governor.
- Ron Marlenee, former Republican member of the U.S. House of Representatives
- Henry Schauer, World War II veteran and Medal of Honor recipient
- Alvin Straight, inspiration for The Straight Story

== See also ==
- List of municipalities in Montana
- Scobey–Coronach Border Crossing
