= Plentywood, Montana =

City in Montana, United States

Plentywood
- City
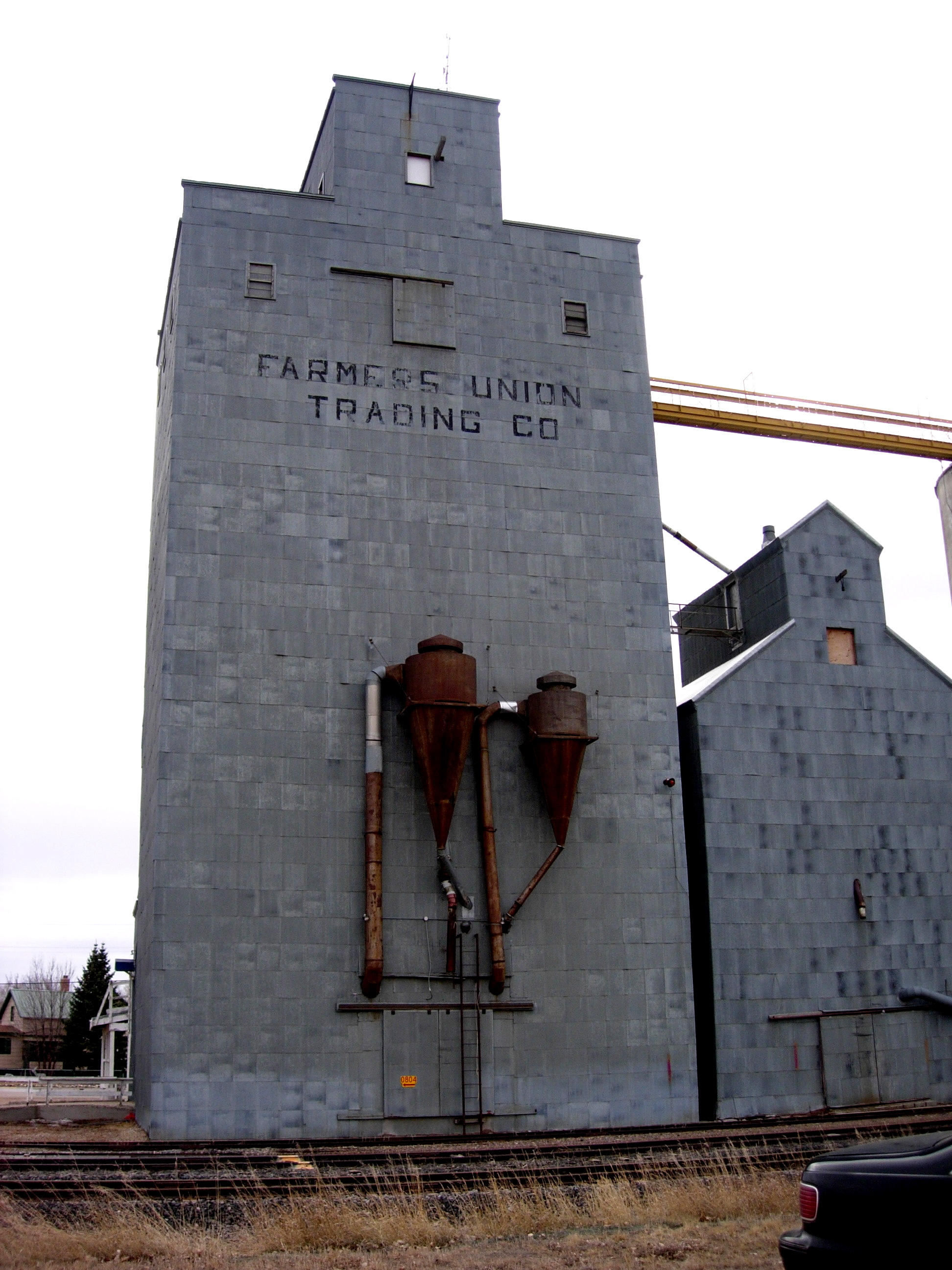
- Grain Elevator in Plentywood

- Location of Plentywood, Montana

- Location in the United States
- Coordinates: 48°46′34″N 104°33′32″W
- Country: United States
- State: Montana
- County: Sheridan

Area
  - Total: 1.36 sq mi (3.51 km^{2})
  - Land: 1.36 sq mi (3.51 km^{2})
  - Water: 0 sq mi (0.00 km^{2})
- Elevation: 2,047 ft (624 m)

Population (2020)
  - Total: 1,669
  - Density: 1,230.0/sq mi (474.91/km^{2})
- Time zone: UTC-7 (Mountain (MST))
  - Summer (DST): UTC-6 (MDT)
- ZIP code: 59254
- Area code: 406
- FIPS code: 30-58375
- GNIS feature ID: 2411443

Plentywood is a city in and the county seat of Sheridan County, Montana, United States. The population was 1,669 at the 2020 census.

== History ==
In 1881, Sitting Bull and his band surrendered to US forces roughly at what is now Plentywood.

Butch Cassidy and other rustlers used a trail through Plentywood to move their stolen cattle into Canada. The plentiful gulches provided coverage for the outlaws. The Enlarged Homestead Act of 1909 sparked an increase in Montana homesteaders, including in the Plentywood area. Claiming this land forced some of the outlaws away.

The first business in Plentywood opened in 1900, and a post office was established two years later. The city incorporated in 1912, following the arrival of a Great Northern Railway branch line that eventually ran from Bainville to Opheim.

Local folklore suggests that the name of the nearby Plentywood Creek, after which the city was named, comes from a search for firewood. One day, according to the story, a group of cowboys watched in exasperation as the chuck wagon cook attempted to start a fire with damp buffalo chips. Finally, in frustration, Dutch Henry said, "If you'll go two miles up this creek, you'll find plenty wood."

During the 1920s, Plentywood became nationally renowned due to the rise of communists to elected positions in both Plentywood and Sheridan County. As one historian put it, "three decades before Senator Joseph McCarthy tried to inspire hysteria in the hearts of Americans with the specter of creeping Communist control, radicals in Sheridan County had already accomplished what McCarthyites perhaps feared most: they had created a community where 'Reds' occupied every elected office in the county." Though the moment had mostly collapsed by late 1932, it has received renewed interest since the publication of a book on the topic in 2010.

== Geography ==
According to the United States Census Bureau, the city has a total area of 1.17 square miles (3.03 km^{2}), all land.

The area has small rolling hills with a significant amount of land given to agriculture. Boxelder Lake is north of town. Brush Lake State Park is 31 miles (50 km) south.

=== Climate ===
According to the Köppen Climate Classification system, Plentywood has a semi-arid climate, abbreviated "BSk" on climate maps.

Climate data for Plentywood, Montana, 1991–2020 normals, extremes 1906–present
Month	Jan	Feb	Mar	Apr	May	Jun	Jul	Aug	Sep	Oct	Nov	Dec	Year
Record high °F (°C)	59 (15)	68 (20)	77 (25)	89 (32)	97 (36)	105 (41)	109 (43)	108 (42)	105 (41)	96 (36)	75 (24)	55 (13)	109 (43)
Mean maximum °F (°C)	44.9 (7.2)	47.4 (8.6)	65.7 (18.7)	77.8 (25.4)	87.1 (30.6)	91.8 (33.2)	96.6 (35.9)	97.3 (36.3)	92.2 (33.4)	78.1 (25.6)	61.3 (16.3)	45.2 (7.3)	99.2 (37.3)
Mean daily maximum °F (°C)	20.6 (−6.3)	25.8 (−3.4)	38.9 (3.8)	54.3 (12.4)	66.5 (19.2)	74.8 (23.8)	82.0 (27.8)	82.3 (27.9)	71.5 (21.9)	54.7 (12.6)	36.9 (2.7)	23.7 (−4.6)	52.7 (11.5)
Daily mean °F (°C)	9.4 (−12.6)	14.3 (−9.8)	26.8 (−2.9)	40.4 (4.7)	52.0 (11.1)	61.3 (16.3)	67.2 (19.6)	66.4 (19.1)	55.7 (13.2)	41.0 (5.0)	25.6 (−3.6)	13.2 (−10.4)	39.4 (4.1)
Mean daily minimum °F (°C)	−1.8 (−18.8)	2.7 (−16.3)	14.7 (−9.6)	26.5 (−3.1)	37.5 (3.1)	47.8 (8.8)	52.4 (11.3)	50.6 (10.3)	39.9 (4.4)	27.3 (−2.6)	14.4 (−9.8)	2.7 (−16.3)	26.2 (−3.2)
Mean minimum °F (°C)	−28.0 (−33.3)	−21.5 (−29.7)	−9.2 (−22.9)	11.2 (−11.6)	23.1 (−4.9)	36.3 (2.4)	42.7 (5.9)	38.1 (3.4)	23.9 (−4.5)	10.6 (−11.9)	−7.0 (−21.7)	−21.9 (−29.9)	−32.2 (−35.7)
Record low °F (°C)	−44 (−42)	−48 (−44)	−33 (−36)	−14 (−26)	9 (−13)	28 (−2)	34 (1)	30 (−1)	16 (−9)	−11 (−24)	−28 (−33)	−36 (−38)	−48 (−44)
Average precipitation inches (mm)	0.39 (9.9)	0.35 (8.9)	0.60 (15)	1.02 (26)	2.04 (52)	3.07 (78)	2.54 (65)	1.46 (37)	1.26 (32)	0.88 (22)	0.61 (15)	0.47 (12)	14.69 (372.8)
Average precipitation days (≥ 0.01 in)	4.4	3.6	4.0	5.3	8.0	11.0	8.6	6.0	5.8	4.9	4.5	4.2	70.3
Source 1: NOAA
Source 2: National Weather Service

== Demographics ==
Historical population
Census	Pop.	Note	%±
1920	888		—
1930	1,226		38.1%
1940	1,574		28.4%
1950	1,862		18.3%
1960	2,121		13.9%
1970	2,381		12.3%
1980	2,476		4.0%
1990	2,136		−13.7%
2000	2,061		−3.5%
2010	1,734		−15.9%
2020	1,669		−3.7%
U.S. Decennial Census

=== 2020 census ===
As of the 2020 census, Plentywood had a population of 1,669. The median age was 47.8 years. 18.9% of residents were under the age of 18 and 26.5% of residents were 65 years of age or older. For every 100 females there were 100.6 males, and for every 100 females age 18 and over there were 95.4 males age 18 and over.

0.0% of residents lived in urban areas, while 100.0% lived in rural areas.

There were 804 households in Plentywood, of which 20.8% had children under the age of 18 living in them. Of all households, 40.3% were married-couple households, 24.3% were households with a male householder and no spouse or partner present, and 30.6% were households with a female householder and no spouse or partner present. About 43.5% of all households were made up of individuals and 21.1% had someone living alone who was 65 years of age or older.

There were 1,000 housing units, of which 19.6% were vacant. The homeowner vacancy rate was 4.5% and the rental vacancy rate was 19.2%.

Racial composition as of the 2020 census
Race	Number	Percent
White	1,527	91.5%
Black or African American	5	0.3%
American Indian and Alaska Native	21	1.3%
Asian	10	0.6%
Native Hawaiian and Other Pacific Islander	0	0.0%
Some other race	16	1.0%
Two or more races	90	5.4%
Hispanic or Latino (of any race)	55	3.3%

=== 2010 census ===
At the 2010 census, there were 1,734 people, 820 households and 462 families in the city. The population density was 1,482.1 per square mile (572.2/km^{2}). There were 972 housing units at an average density of 830.8 per square mile (320.8/km^{2}). The racial make-up was 95.0% White, 0.2% African American, 1.7% Native American, 0.7% Asian, 0.3% from other races and 2.1% from two or more races. Hispanic or Latino of any race were 2.1% of the population.

There were 820 households, of which 22.2% had children under the age of 18 living with them, 45.2% were married couples living together, 7.1% had a female householder with no husband present, 4.0% had a male householder with no wife present and 43.7% were non-families. 40.6% of all households were made up of individuals, and 18.6% had someone living alone who was 65 years of age or older. The average household size was 2.02 and the average family size was 2.68.

The median age was 49.7 years. 19.1% of residents were under the age of 18, 5.3% were between the ages of 18 and 24, 18.7% were from 25 to 44, 32.4% were from 45 to 64 and 24.5% were 65 years of age or older. The gender make-up was 47.8% male and 52.2% female.

=== 2000 census ===
At the 2000 census, there were 2,061 people, 857 households and 522 families in the city. The population density was 1,756.1 per square mile (678.0/km^{2}). There were 1,020 housing units at an average density of 869.1 per square mile (335.6/km^{2}). The racial make-up was 97.14% White, 0.97% Native American, 0.15% African American, 0.19% from other races and 1.12% from two or more races. Hispanic or Latino of any race were 1.12% of the population.

There were 857 households, of which 27.7% had children under the age of 18 living with them, 53.2% were married couples living together, 5.7% had a female householder with no husband present, and 39.0% were non-families. 36.3% of all households were made up of individuals, and 19.4% had someone living alone who was 65 years of age or older. The average household size was 2.26 and the average family size was 2.95.

23.3% of the population were under the age of 18, 4.5% from 18 to 24, 23.0% from 25 to 44, 23.7% from 45 to 64 and 25.5% were 65 years of age or older. The median age was 44 years. For every 100 females there were 88.7 males. For every 100 females age 18 and over, there were 85.8 males.

The median household income was $30,037 and the median family income was $37,679. Males had a median income of $24,741 and females $20,662. The per capita income was $15,609. About 10.6% of families and 16.3% of the population were below the poverty line, including 14.0% of those under age 18 and 19.1% of those age 65 or over.

== Economy ==
Plentywood has been a center for purchase of pulse crops since 2005.

C&B Operations is an agriculture equipment dealership in Plentywood. The company offers a two year apprenticeship to create skilled technicians.

Sheridan Memorial Hospital and the school district are major employers.

== Government ==
Plentywood has a mayor and city council. In November 2025 Randy Rice ran unopposed for mayor.

== Education ==
The school district is Plentywood K-12 Schools. Plentywood Schools educates students from kindergarten to 12th grade. There are three schools: an elementary for kindergarten to 6th grade, a middle school for grades 7 and 8, and a high school for 9th to 12th grade. In the 2021-2022 school year, the district had a total of 359 students.

=== Plentywood High School ===
The school's team name is the Wildcats.

In 1969, Plentywood played Choteau and lost in its first Class B boys' state championship basketball appearance. The 1976 boys' basketball team won the Montana Class A title against Hamilton as one of the smallest Class A teams in the state at the time. In 1978, the boys' basketball team won the Class B title against Big Timber after declining enrollment resulted in a downward classification. The 1979 boys' basketball team finished as runners-up to the archrival Scobey Spartans at the State B Boys' Basketball Tournament. The 2007 boys' basketball team finished again as runners up, this time to Huntly Project at the State B Boys' Tournament. In 1998, the Wildcats finished third at the State Tourney and in the 1980s had two top four finishes at the State Tournament as well.

The 1971 Plentywood Wildcats American football team, coached by Doug Dierenfield, reached the class B state championship, losing in overtime 6–8 to Huntley Project.

The 1981 Plentywood Wildcats American football team, coached by Ron Smith, beat the Big Timber Herders 20-14 for the State B title in Big Timber. Smith is the only coach in Sheridan County to have ever won a State Football title.

In 1997, the Plentywood Wildcat American football team also reached the state championship, losing to Frenchtown 27-20 after being up 20–7 at half time.

The 1999 and 2000 girls' golf team won the State B-C title.

For 5 years, from 1997 to 2001, Plentywood was the state champion girls' 4x400 relay winner

In 1977, Plentywood won the Class B State Championship in boys' cross country. Cross country was later dropped from the athletic program.

The Plentywood boys' track team has won four state titles, in 1970, 1971, 1972 and 1973.

=== Library ===
Sheridan County Library is a public library which serves the area.

== Media ==
Plentywood is the location of Radio International, with the combined signals of KATQ 1070, KATQ-FM 100.1, and KATQ-FM 107.1. All stations are located at 112 Third Avenue East. The stations serve the northeast Montana, western North Dakota and southern Saskatchewan region.

The Sheridan County News is a print only newspaper covering local news.

== Infrastructure ==
Montana Highway 5 and Montana Highway 16 overlap as they pass through town from southeast to northwest. Highway 5 runs east to west, while highway 16 runs north to south. The border into Canada is 16 miles (26 km) north. Travelers use the Raymond–Regway Border Crossing to enter Canada.

Sher-Wood Airport is a public use airport located one mile (2 km) northeast of the town. The nearest commercial airport is in Williston, North Dakota, 81 miles (130 km) southeast.

Sherwood Memorial Hospital provides medical care.

== Notable people ==
- Robin Selvig: University of Montana Grizzly women's basketball coach for 38 seasons is a native of nearby Outlook; his first teaching job was at Plentywood High School.
