= KATQ (AM) =

Radio station in Plentywood, Montana

- Plentywood, Montana; United States
- Frequency: 1070 kHz
- Branding: KATQ, The Q

Programming
- Format: Classic Country

Ownership
- Owner: Radio International KATQ Broadcast Association
- Sister stations: KATQ-FM

History
- First air date: 1979
- Former call signs: KHPN

Technical information
- Licensing authority: FCC
- Facility ID: 54639
- Class: D
- Power: 5,000 watts (day); 50 watts (night)
- Transmitter coordinates: 48°46′01″N 104°32′43″W
- Translators: K296HF (107.1 MHz, Plentywood)

Links
- Public license information: Public file; LMS
- Website: www.katqradio.com

KATQ (1070 AM, 107.1FM, 100.1 FM) is a radio station licensed to serve Plentywood, Montana. The station is owned by Radio International KATQ Broadcast Association and broadcasts two formats, a classic country music format on 1070 Khz AM and translator 107.1 MHz FM and a classic rock format on 100.1 MHz FM. The studios are at 112 Third Avenue East.

The 5000 watt AM daytimer signed-on September 14, 1979 with call letters of KATQ honoring the Plentywood Wildcats, mascot of the local high school. A subsequent owner briefly changed the call letters in the 1980s, but they were returned to KATQ by the Federal Communications Commission on August 1, 1987.
