= Sher-Wood Airport =

Airport in Montana, United States

- IATA: PWD; ICAO: KPWD; FAA LID: PWD

Summary
- Airport type: Public
- Owner: City of Plentwood & Sheridan County
- Serves: Plentywood, Montana
- Elevation AMSL: 2,264 ft (690 m)
- Coordinates: 48°47′20″N 104°31′23″W
- Interactive map of Sher-Wood Airport

Runways
Direction	Length		Surface
Direction	ft	m	Surface
12/30	3,900	1,189	Asphalt
8/26	2,951	899	Turf
16/34	1,601	488	Turf

Statistics (2008)
- Aircraft operations: 11,360
- Based aircraft: 10
- Source: Federal Aviation Administration

Sher-Wood Airport (IATA: PWD, ICAO: KPWD, FAA LID: PWD) is a public use airport located one nautical mile (2 km) northeast of the central business district of Plentywood, a city in Sheridan County, Montana, United States. It is owned by the city and county. This airport is included in the National Plan of Integrated Airport Systems for 2011–2015, which categorized it as a general aviation facility.

== Facilities and aircraft ==
Sher-Wood Airport covers an area of 600 acres (243 ha) at an elevation of 2,264 feet (690 m) above mean sea level. It has three runways: 12/30 is 3,900 by 75 feet (1,189 x 23 m) with an asphalt surface; 8/26 is 2,951 by 60 feet (899 x 18 m) with a turf surface; 16/34 is 1,601 by 83 feet (488 x 25 m) with a turf surface.

For the 12-month period ending September 9, 2008, the airport had 11,360 aircraft operations, an average of 31 per day: 98% general aviation and 2% air taxi. At that time there were 10 aircraft based at this airport: 80% single-engine and 20% ultralight.

== See also ==
- List of airports in Montana
