= Daniels County, Montana =

County in Montana, United States

- County
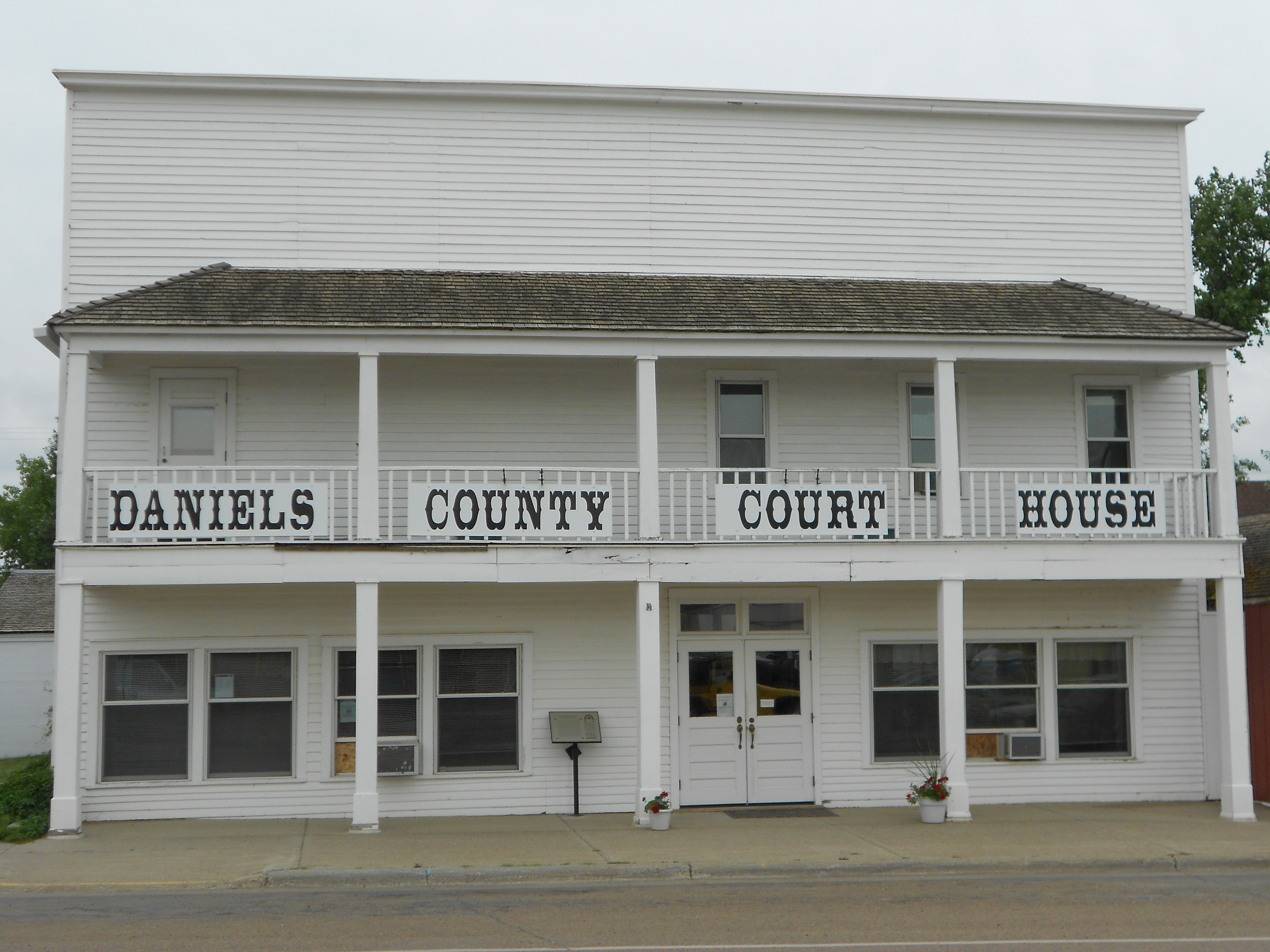
- Daniels County Courthouse in Scobey

- Location within the U.S. state of Montana
- Coordinates: 48°47′N 105°33′W
- Country: United States
- State: Montana
- Founded: 1920
- Named for: Mansfield Daniels
- Seat: Scobey
- Largest city: Scobey

Area
  - Total: 1,426 sq mi (3,690 km^{2})
  - Land: 1,426 sq mi (3,690 km^{2})
  - Water: 0.4 sq mi (1.0 km^{2}) 0.03%

Population (2020)
  - Total: 1,661
  - Estimate (2025): 1,612 ▼
  - Density: 1.165/sq mi (0.4497/km^{2})
- Time zone: UTC−7 (Mountain)
  - Summer (DST): UTC−6 (MDT)
- Congressional district: 2nd
- Website: https://www.danielscountymt.gov/
- Montana county number 37

Daniels County is a county located in the U.S. state of Montana. As of the 2020 census, the population was 1,661. Its county seat is Scobey. It is on Montana's north border, and thus abuts the Canada–US border with Saskatchewan.

== History ==
Daniels County was created in 1920 from portions of Sheridan and Valley Counties. The name comes from Mansfield Daniels, a local rancher.

== Geography ==
According to the United States Census Bureau, the county has a total area of 1,426 square miles (3,690 km^{2}), of which 1,426 square miles (3,690 km^{2}) is land and 0.4 square miles (1.0 km^{2}) (0.03%) is water.

Daniels County is predominantly rolling plains. The Poplar River flows through the county.

=== Major highways ===
- Montana Highway 5
- Montana Highway 13

=== Adjacent counties and rural municipalities ===
- Rural Municipality (RM) of Old Post No. 43, Saskatchewan (SK) - northwest
- RM of Poplar Valley No. 12, SK - north
- RM of Hart Butte No. 11, SK - north
- RM of Happy Valley No. 10, SK - northeast
- Sheridan County - east
- Roosevelt County - south
- Valley County - west

== Politics ==
United States presidential election results for Daniels County, Montana
Year	Republican		Democratic		Third party(ies)	
Year	No.	%	No.	%	No.	%
1920	811	60.12%	289	21.42%	249	18.46%
1924	505	35.19%	185	12.89%	745	51.92%
1928	936	53.92%	780	44.93%	20	1.15%
1932	482	25.56%	1,172	62.14%	232	12.30%
1936	467	22.08%	1,596	75.46%	52	2.46%
1940	807	42.01%	1,086	56.53%	28	1.46%
1944	680	44.85%	824	54.35%	12	0.79%
1948	624	40.97%	826	54.24%	73	4.79%
1952	1,092	62.47%	649	37.13%	7	0.40%
1956	982	50.93%	946	49.07%	0	0.00%
1960	763	44.26%	960	55.68%	1	0.06%
1964	742	42.89%	987	57.05%	1	0.06%
1968	826	52.15%	688	43.43%	70	4.42%
1972	973	61.82%	570	36.21%	31	1.97%
1976	816	49.79%	797	48.63%	26	1.59%
1980	1,086	65.19%	483	28.99%	97	5.82%
1984	984	66.62%	473	32.02%	20	1.35%
1988	802	57.49%	571	40.93%	22	1.58%
1992	496	36.39%	457	33.53%	410	30.08%
1996	558	42.53%	510	38.87%	244	18.60%
2000	750	67.57%	303	27.30%	57	5.14%
2004	764	68.28%	326	29.13%	29	2.59%
2008	694	64.68%	343	31.97%	36	3.36%
2012	740	73.49%	237	23.54%	30	2.98%
2016	730	75.88%	168	17.46%	64	6.65%
2020	799	78.80%	195	19.23%	20	1.97%
2024	778	81.81%	154	16.19%	19	2.00%

== Demographics ==
Historical population
Census	Pop.	Note	%±
1930	5,553		—
1940	4,563		−17.8%
1950	3,946		−13.5%
1960	3,755		−4.8%
1970	3,083		−17.9%
1980	2,835		−8.0%
1990	2,266		−20.1%
2000	2,017		−11.0%
2010	1,751		−13.2%
2020	1,661		−5.1%
2025 (est.)	1,612	▼	−3.0%
U.S. Decennial Census; 1790–1960, 1900–1990, 1990–2000, 2010–2020

=== 2020 census ===
As of the 2020 census, the county had a population of 1,661. Of the residents, 21.1% were under the age of 18 and 25.3% were 65 years of age or older; the median age was 45.8 years. For every 100 females there were 106.3 males, and for every 100 females age 18 and over there were 102.9 males. 0.0% of residents lived in urban areas and 100.0% lived in rural areas.

The racial makeup of the county was 88.7% White, 0.0% Black or African American, 2.4% American Indian and Alaska Native, 0.8% Asian, 0.1% from some other race, and 7.8% from two or more races. Hispanic or Latino residents of any race comprised 3.0% of the population.

There were 738 households in the county, of which 26.2% had children under the age of 18 living with them and 23.0% had a female householder with no spouse or partner present. About 32.9% of all households were made up of individuals and 17.8% had someone living alone who was 65 years of age or older.

There were 1,043 housing units, of which 29.2% were vacant. Among occupied housing units, 78.9% were owner-occupied and 21.1% were renter-occupied. The homeowner vacancy rate was 3.3% and the rental vacancy rate was 8.2%.

=== 2010 census ===
As of the 2010 census, there were 1,751 people, 798 households, and 481 families living in the county. The population density was 1.2 inhabitants per square mile (0.46/km^{2}). There were 1,111 housing units at an average density of 0.8 units per square mile (0.31 units/km^{2}). The racial makeup of the county was 95.7% white, 2.1% American Indian, 0.2% black or African American, 0.2% Asian, 0.1% from other races, and 1.7% from two or more races. Those of Hispanic or Latino origin made up 1.5% of the population. In terms of ancestry, 39.4% were Norwegian, 31.8% were German, 9.0% were English, 8.3% were Irish, and 1.2% were American.

Of the 798 households, 21.8% had children under the age of 18 living with them, 52.1% were married couples living together, 4.6% had a female householder with no husband present, 39.7% were non-families, and 35.1% of all households were made up of individuals. The average household size was 2.14 and the average family size was 2.77. The median age was 50.4 years.

The median income for a household in the county was $38,125 and the median income for a family was $49,479. Males had a median income of $36,250 versus $25,921 for females. The per capita income for the county was $24,737. About 9.8% of families and 14.1% of the population were below the poverty line, including 20.6% of those under age 18 and 9.0% of those age 65 or over.

== Government ==
Daniels County has three districts each with a single county commissioner. In the November 2026 election the voters chose to retain the current elected officials form of governement.

In November 2026 voters decided on whether county officials should be elected on a partisan or non-partisan basis. 51% of voters chose to conduct elections on a partisan basis.

== Economy ==
The main source of income for Daniels County has been cattle and dryland wheat.

== Education ==
There is one K-12 school serving all of Daniels County, Scobey High School.

== Communities ==
=== City ===
- Scobey (county seat)

=== Town ===
- Flaxville

=== Census-designated places ===
- Peerless
- Whitetail

=== Unincorporated communities ===
- Carbert
- Four Buttes
- Navajo
- Pleasant Prairie
- West Fork

== See also ==
- List of lakes in Daniels County, Montana
- List of mountains in Daniels County, Montana
- National Register of Historic Places listings in Daniels County MT
