= Outlook, Montana =

- Town
- Location of Outlook, Montana
- Coordinates: 48°53′20″N 104°47′06″W
- Country: United States
- State: Montana
- County: Sheridan

Area
  - Total: 1.25 sq mi (3.23 km^{2})
  - Land: 1.25 sq mi (3.23 km^{2})
  - Water: 0 sq mi (0.00 km^{2})
- Elevation: 2,339 ft (713 m)

Population (2020)
  - Total: 84
  - Density: 67.3/sq mi (25.99/km^{2})
- Time zone: UTC-7 (Mountain (MST))
  - Summer (DST): UTC-6 (MDT)
- ZIP code: 59252
- Area code: 406
- FIPS code: 30-56050
- GNIS feature ID: 2413095

Outlook is a town in Sheridan County, Montana, United States. The population was 84 at the 2020 census.

== History ==
Outlook began with the construction of the Minneapolis, St. Paul and Sault Ste. Marie Railroad in 1909. It was incorporated in 1913. A wildfire hit the town in 1999, destroying several buildings.

== Geography ==
According to the United States Census Bureau, the town has a total area of 1.30 square miles (3.37 km^{2}), all land.

== Demographics ==
Historical population
| Census | Pop. | Note | %± |
|---|---|---|---|
| 1920 | 295 | | — |
| 1930 | 302 | | 2.4% |
| 1940 | 208 | | −31.1% |
| 1950 | 235 | | 13.0% |
| 1960 | 226 | | −3.8% |
| 1970 | 153 | | −32.3% |
| 1980 | 122 | | −20.3% |
| 1990 | 109 | | −10.7% |
| 2000 | 82 | | −24.8% |
| 2010 | 47 | | −42.7% |
| 2020 | 84 | | 78.7% |
U.S. Decennial Census

=== 2010 census ===
As of the census of 2010, there were 47 people, 26 households, and 12 families residing in the town. The population density was 36.2 inhabitants per square mile (14.0/km^{2}). There were 42 housing units at an average density of 32.3 per square mile (12.5/km^{2}). The racial makeup of the town was 95.7% White and 4.3% Native American.

There were 26 households, of which 15.4% had children under the age of 18 living with them, 38.5% were married couples living together, 7.7% had a male householder with no wife present, and 53.8% were non-families. 53.8% of all households were made up of individuals, and 30.8% had someone living alone who was 65 years of age or older. The average household size was 1.81 and the average family size was 2.50.

The median age in the town was 50.5 years. 12.8% of residents were under the age of 18; 8.6% were between the ages of 18 and 24; 12.8% were from 25 to 44; 34.1% were from 45 to 64; and 31.9% were 65 years of age or older. The gender makeup of the town was 57.4% male and 42.6% female.

=== 2000 census ===
As of the census of 2000, there were 82 people, 35 households, and 22 families residing in the town. The population density was 62.8 inhabitants per square mile (24.2/km^{2}). There were 43 housing units at an average density of 33.0 per square mile (12.7/km^{2}). The racial makeup of the town was 95.12% White, 3.66% Native American, and 1.22% from two or more races. Hispanic or Latino of any race were 2.44% of the population.

There were 35 households, out of which 28.6% had children under the age of 18 living with them, 60.0% were married couples living together, 2.9% had a female householder with no husband present, and 37.1% were non-families. 34.3% of all households were made up of individuals, and 20.0% had someone living alone who was 65 years of age or older. The average household size was 2.34 and the average family size was 2.91.

In the town, the population was spread out, with 28.0% under the age of 18, 2.4% from 18 to 24, 23.2% from 25 to 44, 23.2% from 45 to 64, and 23.2% who were 65 years of age or older. The median age was 41 years. For every 100 females there were 78.3 males. For every 100 females age 18 and over, there were 103.4 males.

The median income for a household in the town was $35,000, and the median income for a family was $34,583. Males had a median income of $24,167 versus $18,333 for females. The per capita income for the town was $13,066. None of the population and none of the families were below the poverty line.

== Education ==
The school district is Plentywood K-12 Schools.
