= Swan Lake, Montana =

- Census-designated place
- Location within Montana Location within the United States
- Coordinates: 47°56′45″N 113°46′18″W
- Country: United States
- State: Montana
- County: Lake

Area
  - Total: 7.61 sq mi (19.71 km^{2})
  - Land: 7.61 sq mi (19.71 km^{2})
  - Water: 0 sq mi (0.00 km^{2})
- Elevation: 3,104 ft (946 m)

Population (2020)
  - Total: 102
  - Density: 13.4/sq mi (5.17/km^{2})
- Time zone: UTC-7 (Mountain (MST))
  - Summer (DST): UTC-6 (MDT)
- Area code: 406
- GNIS feature ID: 2583855
- FIPS code: 30-72850

Swan Lake is a census-designated place and unincorporated community in Lake County, Montana, United States. As of the 2020 census, Swan Lake had a population of 102.

== Geography ==
The Swan Lake CDP is in northeastern Lake County, on the east shore of the south end of the lake of the same name. The CDP extends east to the Lake County/Flathead County line, which runs along the crest of the Swan Range. The northern edge of the CDP follows Groom Creek, while the southern edge follows Bond Creek. Elevations range from 3,066 feet (935 m) on Swan Lake to 7,218 feet (2,200 m) at the summit of Con Kelly Mountain in the Swan Range. Montana Highway 83 runs through the community close to the shore of Swan Lake; it leads northwest 20 miles (32 km) to Montana Highway 35 north of Bigfork and south 71 miles (114 km) to Montana Highway 200 at Clearwater. Kalispell is 35 miles (56 km) northwest of Swan Lake via Highways 83, 82, and 93.

According to the U.S. Census Bureau, the Swan Lake CDP has an area of 7.6 square miles (19.7 km^{2}), all land.

== Climate ==
According to the Köppen Climate Classification system, Swan Lake has a warm-summer humid continental climate, abbreviated "Dfb" on climate maps. The hottest temperature recorded in Swan Lake was 106 °F (41.1 °C) on August 11, 2018, while the coldest temperature recorded was −40 °F (−40.0 °C) on December 30, 1968.

Climate data for Swan Lake, Montana, 1991–2020 normals, extremes 1963–present
Month	Jan	Feb	Mar	Apr	May	Jun	Jul	Aug	Sep	Oct	Nov	Dec	Year
Record high °F (°C)	58 (14)	61 (16)	76 (24)	86 (30)	93 (34)	99 (37)	102 (39)	106 (41)	98 (37)	84 (29)	70 (21)	55 (13)	106 (41)
Mean maximum °F (°C)	46.8 (8.2)	49.2 (9.6)	61.6 (16.4)	74.0 (23.3)	83.5 (28.6)	88.8 (31.6)	95.0 (35.0)	95.5 (35.3)	87.6 (30.9)	75.4 (24.1)	57.2 (14.0)	45.2 (7.3)	97.1 (36.2)
Mean daily maximum °F (°C)	30.7 (−0.7)	36.1 (2.3)	45.2 (7.3)	54.1 (12.3)	64.2 (17.9)	70.7 (21.5)	81.8 (27.7)	81.7 (27.6)	70.1 (21.2)	54.8 (12.7)	38.9 (3.8)	30.4 (−0.9)	54.9 (12.7)
Daily mean °F (°C)	24.3 (−4.3)	27.0 (−2.8)	35.4 (1.9)	42.7 (5.9)	51.2 (10.7)	57.6 (14.2)	64.7 (18.2)	63.8 (17.7)	54.5 (12.5)	43.4 (6.3)	32.2 (0.1)	25.3 (−3.7)	43.5 (6.4)
Mean daily minimum °F (°C)	17.8 (−7.9)	17.9 (−7.8)	25.6 (−3.6)	31.3 (−0.4)	38.1 (3.4)	44.4 (6.9)	47.6 (8.7)	46.0 (7.8)	38.9 (3.8)	32.1 (0.1)	25.5 (−3.6)	20.1 (−6.6)	32.1 (0.1)
Mean minimum °F (°C)	−6.9 (−21.6)	−1.3 (−18.5)	8.8 (−12.9)	20.6 (−6.3)	26.8 (−2.9)	33.5 (0.8)	37.7 (3.2)	36.1 (2.3)	29.0 (−1.7)	17.8 (−7.9)	9.2 (−12.7)	−1.7 (−18.7)	−12.7 (−24.8)
Record low °F (°C)	−36 (−38)	−28 (−33)	−13 (−25)	5 (−15)	18 (−8)	24 (−4)	28 (−2)	27 (−3)	16 (−9)	−2 (−19)	−10 (−23)	−40 (−40)	−40 (−40)
Average precipitation inches (mm)	2.60 (66)	2.10 (53)	1.98 (50)	1.85 (47)	2.59 (66)	3.00 (76)	1.40 (36)	1.38 (35)	1.72 (44)	2.07 (53)	3.19 (81)	2.87 (73)	26.75 (680)
Average snowfall inches (cm)	24.5 (62)	17.0 (43)	11.9 (30)	4.1 (10)	0.4 (1.0)	0.0 (0.0)	0.0 (0.0)	0.0 (0.0)	0.1 (0.25)	0.9 (2.3)	15.5 (39)	32.6 (83)	107.0 (272)
Average precipitation days (≥ 0.01 in)	12.7	10.9	11.3	8.8	11.1	11.0	4.3	5.2	7.6	9.6	11.5	14.1	118.1
Average snowy days (≥ 0.1 in)	10.4	7.4	5.0	2.3	0.1	0.0	0.0	0.0	0.0	0.5	5.9	10.3	41.9
Source 1: NOAA (precip 1981–2010)
Source 2: National Weather Service (precip days, snow/snow days 1981–2010)

== Demographics ==
Historical population
Census	Pop.	Note	%±
2020	102		—
U.S. Decennial Census

== Notable person ==
- Burke Riley, Alaska territorial and state official, was born in Swan Lake.
