= Woods Bay, Montana =

- Census-designated place
- Location of Woods Bay, Montana
- Coordinates: 48°00′11″N 114°03′37″W
- Country: United States
- State: Montana
- County: Lake

Area
  - Total: 1.37 sq mi (3.56 km^{2})
  - Land: 1.36 sq mi (3.52 km^{2})
  - Water: 0.015 sq mi (0.04 km^{2})
- Elevation: 3,084 ft (940 m)

Population (2020)
  - Total: 676
  - Density: 497.2/sq mi (191.97/km^{2})
- Time zone: UTC-7 (Mountain (MST))
  - Summer (DST): UTC-6 (MDT)
- Area code: 406
- FIPS code: 30-81700
- GNIS feature ID: 2409625

Woods Bay is a census-designated place (CDP) in Lake County, Montana, United States. As of the 2020 census, Woods Bay had a population of 676.

== Geography ==
Woods Bay is located in northern Lake County on the eastern shore of the northern end of Flathead Lake. It is bordered to the north by the community of Bigfork in Flathead County. Montana Highway 35 passes through the community, leading north 5 miles (8 km) into Bigfork and south 28 miles (45 km) to Polson, the Lake county seat. Kalispell is 22 miles (35 km) northwest of Woods Bay via highways 35, 82, and 93.

According to the United States Census Bureau, the Woods Bay CDP has a total area of 1.4 square miles (3.6 km^{2}), of which 0.02 square miles (0.04 km^{2}), or 1.15%, are water.

== Demographics ==
Historical population
Census	Pop.	Note	%±
2020	676		—
U.S. Decennial Census

As of the census of 2010, there were 661 people living in the CDP. There were 496 housing units, 287 occupied with 233 of those being owner-occupied and 209 were vacant. 524 of the total population reside in the 233 owner-occupied housing units. 172 of the vacant properties were for seasonal/recreational/occasional use.

There were 287 households, out of which 74 had children under the age of 18 living with them, 174 were married couples living together, 20 had a female householder with no husband present, and 88 were non-families. 74 of all households were made up of individuals living alone. The average household size was 2.29 and the average family size was 2.75.

The racial makeup of the CDP was 639 (96.67%) White, 5 (0.76%) Native American, 1 (0.15%) Asian, 1 (0.15%) from other races, and 15 (2.27%) from two or more races. Hispanic or Latino of any race were 14 (2.12%) out of the total.

In the CDP, the population was spread out, with 19.4% under the age of 18, 6.2% from 18 to 24, 20.6% from 25 to 44, 33.4% from 45 to 64, and 20.4% who were 65 years of age or older. The median age was 48.1 years. For every 100 females, there were 100.9 males. For every 100 females age 18 and over, there were 98.1 males.

The median income for a household in the past 12 months (2006-2010 5 year estimate) in the CDP was $26,875, and the median income for a family was $78,295. Males had a median income of $12,100 versus $4,536 for females in non-family households. About 13.5% of families and 31.2% of the population were below the poverty line, including 51.2% of those under age 18 and 0% of those age 65 or over. Approximately 91 households have received SNAP (food stamps) in the past 12 months.

Note: The margin of error in these statistics is rather high, so the accuracy may be in question, partially because it appears in Woods Bay CDP people are either very rich and live there in their vacation home seasonally or they are fairly poor and live there year-round.

== See also ==
- List of census-designated places in Montana
