= Niarada, Montana =

Unincorporated community in Montana, United States

Niarada, Montana Npq'ʷáqs yaqakxaǂq̓anwuʔkki
- Census-designated place
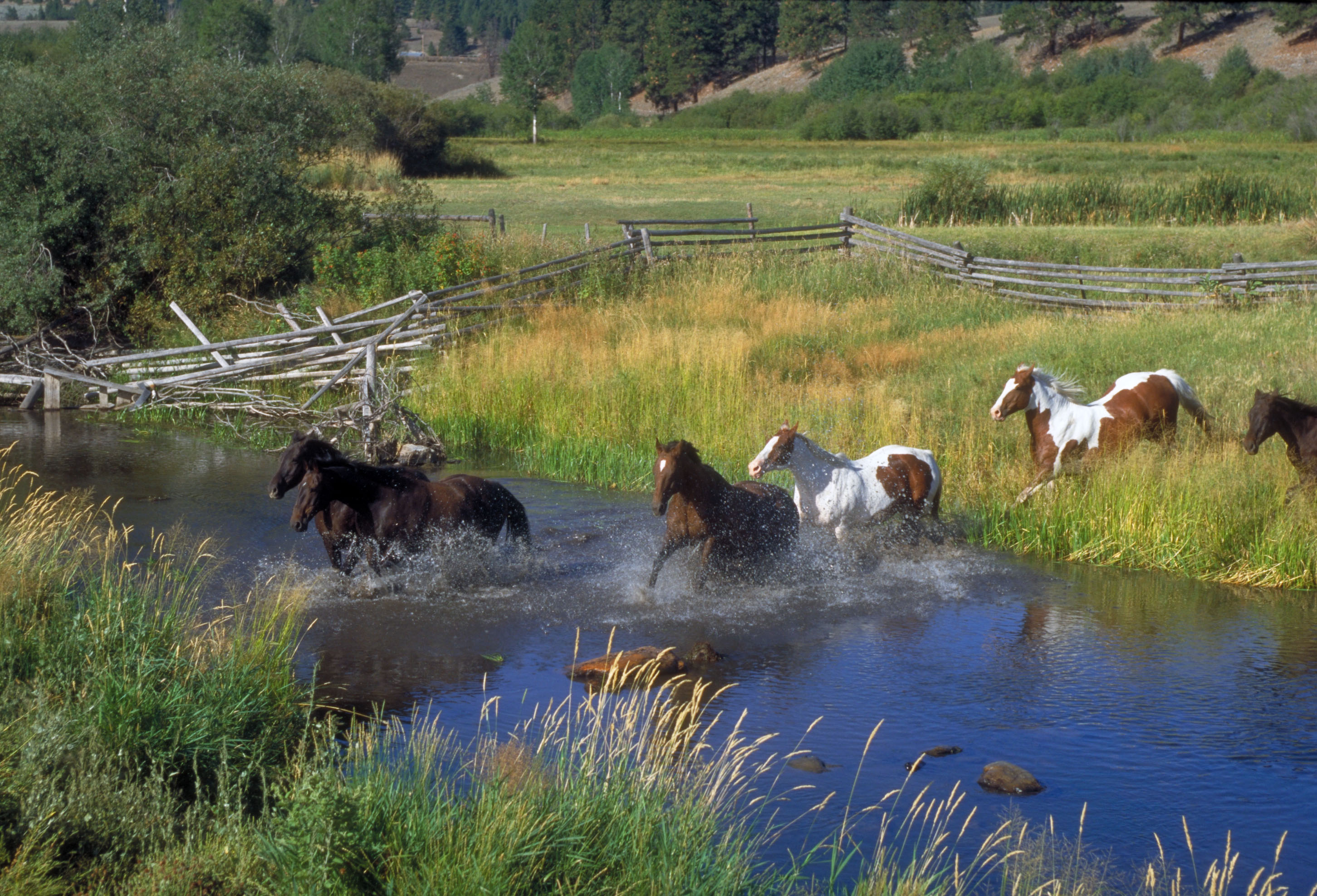
- Horses running through the creek on the McDonald Ranch, September 1999

- Location of Niarada, Montana
- Coordinates: 47°50′40″N 114°33′31″W
- Country: United States
- State: Montana
- Counties: Flathead, Lake, Sanders

Area
  - Total: 49.48 sq mi (128.15 km^{2})
  - Land: 49.48 sq mi (128.15 km^{2})
  - Water: 0 sq mi (0.00 km^{2})
- Elevation: 2,933 ft (894 m)

Population (2020)
  - Total: 28
  - Density: 0.57/sq mi (0.22/km^{2})
- Time zone: UTC-7 (Mountain (MST))
  - Summer (DST): UTC-6 (MDT)
- ZIP code: 59845
- Area code: 406
- FIPS code: 30-53725
- GNIS feature ID: 2408924

Niarada (Salish: Npq'ʷáqs, Kutenai: yaqakxaǂq̓anwuʔkki) is a census-designated place (CDP) in Flathead and Sanders counties in Montana, United States. As of the 2020 census, Niarada had a population of 28.

== Geography ==
Montana Highway 28 passes through the CDP, leading east 13 miles (21 km) to Elmo on Flathead Lake and south 34 miles (55 km) to Plains on the Clark Fork.

According to the United States Census Bureau, the CDP has a total area of 49.6 square miles (128.4 km^{2}), all land.

== Demographics ==
Historical population
Census	Pop.	Note	%±
2020	28		—
U.S. Decennial Census

As of the census of 2000, there were 50 people, 18 households, and 12 families residing in the CDP. The population density was 1.0 inhabitant per square mile (0.39/km^{2}). There were 22 housing units at an average density of 0.4 per square mile (0.15/km^{2}). The racial makeup of the CDP was 56.00% White, 34.00% Native American, 2.00% from other races, and 8.00% from two or more races. Hispanic or Latino of any race were 4.00% of the population.

There were 18 households, out of which 33.3% had children under the age of 18 living with them, 50.0% were married couples living together, 11.1% had a female householder with no husband present, and 33.3% were non-families. 27.8% of all households were made up of individuals, and 11.1% had someone living alone who was 65 years of age or older. The average household size was 2.78 and the average family size was 3.50.

In the CDP, the population was spread out, with 30.0% under the age of 18, 8.0% from 18 to 24, 28.0% from 25 to 44, 22.0% from 45 to 64, and 12.0% who were 65 years of age or older. The median age was 36 years. For every 100 females, there were 85.2 males. For every 100 females age 18 and over, there were 105.9 males.

The median income for a household in the CDP was $29,583, and the median income for a family was $29,583. Males had a median income of $13,125 versus $17,083 for females. The per capita income for the CDP was $11,388. None of the population or the families were below the poverty line.

== See also ==
- List of census-designated places in Montana
