= Wayfarers State Park =

Park in Montana, USA

- Flathead Lake with Wayfarers State Park on the opposite shore below the Swan Range

- Location within Montana
- Location: Flathead County, Montana, United States
- Nearest town: Bigfork, Montana
- Coordinates: 48°03′17″N 114°04′32″W
- Area: 67 acres (27 ha)
- Elevation: 2,923 ft (891 m)
- Established: 1969
- Visitors: 196,434 (in 2019)
- Administrator: Montana Fish, Wildlife & Parks
- Website: Wayfarers State Park

Wayfarers State Park is a 67-acre (27 ha) public recreation area overlooking Flathead Lake, one-half mile south of Bigfork, Montana. The state park hosts the annual Northern Rockies Paddlefest, which in 2013 attracted over 200 participants.

== Flora and fauna ==
The canopy is dominated by pine and fir trees, beneath which bloom seasonal wildflowers. In 1998, the Harry Horn Native Plant Garden was planted, featuring botanical education opportunities and many wildflowers including arrowleaf balsamroot, indian paintbrush, silky lupine, and death camas.

== Activities and amenities ==
The park offers 30 campsites and a boat ramp. Visitors may access the boat ramp for aquatic activities, and fisherman may fish the waters of Flathead Lake. In 2016, development plans were announced by Montana State Parks for the improvement of a bicycle campground area to feature spots for 10 campsites and bicycle-related amenities.
