= Montana Highway 28 =

State highway in Montana, United States

Montana Highway 28
- MT 28 highlighted in red

Route information
- Maintained by MDT
- Length: 46.734 mi (75.211 km)
- Existed: 1924–present

Major junctions
- South end: MT 200 in Plains
- North end: US 93 in Elmo

Location
- Country: United States
- State: Montana
- Counties: Sanders, Lake, Flathead

Highway system
- Montana Highway System; Interstate; US; State; Secondary
← MT 25	→ MT 35

Montana Highway 28 (MT 28) is an approximately 46.7-mile-long (75.2 km) state highway in the west of the US state of Montana. It begins at MT 200 in Plains and ends at U.S. Highway 93 (US 93) in Elmo; all but the first 7.5 miles (12.1 km) are within the Flathead Indian Reservation. It serves as a key link in two alternate routes between Spokane, Washington, and Kalispell.

== Route description ==
MT 28 begins at the eastern outskirts of Plains, at an intersection with MT 200. Initially, the highway winds northeasterly as it climbs through steep forest terrain before descending towards the plains again. At the bottom of this ridge, MT 28 heads north as it meets Secondary Highway 382 (S-382), and shortly after that intersects with MT 77, the road to Hot Springs. About two miles (3.2 km) north, it meets Little Bitterroot Road, which connects to S-211 and the city of Ronan. As MT 28 continues north, it briefly enters Lake County and the Niarada area before it crosses into Flathead County and curves eastward across the southernmost and western part of the county. After passing Browns Meadow Road, MT 28 passes through a bighorn sheep crossing area (mileposts 37–40) before it re-enters Lake County. The highway then curves north and descends a final hill before curving east to its northern terminus at US 93 on the north edge of Elmo, overlooking Flathead Lake.

== History ==
MT 28 was originally routed through Hot Springs and Camas as seen on the 1935-36 state maps, with northbound traffic entering Hot Springs at the southwest corner of the city (today's Old Hot Springs Road), turning east on Central Avenue and north on Spring Street, and exiting the northeast corner of the city as it headed north and east to Camas (today's Chisholm Road).

The highway was rerouted along its current alignment east of those communities between Rainbow Lake (approximate milepost 11) and Lonepine during 1937-39 (seen as under construction on the maps), and completed as of the 1940 map. Hot Springs Road was built .c. 1939 to connect Hot Springs to the new routing of MT 28. Traffic for Camas from the new routing follows the old routing west and south on Chisholm Road.

The most recent realignment widened and straightened the section of the highway from northern Sanders County through Flathead County in 2011.

== Major intersections ==
County	Location	mi	km	Destinations	Notes
Sanders	Plains	0.00	0.00	MT 200 – Thompson Falls, Missoula	Southern terminus
Sanders		16.347	26.308	S-382 south – Perma	
Sanders		18.980	30.545	MT 77 west (Hot Springs Road) – Hot Springs	
Sanders		20.937	33.695	To S-211 east (Little Bitterroot Road) – Ronan	Connects to Ronan via Sloan Road and S-211
Lake	No major junctions				
Flathead	No major junctions				
Lake	Elmo	46.734	75.211	US 93 – Kalispell, Polson	Northern terminus
1.000 mi = 1.609 km; 1.000 km = 0.621 mi
