= Swan Range =

Mountain range in Montana, United States

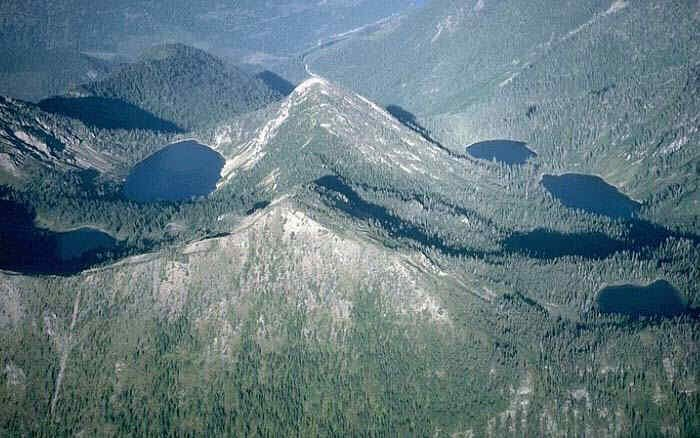
- The Jewel Basin part of the Swan Range

Highest point
- Peak: 9,356 feet (2,852 m), Holland Peak

Dimensions
- Length: 91 mi (146 km) north-south
- Width: 66 mi (106 km) east-west
- Area: 1,961 km^{2} (757 mi^{2})

Naming
- Etymology: Named for Emmett Swan or named for trumpeter swans on Swan Lake

Geography
- Country: United States
- States: Montana
- County: Flathead
- Settlements: Kalispell and Bigfork
- Range coordinates: 47°43.5′N 113°37.6′W

The Swan Range is a mountain range in western Montana in the United States. Its peaks typically rise to around 8,000 to 9,000 feet (2,400 to 2,700 m). The range is bounded by the South Fork Flathead River to the east, the Flathead River to the north and northwest, the Swan River to the west, and lie to the southwest of Glacier National Park, just south of the Canada–US border. It runs about 99 miles (159 km) from north-northwest to south-southeast. Major cities near the Swan Range include Kalispell and Bigfork to the northwest, and Seeley Lake on the south.

== Etymology ==
The range shares its name with Swan Lake and the 93-mile (150 km) long, north flowing Swan River on its west side. The name may have originated from trumpeter swans that once populated Swan Lake, but none are found there today. The river, range and lake may have also been named after Emmett Swan, a long-time resident of the Swan Valley.

== Geography ==
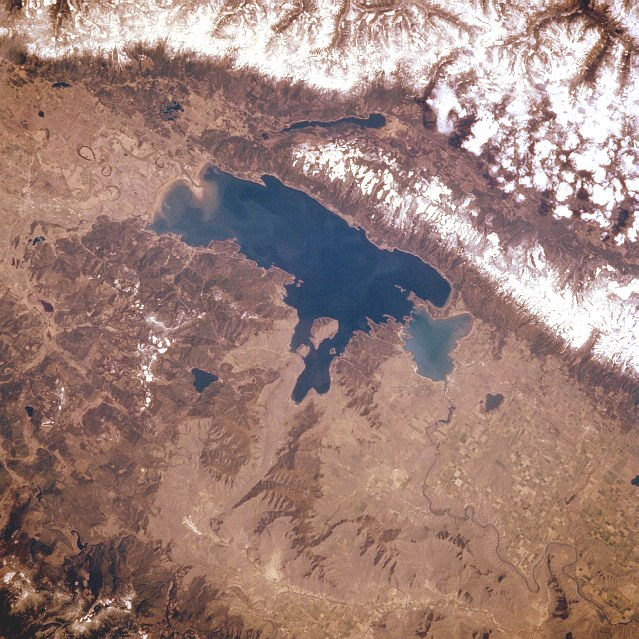
Satellite view of the Flathead River Valley with the Swan Range in the upper quarter of the image

The Swan Range, part of the Kootenay Mountains, is bordered by the Mission Range, a smaller mountain range, to the west, and by the similar-sized Flathead Range to the east and northeast. It is about 99 miles (159 km) north to south and 66 miles (106 km) wide. The highest peak is 9,356-foot (2,852 m) Holland Peak, situated in the southern quarter of the range in Missoula County. Streams running off the east side of the range drain into the 98-mile (158 km) South Fork Flathead River. The 50-mile (80 km) long Hungry Horse Reservoir, formed by damming the South Fork, lies to the northeast. Badrock Canyon, through which flows the Flathead River, separates the Swan Range from the Whitefish Range in the north. The range is part of the Pend Oreille River drainage basin, which eventually drains to the Columbia River.

The Swan River forms much of the western boundary of the range, flowing through a broad valley between the Swan and Mission ranges. Flathead Lake, the second largest freshwater lake in the western US, is situated west of the Swan Range and separated from it by the Mission Range. The Swan Range's boundary with the Flathead Range slowly diminishes as it progresses south - it is in the middle and north parts that this boundary is clearly distinguished. Many of the valleys dissecting the Swan Range drain into the South Fork of the Flathead - the water divide of the range lies more to the west.

The range is most commonly stated to top out at 9,000 feet (2,700 m), but the National Geographic Society and some early sources place Swan Peak - the second highest mountain in the range - at 11,000 feet (3,400 m), and state that it is the highest mountain. "The range to the east of [the Swan River valley] is the Swan Range. It is the highest and least broken ridge in the region, the higher peaks rising to ten and eleven thousand feet."

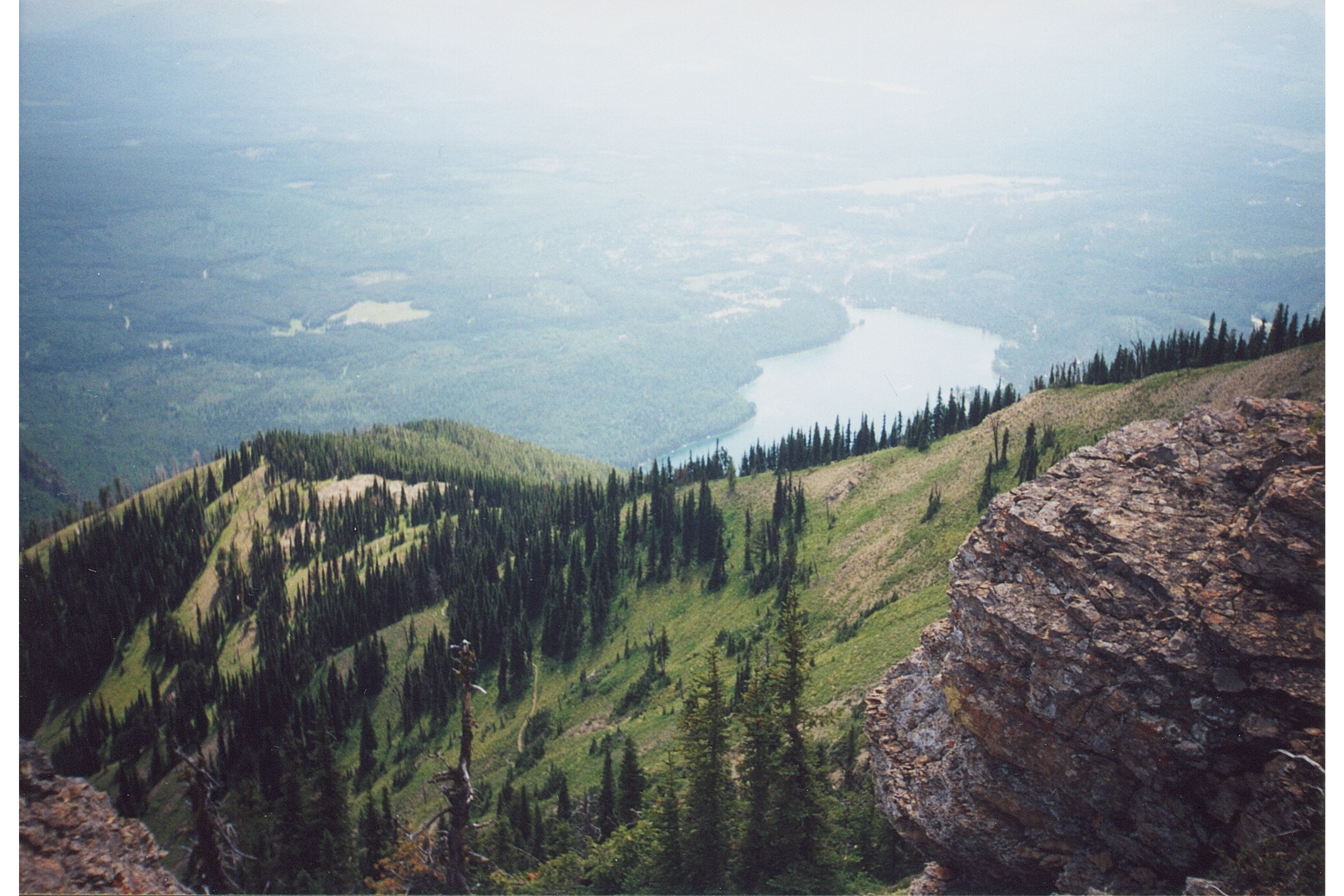
Looking west from the Swan Range crest, near Holland Lake

Listed from north to south, the cities and towns bordering the Swan Range are Columbia Falls, La Salle, Creston, Bigfork, Seeley Lake and Lincoln. While the southern part lies in the Bob Marshall Wilderness and the east part is largely undeveloped, the west side is used for some ranching and parallels Montana Highway 83.

=== Highest peaks ===
5 highest peaks of the Swan Range
Name	Height	Prominence
Holland Peak	9,356 feet (2,852 m)	4,036 feet (1,230 m)
Swan Peak	9,289 feet (2,831 m)	2,329 feet (710 m)
Ptarmigan Benchmark	9,083 feet (2,768 m)	2,483 feet (757 m)
Goat Mountain	8,845 feet (2,696 m)	1,765 feet (538 m)
Cardinal Peak	8,582 feet (2,616 m)	1,342 feet (409 m)

=== Climate ===
Climate data for Holland Peak 47.5330 N, 113.5857 W, Elevation: 8,632 ft (2,631 m) (1991–2020 normals)
Month	Jan	Feb	Mar	Apr	May	Jun	Jul	Aug	Sep	Oct	Nov	Dec	Year
Mean daily maximum °F (°C)	23.6 (−4.7)	23.8 (−4.6)	28.6 (−1.9)	34.2 (1.2)	43.4 (6.3)	50.8 (10.4)	61.9 (16.6)	62.1 (16.7)	53.0 (11.7)	39.2 (4.0)	27.7 (−2.4)	22.3 (−5.4)	39.2 (4.0)
Daily mean °F (°C)	17.1 (−8.3)	16.0 (−8.9)	19.7 (−6.8)	24.8 (−4.0)	33.3 (0.7)	40.2 (4.6)	50.0 (10.0)	50.1 (10.1)	41.9 (5.5)	30.6 (−0.8)	21.4 (−5.9)	16.2 (−8.8)	30.1 (−1.1)
Mean daily minimum °F (°C)	10.7 (−11.8)	8.3 (−13.2)	10.7 (−11.8)	15.3 (−9.3)	23.1 (−4.9)	29.7 (−1.3)	38.0 (3.3)	38.6 (3.7)	30.8 (−0.7)	21.9 (−5.6)	15.0 (−9.4)	10.1 (−12.2)	21.0 (−6.1)
Average precipitation inches (mm)	8.55 (217)	7.52 (191)	6.64 (169)	6.30 (160)	4.90 (124)	4.87 (124)	1.76 (45)	1.91 (49)	3.48 (88)	5.31 (135)	8.63 (219)	7.34 (186)	67.21 (1,707)
Source: PRISM Climate Group

Climate data for Swan Peak 47.7195 N, 113.6431 W, Elevation: 8,504 ft (2,592 m) (1991–2020 normals)
Month	Jan	Feb	Mar	Apr	May	Jun	Jul	Aug	Sep	Oct	Nov	Dec	Year
Mean daily maximum °F (°C)	22.9 (−5.1)	23.6 (−4.7)	29.1 (−1.6)	34.5 (1.4)	43.7 (6.5)	50.9 (10.5)	62.0 (16.7)	62.1 (16.7)	52.7 (11.5)	38.8 (3.8)	27.2 (−2.7)	21.5 (−5.8)	39.1 (3.9)
Daily mean °F (°C)	16.7 (−8.5)	16.2 (−8.8)	20.4 (−6.4)	25.4 (−3.7)	33.9 (1.1)	40.7 (4.8)	50.5 (10.3)	50.5 (10.3)	42.3 (5.7)	30.7 (−0.7)	21.1 (−6.1)	15.7 (−9.1)	30.3 (−0.9)
Mean daily minimum °F (°C)	10.6 (−11.9)	8.7 (−12.9)	11.6 (−11.3)	16.3 (−8.7)	24.1 (−4.4)	30.6 (−0.8)	38.9 (3.8)	38.9 (3.8)	31.8 (−0.1)	22.6 (−5.2)	15.0 (−9.4)	9.9 (−12.3)	21.6 (−5.8)
Average precipitation inches (mm)	9.92 (252)	7.92 (201)	8.41 (214)	8.28 (210)	6.66 (169)	7.13 (181)	2.07 (53)	2.21 (56)	3.82 (97)	6.57 (167)	9.11 (231)	8.92 (227)	81.02 (2,058)
Source: PRISM Climate Group

Flathead Lake at Lakeside with Swan and Mission Range in the background

== See also ==
- List of mountain ranges in Montana
- North Fork Flathead River

== Works cited ==
- Federal Writers' Project (1939). Montana: A State Guide Book. U.S. History Publishers. ISBN 1-60354-025-3.
- National Geographic Society (1902). National Geographic Magazine (Volume 13). Harvard University.
