= Conservation of painted turtles =

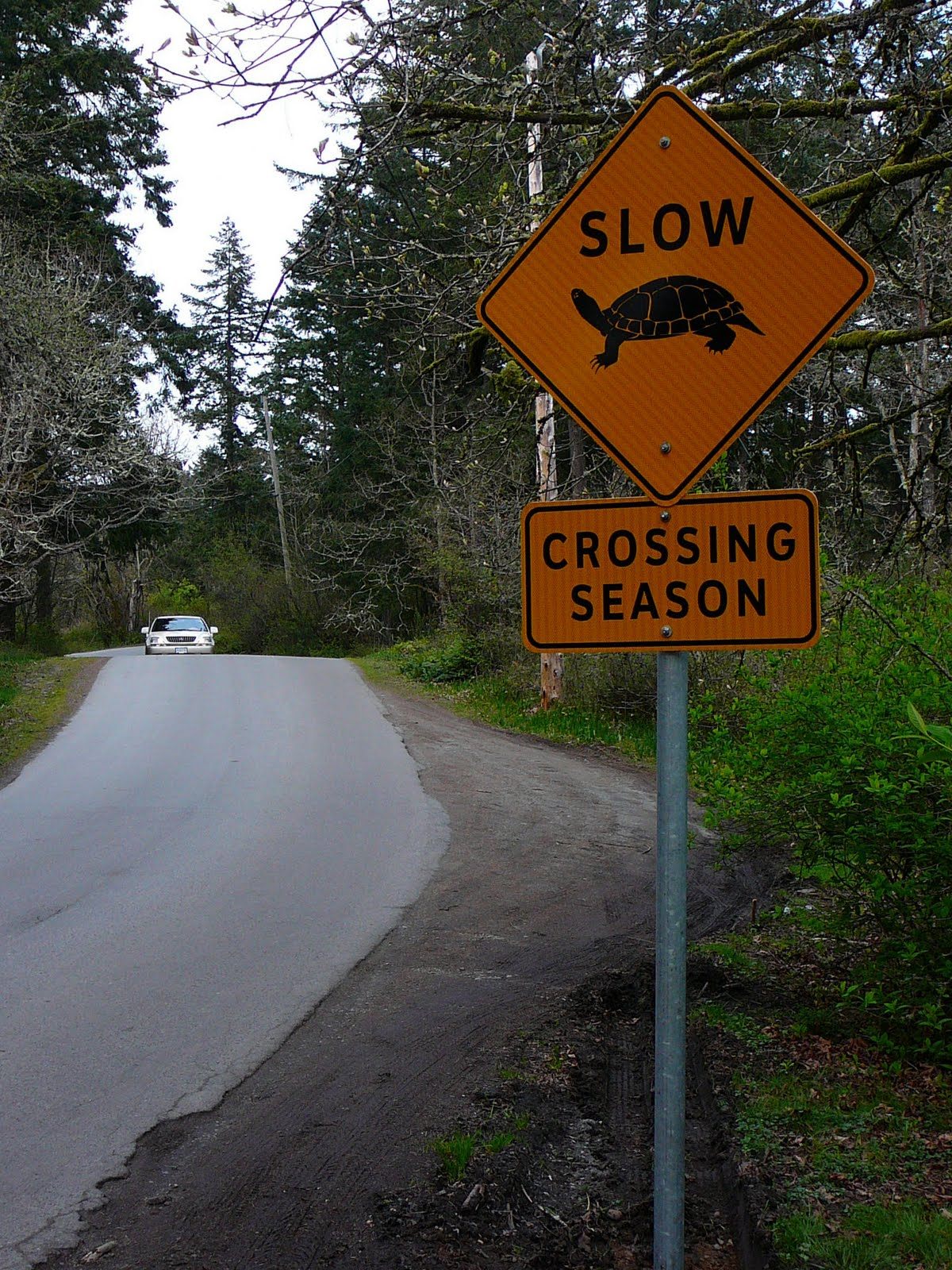
British Columbia road sign

The decline in painted turtle populations is not a simple story of dramatic range reduction, such as the American bison. Instead, the turtle remains numerous and occupies its original range—it is classified as G5 (demonstrably widespread) in its Natural Heritage Global Rank—however, the settlement of North America has undoubtedly reduced its population density. Since at least 1952, scientists have noted human impact on the painted turtle. Ernst and Lovich, in their 2009 turtle almanac, acknowledge that estimates of species-specific population changes are lacking, but say that it is useful to discuss general factors affecting all turtles. However, these pressures are generally more pressing on turtles of the sea, estuary or land, or already rare turtles. The painted turtle's high reproduction rates and its ability to survive in habitats affected by humans, such as polluted wetlands and artificially made ponds, have allowed it to maintain its range. In New England, the Turtle Conservation Project notes: "Ironically, prime habitat has been created by fertilizer runoff, creating vegetation-clogged lakes; just what Painted Turtles like."

Only at the extremities of the Pacific Northwest is the turtle's actual range eroding. Even there, in Washington, the painted turtle is common: it is designated S5 (demonstrably widespread). However, further south, in Oregon (the north third of the state is painted turtle range), the painted turtle is designated S2 (imperiled). There, federal, state and Portland city governments are working to better understand and arrest the decline of the painted turtle. North of Washington, in British Columbia, the turtle is also in peril. There coastal populations are designated as endangered and Interior populations are designated as "of special concern". The iconic painted turtle is popular in British Columbia and the province is further motivated to stop the loss of the painted turtle because it has already lost all populations of its other native turtle species, the western pond turtle. However, despite conservation efforts, only a few thousand turtles remain in the entire province.

Much has been written about the different factors that harm the painted turtle. Essentially all factors are unquantified and at most only some inferences of which factors are more relatively severe are described.

== Habitat loss ==
An obvious threat to painted turtles comes from habitat loss by drying of wetlands. Even when water remains, the turtles may be impacted by the clearing of logs or rocks that provide basking sites. Also, clearing of shorelines' vegetation may make allow more predator access, or increased human foot traffic, which make onshore basking untenable. Away from the water, urbanization or vegetation-planting, even for stream restoration, can remove the open sunny soils needed for nesting.

== Roadkill ==
Another visible and probably numerically significant human impact is roadkill. Dead turtles are commonly seen on summer roads: in 1974, Ernst measured 14 deaths in a single day on one short stretch of Pennsylvania road. Increased traffic as well as increased road penetration of habitat have worsened the problem over the years.

A study of turtles near Highway 92 in Montana showed that turtle populations near the road were an order of magnitude smaller than those a few miles away. The near-road populations were also skewed to being much younger. Both findings suggested the road was killing substantial numbers of near roaf turtles and that those populations depended on replacements coming from hatchlings from the far from road populations.

Turtle surveys near busy roads showed that males strongly outnumbered females. This suggests most road casualties were nesting females. Males roaming for mates or changing waters from drought could usually find water routes to move along, but the females had to come on land to lay eggs. In addition to direct killing, roads impact some painted turtles indirectly by isolating populations genetically.

Various roadkill reduction efforts are being tried. Portland, Oregon built an undercrossing, for $160,000, which the turtles have learned to use. In 2012, Montana will build highway barriers on US Route 93 near Ninepipe National Wildlife Refuge. Less dramatic interventions have included road signs ("turtle crossing") as well as public education. States counsel drivers to avoid turtles by safely swerving, when possible, or by assisting turtles in crossing. Oregon's Regional Conservation Biologist, Susan Barnes, writes, "Stopping to help a turtle cross a road is always a question of human safety. If you can safely get off the road and carry the turtle to the side of the road in the direction it is headed, it's O.K."

== Introduced species ==
Oregon conservation video: 0:30–0:60 conservation factors; 1:50–2:00 hoop trap.(If video play problematic, see or for alternative video streams.)

The introduction of non-native species is another threat to the painted turtle. Red-eared sliders are the most common pet turtle and are native to the US Southeast only. They have been widely released (or escaped) and have established breeding populations in many parts of the painted turtle range, including Canada. They are a similar species in size and habits to the painted turtle, so they may be added competition, but the impact is uncertain. In the eastern United States, the painted turtle already shares territory with yellow-bellied and Cumberland sliders (which mix readily with red-eared sliders), so there, the pet-released invasions are less likely to be a significant new threat.

In the West, several predators of youngling painted turtles have been introduced into waters where they never roamed before: bass, snapping turtles, and bullfrogs. Examination of bullfrogs and bass in Montana shows they are consuming few painted turtles. Snapping turtles may have more impact and, in Oregon, aggressive trapping has been done to remove them.

In urban areas, increased egg-eating raccoons, foxes, and coyotes, as well as feral dogs or cats, may impact painted turtles. Some cities have experimented with nest enclosures to screen out predators.

== Other concerns ==
Taking painted turtles from and releasing them into wetlands can both be harmful. Initially, local populations may be decimated by over-collection as most adults for sale are from the wild. Ernst recounts an example of a pet collector in Pennsylvania removing an entire water body's turtles. Later, pet releases may introduce salmonella or poor genes to wild populations.

Pollution may be a danger in a few different ways: pesticides for mosquitos killing off aquatic prey in turtle ponds, herbicides hurting aquatic vegetation, or just generalized water pollution impacting turtles. However, no definite impacts have been quantified.

Outdoor recreation also affects turtles. Boating traffic near basking sites can disturb painted turtles. Some turtles die inadvertently on fisherman's hooks—the turtles are noteworthy for stealing bait. Oregon is considering stream access modifications to reduce wanton shooting.

Gervais notes that turtle research itself impacts the populations. Many turtle surveys have been done, which did not result in publication. She advocates developing computer-based population models instead, to better understand evolution of painted turtle numbers, and reserving catch and release studies to test specific hypotheses.

Similar to road deaths, agricultural machinery kill females and destroy nests. Some states describe death from lawnmowers (particularly on golf courses). Others warn against indiscrimante all-terrain vehicle riding affecting the turtles. Global warming represents an uncharacterized future threat.
