= Montana Highway 77 =

State highway in Montana, United States

Montana Highway 77
- Hot Springs Road
- MT 77 highlighted in red

Route information
- Maintained by MDT
- Length: 1.991 mi (3.204 km)
- Existed: c. 1939–present

Major junctions
- West end: Hot Springs city limits
- East end: MT 28 east of Hot Springs

Location
- Country: United States
- State: Montana
- Counties: Sanders

Highway system
- Montana Highway System; Interstate; US; State; Secondary
← MT 72	→ MT 78

Montana Highway 77 (MT 77), also known as Hot Springs Road, is an approximately 1.99-mile-long (3.20 km) state highway in the west of the US state of Montana, and it is a spur route to connect MT 28 to the city of Hot Springs. The entire route is within the Flathead Indian Reservation.

== Route description ==
MT 77 begins at the intersection with MT 28, and proceeds due west until reaching the Hot Springs city limits, where Hot Springs Road becomes Broadway Avenue.

== History ==
Hot Springs Road was created in order to link the community with MT 28, when it was rerouted to the east of the city circa 1939, as seen on the 1940 state map. The 1942 road log refers to it simply as the "Hot Springs Spur" under Federal Aid Primary Route 36 (the official state designation for MT 28, which is still used today).

The highway was designated MT 77 on July 1, 1976, and appears in the 1978 road log as Primary Route 77. And even though the route number is not shown on the state map, one can see it change from the generic solid black used for secondary paved roads on the 1977 map to the solid red used for primary paved roads on the 1978 edition.

The highway is now part of the state's "off-system" routes, designated with a primary route number but not listed in the most recent (2013) road log. (See MT 38 and MT 49 for two other examples.)

== Major intersections ==
The entire highway is in Sanders County.

Location	mi	km	Destinations	Notes
	0.00	0.00	MT 28 – Elmo, Plains	Eastern terminus
Hot Springs	1.991	3.204	Broadway Avenue	Western terminus at city limits
1.000 mi = 1.609 km; 1.000 km = 0.621 mi
