= Swan River (Montana) =

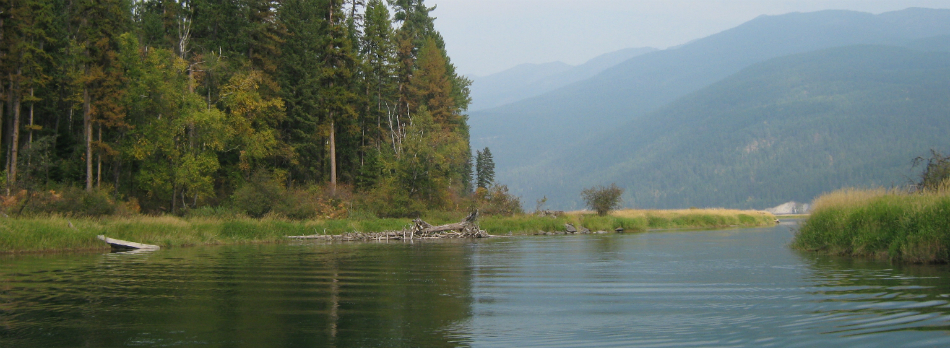
- Swan River National Wildlife Refuge

Location
- Country: United States
- State: Montana

Physical characteristics
- Source: Gray Wolf Lake
  - location: Mission Mountains, Missoula County
  - coordinates: 47°17′48″N 113°52′04″W
  - elevation: 6,650 ft (2,030 m)
- Mouth: Flathead Lake
  - location: Bigfork, Flathead County
  - coordinates: 48°03′35″N 114°04′51″W
  - elevation: 2,897 ft (883 m)
- Length: 95 mi (153 km)
- Basin size: 671 mi^{2} (1,740 km^{2})
- Discharge
  - location: river mile 14.0, near Bigfork
  - average: 1,155 cu ft/s (32.7 m^{3}/s)
  - minimum: 193 cu ft/s (5.5 m^{3}/s)
  - maximum: 8,890 cu ft/s (252 m^{3}/s)

The Swan River is a 95-mile (153 km) long, north-flowing river in western Montana in the United States. The river drains a long isolated valley, known as the Swan Valley, between the Swan Range on the east and the Mission Mountains to the west.

== History ==
On an 1884 Rand McNally map, the Swan River and Swan Lake are referred to as the Sweatinghouse River and the Sweatinghouse Lake. However, by 1895, most maps had adopted Swan, a name apparently proposed by early English hunters in the area and acknowledged by the locals, according to Ken Wolf’s 1980 Montana Magazine article “History of the Swan Valley.” Henry Coale quoted a local 1914 report that "Twenty years ago Trumpeter Swans were common in Montana, and used regularly to winter here, but are now on the verge of extinction." He indicated that the Kootenai Indians generally reported that swans bred in the Flathead Valley up to the first immigration of whites in 1886... Coale described swans nesting historically at Lake Rodgers, at Swan Lake, and on the east side of Flathead Lake, and on the lakes which drain Clearwater, a branch of the Big Blackfoot River.

== Course ==
The Swan originates at Gray Wolf Lake in the Mission Mountains, at 6,650 feet (2,030 m) above sea level. Fed partly by melt from the Gray Wolf Glacier, the river descends through a short and steep canyon to Lindbergh Lake, at the base of the Mission Mountains. From there the river flows briefly east before turning north, passing Condon, flowing about 75 miles (121 km) to the northern end of the valley where it empties into Swan Lake. At the north end of the 10-mile (16 km) long lake, the river emerges into the Flathead Valley, where it turns abruptly west through a canyon, emptying into Flathead Lake at the town of Bigfork. Via Flathead Lake, it eventually drains to the Flathead River, a major tributary in the Columbia River system.

The river is fed by many tributaries descending from the mountains along both sides of its valley. On the west side, streams draining the Mission Mountains into the Swan River include Glacier, Elk, Cold, Jim, Piper, Woodward, Whitetail, and Porcupine Creeks. Eastern tributaries, flowing off the Swan Range, include Holland, Smith, Alder, Lion, Goat, Soup, and Lost Creeks. Below Swan Lake, the river is also joined by Bear and Mud Creeks from the east.

Montana Highway 83 roughly parallels the river from the Bigfork area to near Lindbergh Lake.

== Watershed ==
The Swan River watershed drains 671 square miles (1,740 km^{2}) and extends into parts of Missoula County, Lake County and a small portion of Flathead County. The glacial Swan Valley is considered Montana's most water-rich watershed, with over 4,000 lakes, ponds and wetlands that encompass about 16 percent of the total area. There are an estimated 1,300 miles (2,100 km) of rivers and streams in the watershed.

The watershed is very lightly populated with a density of slightly less than 1.6 people per square mile. The total human population, which is concentrated in the northern end of the valley near Bigfork, is estimated at 1,000. The main economic activity in the watershed is logging.

Geologically, the Swan Valley forms a continuous trough with the valley drained by the Clearwater River, which flows south through Seeley Lake to join the Blackfoot River. The valleys of the two rivers are known locally as the Seeley-Swan.

== History ==
There are two theories of the origin of the name "Swan River". In the 1880s Swan Lake was reported to have a large population of trumpeter swans, although none are present there today and contemporary claims remain anecdotal. Another possibility is that the river and lake were named after Emmett Swan, one of the first white settlers in Swan Valley.

The U.S. Forest Service permitted commercial logging in the Swan Valley starting in 1907. Early logging activity in the valley was accompanied by attempts to float timber down the Swan River, which was difficult because of the river's narrow and winding course. As a result, most of the timber ended up piled on the banks and along sandbars, forming log jams that persist to this day.

The Swan Valley Massacre of 1908 was an altercation between native people of the Pend d'Oreilles tribe and a Montana game warden, in which four Native Americans and the warden were killed. It was the result of a dispute over tribal hunting rights outside of reservation boundaries, which the Montana government reputedly did not honor at the time.

== River modifications ==
The Bigfork Dam impounds the Swan River at the rapids about 1 mile (1.6 km) above its mouth, to generate about 4,000 kilowatts of hydroelectricity at peak load. The dam and reservoir are operated by PacifiCorp. Originally built in 1902, the dam was constructed with a fish ladder which proved ineffective, as a result isolating the Swan River's fish populations from Flathead Lake.

== Recreation ==
The stretch of the river between Bigfork Dam and Flathead Lake, known as the "Wild Mile" for its drop of over 100 feet (30 m), is known for its extremely difficult Class V+ whitewater. The Bigfork Whitewater Festival takes place in mid-May each year along this section. Above Bigfork Dam, the river is calmer, but can be dangerous when running high in the spring. The river is also known for its log jams, which pose a significant hazard to boaters.

The river is also known for excellent fishing for bull trout. However, bull trout numbers have been declining since the introduction of lake trout, most likely around 1998 when anglers reported catching them in the river.

== See also ==
- List of rivers of Montana
- Montana Stream Access Law
- Swan River National Wildlife Refuge
