= Somers, Montana =

Unincorporated community in Montana, United States

- Census-designated place
- Location of Somers, Montana
- Coordinates: 48°04′38″N 114°14′40″W
- Country: United States
- State: Montana
- County: Flathead

Area
  - Total: 3.00 sq mi (7.78 km^{2})
  - Land: 2.95 sq mi (7.64 km^{2})
  - Water: 0.054 sq mi (0.14 km^{2})
- Elevation: 3,022 ft (921 m)

Population (2020)
  - Total: 1,049
  - Density: 355.6/sq mi (137.31/km^{2})
- Time zone: UTC-7 (Mountain (MST))
  - Summer (DST): UTC-6 (MDT)
- ZIP code: 59932
- Area code: 406
- FIPS code: 30-69475
- GNIS feature ID: 2408755

Somers is an unincorporated community and census-designated place (CDP) in Flathead County, Montana, United States. The population was 1,049 at the 2020 census, nearly double from 556 in the 2000 census.

== History ==
Great Northern Railway magnate James J. Hill contracted to build a sawmill on the north end of Flathead Lake in 1900. A town was developed for the workers. The town was named for George O. Somers, a Vice President of the Great Northern Railroad, and the person responsible for overseeing the development of the new lumber town.

In 1909, the Industrial Worker, a newspaper published out of Seattle by the Industrial Workers of the World, described Somers thus:

The nearest approach to hell on earth is at Somers, Mont. The principal industry at Somers is sawing railroad ties for Jim Hill. Jimmy owns everything around Somers including the water, docks, sawmills, county roads, and all the land that the town is situated on. Jimmy also owns the United States postoffice and nearly all the judges and lawyers in Flathead county.

— F. W. Heslewood

The IWW at the time was in dispute with Jim Hill in connection with strike waves throughout the Flathead Valley, especially centered in Kalispell. Sawmill workers organized with the IWW struck at the Somers Lumber Company, with company management quickly hiring scab labor and blacklisting union members as a result. Tensions reached their peak in late July 1909, when the IWW warned unemployed workers to stay away from Somers to avoid the conditions there.

In 2023, a 106-acre site was designated Somers Beach State Park. Once developed there will be day-use amenities and a hand launch area for boats.

== Geography ==
Somers is located in south-central Flathead County at the north end of Flathead Lake. It is bordered to the south by Lakeside. The Mission Mountains are to the east and Salish Mountains to the west.

According to the United States Census Bureau, the Somers CDP has a total area of 3.0 square miles (7.8 km^{2}), of which 2.9 square miles (7.6 km^{2}) is land and 0.04 square miles (0.1 km^{2}), or 1.86%, is water.

== Demographics ==
Historical population
Census	Pop.	Note	%±
2000	556		—
2010	1,109		99.5%
2020	1,049		−5.4%
U.S. Decennial Census

As of the census of 2000, there were 556 people, 233 households, and 158 families residing in the CDP. The population density was 269.6 inhabitants per square mile (104.1/km^{2}). There were 263 housing units at an average density of 127.5 per square mile (49.2/km^{2}). The racial makeup of the CDP was 96.04% White, 0.36% African American, 1.08% Native American, 1.08% from other races, and 1.44% from two or more races. Hispanic or Latino of any race were 3.96% of the population.

There were 233 households, out of which 29.2% had children under the age of 18 living with them, 54.9% were married couples living together, 8.2% had a female householder with no husband present, and 31.8% were non-families. 23.6% of all households were made up of individuals, and 5.6% had someone living alone who was 65 years of age or older. The average household size was 2.38 and the average family size was 2.85.

In the CDP, the population was spread out, with 23.6% under the age of 18, 8.8% from 18 to 24, 28.8% from 25 to 44, 24.3% from 45 to 64, and 14.6% who were 65 years of age or older. The median age was 39 years. For every 100 females, there were 109.0 males. For every 100 females age 18 and over, there were 103.3 males.

The median income for a household in the CDP was $30,625, and the median income for a family was $34,286. Males had a median income of $33,125 versus $17,500 for females. The per capita income for the CDP was $13,786. About 7.9% of families and 7.6% of the population were below the poverty line, including 9.0% of those under age 18 and 4.3% of those age 65 or over.

== Education ==
Somers School District has two schools, Lakeside Elementary School and Somers Middle School. For the 2021–2022 school year, a total of 568 students were enrolled.

Students attend Flathead High School in Kalispell for grades 9–12.

== Media ==
Local news is covered by the Daily Inter Lake, a newspaper based in Kalispell.

The FM radio station KFLF is licensed in Somers.

== Infrastructure ==
U.S. Route 93 passes through the community, leading north 9 miles (14 km) to Kalispell and south 42 miles (68 km) to Polson at the other end of Flathead Lake. Montana Highway 82 is a highway connecting Somers to Bigfork in the east.

The nearest airport is Glacier Park International Airport.
