= Northwest Montana Wetland Management District =

- IUCN category IV (habitat/species management area)
- Location within the United States
- Location: Montana, USA
- Nearest city: Kalispell, MT
- Coordinates: 47°53′53″N 113°51′17″W
- Area: 14,752 acres (59.70 km^{2})
- Established: 1970
- Governing body: U.S. Fish and Wildlife Service
- Website: Northwest Montana Wetland Management District

The Northwest Montana Wetland Management District is a wildlife management region in the U.S. state of Montana, a part of the National Bison Range Complex along with four other wildlife refuges and the National Bison Range.

== History ==
The individual lands were acquired beginning in 1970 by purchasing plots from willing landowners, and an ongoing effort to continue to increase area.

== Background ==
The district comprises numerous small wetland environments set aside primarily to protect areas for waterfowl. The district comprises 14 separate Waterfowl Production Areas (WPA)'s totalling 8,452 acres (3,420 ha) and one 6,300 acres (2,500 ha) conservation easement along the north shores of Flathead Lake. Some of the land is located on the Flathead Indian Reservation (known as the Tribal Trust Lands of the Confederated Salish and Kootenai Tribes) and they continue to have claim over the land provided they assist in maintaining the resource. The Northwest Montana Wetland Management District is administered by the United States Fish and Wildlife Service, an agency within the United States Department of the Interior.

Of the 200 species of birds reportedly observed on district lands, Canada goose, peregrine falcon, green-winged teal, meadowlark, owls, ring-necked pheasant, great blue heron and numerous species of ducks can be found here. Small mammals such as the porcupine, muskrat, mink, beaver and skunk are also common.

Kalispell, Montana is within 12 mi (19 km) of many of the different locations.
