= Montana Highway 35 =

State highway in Montana, United States

Montana Highway 35
- MT 35 highlighted in red

Route information
- Maintained by MDT
- Length: 50.669 mi (81.544 km)

Major junctions
- South end: US 93 in Polson
- North end: US 2 at Evergreen

Location
- Country: United States
- State: Montana
- Counties: Lake, Flathead

Highway system
- Montana Highway System; Interstate; US; State; Secondary
← MT 28	→ MT 37

Montana Highway 35 (MT 35) is an approximately 51-mile-long (82 km) state highway in the west of the US state of Montana. It begins at U.S. Highway 93 in Polson in the Flathead Indian Reservation and ends at U.S. Highway 2 in Evergreen, the eastern portion of the city of Kalispell. As well as serving the townships along the eastern shore of Flathead Lake, it also serves as a de facto alternative route of US 93 between Polson and Kalispell.

== Route description ==
MT 35 begins within the Flathead Indian Reservation, in the eastern outskirts of Polson, at an intersection with US 93. Initially, the highway heads east in a straight line. After a few miles, the road takes an abrupt turn northwards as it meets the foothills of the Mission Mountains. Passing Flathead Lake's East Bay, it then forms the eastern boundary of the community of Finley Point. Meeting Skidoo Bay of the lake, MT 35 is then squeezed between the shoreline on its left and the mountain range on its right and is forced by the topography to wind its way northwards between the two. After leaving the Flathead Indian Reservation, the road passes through the community of Woods Bay before crossing from Lake to Flathead County. Very soon afterwards, the highway enters Bigfork and intersects Secondary Highway 209 (S-209), the "Ferndale cutoff", before crossing the Swan River, one of Flathead Lake's tributaries. On the northern outskirts of Bigfork, MT 35 meets the ends of MT 83 and MT 82 in quick succession, before continuing northwards amidst farmland. After zigzagging to the northwest through the community of Creston, MT 35 reaches Haines Junction, the intersection with S-206, which allows motorists to shortcut to the communities further upstream along the Flathead River. MT 35 heads west from this junction and crosses the Flathead River into Evergreen, and intersects with Helena Flats Road and S-317 just before reaching its northern terminus at US 2 soon afterwards; traffic travelling straight-ahead from this point moves onto US 2 westbound towards Kalispell.

== Major intersections ==
County	Location	mi	km	Destinations	Notes
Lake	Polson	0.00	0.00	US 93 – Kalispell, Missoula	Southern terminus
Flathead	Bigfork	30.650	49.326	S-209 east – Ferndale	
Flathead	Bigfork	33.548	53.990	MT 83 south – Swan Lake, Seeley Lake	
Flathead	Bigfork	33.890	54.541	MT 82 west – Somers	
Flathead		44.985	72.396	S-206 north – Columbia Falls, Glacier National Park	Haines Junction
Flathead	Evergreen	50.293	80.939	S-317 south (Shady Lane)	de facto southeast bypass to US 93
Flathead	Evergreen	50.669	81.544	US 2 – Columbia Falls, Kalispell	Northern terminus
1.000 mi = 1.609 km; 1.000 km = 0.621 mi
