= Somers Beach State Park =

State park in Montana, USA

Coordinates: 48.08213°N 114.21757°W

- Location within Montana
- Nearest city: Somers, Montana
- Area: 106 acres (43 ha)
- Established: 2022
- Visitors: 34,268 (in 2023)
- Governing body: Montana Department of Fish, Wildlife and Parks
- Website: https://fwp.mt.gov/stateparks/somers-beach

Somers Beach State Park is a public recreation area on the northern shore of Flathead Lake in Montana, United States. It is adjacent to the community of Somers.

The park was opened to the public in 2022, and is currently under development for the addition of day-use amenities, cabins, and an erosion control beach.
