= Ronan, Montana =

City in Montana, United States

- City
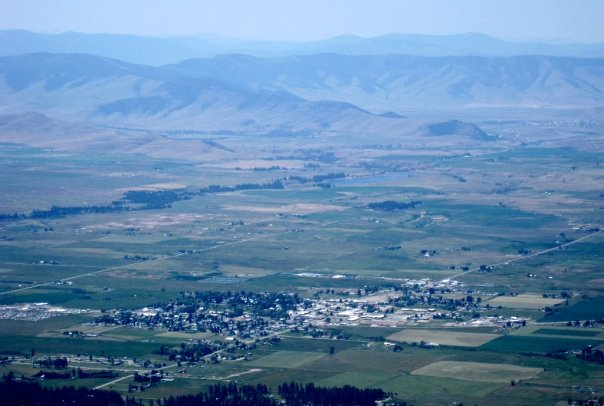
- Ronan as seen from the Mission Mountains in the summer of 2009

- Location of Ronan, Montana
- Coordinates: 47°31′43″N 114°06′03″W
- Country: United States
- State: Montana
- County: Lake

Government
  - Mayor: Chris Adler

Area
  - Total: 1.23 sq mi (3.18 km^{2})
  - Land: 1.23 sq mi (3.18 km^{2})
  - Water: 0 sq mi (0.00 km^{2})
- Elevation: 3,055 ft (931 m)

Population (2020)
  - Total: 1,955
  - Density: 1,590.7/sq mi (614.17/km^{2})
- Time zone: UTC-7 (Mountain (MST))
  - Summer (DST): UTC-6 (MDT)
- ZIP code: 59864
- Area code: 406
- FIPS code: 30-64150
- GNIS feature ID: 2410990
- Website: cityofronan.org

Ronan (Salish: ocqʔetkʷ) is a city in Lake County, Montana, United States. It is on the Flathead Indian Reservation. The population was 1,955 at the 2020 census.

== History ==
The reservation, on which Ronan is located, was created through the July 16, 1855, Hellgate Treaty. It was made between the United States and the Bitterroot Salish, Upper Pend d'Oreille, and Lower Kutenai tribes. The group is now known as the Confederated Salish and Kootenai Tribes.

Originally called Spring Creek, Ronan's name was changed in 1893 in honor of Major Peter Ronan, superintendent of the Flathead Indian Reservation.

== Geography ==
Ronan is approximately 12 miles (19 km) south of Flathead Lake in the northwestern part of the state. The Mission Mountains are to the east. Ninepipe National Wildlife Refuge is about 5 miles (8 km) to the south.

According to the United States Census Bureau, the city has a total area of 1.19 square miles (3.08 km^{2}), all land.

=== Climate ===
This climatic region is typified by large seasonal temperature differences, with warm to hot (and often arid) summers and cold (sometimes severely cold) winters. According to the Köppen Climate Classification system, Ronan has a humid continental climate, abbreviated "DFB" on climate maps.

== Demographics ==
Historical population
Census	Pop.	Note	%±
1920	600		—
1930	537		−10.5%
1940	1,032		92.2%
1950	1,251		21.2%
1960	1,334		6.6%
1970	1,347		1.0%
1980	1,530		13.6%
1990	1,547		1.1%
2000	1,812		17.1%
2010	1,871		3.3%
2020	1,955		4.5%
U.S. Decennial Census

=== 2020 census ===
As of the 2020 census, Ronan had a population of 1,955. The median age was 38.1 years. 24.6% of residents were under the age of 18 and 21.3% of residents were 65 years of age or older. For every 100 females there were 89.6 males, and for every 100 females age 18 and over there were 84.1 males age 18 and over.

0.0% of residents lived in urban areas, while 100.0% lived in rural areas.

There were 794 households in Ronan, of which 32.0% had children under the age of 18 living in them. Of all households, 35.6% were married-couple households, 21.7% were households with a male householder and no spouse or partner present, and 33.6% were households with a female householder and no spouse or partner present. About 35.0% of all households were made up of individuals and 16.6% had someone living alone who was 65 years of age or older.

There were 857 housing units, of which 7.4% were vacant. The homeowner vacancy rate was 2.6% and the rental vacancy rate was 4.5%.

Racial composition as of the 2020 census
Race	Number	Percent
White	1,089	55.7%
Black or African American	3	0.2%
American Indian and Alaska Native	579	29.6%
Asian	22	1.1%
Native Hawaiian and Other Pacific Islander	2	0.1%
Some other race	13	0.7%
Two or more races	247	12.6%
Hispanic or Latino (of any race)	102	5.2%

=== 2010 census ===
As of the census of 2010, there were 1,871 people, 737 households, and 444 families living in the city. The population density was 1,572.3 inhabitants per square mile (607.1/km^{2}). There were 807 housing units at an average density of 678.2 units per square mile (261.9 units/km^{2}). The racial makeup of the city was 61.3% White, 0.4% African American, 27.0% Native American, 0.5% Asian, 0.1% Pacific Islander, 0.6% from other races, and 10.1% from two or more races. Hispanic or Latino of any race were 4.7% of the population.

There were 737 households, of which 33.8% had children under the age of 18 living with them, 35.8% were married couples living together, 19.5% had a female householder with no husband present, 4.9% had a male householder with no wife present, and 39.8% were non-families. 33.2% of all households were made up of individuals, and 13.6% had someone living alone who was 65 years of age or older. The average household size was 2.41 and the average family size was 3.09.

The median age in the city was 34.7 years. 27.7% of residents were under the age of 18; 9.1% were between the ages of 18 and 24; 23.2% were from 25 to 44; 24.1% were from 45 to 64; and 16% were 65 years of age or older. The gender makeup of the city was 46.9% male and 53.1% female.

=== 2000 census ===
As of the census of 2000, there were 1,812 people, 699 households, and 420 families living in the city. The population density was 1,701.5 inhabitants per square mile (657.0/km^{2}). There were 755 housing units at an average density of 709.0 units per square mile (273.7 units/km^{2}). The racial makeup of the city was 62.42% White, 0.11% African American, 33.06% Native American, 0.11% Asian, 0.06% Pacific Islander, 0.44% from other races, and 3.81% from two or more races. Hispanic or Latino of any race were 3.37% of the population.

There were 699 households, out of which 34.3% had children under the age of 18 living with them, 38.6% were married couples living together, 15.6% had a female householder with no husband present, and 39.9% were non-families. 33.8% of all households were made up of individuals, and 15.7% had someone living alone who was 65 years of age or older. The average household size was 2.47 and the average family size was 3.18.

In the city, the population was spread out, with 29.2% under the age of 18, 9.8% from 18 to 24, 23.5% from 25 to 44, 20.8% from 45 to 64, and 16.8% who were 65 years of age or older. The median age was 35 years. For every 100 females there were 84.0 males. For every 100 females age 18 and over, there were 75.5 males.

The median income for a household in the city was $22,422, and the median income for a family was $29,750. Males had a median income of $27,847 versus $17,454 for females. The per capita income for the city was $11,678. About 20.0% of families and 24.8% of the population were below the poverty line, including 26.7% of those under age 18 and 21.8% of those age 65 or over.

== Government ==
Ronan has a mayor and city council. The council has three wards, each with two councilors. Chris A. Adler served as mayor from 2022 to 2025. He did not run for re-election. Ryan L. Corum was elected in November 2025 to the four-year term.

== Education ==
Public education in Ronan is provided by Ronan School District, which has four schools, three of them in Ronan:

- Ronan High School
- Ronan Middle School
- K. William Harvey Elementary School

For the 2021–2022 school year, 371 students were enrolled in the high school. The team name is Chiefs for male athletes and Maidens for female athletes.

Ronan City Library is the public library.

== Media ==
The Char-Koosta News is the newspaper serving the Flathead Indian Reservation. The Valley Journal provides local news to Arlee, Charlo, Pablo, Polson, Ronan, and St. Ignatius.

The FM radio station KKMT is licensed in Ronan. It airs a Top 40 format.

== Transportation ==
The main highway route to Ronan is U.S. Route 93. The closest Interstate is I-90, which is 46 miles (74 km) south on US 93. The daily Amtrak passenger service the Empire Builder runs between Seattle/Portland and Chicago. Nearby depots are in Whitefish (76 miles (122 km) north) and West Glacier.

Ronan Airport is a public use airport located 3 miles north of town. The nearest commercial airports are Missoula Montana Airport, 50 miles (80 km) south, and Glacier Park International Airport, in Kalispell 68 miles (109 km) north.

== Notable people ==
- Lou Goodale Bigelow, photographer
- Marvin Camel, professional boxer
- Corwin Clairmont, artist, activist and educator
- Rick Jore, member of the Montana House of Representatives
- Laverne Parrish, WWII Medal of Honor recipient
- Daniel Salomon, member of the Montana House of Representatives; born and resides in Ronan
- Shiyazh Pete, 1st Navajo to sign with an NFL team
