= Lou Goodale Bigelow =

American photographer

- Born: Lou Adelaide Bigelow; November 24, 1884; St. Joseph, Missouri, U.S.
- Died: July 31, 1968 (aged 83); San Diego, California, U.S.
- Known for: Photography

Lou Goodale Bigelow (November 24, 1884 – July 31, 1968) was an early 20th century American photographer.

Born to photographer Lyman Goodale Bigelow and his photographic assistant and wife Ada in St. Joseph, Missouri, Lou Adelaide Goodale Bigelow grew up in Ronan, Montana. She learned the art of photography from her father, Lyman Goodale Bigelow, and worked in Kalispell, Montana as an assistant to Roland W. Reed, a photographer of Native Americans who produced striking images of members of the Blackfoot nation.

She accompanied Reed to California in early 1915, where he set up a studio in Coronado and showed photographs in the 1915 Panama–Pacific International Exposition; Bigelow purchased the studio from Reed in November of that year when he returned to Kalispell.

She later set up her own studio in San Diego, California. Over a career of more than 30 years, she specialized in commercial portraits of guests staying at the Hotel del Coronado. Her portraits were frequently published in the San Diego Union newspaper; among her clients was Wallis Simpson, later the Duchess of Windsor. Notable subjects included stage celebrities. In later life, Bigelow painted portraits and landscapes.

Bigelow was the subject of a 2000 exhibition "Lou Goodale Bigelow: An early Twentieth-Century Female Photographer and Artist" at the Coronado Museum of History and Art.
