= National Bison Range Complex =

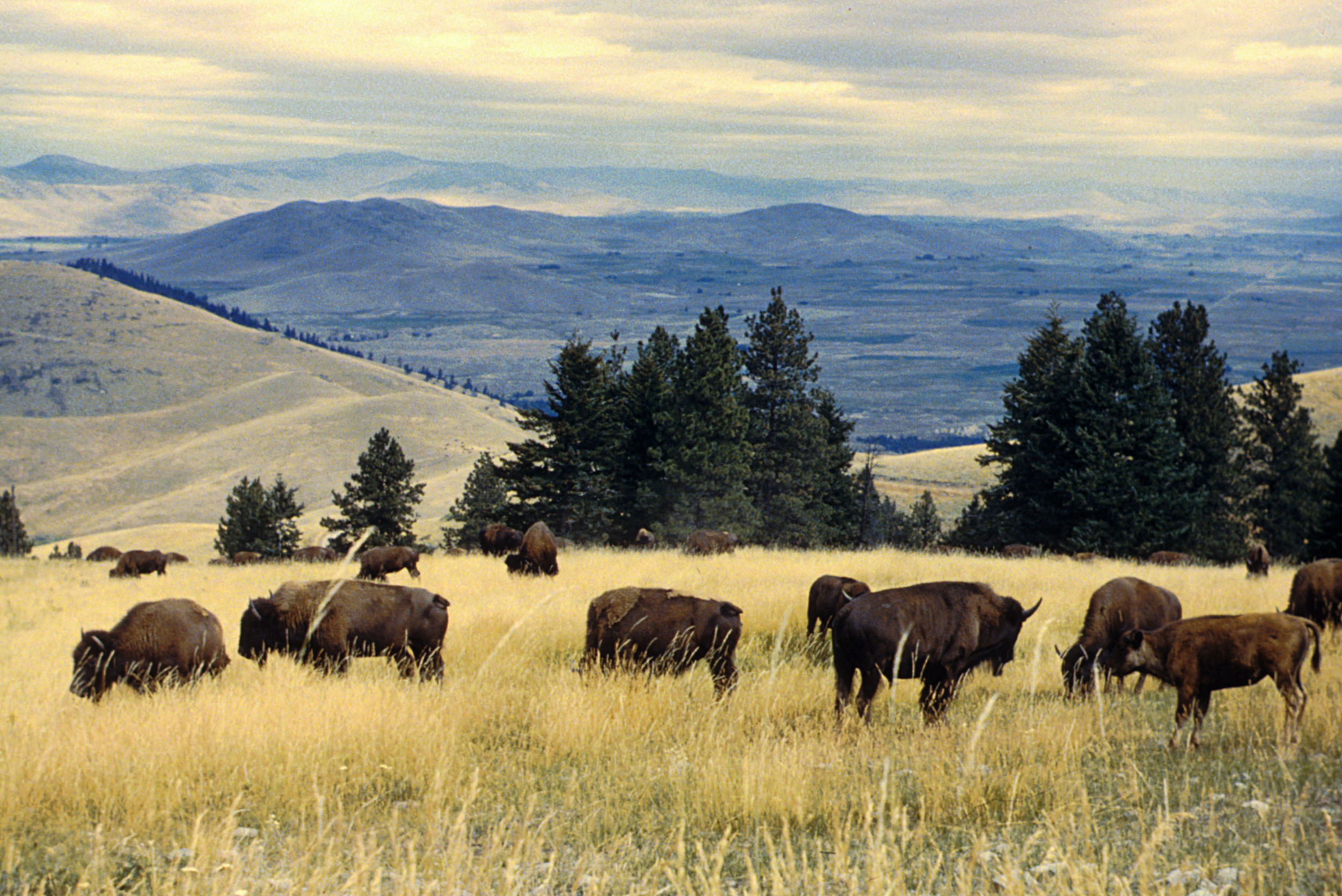
Bison herd grazing at the National Bison Range

The National Bison Range Complex includes four National Wildlife Refuges and the Northwest Montana Wetland Management District, and is located in the northwestern region of Montana in the northwestern United States.

== Administration ==
All of the refuges and associated lands are managed from headquarters at the National Bison Range by the US Fish and Wildlife Service, an agency under the US Department of the Interior. The National Bison Range is located near Moiese, off U.S. Highway 93, and north of Missoula.

== Geography ==
The different units are scattered throughout the Flathead Valley, Mission Valley, and Pleasant Valley. They include habitats of open water and open grasslands, cliff tops and tree tops, pine groves, and quaking aspen groves. Bison herds are protected and supported within them.

=== Protected areas ===
Refuges

- Lost Trail National Wildlife Refuge
- Ninepipe National Wildlife Refuge
- Pablo National Wildlife Refuge
- Swan River National Wildlife Refuge

Wetlands management

- Northwest Montana Wetland Management District

Administration:

- National Bison Range

The Ninepipe, Swan River, and Pablo National Wildlife Refuges are not permanently staffed. However, the Lost Trail Refuge and National Bison Range both have interpretive visitor centers and naturalists.

== See also ==
- Bison herds
- National Wildlife Refuges in Montana
