= Swan River National Wildlife Refuge =

Protected area in Montana, United States

- IUCN category IV (habitat/species management area)
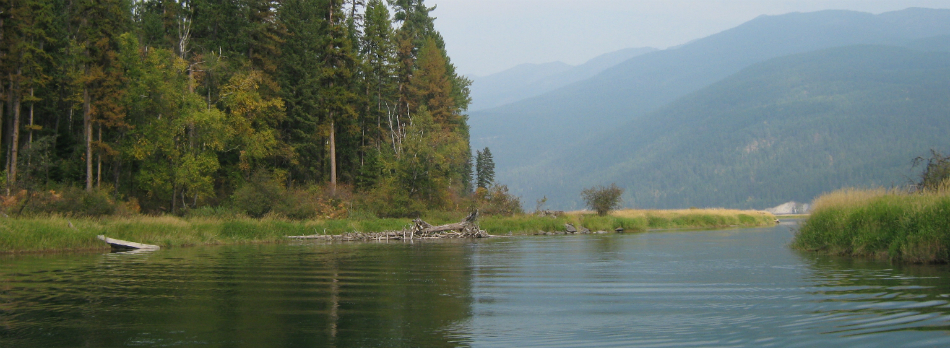

- Location within the United States
- Location: Lake County, Montana, United States
- Nearest city: Kalispell, MT
- Coordinates: 47°54′26″N 113°51′33″W
- Area: 1,568 acres (6.35 km^{2})
- Established: 1973
- Governing body: U.S. Fish and Wildlife Service
- Website: Swan River National Wildlife Refuge

Swan River National Wildlife Refuge is a 1,778-acre (720 ha) National Wildlife Refuge in Lake County of northwestern Montana. It is a unit of the National Bison Range Complex.

== Description ==
The refuge was primarily set aside to protect prime habitat for various species of birds and particularly waterfowl. The refuge consists of a wide floodplain of the Swan River, though the river has relocated to the western sections of the refuge due to silt buildup.

171 bird species have been observed at the refuge, including teals, great blue heron and a pair of nesting bald eagles, the last of which may be due to the abundance of fish in the Swan River. Numerous mammals such as the white-tailed deer, elk, moose, black bear, coyote, bobcat and beaver can all be found here. The grizzly bear may occasionally wander in from surrounding mountains.

== See also ==
- Bison herds
- National Wildlife Refuges in Montana
