= Jewel Basin =

Area of the Flathead National Forest, Montana, US

Coordinates: 48°10′13″N 113°55′27″W

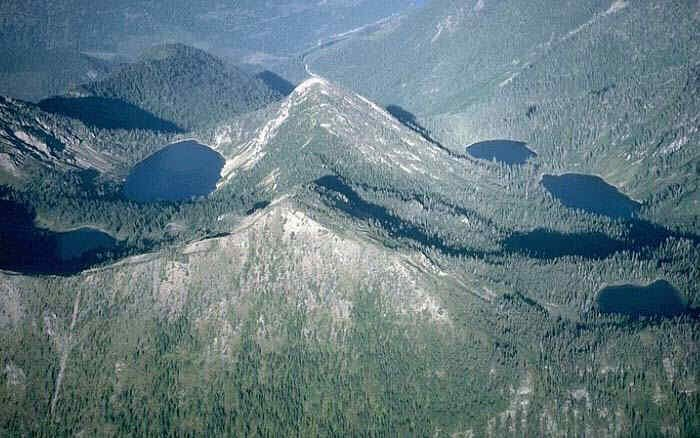

Jewel Basin is an area of the Flathead National Forest, Montana, United States, known for its hiking. The Basin is located east of Kalispell, Montana and west of the Hungry Horse Reservoir at the north end of the Swan Range. The Basin is 15,349 acres (62.1 km²) including 27 lakes and 35 miles (56 km) of trails. The Basin is specially designated for hiking only, with motorized vehicles and horses prohibited.

The main parking area is reached by following Montana Highway 83 to the Echo Lake Road and further up to the Jewel Basin Road (Forest Service Road No. 5392).
