= Swan Lake (Montana) =

Lake in Lake County, Montana, United States

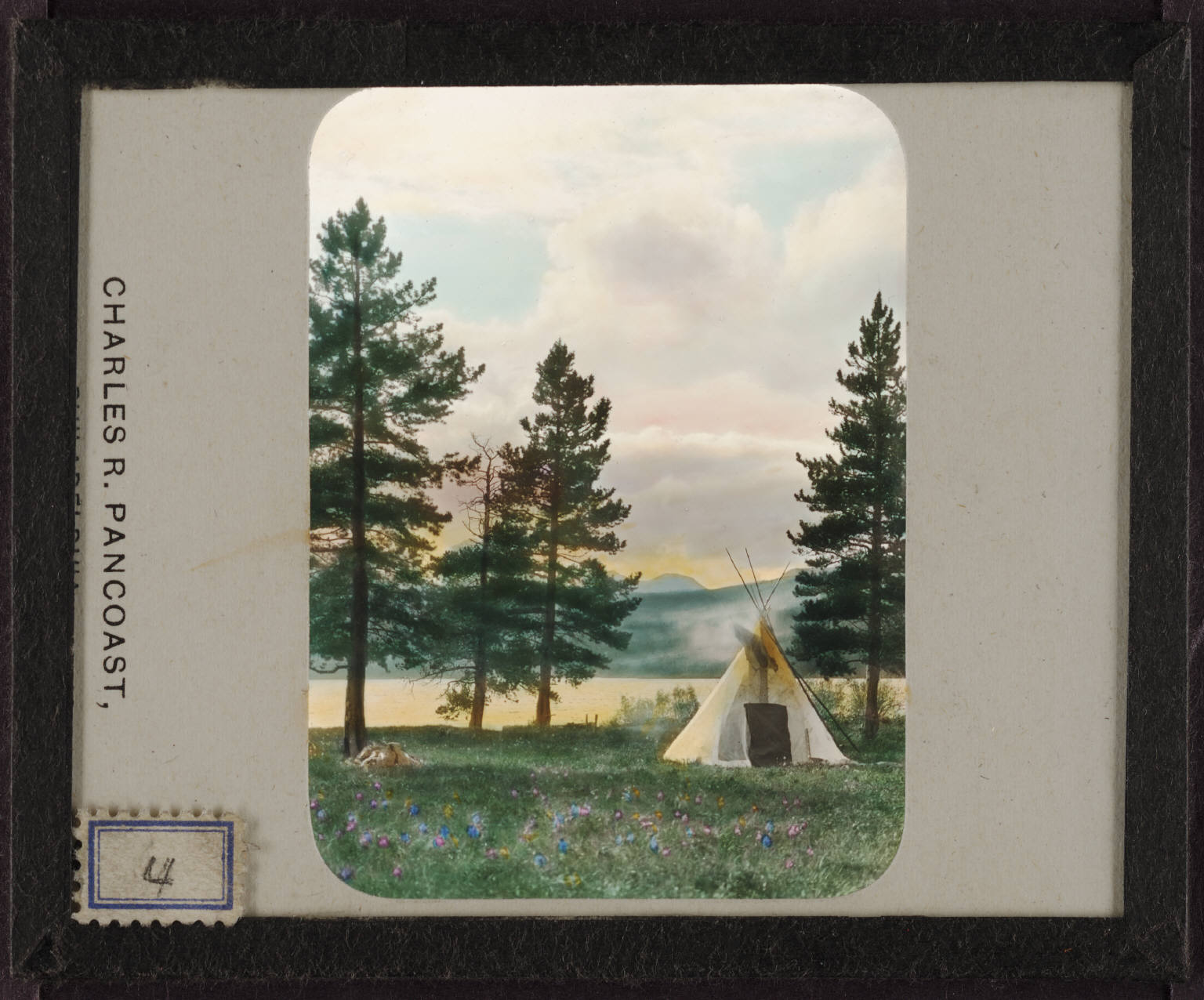
- Tipi camped on Swan Lake

- Location within Montana Location within the United States
- Location: Lake County, Montana, United States
- Coordinates: 47°57′32″N 113°53′41″W
- Lake type: Glacial creation
- Primary inflows: Swan River
- Basin countries: United States
- Max. length: 10 mi (16 km)
- Max. width: 1 mi (1.6 km)
- Surface area: 3,269 acres (1,323 ha)
- Average depth: 52 ft (16 m)
- Max. depth: 133 ft (41 m)
- Surface elevation: 3,071 ft (936 m)
- Settlements: Swan Lake

Swan Lake is a lake located east of Flathead Lake and the town of Bigfork, Montana. The Swan River comes from the south and fills the lake. The lake is similar to Moyie Lake in southern British Columbia. It is a narrow, small, and twisty lake that is hard to navigate. There is a small divide that separates the Swan River Valley from the Clearwater River Valley. The Clearwater River flows south through a series of lakes, including Seeley Lake and empties into the Blackfoot River. The two valleys are known locally as the Seeley/Swan. Swan Lake runs parallel to Montana Highway 83.

The Swan Lake Area is host to numerous campsites including areas right along the lake. Swan Lake is also home to many lakeside homes.
