= Burke Riley =

American politician

- Burke Riley as Secretary

Secretary of Alaska Territory
- In office 1952 – April 10, 1953
- Preceded by: Joseph W. Kehoe
- Succeeded by: Waino Hendrickson

Member of the Alaska Territorial House of Representatives
- In office 1954–1958

Personal details
- Born: Edmund Burke Riley Jr. April 2, 1914 Swan Lake, Montana
- Died: June 13, 2006 (aged 92) Kirkland, Washington
- Party: Democratic
- Relations: E.L. Bob Bartlett (father in-law)
- Occupation: Lawyer

Edmund Burke Riley Jr. (April 2, 1914 – June 13, 2006) was an American Democratic legislator, lawyer and public official on territorial, state and national levels. He served as the Secretary of Alaska Territory from 1952-1953 under Governor Ernest Gruening. He was a signer of the Alaska Constitution, elected as one of seven at-large delegates from the First Division.

Riley was born in Swan Lake, Montana and grew up in Yakima, Washington. He graduated from Yakima Valley Community College and attended the University of Washington, but he ran out of money in 1937 and moved to Fairbanks, Alaska the following year. While in Fairbanks, he worked as a clerk in the Caterpillar department of Northern Commercial Company, serving the miners who worked the mining districts north of Fairbanks. One of these miners, Bob Bartlett, would later become his father-in-law. During World War II, he served in the United States Army Air Forces as a courier in the Pacific Theater of Operations.

After leaving the armed forces, Riley returned to Alaska, moving to Juneau. He passed the Alaska Territory's bar examination, and was later appointed assistant to territorial Governor Ernest Gruening. Later in the Gruening administration, Riley became the Secretary of Alaska (which evolved into the present-day position of Lieutenant Governor of Alaska) from 1952 to 1953. This position, like that of the territorial governor, was appointed by the President of the United States. His term was cut short with the change of command from Harry S. Truman to Dwight D. Eisenhower, and he was succeeded as Secretary by Republican Waino Hendrickson.

In 1954, Riley was elected to the Alaska Territorial House of Representatives, serving two terms. He was one of a handful of sitting legislators who were elected as delegates to Alaska's Constitutional Convention. In the latter position, he served as the Chair of the Committee on Rules, and a member of the Committee on Resources. After statehood in 1959, he was the executive assistant to the state's first governor, William A. Egan. Riley later worked in the United States Bureau of Land Management and the Department of the Interior.

Riley died in a Kirkland, Washington hospice after developing Alzheimer's disease, aged 92.
