= Ninepipe National Wildlife Refuge =

Protected area in Montana, United States

- IUCN category IV (habitat/species management area)
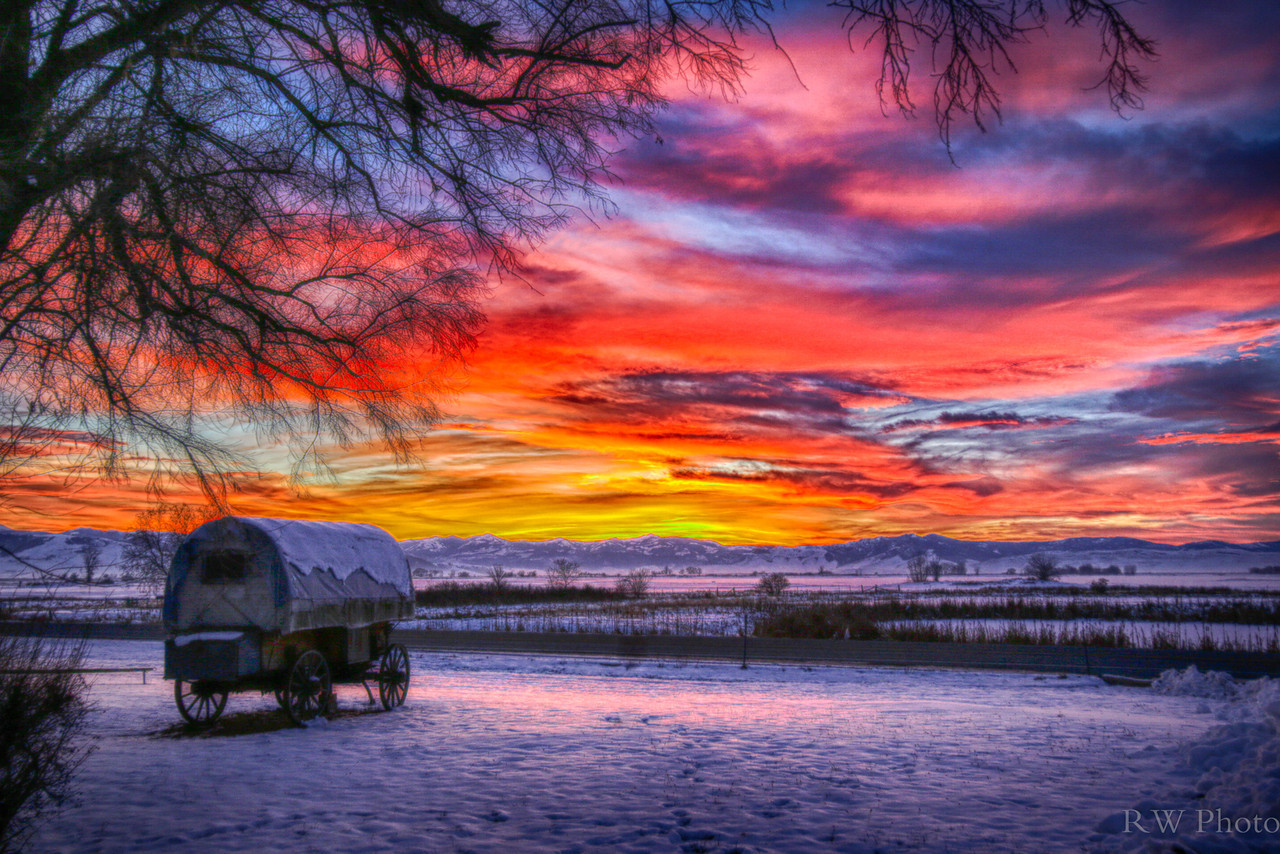
- Covered wagon at sunset

- Location within the United States
- Location: Lake County, Montana, USA
- Nearest city: Ronan, MT
- Coordinates: 47°26′28″N 114°07′16″W
- Area: 4,027 acres (16.30 km^{2})
- Established: 1921
- Governing body: U.S. Fish and Wildlife Service
- Website: Ninepipe National Wildlife Refuge

Ninepipe National Wildlife Refuge is a 4,027-acre (1,630 ha) National Wildlife Refuge and unit of the National Bison Range Complex, located in Lake County, Montana.

It was established in 1921, and is within the Flathead Indian Reservation (known as the Tribal Trust Lands of the Confederated Salish and Kootenai Tribes) 5 mi (8.0 km) south of Ronan, Montana, United States.

== Description ==
Most of the Ninepipe National Wildlife Refuge is a reservoir so the exposed land area is only 390 acres (160 ha) in a narrow band around the reservoir. Ninepipe is managed by the U.S. Fish and Wildlife Service, an agency under the U.S. Department of the Interior.

Ninepipe is a prime nesting habitat for numerous bird species such as the grebe, Canada goose, bittern, great blue heron and various species of ducks. Nesting platforms for ospreys at one end of the lake provide added habitat for this predatory species. Mammals include muskrat, badger and porcupine live within the refuge, and grizzly bears have been known to venture out of the Mission Range mountains onto the refuge.

The refuge is located right off of U.S. Highway 93. The refuge is not permanently staffed and has no improvements. It is managed as an easement and the federal jurisdiction pertains solely to species and habitat protection. As a part of the National Bison Range Complex, this refuge is managed from the headquarters of the National Bison Range.

== See also ==
- Bison herds
- National Wildlife Refuges in Montana
