= Flathead River =

River in Montana, United States

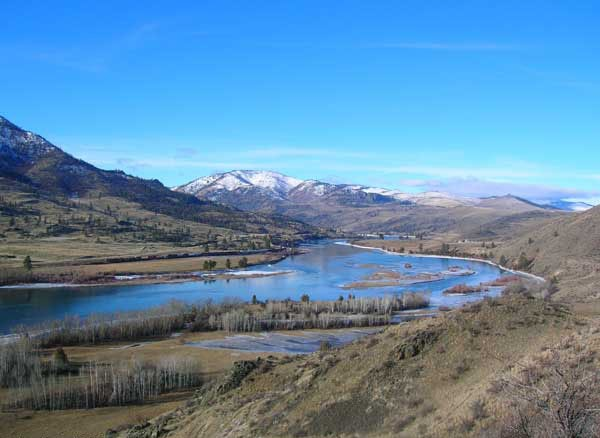
- The river near Perma, Montana

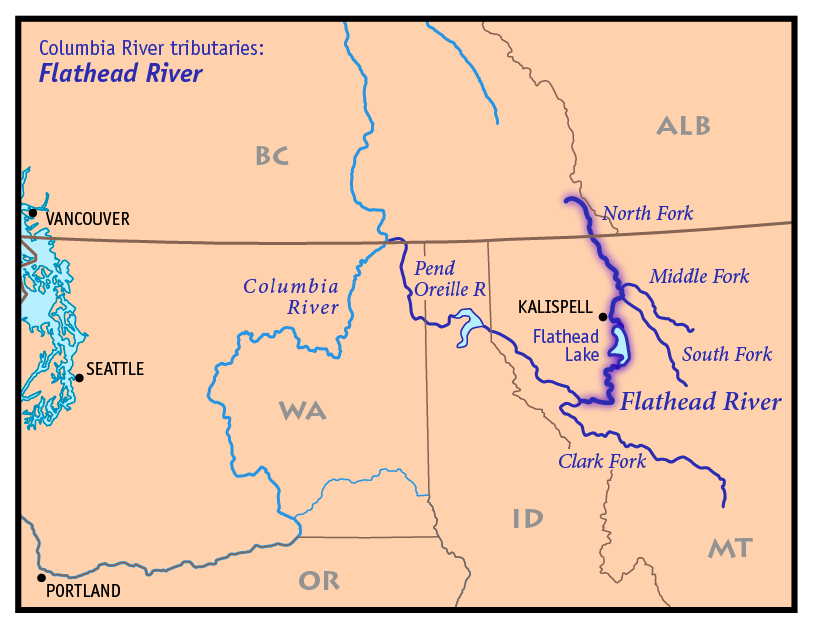
- Map of the Flathead River, its tributary forks and downriver connection to the Columbia River via Clark Fork and the Pend Oreille River
- Native name: ntx̣ʷetkʷ (Kalispel-Pend d'Oreille); ntx̣ʷe (Kalispel-Pend d'Oreille)

Location
- Country: United States, Canada
- State: Montana
- Province: British Columbia

Physical characteristics
- Source: Confluence of North Fork and Middle Fork Flathead River
  - location: Rocky Mountains
  - coordinates: 48°28′2″N 114°4′10″W
  - elevation: 3,120 ft (950 m)
- Mouth: Clark Fork
  - location: Montana
  - coordinates: 47°21′56″N 114°46′34″W
  - elevation: 2,484 ft (757 m)
- Length: 158 mi (254 km)
- Basin size: 8,795 sq mi (22,780 km^{2})
- Discharge
  - location: near mouth, at Perma, MT; max at Polson, MT
  - average: 11,380 cu ft/s (322 m^{3}/s)
  - minimum: 2,670 cu ft/s (76 m^{3}/s)
  - maximum: 110,000 cu ft/s (3,100 m^{3}/s)

Basin features
- Tributaries
  - left: Middle Fork Flathead River, South Fork Flathead River, Swan River (Montana)
  - right: Stillwater River, North Fork Flathead River

National Wild and Scenic River
- Type: Wild 97.9 miles (157.6 km); Scenic 40.7 miles (65.5 km); Recreational 80.4 miles (129.4 km)
- Designated: October 12, 1976

The Flathead River (Salish: člq̓etkʷ ntx̣ʷetkʷ, ntx̣ʷe, Ktunaxa: kananmituk), in the northwestern part of the U.S. state of Montana, originates in the Canadian Rockies to the north of Glacier National Park and flows southwest into Flathead Lake, then after a journey of 158 miles (254 km), empties into the Clark Fork. The river is part of the Columbia River drainage basin, as the Clark Fork is a tributary of the Pend Oreille River, a Columbia River tributary. With a drainage basin extending over 8,795 square miles (22,780 km^{2}) and an average discharge of 11,380 cubic feet per second (322 m^{3}/s), the Flathead is the largest tributary of the Clark Fork and constitutes over half of its flow.

== Course ==
The Flathead River rises in forks in the Rocky Mountains of northwestern Montana. The largest tributary is the North Fork, which runs from the Canadian province of British Columbia southwards. The North Fork is sometimes considered the main stem of the Flathead River. Near West Glacier the North Fork combines with the Middle Fork to form the main Flathead River. The river then flows westwards to join the South Fork and cuts between the Whitefish Range and Swan Range via Bad Rock Canyon. All of the headwaters forks are entirely or in part designated National Wild and Scenic Rivers. After the river leaves the canyon it flows into the broad Flathead Valley and arcs southwest, passing Columbia Falls and Kalispell, before it is joined by the Stillwater River and its Whitefish River tributary, and then empties into Flathead Lake, where the Swan River joins.

Near Polson the river leaves the natural basin of Flathead Lake, but first passes through Seli’š Ksanka Qlispe’ Dam (formerly Kerr Dam), which raised Flathead Lake's natural level by 10 feet (3.0 m). After flowing through the dam the river turns south and meanders through the Flathead Valley west of the Mission Mountains, and at Sčilíp it is joined by the small Jocko River. At the Jocko River confluence it turns west, and a few miles after flows into the Clark Fork near Paradise.

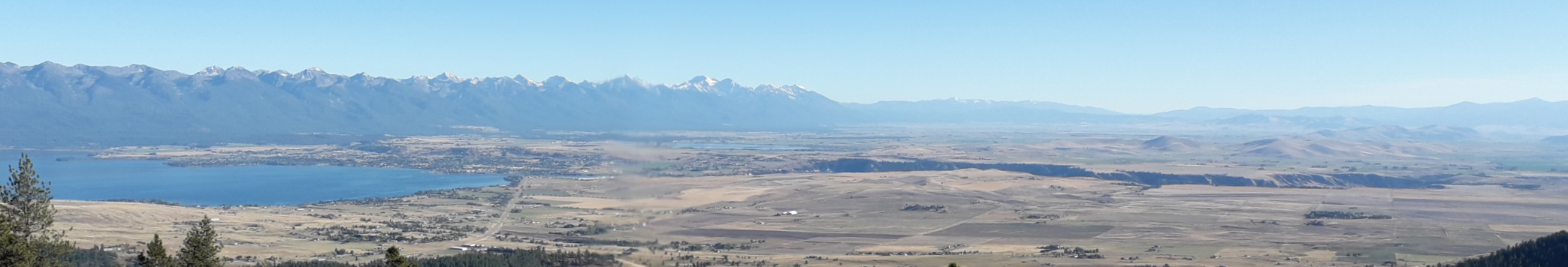
The Flathead River leaves the natural basin of Flathead Lake near Polson.

== History ==
David Thompson (explorer) explored the area in 1807. Fur traders employed by the North West Company and Hudson's Bay Company entered the Flathead Valley in the early 19th century. Trading posts were established north of Flathead Lake. The 1846 settlement of the Oregon Boundary Dispute established the border with British North America and that the Flathead Valley was firmly American. The first settlers began arriving in the 1860s. Irrigation agriculture began in the 1880s.

The river was affected by the 2022 Montana floods.

== Recreation ==
The river is a Class I river in Montana for purposes of recreational access. The South Fork of the Flathead, from Youngs Creek to Hungry Horse reservoir; Middle Fork of the Flathead – from Schaffer Creek to its confluence with the Flathead River; and the Flathead River – to its confluence with the Clark Fork River, are designated.

== Conservation ==
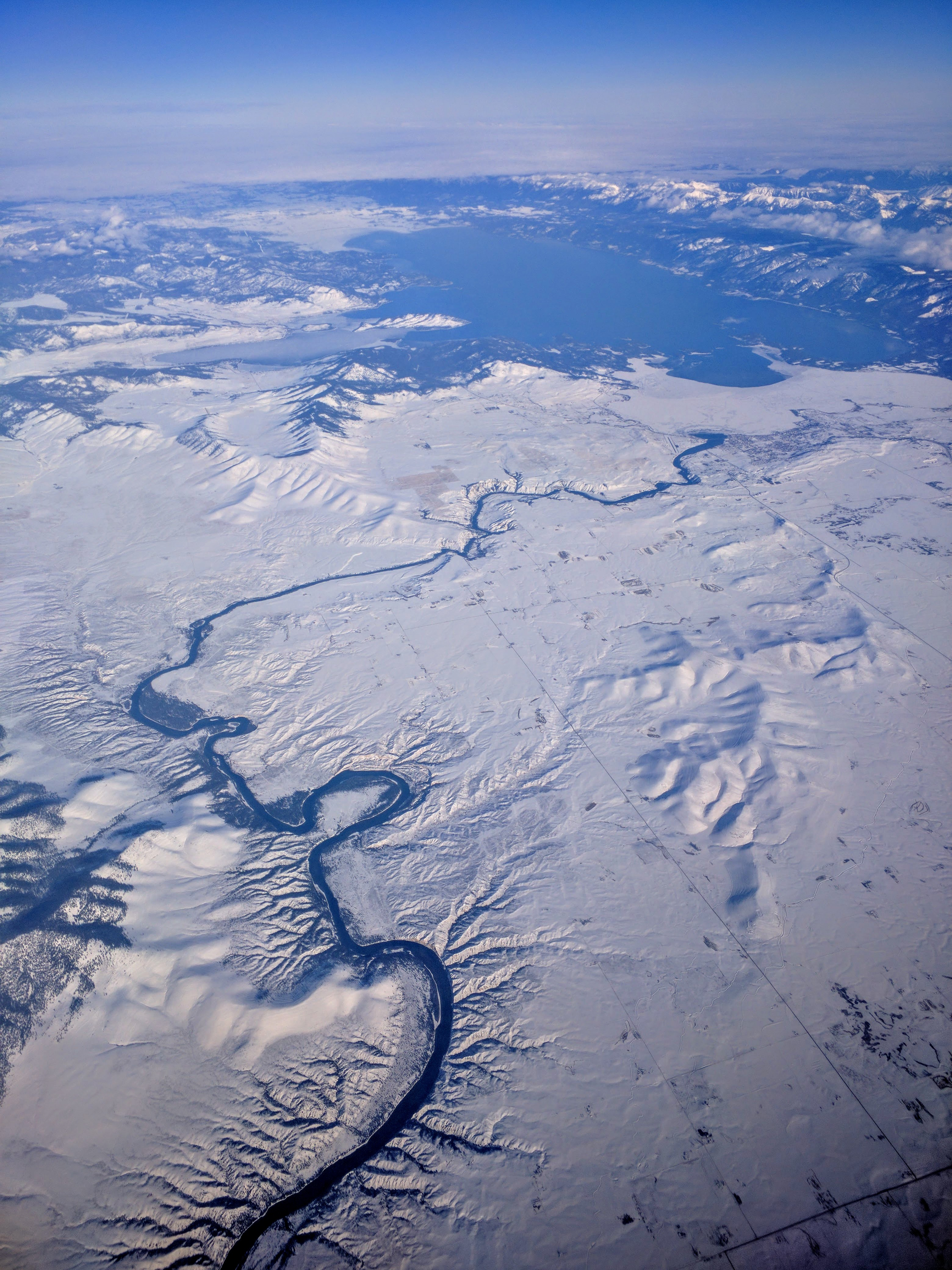
Winter aerial view of the Flathead River below Kerr Dam (below Flathead Lake)

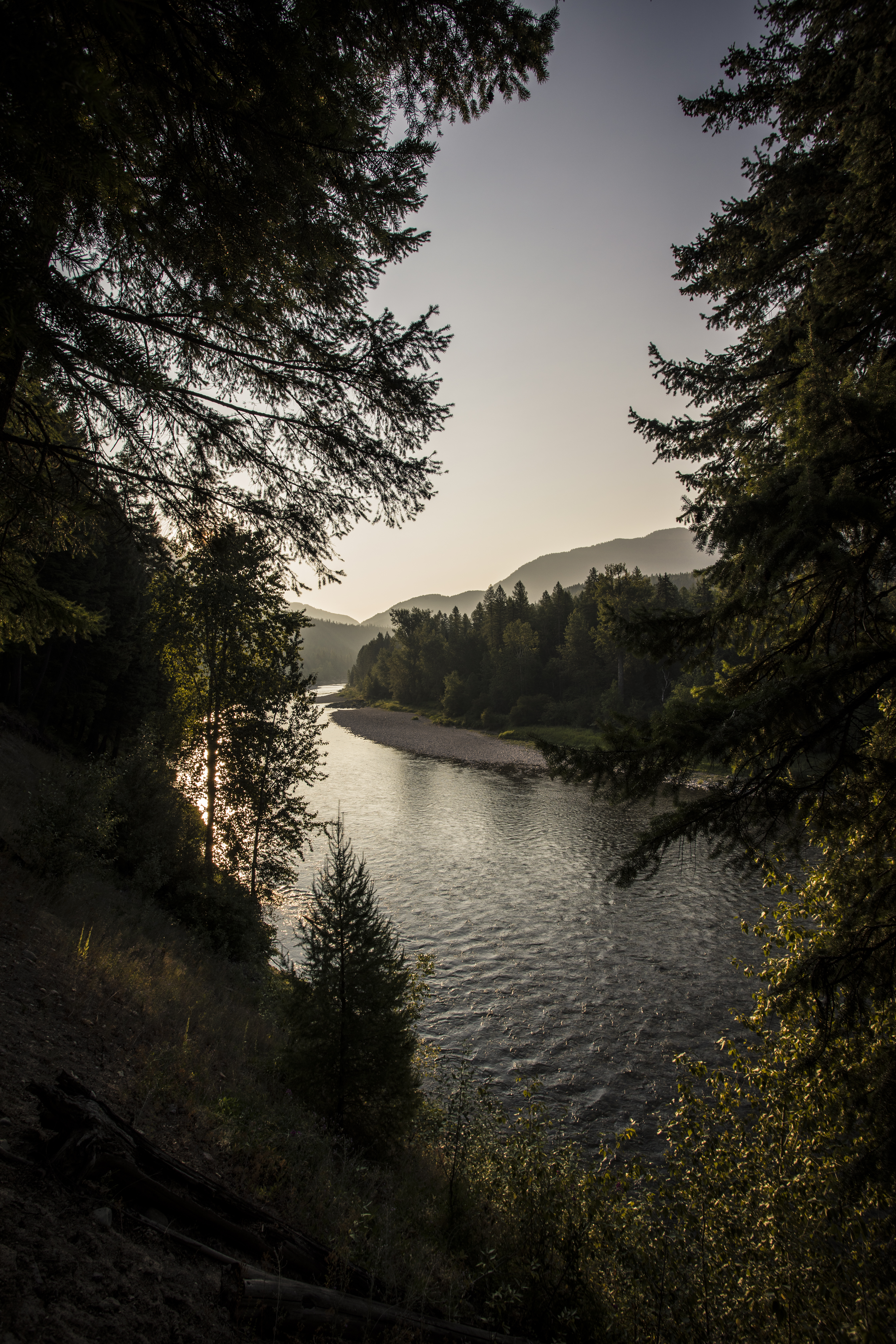
The Middle Fork of the Flathead River near West Glacier.

It is part of the National Wild and Scenic Rivers System. Reaches designated wild and scenic include the entire North Fork south of the Canada–US border, the entire Middle Fork, and the South Fork above Hungry Horse Reservoir.

The North Fork Flathead River in Montana is designated a National Wild and Scenic River. The river is not afforded any protection in British Columbia. This has been the subject of 33 years of dispute between the United States and Canada. In 1988 the International Joint Commission, ruled that a proposed open pit coal mine would violate the 1909 Boundary Waters Treaty.

Energy development once threatened the North Fork, which was deemed the "wildest river in the continental United States" by The New York Times in 2004. On February 21, 2008, BP announced to drop plans to obtain drilling rights for coalbed methane extraction in the river's headwaters. The Cline Mining Corporation still intended to start a mountaintop-removal coal mining project.

On February 9, 2010, the British Columbia government announced that it would not permit mining, oil and gas development and coalbed gas extraction in British Columbia's portion of the Flathead Valley, which was praised by environmental groups and the U.S. Senators from Montana.

There is a proposal to protect one-third of British Columbia's Flathead River by adding it to the Waterton-Glacier International Peace Park. In 2003 Parks Canada requested the province of British Columbia to take part in a park feasibility study. British Columbia has yet to agree to this.

== List Of Crossings ==
- Co Rd 382
- Sloan's bridge (source 47°29'43.1"N 114°19'09.1"W)
- Buffalo Bridge Rd (source 47°38'55.5"N 114°20'45.8"W)
- U.S. Route 93 in Montana (source 47°41'43.9"N 114°10'12.9"W)
- Montana Highway 82 (source 48°05'32.8"N 114°06'55.0"W)
- Kiwanis Ln (source 48°12'37.4"N 114°15'27.7"W)
- Montana Highway 35(source 48°13'17.5"N 114°14'32.7"W)
- U.S. Route 2 in Montana(source 48°21'57.2"N 114°10'08.9"W)

== See also ==
- List of rivers of Montana
- List of rivers of British Columbia
- Montana Stream Access Law
- Montana Wilderness Association
- Tributaries of the Columbia River
