= Elmo, Montana =

Elmo, Montana sqʷʔeʔ k̓upawi¢q̓nuk
- Census-designated place
- Location of Elmo, Montana
- Coordinates: 47°49′44″N 114°20′54″W
- Country: United States
- State: Montana
- County: Lake

Area
  - Total: 0.32 sq mi (0.82 km^{2})
  - Land: 0.32 sq mi (0.82 km^{2})
  - Water: 0 sq mi (0.00 km^{2})
- Elevation: 2,910 ft (890 m)

Population (2020)
  - Total: 244
  - Density: 770.3/sq mi (297.41/km^{2})
- Time zone: UTC-7 (Mountain (MST))
  - Summer (DST): UTC-6 (MDT)
- ZIP code: 59915
- Area code: 406
- FIPS code: 30-24100
- GNIS feature ID: 2408079

Elmo (Salish: sqʷʔeʔ, Kutenai: k̓upawi¢q̓nuk) is a census-designated place (CDP) in Lake County, Montana, United States. As of the 2020 census, Elmo had a population of 244.

The townsite was platted in 1917. Elmo had a dock and warehouse that served boat traffic on Flathead Lake.

== Geography ==
Elmo is located in northwestern Lake County at the west end of the Big Arm on Flathead Lake. U.S. Route 93 passes through the community, leading north 35 miles (56 km) to Kalispell and southeast 16 miles (26 km) to Polson, the Lake county seat. Montana Highway 28 has its eastern terminus at US 93 in Elmo and leads southwest 46 miles (74 km) to Montana Highway 200 at Plains.

According to the United States Census Bureau, the Elmo CDP has a total area of 0.3 square miles (0.78 km^{2}), all land.

=== Climate ===
This climatic region is typified by large seasonal temperature differences, with warm to hot (and often humid) summers and cold (sometimes severely cold) winters. According to the Köppen Climate Classification system, Elmo has a humid continental climate, abbreviated "Dfb" on climate maps.

== Demographics ==
Historical population
Census	Pop.	Note	%±
2020	244		—
U.S. Decennial Census

As of the census of 2000, there were 143 people, 52 households, and 31 families residing in the CDP. The population density was 439.9 inhabitants per square mile (169.8/km^{2}). There were 62 housing units at an average density of 190.7 per square mile (73.6/km^{2}). The racial makeup of the CDP was 31.47% White, 67.83% Native American, and 0.70% from two or more races. Hispanic or Latino of any race were 2.10% of the population.

There were 52 households, out of which 36.5% had children under the age of 18 living with them, 36.5% were married couples living together, 19.2% had a female householder with no husband present, and 38.5% were non-families. 25.0% of all households were made up of individuals, and 9.6% had someone living alone who was 65 years of age or older. The average household size was 2.75 and the average family size was 3.56.

In the CDP, the population was spread out, with 30.8% under the age of 18, 7.7% from 18 to 24, 25.2% from 25 to 44, 23.1% from 45 to 64, and 13.3% who were 65 years of age or older. The median age was 33 years. For every 100 females, there were 76.5 males. For every 100 females age 18 and over, there were 83.3 males.

The median income for a household in the CDP was $8,036, and the median income for a family was $8,250. Males had a median income of $0 versus $3,750 for females. The per capita income for the CDP was $2,778. There were 100.0% of families and 96.1% of the population living below the poverty line, including 100.0% of under 18 and 45.5% of those over 64.

== See also ==
- List of census-designated places in Montana
