= Montana Highway 83 =

State highway in Montana, United States

Montana Highway 83
- MT 83 highlighted in red

Route information
- Maintained by MDT
- Length: 91.118 mi (146.640 km)
- Existed: 1934–present

Major junctions
- South end: MT 200 at Clearwater Junction
- S-209
- North end: MT 35 north of Bigfork

Location
- Country: United States
- State: Montana
- Counties: Flathead, Lake, Missoula

Highway system
- Montana Highway System; Interstate; US; State; Secondary
← MT 82	→ MT 84

Montana Highway 83 (MT 83) is a 91.118-mile-long (146.640 km) north–south state highway in Flathead, Lake, and Missoula counties in Montana, United States, that connects Montana Highway 200 (MT 200) in Clearwater (east of Missoula) with Montana Highway 35 (MT 35) on north edge of Bigfork.

== Route description ==
MT 83 starts at the intersection with MT 200 at Clearwater Junction, about 40 miles (64 km) east of Missoula, and runs north-northwesterly, mostly through broad, forested valleys and along scenic lakeshores within the Lolo National Forest, Flathead National Forest and Swan River State Forest, before curving west to its northern terminus at MT 35 about 3 miles (4.8 km) north of Bigfork. The region is sparsely settled, with small communities economically dependent on a mixture of logging and tourism. The largest communities along the route are Seeley Lake, Condon and Swan Lake.

MT 83 passes through mostly forest landscape, and wildlife crossings should be expected at all times. Elk herds crossing near Clearwater Junction can be hard to see at night.

== History ==
Most of today's MT 83 has existed since at least 1934, originally designated as part of MT 31 as depicted on the 1935 state map.

From 1960 until 1977, the southerly 84 miles (135 km) of MT 83 were a part of Secondary Highway 209 (S-209), and the northernmost 7 miles (11 km) were designated as S-326.

Since 1978, a small segment of S-209 survives under its original designation, between Bigfork and a junction with the current MT 83 near Ferndale. (The S-326 designation was later reused on an unrelated highway in southeastern Carter County, Montana.)

== Major intersections ==
County	Location	mi	km	Destinations	Notes
Missoula	Clearwater Junction	0.000	0.000	MT 200 – Missoula, Great Falls	Southern terminus of MT 83; roadway continues into the rest area
Lake	No major junctions				
Flathead		82.655	133.020	S-209 west – Bigfork	
Flathead	Bigfork	91.118	146.640	MT 35 – Kalispell, Polson	Northern terminus of MT 83
1.000 mi = 1.609 km; 1.000 km = 0.621 mi

== See also ==
- List of state highways in Montana
