= Montana Highway 82 =

State highway in Montana, United States

Montana Highway 82
- MT 82 highlighted in red

Route information
- Maintained by MDT
- Length: 6.862 mi (11.043 km)
- Existed: 1942–present

Major junctions
- West end: US 93 north of Somers
- East end: MT 35 north of Bigfork

Location
- Country: United States
- State: Montana
- Counties: Flathead

Highway system
- Montana Highway System; Interstate; US; State; Secondary
| ← MT 81 | → MT 83 |

Montana Highway 82 (MT 82) is a state highway in the U.S. state of Montana connecting U.S. Highway 93 (US 93) north of Somers to MT 35 north of Bigfork.

== Route description ==
MT 82 begins at the intersection with US 93 north of Somers. It proceeds east across mostly flat rural terrain before curving south and east, crossing the Flathead River and climbing a forested hill up to its eastern terminus at MT 35, just north of MT 83 and about three miles (4.8 km) north of Bigfork.

MT 82 passes through rural and forest landscape, and wildlife crossings should be expected at all times.

== History ==
A road connecting US 93 in Somers and MT 35 has existed since at least the early 1930s, and can be seen on the 1935 state map.

The original routing followed Somers Road through the community. The current alignment north of Somers was completed in 1952.

MT 82 was originally designated as Secondary Highway 208 (S-208), and was among the first of the new secondary routes established in 1942. It was not formally signed until 1960, and was signed until 1978, when it received its current MT 82 designation. The S-208 designation was later reused on an unrelated highway in northern Phillips County, Montana.

== Major junctions ==
The entire highway is in Flathead County.

| Location | mi | km | Destinations | Notes |
|---|---|---|---|---|
| Somers | 0.000 | 0.000 | US 93 – Kalispell, Polson | |
| Bigfork | 6.862 | 11.043 | MT 35 | |
1.000 mi = 1.609 km; 1.000 km = 0.621 mi
