= Bigfork, Montana =

Unincorporated community in Montana, United States

- Census-designated place
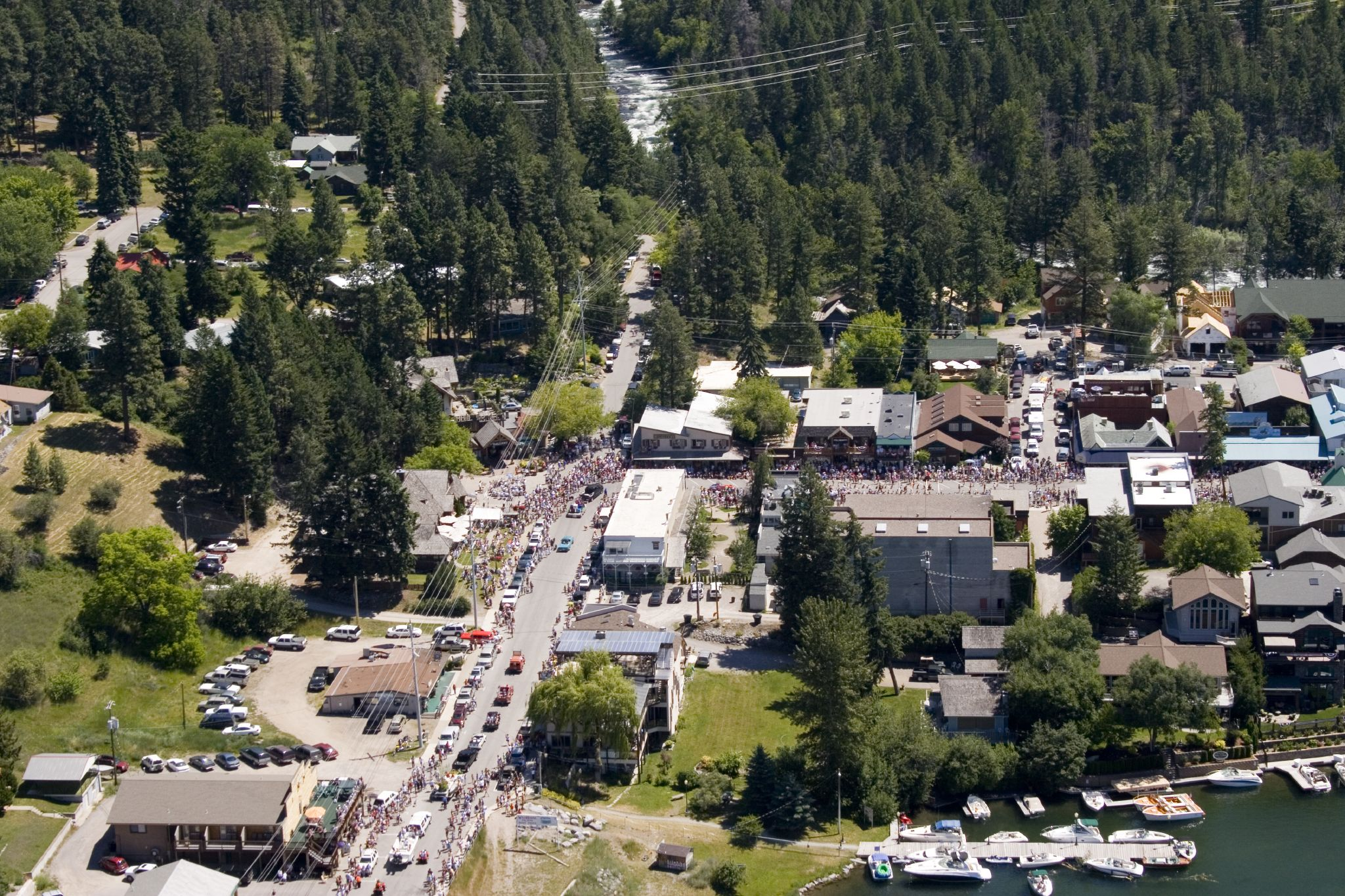
- Bigfork during Independence Day parade

- Location of Bigfork, Montana
- Coordinates: 48°05′15″N 114°02′24″W
- Country: United States
- State: Montana
- County: Flathead

Area
  - Total: 37.31 sq mi (96.63 km^{2})
  - Land: 31.25 sq mi (80.95 km^{2})
  - Water: 6.05 sq mi (15.68 km^{2})
- Elevation: 3,074 ft (937 m)

Population (2020)
  - Total: 5,118
  - Density: 163.8/sq mi (63.23/km^{2})
- Time zone: UTC-7 (Mountain (MST))
  - Summer (DST): UTC-6 (MDT)
- ZIP code: 59911
- Area code: 406
- FIPS code: 30-05875
- GNIS feature ID: 2407847
- Website: http://www.bigfork.org

Bigfork is a census-designated place (CDP) in Flathead County, Montana, United States. It is within Montana's Rocky Mountains. The population was 5,118 at the 2020 census, up from 4,270 in 2010.

== History ==
Some say the name "Bigfork" is derived from the Salish name for the area. However, Bigfork is a fork where two rivers, the Flathead River and the Swan River, flow in to the Flathead Lake. There are reports of a homestead and orchard immediately north of Bigfork as early as 1885. Everit L. Sliter set out 500 apple, cherry, plum, and pear trees in 1892 on Flathead Lake's east shore. He became the first postmaster in 1901. In 1902, he platted the Bigfork townsite at the mouth of the Swan River. The east shore has since become a major cherry-growing area. Wayfarers State Park lies just south of the community.

== Geography ==
Bigfork is located in south-central Flathead County at the north end of Flathead Lake. The western edge of the CDP is the Flathead River, the primary inflow of the lake. The Swan River flows into Flathead Lake from the east, entering the lake at the center of town. The CDP extends south to the Lake County line; east to Mud Lake, Mud Creek, and the north–south part of the Swan River; and northwards to the roads north of Echo Lake.

Kalispell is 18 miles (29 km) to the northwest, via Montana Highway 35, Montana Highway 82, and U.S. Route 93. Highway 35 runs through the center of Bigfork and proceeds south along the eastern shore of Flathead Lake, rejoining US 93 at Polson.

According to the United States Census Bureau, the Bigfork CDP has a total area of 37.3 square miles (96.6 km^{2}), of which 31.2 square miles (80.9 km^{2}) is land and 6.1 square miles (15.7 km^{2}), or 16.25%, is water.

== Demographics ==
Historical population
Census	Pop.	Note	%±
2000	1,421		—
2010	4,270		200.5%
2020	5,118		19.9%
U.S. Decennial Census

=== 2020 census ===
As of the 2020 census, Bigfork had a population of 5,118. The median age was 55.2 years. 16.3% of residents were under the age of 18 and 32.7% of residents were 65 years of age or older. For every 100 females there were 93.9 males, and for every 100 females age 18 and over there were 91.8 males age 18 and over.

0.0% of residents lived in urban areas, while 100.0% lived in rural areas.

There were 2,324 households in Bigfork, of which 19.3% had children under the age of 18 living in them. Of all households, 53.1% were married-couple households, 16.2% were households with a male householder and no spouse or partner present, and 25.2% were households with a female householder and no spouse or partner present. About 28.9% of all households were made up of individuals and 16.2% had someone living alone who was 65 years of age or older.

There were 3,413 housing units, of which 31.9% were vacant. The homeowner vacancy rate was 3.3% and the rental vacancy rate was 12.8%.

Racial composition as of the 2020 census
Race	Number	Percent
White	4,706	91.9%
Black or African American	15	0.3%
American Indian and Alaska Native	41	0.8%
Asian	23	0.4%
Native Hawaiian and Other Pacific Islander	2	0.0%
Some other race	69	1.3%
Two or more races	262	5.1%
Hispanic or Latino (of any race)	183	3.6%

=== 2010 census ===
As of the census of 2010, there were 4,270 people, 652 households, and 410 families residing in the CDP. The population density was 247.1 people per square mile (95.4 people/km^{2}). There were 962 housing units at an average density of 167.3 per square mile (64.6/km^{2}). The racial makeup of the CDP was 97.33% White, 0.35% African American, 1.06% Native American, 0.35% Asian, 0.14% Pacific Islander, 0.07% from other races, and 0.70% from two or more races. Hispanic or Latino of any race were 1.48% of the population.

There were 652 households, out of which 18.9% had children under the age of 18 living with them, 55.4% were married couples living together, 4.9% had a female householder with no husband present, and 37.0% were non-families. 33.3% of all households were made up of individuals, and 14.4% had someone living alone who was 65 years of age or older. The average household size was 2.08 and the average family size was 2.59.

In the CDP, the population was spread out, with 16.8% under the age of 18, 5.7% from 18 to 24, 18.2% from 25 to 44, 30.9% from 45 to 64, and 28.4% who were 65 years of age or older. The median age was 50 years. For every 100 females there were 91.8 males. For every 100 females age 18 and over, there were 85.8 males.

The median income for a household in the CDP was $36,116, and the median income for a family was $50,288. Males had a median income of $36,313 versus $23,542 for females. The per capita income for the CDP was $20,314. About 7.6% of families and 9.1% of the population were below the poverty line, including 10.0% of those under age 18 and 13.1% of those age 65 or over.

== Arts and culture ==
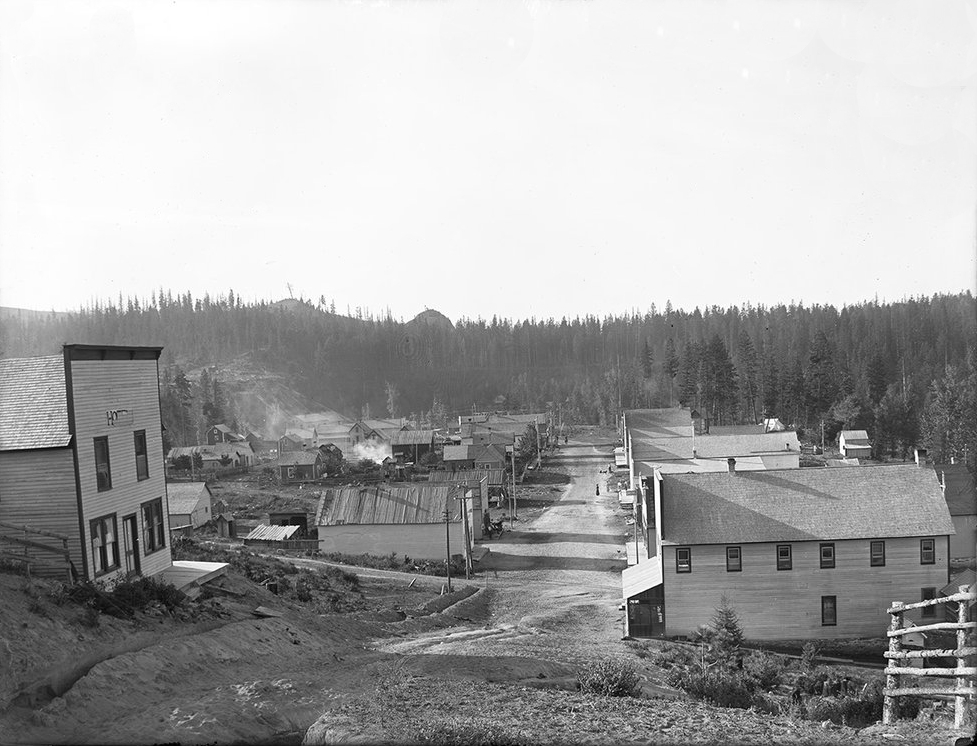
Bigfork, 1908

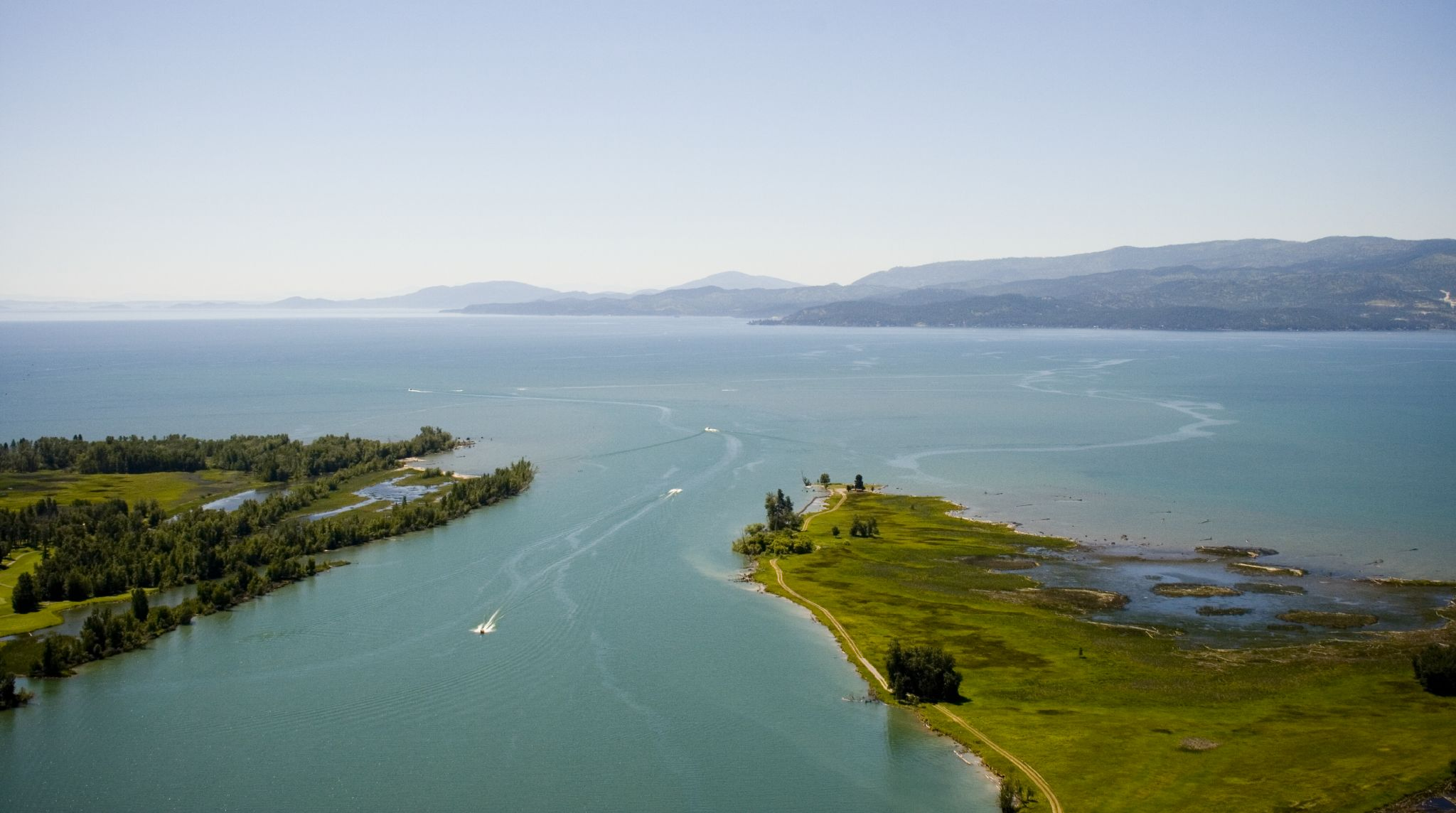
Flathead River emptying into the north end of Flathead Lake at Bigfork, with the Salish Mountains in the distance

Located on a bay of Flathead Lake, Bigfork boasts an array of tourist activities for every season. The town is home to a 27-hole golf course, art galleries, and live theatre. Visitors can rent boats or take a chartered tour of the lake. Nearby Jewel Basin offers hiking. Glacier National Park and the Bob Marshall Wilderness are only a short drive away. Bigfork Summer Playhouse offers Broadway-caliber productions every summer. Bigfork is also home to the Bigfork Independent Film Festival (BIFF) which is held in the fall. BIFF is where Montana-made films are shown and Montana filmmakers are recognized and awarded.

== Education ==
Bigfork School District educates students from kindergarten to 12th grade. Bigfork High School is home to the Vikings and Valkyries.

Bigfork has a public library, a branch of the Flathead County Library.

== Media ==
The Bigfork Eagle is a newspaper available either by print or online. It is published weekly.

The radio station KIBG is licensed in Bigfork. The town is also served by the wider Kalispell area.

== Notable people ==
- Dirk Benedict, actor, author, director
- Jack Hanna, zookeeper
- Lon Hinkle, professional golfer
- Bill Lindsay, former NHL forward
- Maury Povich, TV personality, publisher of Flathead Beacon
- J. K. Simmons, actor, worked at the Bigfork Summer Playhouse

== See also ==
- List of census-designated places in Montana
