= Flathead Lake =

Lake in Montana, United States

- člq̓etkʷ (Kalispel-Pend d'Oreille) yawuʔnik̓ ʔa·kuq̓nuk (Ktunaxa)
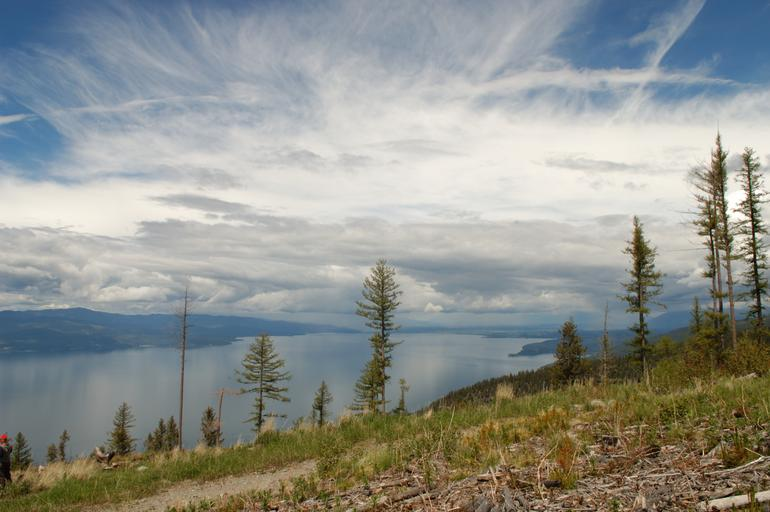

- Location within Montana Location within the United States
- Location: Lake / Flathead counties, Montana, US
- Coordinates: 47°54′6″N 114°6′15″W
- Type: Moraine-dammed lake
- Primary inflows: Flathead River; Swan River
- Primary outflows: Flathead River
- Catchment area: 8,587 sq mi (22,240 km^{2})
- Basin countries: United States
- Max. length: 27.3 mi (43.9 km)
- Max. width: 15.5 mi (24.9 km)
- Surface area: 197 sq mi (510 km^{2})
- Average depth: 164.7 ft (50.2 m)
- Max. depth: 370.7 ft (113.0 m)
- Water volume: 5.56 cu mi (23.2 km^{3})
- Residence time: 3.4 years
- Shore length^{1}: 161.4 mi (259.7 km)
- Surface elevation: 2,894 ft (882 m)
- Islands: Wild Horse Island; Cromwell, Bird, Bull, Little Bull, Melita, Shelter, Cedar, Mother-in-Law, Dream, Goose, Mary B, Rock Island; Douglas Islands
- Settlements: 7 miles (11 km) south of Kalispell, Montana; Polson, Montana
- ^{1} Shore length is not a well-defined measure.

Flathead Lake (Salish: člq̓etkʷ, Ktunaxa: yawuʔnik̓ ʔa·kuq̓nuk) is a large natural lake in northwest Montana, United States.

The lake is a remnant of the ancient, massive glacial dammed lake, Lake Missoula, of the era of the last interglacial. Flathead Lake is a natural lake along the mainline of the Flathead River. It was dammed in 1930 by Kerr Dam at its outlet on Polson Bay, slightly raising the lake level; the dam generates electricity. The hydroelectric has been owned and operated by the Confederated Salish and Kootenai Tribes since 2015. It is one of the cleanest lakes in the populated world for its size and type.

== Geography ==
Located in the northwest corner of the state of Montana, 7 miles (11 km) south of Kalispell, Flathead Lake is approximately 30 miles (48 km) long and 16 miles (26 km) wide, covering 197 square miles (510 km^{2}). It is a similar size to Minnesota's Mille Lacs Lake, but smaller than Red Lake. It is about half the area of San Francisco Bay (main bay). It is larger in surface area than Lake Tahoe but much smaller in volume due to Tahoe's depth. Flathead Lake has a maximum depth of 370.7 ft (113.0 m), and an average of 164.7 ft (50.2 m). This makes Flathead Lake deeper than the average depths of the Yellow Sea or the Persian Gulf. Flathead Lake is in a scenic part of Montana, 30 miles (48 km) southwest of Glacier National Park, and is flanked by two scenic highways, which wind along its curving shoreline. On the west side is U.S. Route 93, and on the east, is Route 35.

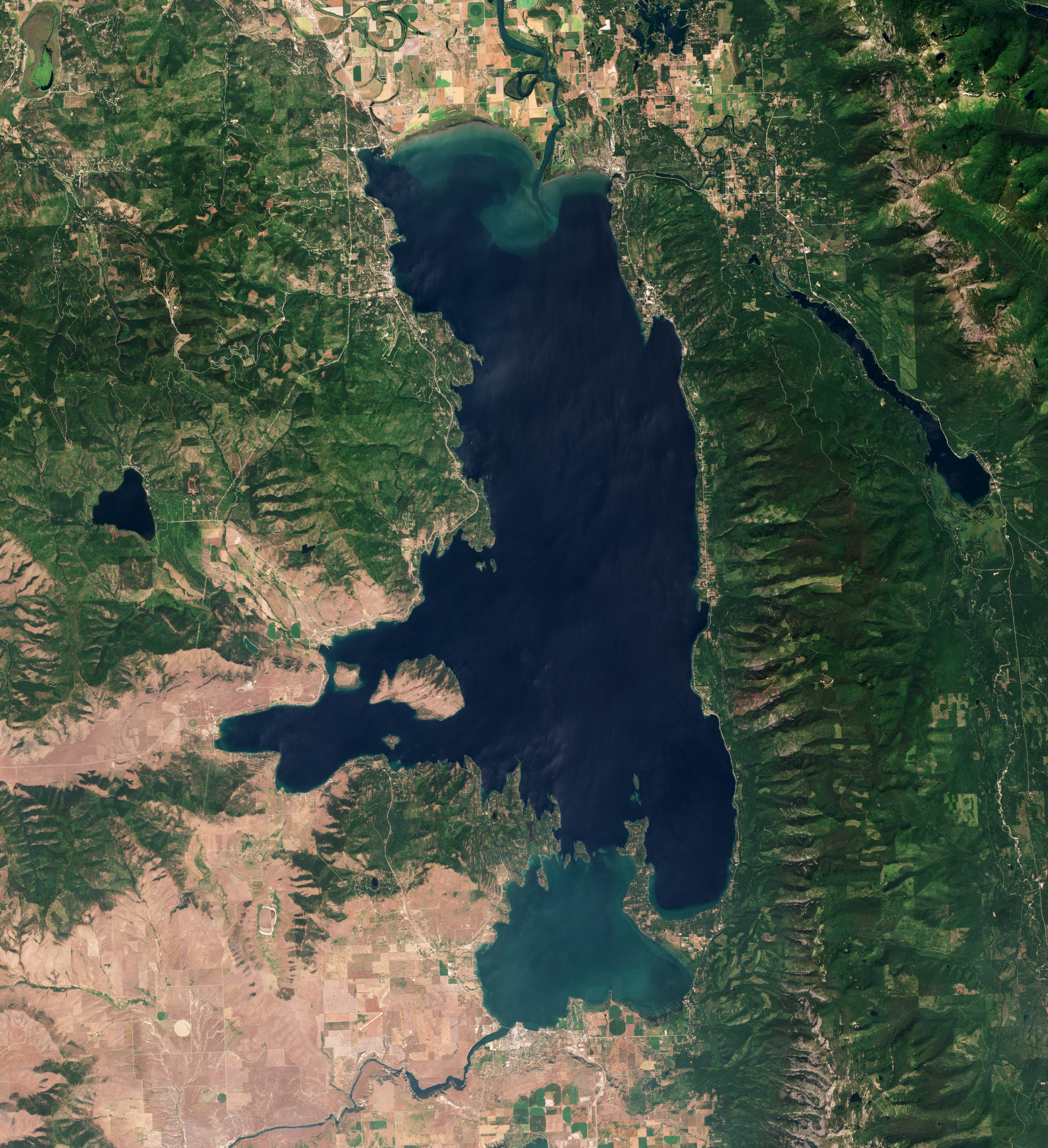
Flathead Lake from space, Aug 2018

The lake is bordered on its eastern shore by the Mission Mountains and on the west by the Salish Mountains. The Flathead valley was formed by the glacial damming of the Flathead River and sustains a remarkably mild climate for a region located this far north and inland; the Pacific Ocean is almost 400 miles (640 km) to the west. The mild climate allows for cherry orchards on the east shore and vineyards for wine production on the west shore. There are also apple, pear and plum orchards around the lake as well as vegetables, hay, honey, nursery tree, Christmas tree, sod/turf, and wheat production bordering or near the lake.

The lake has an irregularly shaped shoreline and a dozen small islands cover 5.5 square miles (14 km^{2}). Wild Horse Island is the largest island at 2,164 acres (876 ha). Melita Island is a 64-acre (260,000 m^{2}) island on Flathead Lake, located about one-half mile off the west lakeshore. At its highest point Melita is 80 feet (24 m) above water level. The island is owned by the Montana Council of the Boy Scouts of America. It is home to Camp Melita Island and is used and for other activities; there is a project for woodland rehabilitation run by the Montana Council. There is also a bald eagle reserve which is protected by the Native Americans. Boy Scouts began using the island in the 1940s.

== Geology ==
Flathead Lake lies at the southern end of a geological feature called the Rocky Mountain Trench. The trench, which formed with the Rocky Mountains, extends north into the southern Yukon as a straight, steep valley, which also holds the headwaters of the Columbia River. During the last ice age this trench was filled by an enormous glacier. As the glacier moved southward it carved out the trench. The Polson Moraine, near present-day Polson, Montana, marks the southernmost extent of the glacier during the last ice age and thus is the site of the glacier's terminal moraine.

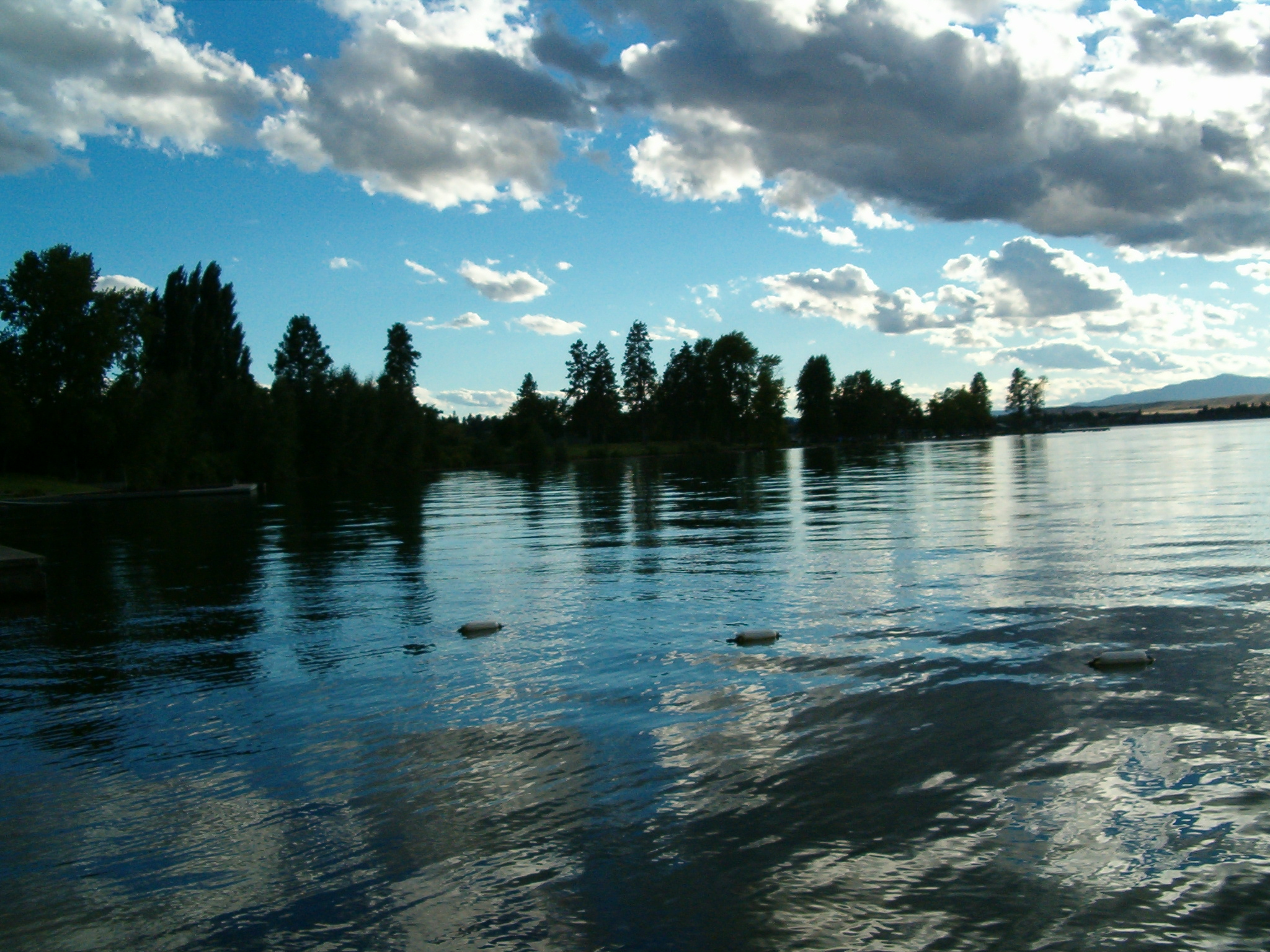
Clouds over Flathead Lake in Polson, Montana, as the sun sets

The large size of the Polson Moraine indicates that the glacier stalled here for many years before retreating. As the climate warmed, a portion of the glacier in the Mission Valley receded more slowly than the main body, which kept the lake basin from being filled with sediment. Eventually this ice also melted, forming a lake behind the moraine. Once the water reached the top of this moraine dam, it began to cut a channel through it. Most moraine dammed lakes drain quickly because water cuts entirely through the moraine. Flathead Lake remained because a bedrock hill buried underneath the Polson Moraine prevented the moraine from being completely cut through so the meltwater never completely drained.

At one time, probably when the valley was partially filled by a glacier, the level of Flathead Lake was about 500 feet (150 m) higher and drained through the valley west of Elmo, Montana, which is at the end of Big Arm Bay, bottom center in the aerial photo above. Water carved out a wide, flat-bottomed pass with a deeper, narrow channel at the south edge of the pass. The deeper channel and traces of the dry riverbed are still visible from Route 28.

== Management ==
The Flathead River and the Swan River (known also as the Bigfork River where it enters the lake) are the major tributaries of the five tributaries that are within the Flathead Watershed. Numerous small streams flow into the lake, particularly on the wetter east shore. The Seli’š Ksanka Qlispe’ Dam, formerly known as Kerr Dam and built near Polson, controls the top 10-foot of the lake (3.0 m), generates hydroelectric power, and provides water for irrigation to support a federal irrigation project in the area. Minimum outflow levels from Flathead Lake are designated by the Federal Energy Regulatory Commission (FERC) and are based on flood risk management, power generation requirements, and biological needs to support aquatic life in river systems.

The lake is downstream of Hungry Horse Dam on the South Fork Flathead River. The Hungry Horse Dam is managed by the Bureau of Reclamation to provide beneficial flow conditions and to provide safe passage for migrating juvenile fish to reach the Columbia River Estuary and the Pacific Ocean. The Columbia River Technical Management Team makes operational recommendations to the agencies that control federal dams. Made up of representatives from four states, five federal agencies and six tribal nations, it prioritizes fish and wildlife above other system benefits. The Columbia River system has 14 projects that must be operated to meet congressionally authorized purposes.

Drought conditions can impact the operator's ability to sustain water levels to support summer lake activities given the legally required steamflows that must be maintained at a certain level to protect downstream fisheries. Variations to the Flood Risk Management Plan can be approved by the U.S. Army Corps of Engineers in response to continuing dry conditions. For example, the summer of 2023 had abnormally low water levels that impacted local businesses that rely on activity around Flathead Lake, and led to navigation concerns. The next year variations to the Flood Risk Management Plan were requested and approved in response to the continuing dry conditions. In 2025, drought conditions again impacted the ability to sustain water levels until unusually wet weather kept the lake near full pool until the end of July.

== History ==
Once known as "Salish Lake", this body of water was named for the Salish Indians. Early European explorers, like David Thompson, called them the Flathead Indians because of a misinterpretation of early Native American sign language. In 1855 the United States made the Treaty of Hellgate, by which it set aside the Flathead Reservation solely for use of the Flathead, encompassing an area including much of Flathead Lake.

== Fauna ==
Flathead Lake is home to a number of native and non-native fishes, and is managed cooperatively by both Montana Fish, Wildlife and Parks and the Confederated Salish and Kootenai Tribes. The lake is inhabited by the native bull trout and cutthroat trout, as well as the non-native lake trout, yellow perch, and lake whitefish. Local residents have reported sighting other aquatic fauna in the lake as well, such as sturgeon and the Flathead Lake Monster.

The non-native opossum shrimp, (Mysis diluviana), were introduced by Montana Department of Fish, Wildlife and Parks in the Flathead drainage basin to encourage production of larger kokanee salmon; they migrated into Flathead Lake and have altered the ecosystem.

Fishermen had introduced lake trout 80 years prior to the introduction of opossum shrimp, but they remained at low densities until the non-native Mysis became established. The bottom-dwelling mysids eliminated a recruitment bottleneck for lake trout by providing a deep water source of food where little was available previously. Lake trout subsequently flourished on mysids; this voracious piscivore now dominates the lake fishery. The formerly abundant kokanee were extirpated, and native bull and westslope cutthroat trout are imperiled. Predation by Mysis has shifted zooplankton and phytoplankton community size structure. Bayesian change point analysis of primary productivity (27-y time series) showed a significant step increase of 55 mg C m−2 d−1 (i.e., 21% rise) concurrent with the mysid invasion, but little trend before or after despite increasing nutrient loading. Mysis facilitated predation by lake trout and indirectly caused the collapse of kokanee, redirecting energy flow through the ecosystem that would otherwise have been available to other top predators (bald eagles).

Like the majority of other nonnative species, the lake trout (Salvelinus namaycush) became established in the lake from the late 1800s-early 1900s. The introduction of lake trout has placed increased pressure on the ecologically similar threatened native bull trout (Salvelinus confluentus). The semi-annual "Mack Days" Lake Trout fishing contest aims to reduce the non-native "Mackinaw trout" or lake trout populations, as well as educate people about the Flathead Lake Fisheries Management Plan. Since the inception of this event in 2002, over 402,000 lake trout have been harvested.

- Native
1. Cutthroat trout
2. Northern pikeminnow
3. Bull trout
4. Mountain whitefish
5. Westslope cutthroat trout
- Nonnative
1. Brown trout
2. Lake trout
3. Golden trout
4. Yellowstone cutthroat trout
5. Brook trout
6. Rainbow trout
7. Kokanee salmon
8. Northern pike
9. Yellow perch
10. Largemouth bass
11. Smallmouth bass
12. Sturgeon (sp)

In addition to these commonly pursued game fish, the lake is also home to other native species that currently are not actively managed by government fish and wildlife agencies, including the longnose sucker (Catostomus catostomus), redside shiner (Richardsonius balteatus), and slimy sculpin (Cottus cognatus).

== Panorama ==
Flathead Lake at Lakeside with Swan and Mission Range in the background
