= List of Montana locations by per capita income =

Ranked Montana's Per Capita Income Distribution by County latest official survey

Total Montana per capita income (wikidata:Q1212) = 32,463 US$ (2020 survey methodology)
(WD = Wikidata page)

[Hide/show County Per Capita Income]
	Montana	per. US$	year
1	Liberty County, Montana	46,198	2020^{WD}
2	Gallatin County, Montana	38,885	2020^{WD}
3	Sheridan County, Montana	37,958	2020^{WD}
4	Yellowstone County, Montana	37,261	2020^{WD}
5	Lewis and Clark County, Montana	36,485	2020^{WD}
6	Fallon County, Montana	36,409	2020^{WD}
7	Madison County, Montana	35,668	2020^{WD}
8	Park County, Montana	35,446	2020^{WD}
9	Stillwater County, Montana	35,387	2020^{WD}
10	Carbon County, Montana	34,751	2020^{WD}
11	Judith Basin County, Montana	33,720	2020^{WD}
12	Jefferson County, Montana	33,716	2020^{WD}
13	Treasure County, Montana	33,685	2020^{WD}
14	Daniels County, Montana	33,614	2020^{WD}
15	Missoula County, Montana	33,358	2020^{WD}
16	Powder River County, Montana	33,170	2020^{WD}
17	Granite County, Montana	32,401	2020^{WD}
18	Flathead County, Montana	32,242	2020^{WD}
19	Broadwater County, Montana	31,573	2020^{WD}
20	Ravalli County, Montana	31,545	2020^{WD}
21	Custer County, Montana	31,267	2020^{WD}
22	McCone County, Montana	31,242	2020^{WD}
23	Dawson County, Montana	30,821	2020^{WD}
24	Cascade County, Montana	30,572	2020^{WD}
25	Richland County, Montana	30,330	2020^{WD}
26	Toole County, Montana	30,213	2020^{WD}
27	Golden Valley County, Montana	30,053	2020^{WD}
28	Garfield County, Montana	29,149	2020^{WD}
29	Prairie County, Montana	28,892	2020^{WD}
30	Beaverhead County, Montana	28,798	2020^{WD}
31	Mineral County, Montana	28,644	2020^{WD}
32	Valley County, Montana	28,440	2020^{WD}
33	Silver Bow County, Montana	28,221	2020^{WD}
34	Petroleum County, Montana	28,220	2020^{WD}
35	Fergus County, Montana	28,211	2020^{WD}
36	Teton County, Montana	27,985	2020^{WD}
37	Musselshell County, Montana	27,843	2020^{WD}
38	Carter County, Montana	27,759	2020^{WD}
39	Sweet Grass County, Montana	27,553	2020^{WD}
40	Pondera County, Montana	27,114	2020^{WD}
41	Lake County, Montana	26,889	2020^{WD}
42	Phillips County, Montana	26,825	2020^{WD}
43	Wibaux County, Montana	26,405	2020^{WD}
44	Meagher County, Montana	26,392	2020^{WD}
45	Chouteau County, Montana	26,243	2020^{WD}
46	Deer Lodge County, Montana	26,207	2020^{WD}
47	Sanders County, Montana	26,103	2020^{WD}
48	Rosebud County, Montana	25,557	2020^{WD}
49	Lincoln County, Montana	25,169	2020^{WD}
50	Powell County, Montana	25,002	2020^{WD}
51	Hill County, Montana	23,922	2020^{WD}
52	Wheatland County, Montana	21,409	2020^{WD}
53	Blaine County, Montana	20,586	2020^{WD}
54	Big Horn County, Montana	19,109	2020^{WD}
55	Roosevelt County, Montana	18,669	2020^{WD}
56	Glacier County, Montana	18,440	2020^{WD}

Montana was in 2000 the forty-sixth richest state in the United States of America, with a per capita income of $17,151. In 2020 the state's per capita income was $32,463 which remained under the United States medium.

== Per capita income and household income ==
Montana economic demographics by county as of 31 December 2020
State	County	Per capita income	Median house– hold income	Total income	Population	Number of house– holds
United States		$35,384	$98,357	$120,344,871 million	340,110,988	122,354,219
Montana		$32,463	$80,718	$351,971 million	1,084,225	436,048
	Beaverhead County	$28,798	$64,207	$2,698 million	9,371	4,203
	Big Horn County	$19,109	$69,239	$2,507 million	13,124	3,622
	Blaine County	$20,586	$60,445	$1,450 million	7,044	2,399
	Broadwater County	$31,573	$87,797	$2,138 million	6,774	2,436
	Carbon County	$34,751	$80,448	$3,639 million	10,473	4,524
	Carter County	$27,759	$60,429	$392 million	1,415	650
	Cascade County	$30,572	$74,933	$25,807 million	84,414	34,440
	Chouteau County	$26,243	$67,232	$1,547 million	5,895	2,301
	Custer County	$31,267	$76,709	$3,710 million	11,867	4,837
	Daniels County	$33,614	$65,225	$558 million	1,661	856
	Dawson County	$30,821	$70,796	$2,755 million	8,940	3,892
	Deer Lodge County	$26,207	$60,677	$2,468 million	9,421	4,069
	Fallon County	$36,409	$87,135	$1,110 million	3,049	1,274
	Fergus County	$28,211	$63,852	$3,229 million	11,446	5,057
	Flathead County	$32,242	$84,274	$33,646 million	104,357	39,925
	Gallatin County	$38,885	$102,143	$46,257 million	118,960	45,287
	Garfield County	$29,149	$78,242	$341 million	1,173	437
	Glacier County	$18,440	$61,103	$2,540 million	13,778	4,158
	Golden Valley County	$30,053	$68,514	$247 million	823	361
	Granite County	$32,401	$79,125	$1,072 million	3,309	1,355
	Hill County	$23,922	$60,291	$3,901 million	16,309	6,471
	Jefferson County	$33,716	$91,666	$4,074 million	12,085	4,445
	Judith Basin County	$33,720	$74,552	$682 million	2,023	915
	Lake County	$26,889	$70,533	$8,371 million	31,134	11,869
	Lewis and Clark County	$36,485	$90,851	$25,894 million	70,973	28,502
	Liberty County	$46,198	$97,839	$905 million	1,959	925
	Lincoln County	$25,169	$57,440	$4,952 million	19,677	8,622
	McCone County	$31,242	$66,035	$540 million	1,729	818
	Madison County	$35,668	$82,968	$3,075 million	8,623	3,707
	Meagher County	$26,392	$67,005	$508 million	1,927	759
	Mineral County	$28,644	$67,445	$1,299 million	4,535	1,926
	Missoula County	$33,358	$79,147	$39,336 million	117,922	49,700
	Musselshell County	$27,843	$59,564	$1,316 million	4,730	2,211
	Park County	$35,446	$76,542	$6,093 million	17,191	7,961
	Petroleum County	$28,220	$66,024	$139 million	496	212
	Phillips County	$26,825	$64,419	$1,131 million	4,217	1,756
	Pondera County	$27,114	$76,920	$1,599 million	5,898	2,079
	Powder River County	$33,170	$75,120	$561 million	1,694	748
	Powell County	$25,002	$69,051	$1,736 million	6,946	2,515
	Prairie County	$28,892	$62,618	$314 million	1,088	502
	Ravalli County	$31,545	$78,183	$13,934 million	44,174	17,823
	Richland County	$30,330	$79,065	$3,485 million	11,491	4,408
	Roosevelt County	$18,669	$62,042	$2,015 million	10,794	3,248
	Rosebud County	$25,557	$65,759	$2,128 million	8,329	3,237
	Sanders County	$26,103	$61,290	$3,236 million	12,400	5,281
	Sheridan County	$37,958	$87,059	$1,343 million	3,539	1,543
	Silver Bow County	$28,221	$65,984	$9,914 million	35,133	15,026
	Stillwater County	$35,387	$82,597	$3,171 million	8,963	3,840
	Sweet Grass County	$27,553	$66,891	$1,013 million	3,678	1,515
	Teton County	$27,985	$69,805	$1,742 million	6,226	2,496
	Toole County	$30,213	$82,205	$1,501 million	4,971	1,827
	Treasure County	$33,685	$77,080	$256 million	762	333
	Valley County	$28,440	$64,837	$2,155 million	7,578	3,324
	Wheatland County	$21,409	$49,381	$442 million	2,069	897
	Wibaux County	$26,405	$51,868	$247 million	937	477
	Yellowstone County	$37,261	$90,202	$61,380 million	164,731	68,047

Note: Data is automatically updated to be the latest on Wikidata. At the time of page automation this was the 2020 United States Census and the 2016–2020 American Community Survey.

== Montana places ranked by per capita income as of 2000 ==
1. Cooke City-Silver Gate, Montana – $31,618
2. Big Sky, Montana – $31,492
3. Rollins, Montana – $27,255
4. Jette, Montana – $25,808
5. West Havre, Montana – $24,823
6. Opheim, Montana – $24,680
7. Whitefish, Montana – $23,098
8. Joplin, Montana – $22,014
9. Saddle Butte, Montana – $22,768
10. Clancy, Montana – $22,492
11. Kings Point, Montana – $22,827
12. Jefferson City, Montana – $21,953
13. Montana City, Montana – $21,774
14. Wye, Montana – $21,553
15. Frenchtown, Montana – $21,225
16. Absarokee, Montana – $20,677
17. Colstrip, Montana – $20,336
18. Bigfork, Montana – $20,314
19. Helena Valley Northeast, Montana – $20,283
20. Neihart, Montana – $20,266
21. Helena, Montana – $20,020
22. Finley Point, Montana – $19,575
23. Beaver Creek, Montana – $19,566
24. Westby, Montana – $19,438
25. Carter, Montana – $19,397
26. Billings, Montana – $19,207
27. Virginia City, Montana – $19,182
28. West Yellowstone, Montana – $19,136
29. Red Lodge, Montana – $19,090
30. Helena Valley West Central, Montana – $18,920
31. Winston, Montana – $18,846
32. Seeley Lake, Montana – $18,825
33. Coram, Montana – $18,799
34. Flaxville, Montana – $18,567
35. Lakeside, Montana – $18,533
36. Custer, Montana – $18,532
37. Dayton, Montana – $18,501
38. Lolo, Montana – $18,369
39. Helena West Side, Montana – $18,299
40. Black Eagle, Montana – $18,269
41. Four Corners, Montana – $18,185
42. Wisdom, Montana – $18,172
43. Wibaux, Montana – $18,105
44. Great Falls, Montana – $18,059
45. Forsyth, Montana – $17,994
46. Fort Peck, Montana – $17,943
47. Helena Valley Northwest, Montana – $17,910
48. Orchard Homes, Montana – $17,885
49. Gardiner, Montana – $17,810
50. Columbus, Montana – $17,689
51. Gildford, Montana – $17,648
52. Florence, Montana – $17,626
53. Victor, Montana – $17,599
54. Rocky Point, Montana – $17,576
55. Big Timber, Montana – $17,569
56. Baker, Montana – $17,461
57. Jordan, Montana – $17,426
58. Fort Shaw, Montana – $17,381
59. East Glacier Park Village, Montana – $17,318
60. Ennis, Montana – $17,310
61. Missoula, Montana – $17,166
62. Scobey, Montana – $17,150
63. Butte-Silver Bow (balance), Montana – $17,068
64. Bridger, Montana – $17,060
65. Manhattan, Montana – $17,024
66. Laurel, Montana – $16,953
67. Park City, Montana – $16,912
68. Sidney, Montana – $16,911
69. Rudyard, Montana – $16,889
70. Lewistown, Montana – $16,817
71. Amsterdam-Churchill, Montana – $16,767
72. Ballantine, Montana – $16,707
73. Livingston, Montana – $16,636
74. Big Arm, Montana – $16,620
75. Power, Montana – $16,527
76. Hingham, Montana – $16,525
77. Kicking Horse, Montana – $16,524
78. Elliston, Montana – $16,501
79. Miles City, Montana – $16,449
80. Dillon, Montana – $16,432
81. Saco, Montana – $16,421
82. Malta, Montana – $16,405
83. Medicine Lake, Montana – $16,405
84. Reed Point, Montana – $16,389
85. St. Marie, Montana – $16,314
86. Alder, Montana – $16,300
87. Glasgow, Montana – $16,246
88. Kalispell, Montana – $16,224
89. Lonepine, Montana – $16,218
90. Bozeman, Montana – $16,104
91. West Glendive, Montana – $16,100
92. Chester, Montana – $16,077
93. Chinook, Montana – $16,038
94. Cut Bank, Montana – $15,977
95. Broadus, Montana – $15,938
96. Trout Creek, Montana – $15,910
97. East Helena, Montana – $15,893
98. Havre, Montana – $15,847
99. Woods Bay, Montana – $15,792
100. Hysham, Montana – $15,743
101. Conrad, Montana – $15,742
102. Sun Prairie, Montana – $15,685
103. Bonner-West Riverside, Montana – $15,652
104. Clyde Park, Montana – $15,646
105. Plentywood, Montana – $15,609
106. Inverness, Montana – $15,594
107. Anaconda-Deer Lodge County, Montana – $15,580
108. Glendive, Montana – $15,544
109. Whitehall, Montana – $15,527
110. Klein, Montana – $15,522
111. Evaro, Montana – $15,465
112. Nashua, Montana – $15,452
113. Geraldine, Montana – $15,403
114. Culbertson, Montana – $15,393
115. Sheridan, Montana – $15,369
116. Three Forks, Montana – $15,362
117. Belgrade, Montana – $15,266
118. Fairfield, Montana – $15,255
119. Stanford, Montana – $15,253
120. Sunburst, Montana – $15,244
121. Roundup, Montana – $15,123
122. Terry, Montana – $15,093
123. Shelby, Montana – $15,071
124. Melstone, Montana – $15,027
125. Froid, Montana – $15,021
126. Ovando, Montana – $15,012
127. Hobson, Montana – $15,002
128. Choteau, Montana – $14,999
129. Bainville, Montana – $14,997
130. Denton, Montana – $14,982
131. Belt, Montana – $14,970
132. Philipsburg, Montana – $14,951
133. Deer Lodge, Montana – $14,883
134. Valier, Montana – $14,862
135. Fort Benton, Montana – $14,861
136. Big Sandy, Montana – $14,801
137. Radersburg, Montana – $14,733
138. Heron, Montana – $14,725
139. Stevensville, Montana – $14,700
140. Hamilton, Montana – $14,689
141. Richey, Montana – $14,684
142. Pablo, Montana – $14,672
143. Fromberg, Montana – $14,667
144. Boulder, Montana – $14,657
145. Sun River, Montana – $14,647
146. Dutton, Montana – $14,638
147. Augusta, Montana – $14,608
148. Ulm, Montana – $14,602
149. Wilsall, Montana – $14,585
150. Lockwood, Montana – $14,579
151. Highwood, Montana – $14,457
152. Lambert, Montana (Fox Lake CDP) – $14,443
153. Plevna, Montana – $14,360
154. Columbia Falls, Montana – $14,355
155. Noxon, Montana – $14,350
156. Helena Valley Southeast, Montana – $14,349
157. Worden, Montana – $14,319
158. Evergreen, Montana – $14,277
159. Lincoln, Montana – $14,243
160. Cascade, Montana – $14,219
161. Drummond, Montana – $14,213
162. Walkerville, Montana – $14,156
163. Superior, Montana – $14,154
164. St. Regis, Montana – $14,137
165. Ravalli, Montana – $14,094
166. Kevin, Montana – $14,003
167. Huntley, Montana – $13,913
168. White Sulphur Springs, Montana – $13,836
169. Somers, Montana – $13,786
170. Polson, Montana – $13,777
171. Reserve, Montana – $13,742
172. Harlowton, Montana – $13,717
173. Townsend, Montana – $13,674
174. Riverbend, Montana – $13,672
175. Ekalaka, Montana – $13,667
176. Wolf Point, Montana – $13,605
177. Vaughn, Montana – $13,600
178. Bearcreek, Montana – $13,572
179. Circle, Montana – $13,412
180. East Missoula, Montana – $13,333
181. Harlem, Montana – $13,295
182. Harrison, Montana – $13,287
183. Joliet, Montana – $13,254
184. Willow Creek, Montana – $13,251
185. Thompson Falls, Montana – $13,245
186. Fairview, Montana – $13,235
187. Belfry, Montana – $13,186
188. Twin Bridges, Montana – $13,171
189. Lima, Montana – $13,163
190. Fortine, Montana – $13,140
191. Moore, Montana – $13,140
192. Alberton, Montana – $13,120
193. Libby, Montana – $13,090
194. Outlook, Montana – $13,066
195. Hardin, Montana – $13,041
196. Shepherd, Montana – $13,025
197. Plains, Montana – $13,010
198. Agency, Montana – $12,990
199. Martin City, Montana – $12,896
200. Loma, Montana – $12,885
201. Broadview, Montana – $12,882
202. De Borgia, Montana – $12,791
203. Avon, Montana – $12,777
204. Hot Springs, Montana – $12,690
205. Garrison, Montana – $12,678
206. Eureka, Montana – $12,619
207. Winifred, Montana – $12,600
208. Kremlin, Montana – $12,598
209. Clinton, Montana – $12,510
210. Lavina, Montana – $12,475
211. Rexford, Montana – $12,355
212. St. Ignatius, Montana – $12,336
213. Greycliff, Montana – $12,023
214. Ryegate, Montana – $12,016
215. Toston, Montana – $11,945
216. Basin, Montana – $11,878
217. Knife River, Montana – $11,865
218. Herron, Montana – $11,779
219. Camp Three, Montana – $11,767
220. Simms, Montana – $11,758
221. Ronan, Montana – $11,678
222. Darby, Montana – $11,658
223. St. Xavier, Montana – $11,578
224. Arlee, Montana – $11,558
225. Malmstrom AFB, Montana – $11,450
226. Niarada, Montana – $11,388
227. Sčilíp, Montana – $11,379
228. Lewistown Heights, Montana – $11,274
229. Grass Range, Montana – $10,939
230. Havre North, Montana – $10,921
231. Winnett, Montana – $10,892
232. Fort Smith, Montana – $10,692
233. Charlo, Montana – $10,687
234. Troy, Montana – $10,620
235. Poplar, Montana – $10,579
236. Hungry Horse, Montana – $10,530
237. Dodson, Montana – $10,187
238. Corvallis, Montana – $10,167
239. Ismay, Montana – $9,852
240. Turtle Lake, Montana – $9,838
241. Cardwell, Montana – $9,716
242. Fallon, Montana – $9,701
243. Ashland, Montana – $9,577
244. St. Pierre, Montana – $9,437
245. Paradise, Montana – $9,405
246. Birney, Montana – $9,338
247. Fort Belknap Agency, Montana – $9,053
248. Browning, Montana – $8,955
249. Judith Gap, Montana – $8,927
250. North Browning, Montana – $8,572
251. Musselshell, Montana – $8,501
252. Busby, Montana – $8,383
253. Brockton, Montana – $8,231
254. Lodge Grass, Montana – $8,130
255. Starr School, Montana – $8,105
256. Wyola, Montana – $7,815
257. Pryor, Montana – $7,640
258. Old Agency, Montana – $7,623
259. Parker School, Montana – $7,453
260. Crow Agency, Montana – $7,354
261. Lame Deer, Montana – $7,247
262. Heart Butte, Montana – $6,845
263. Sangrey, Montana – $6,519
264. Hays, Montana – $6,489
265. Frazer, Montana – $6,435
266. Lodge Pole, Montana – $6,276
267. Box Elder, Montana – $6,128
268. South Browning, Montana – $5,666
269. Antelope, Montana – $5,455
270. Azure, Montana – $5,407
271. Boneau, Montana – $5,200
272. Pinesdale, Montana – $5,051
273. Muddy, Montana – $4,837
274. Elmo, Montana – $2,778
275. Kerr, Montana – $0
