= Flathead Indian Reservation =

Flathead Indian Reservation Confederated Salish and Kootenai Tribes
- Indian reservation
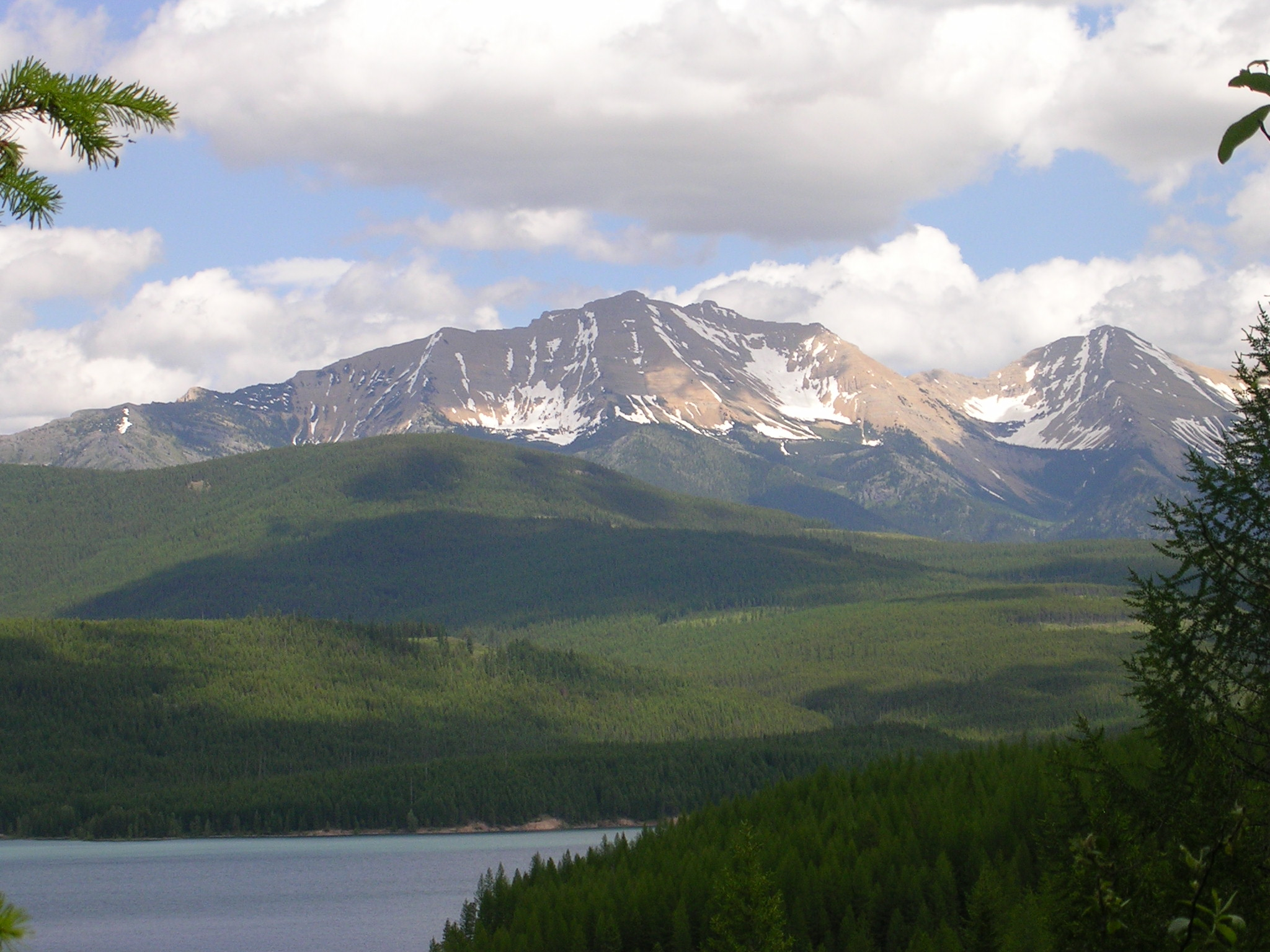
- View northeastward across Hungry Horse Reservoir onto the Flathead Range, Montana

- Location in Montana
- Coordinates: 47°29′59″N 114°16′46″W
- Tribe: Confederated Salish and Kootenai
- Country: United States
- State: Montana
- Counties: Flathead; Lake; Missoula; Sanders
- Established: 1855
- Headquarters: Pablo

Government
  - Body: Tribal Council
  - Chairman: Michael Dolson
  - Vice-Chairman: Jami Pluff

Area
  - Total: 5,020 km^{2} (1,940 sq mi)

Population (2017)
  - Total: 29,218
  - Density: 5.82/km^{2} (15.1/sq mi)
- Time zone: UTC-7 (MST)
  - Summer (DST): UTC-6 (MDT)
- Website: cskt.org

The Flathead Indian Reservation, located in western Montana on the Flathead River, is home to the Bitterroot Salish, Kootenai, and Pend d'Oreilles tribes – also known as the Confederated Salish and Kootenai Tribes of the Flathead Nation. The reservation, often referred to as the Flathead Nation, or simply Flathead or by its official acronym C.S.K.T., was created through the July 16, 1855, Treaty of Hellgate.

It has land in four of Montana's counties: Lake, Sanders, Missoula, and Flathead, and controls most of Flathead Lake. The Flathead Indian Reservation, west of the Continental Divide, consists of 1,938 square miles (5,020 km^{2}) (1,317,000 acres (533,000 ha)) of forested mountains and valleys.

== Formation and land distribution ==
Native Americans have lived in Montana for more than 12,000 years, based on archaeological findings. The "Flathead" Salish and Kalispel are the easternmost of the Salishan tribes, and are considered by tribal elders to be "the head or parent tribe" from which other Salishan groups dispersed downstream. Kootenai groups stretch north and west into what is now Idaho and Canada, with only the southeastern Ksanka band being primarily connected to the Flathead Reservation. The Kootenai left artifacts in prehistoric time. One group of the Kootenai in the northeast lived mainly on bison hunting. Another group lived on the rivers and lakes of the mountains in the west. When they moved east, they could rely less on salmon fishing, but turned to eating plants and bison. During the 18th century, the Salish and the Kootenai tribes shared gathering and hunting grounds. As European-American settlers entered the area, the different cultures of peoples came into conflict.

In 1855 the United States (US) made the Treaty of Hellgate, by which it set aside a reservation solely for use of the Flathead, encompassing an area including much of Flathead Lake. By the late 19th and early 20th century, the federal government had adopted a policy of allotting lands to individual Indian households from their communal holdings, in order to encourage subsistence farming and adoption of European-American ways.

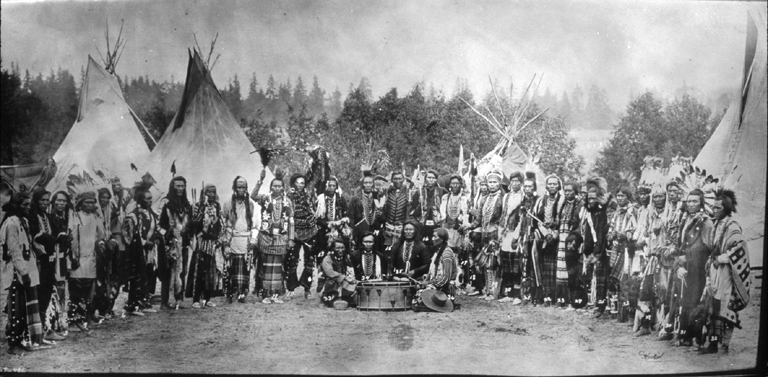
Salish men near tipis (1903, Flathead Reservation, Montana)

Although the Flathead opposed such European-style allotments and farming, the US Congress passed the 1904 Flathead Allotment Act. Construction of the Flathead Indian Irrigation Project using the Mission Mountains as the water source was also authorized by Congress. Thousands of acres on the reservation were reserved for town sites, schools and the National Bison Range. The Flathead were given first choice of either 80 or 160 acres (32 or 65 ha) of land per household.

According to their treaty, the tribes have the right to off-reservation hunting, but the state believed it could regulate those activities. State game wardens were responsible for a violent confrontation in 1908 with a small Pend d'Oreilles hunting party, which resulted in deaths of four of the Native Americans, in what is known as the Swan Valley Massacre. A court challenge to their hunting rights reached the US Supreme Court, which upheld tribal treaty rights to hunt off-reservation in their former territory.

After allotments of land to individual households of members on the tribal rolls, the government declared the rest of the communal land to be "surplus" and opened the reservation to homesteading for White settlement. United States Senator Joseph M. Dixon of Montana played a key role in getting this legislation passed. Most tribal members chose land close to the mountains where wild game still roamed, so prime farmland in the middle of the valleys was available. When it opened in 1910, 81,363 applications by whites were received for 1,600 parcels of land. Lottery winners took only 600 tracts, leaving 1,000 tracts still open. These were taken in what the tribe considers a subsequent "land grab". The distribution of the lands caused much resentment by the Flathead as homesteaders started fencing the land, claiming water rights from streams and diverting water for irrigation. Congress amended the act to authorize the construction of irrigation systems for homesteaded lands within the reservation. The United States Reclamation Service began reconnaissance surveys in 1907 and actual work commenced in the summer of 1908. The tribes requested the establishment of the Pablo National Wildlife Refuge which was established in 1921, subject to reservoir uses for the irrigation project. The Tribes manage the fishery resources in the Pablo Reservoir. Originally a joint project, the Indian Service gained control of Flathead Irrigation Project in 1924. With the rugged mountains and valleys, numerous waterways diverse in size, and a large amount of natural lakes, the project was not completed until 1963.

== Management ==
A tribal council was formed in response to the 1934 Indian Reorganization Act. They were the first tribes to organize a tribal government under the act. Under the Indian Self-Determination and Education Assistance Act of 1975, the tribal council was finally able to begin gradually taking over management of law enforcement, justice, forestry, wildlife, and health and human services programs. The Flathead have worked to regain control of the reservation lands and acquire some of the approximately one-half of the land base appropriated by non-Indians. The allotment of reservation lands remains "a very sensitive issue".

The tribes applied to Congress and began managing the Mission Valley Power Company in 1988, which serves the reservation. Their bid to take over the federal operating license for Kerr Dam wasn't successful, but the tribes obtained exclusive rights to purchase the facility in 2015, and a larger rent payment.

The Flathead Indian Irrigation Project had been operated by the Bureau of Indian Affairs (BIA) since they assumed management from the Bureau of Reclamation in 1993. It has 17 reservoirs, 1,300 miles (2,100 km) of canals and more than 10,000 structures. After seven years of technical work on issues that included rights-of-ways, treaty-protected fisheries, biological resources, wildlife habitat and Native American traditional and cultural properties and resources, the Flathead Indian Irrigation Project Cooperative Management Entity was formed in 2010. The cooperative was the result of negotiations between the Flathead Joint Board of Control which represents non-Indian irrigation interests in the Flathead, Mission and Jocko Valley irrigation districts and the tribes. While the federal government would retain ownership, this was the first management partnership where management was taken over from the BIA on an irrigation project. Under the Cooperative, some of the irrigators were concerned that the tribes had equal representation as non-tribal farmers and ranchers, who they claim own 90 percent of the project's irrigable land. The use of the irrigation project by both Tribal and non-tribal members also complicated the nearly 2-decades-long-statewide effort to negotiate water rights settlements with all of Montana's tribes. The 2013 Montana Legislature failed to pass the Flathead Water Rights Compact after 12 years of negotiations with the tribes by the Montana Reserved Water Rights Compact Commission. In 2014, the BIA resumed management of the irrigation project. In 2015, the tribes acquired the dam, renaming it as the Seli'š Ksanka Qlispe' Dam. They are the first tribe to own a hydroelectric dam. It generates hydroelectric power for the region. The Confederated Salish and Kootenai Tribes – Montana Compact was ratified by the Tribes on December 29, 2020. This water rights compact with the state and federal government, with an effective date of September 17, 2021, established a regulatory body composed of members appointed by both the State of Montana and CSKT as the authority for all water right permitting and changes within the Flathead Indian Reservation in perpetuity. The Montana Water Rights Protection Act, passed by Congress to approve the compact, provided funding to rebuild the Flathead Irrigation Project.

Map of the Flathead Indian Reservation and nearby reservations (In light blue).

== Geography and ecology ==
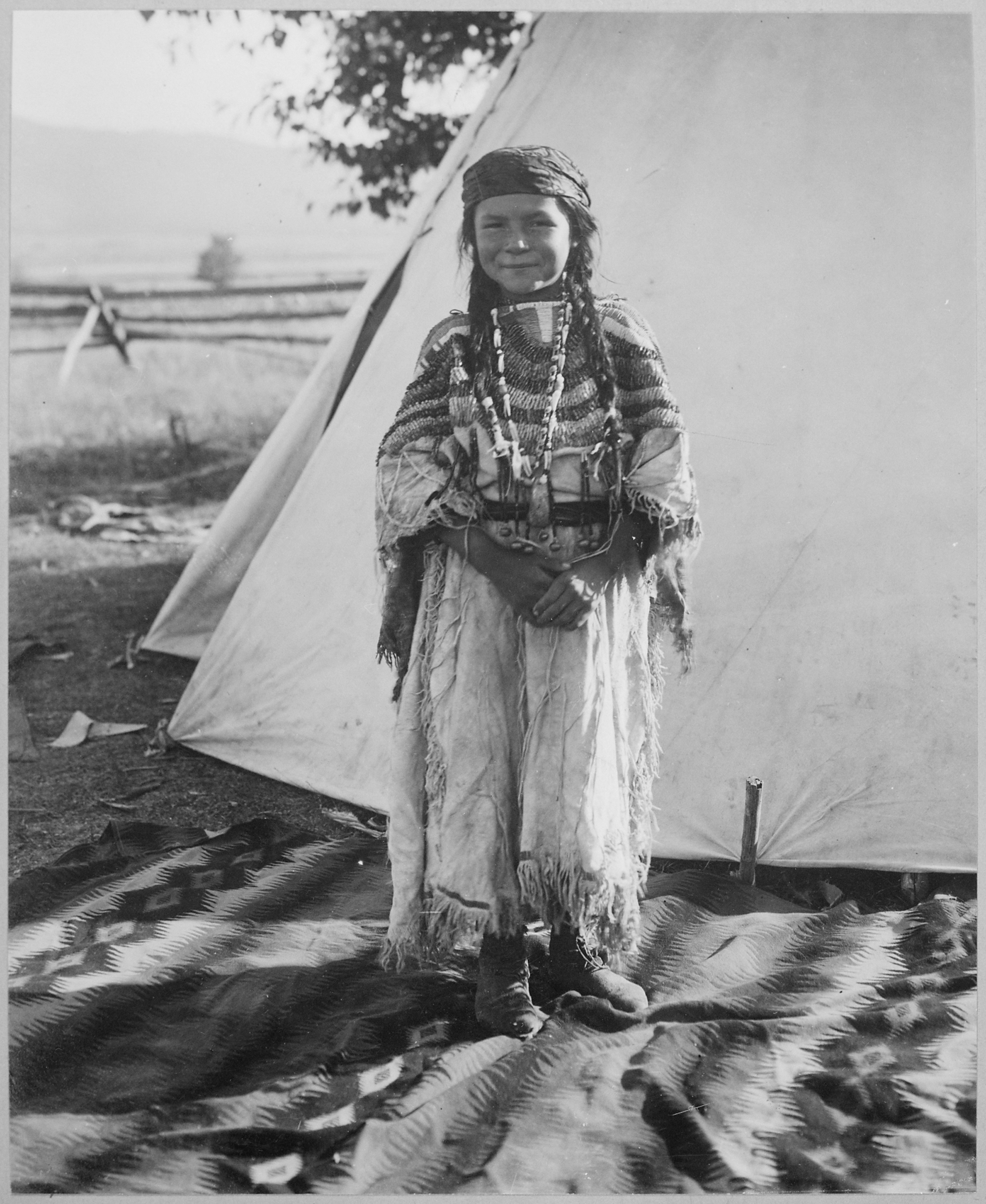
Angelic La Moose, 1913, on the Flathead Reservation, wearing traditional clothing made by her mother

All but the northern tip of Flathead Lake is part of the reservation. Flathead Lake lies in the northeast corner of the reservation, with most of the reservation to the south and west of the lake. Polson, the county seat of Lake County, is located at the southern end of the lake and within the reservation boundaries. The Flathead River flows south and west from Flathead Lake and exits in the southwestern corner of the reservation. Virtually all streams within the reservation are tributaries of the Flathead River. Mission Valley is centrally located within the reservation and surrounded on the eastern, western, and southern sides by mountain ranges.

Part of the Mission Mountains range is on the reservation. The western end of the range is protected by the Mission Mountains Tribal Wilderness and the eastern end of the range is protected by the Mission Mountains Wilderness. The southern end of the Mission Mountains includes a large grizzly bear protection area which is usually closed to hikers from July thru September. This allows the bears to feed on lady bugs and cut worms, and attempts to keep bear-human contact to a minimum.

The Natural Resource Department uses innovative management to restore and protect the habitat that supports a large variety of wildlife. The tribe prohibits hunting furbearing animals on the reservation. The tribe permits hunting by non-natives of the following birds: Hungarian partridge, pheasants, ducks, geese, mergansers, and coots. Other animals that can not be hunted by non-natives are: elk, white-tailed deer, mule deer, grizzly bear, and moose. Wolves, bison, swans, and falcons are also present.

Recent years have seen a decline in the numbers of native fish species, which include: bull trout, westslope cutthroat trout, northern whitefish, and northern pikeminnow. Non-native species include: yellowstone cutthroat trout, brook trout, rainbow trout, brown trout, lake trout, lake whitefish, black bullhead, kokanee salmon, yellow perch, northern pike, largemouth bass, and smallmouth bass.

=== Wildfires ===
At the beginning of August 2023, tribal, state and federal firefighters fought four lightning-sparked wildfires that burned more than 16,000 acres (6,500 ha).

== Demographics ==
The total population of the reservation was 28,324 as of the 2010 census, an 8% increase over the 2000 census. Some 9,138 persons living there identified as Native American; a total of 19,221 identified as other racial groups, outnumbering tribal members by 2:1. The largest community on the reservation is the city of Polson, which is also the county seat of Lake County. The seat of government of the Confederated Salish and Kootenai Tribes of the Flathead Nation is Pablo.

== Culture ==
Bison play an important role in Native culture which includes a deep spiritual connection. The federal government sponsored a program of bison eradication during the Indian Wars which removed a vital food source from the Plains Indians diet, and ensuring easier relocation onto Indian reservations. The National Bison Range was established on May 23, 1908, out of a portion of the reservation when it was realized that the Bison were almost extinct. The initial herd for the range, obtained from local ranchers, were the same animals (or their direct descendants) that had previously flourished on the reservation after being gathered by tribal members. After more than a century of federal management and nearly two decades of negotiations with the U.S. Fish and Wildlife Service, the site was restored to the tribes in 2022. U.S. Department of the Interior Assistant Secretary Tara Katuk Sweeney stated that "The CSKT have strong and deep historical, geographic and cultural ties to the land and the bison, and their environmental professionals have been leaders in natural resources and wildlife management for many decades."

The tribe is teaching members to raise traditional vegetables with at least eight gardens on the reservation. Some of the vegetables are used in a soup that is delivered to tribal elders.

== Economy ==
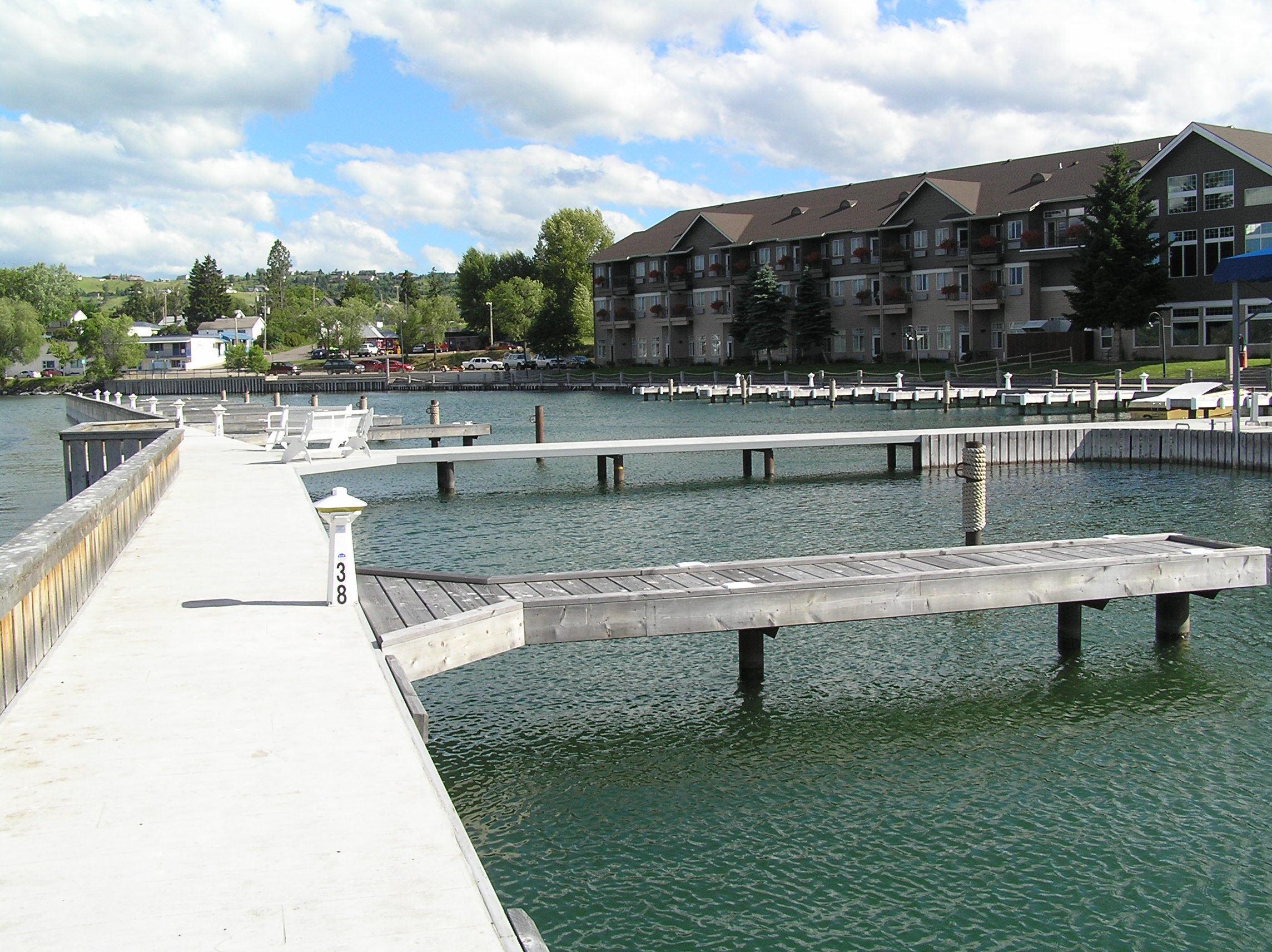
KwaTaqNuk resort, Polson

The tribes derive income from selling timber and from operating a variety of businesses:

- Gray Wolf Peak casino in the south of the reservation between Arlee and Evaro,
- KwaTaqNuk ("where the water leaves the lake") resort and casino in Polson,
- S&K Technologies, a defense technology firm with its headquarters in St. Ignatius and five subsidiary companies in the US and Saudi Arabia,
- S&K Electronics in Pablo, an electronics manufacturer established in 1984,
- S&K Holding, a leasing and financing firm,
- Salish Kootenai College, a tribally controlled college, has been established in Pablo. It offers two- and four-year degrees.

== Infrastructure ==
=== Power ===
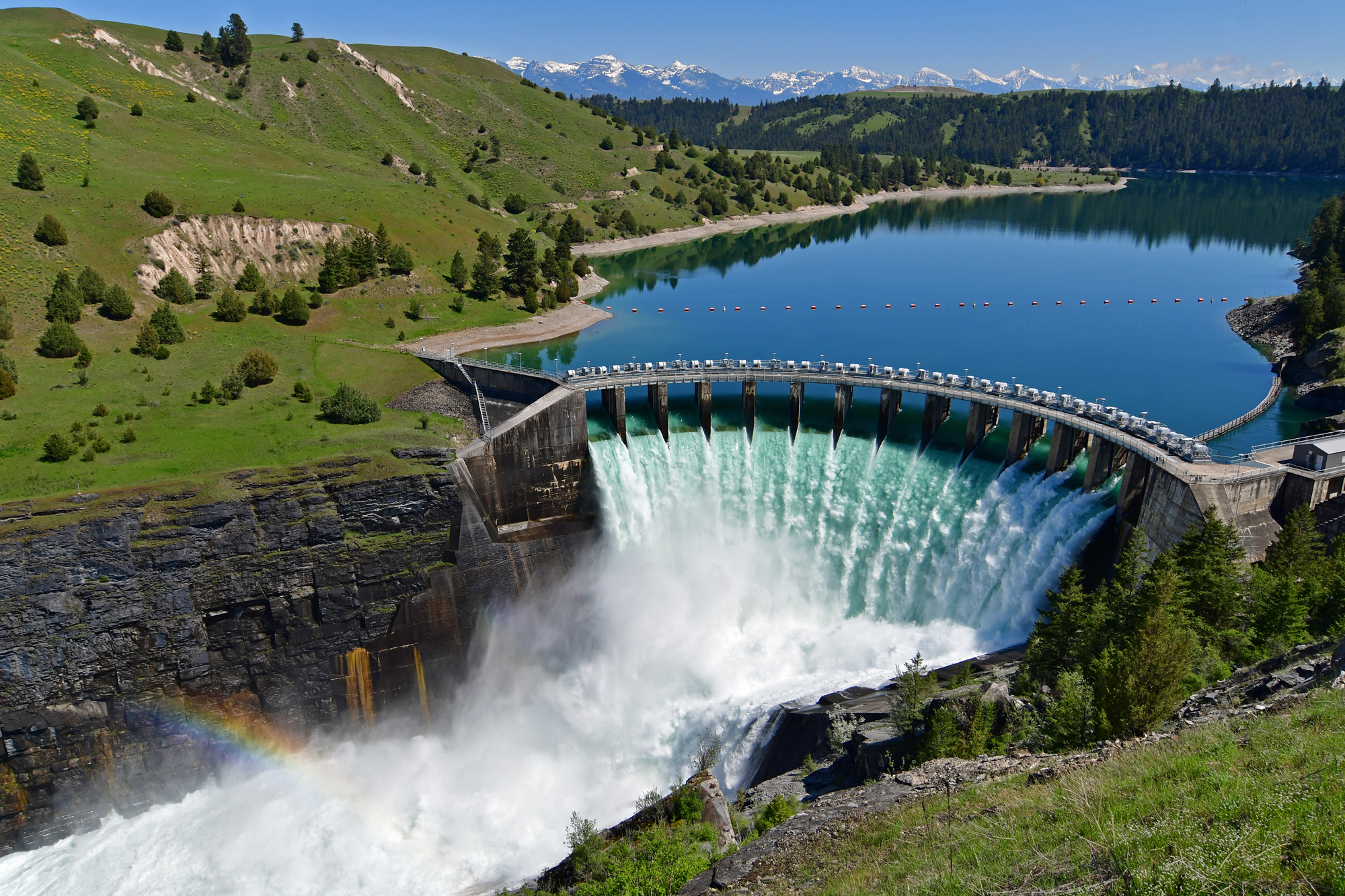
Séliš Ksanka Ql'ispé Dam in 2018

Mission Valley Power Company serves the reservation. The Confederated Salish and Kootenai Tribes of the Flathead Reservation operate and maintain Mission Valley Power, a federally owned electricity provider.

The Seli'š Ksanka Qlispe' Dam, (formerly Kerr Dam, generates hydroelectric power for the region.

=== Transportation ===
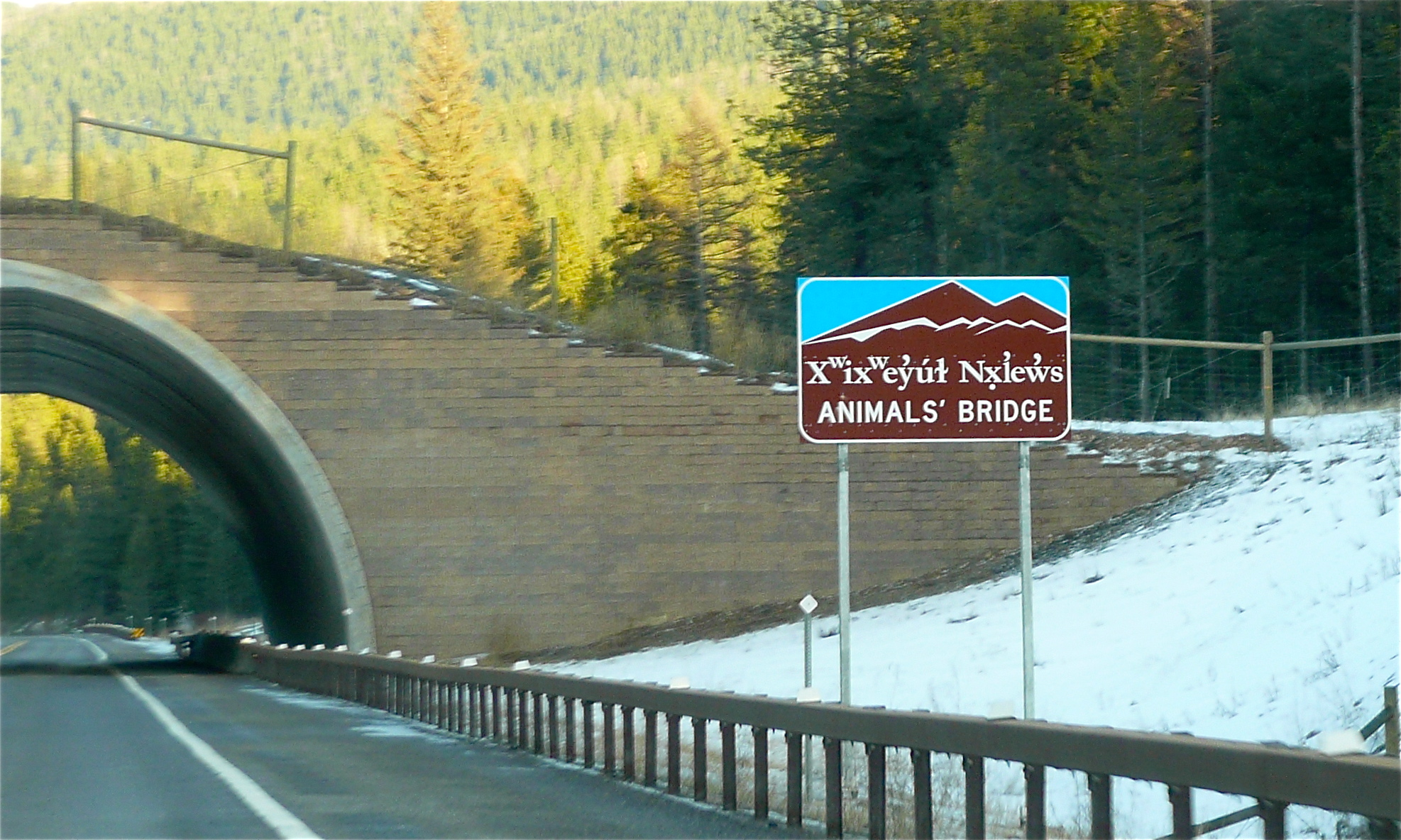
"Animals' Trail", wildlife crossing

U.S. Highway 93 is a busy route passing through the reservation with Missoula to the south and Glacier National Park and the Whitefish Mountain Resort to the north. Much of the heavily used route for commercial, recreational, and local traffic was undergoing a significant widening project. In 1997, the tribes entered negotiations with the Montana Department of Transportation over improvements to the 56-mile section (90 km) through the reservation as the tribes were concerned that project would destroy wetlands, further fragment wildlife habitat, and kill more animals crossing the highway. With concern for the nearby designated wilderness and grizzly bear habitat in the Mission Mountains, an agreement with the state and the Federal Highway Administration was reached in December 2000. While the passing lanes, turning lanes, climbing lanes, and wider shoulders were intended to cut down on accidents, the project also included 41 fish and wildlife crossings with the most visible being "Animals' Trail", a 197-foot wide vegetated bridge (60 m).

== Points of interest ==
- Flathead Indian Museum, St. Ignatius
- Flathead Lake State Park
- The Garden of One Thousand Buddhas
- Kicking Horse Reservoir
- Mission Mountains Tribal Wilderness
- Ninepipe National Wildlife Refuge and State Wildlife Management Area
- St. Ignatius Mission, St. Ignatius
- The People's Center, Pablo

== Communities ==
There are 26 places (including CDPs) on the reservation that are officially recognized by the Census Bureau. Only eight of them are majority Flathead. After the allotment and homesteading at the turn of the 20th century, white settlers gained ownership to about one-half of the land on the reservation. Since the late 20th century, the tribe has been steadily buying back the land over many years. The Flathead own about 2/3 of the land on the reservation.

- Arlee
- Bear Dance (part)
- Big Arm
- Camas
- Charlo
- Dayton
- Elmo
- Evaro
- Finley Point
- Hot Springs
- Jette
- Kerr
- Kicking Horse
- Kings Point
- Lindisfarne
- Lonepine
- Niarada
- Old Agency
- Pablo
- Polson
- Ravalli
- Rocky Point
- Ronan
- Sčilíp
- St. Ignatius
- Turtle Lake

== See also ==
- Jocko Valley
