= National Register of Historic Places listings in Lake County, Montana =

Location of Lake County in Montana

This is a list of the National Register of Historic Places listings in Lake County, Montana. It is intended to be a complete list of the properties and districts on the National Register of Historic Places in Lake County, Montana, United States. The locations of National Register properties and districts for which the latitude and longitude coordinates are included below, may be seen in a map.

There are 10 properties and districts listed on the National Register in the county.

This National Park Service list is complete through NPS recent listings posted October 16, 2026.

== Listings county-wide ==
	Name on the Register	Image	Date listed	Location	City or town	Description
1	Big Arm School	Big Arm School	August 16, 2007 (#07000816)	7th and D Sts. 47°47′48″N 114°17′41″W	Big Arm	
2	Dayton State Bank	Dayton State Bank	October 3, 2012 (#12000829)	133 C St. 47°51′52″N 114°16′40″W	Dayton	
3	Fort Connah Site	Fort Connah Site	April 28, 1982 (#82003173)	U.S. Route 93; 47°24′20″N 114°05′14″W	Post Creek	
4	Kootenai Lodge Historic District		January 17, 1984 (#84002476)	Sunburst Dr. 48°01′16″N 113°58′33″W	Bigfork	
5	Frank Bird Linderman House	Frank Bird Linderman House	February 22, 1984 (#84002479)	Address restricted	Lakeside	Lodge of writer and politician Frank Bird Linderman.
6	Don E. Olsson House and Garage	Don E. Olsson House and Garage	January 15, 2009 (#08001325)	503 4th Ave. SW. 47°31′29″N 114°06′11″W	Ronan	
7	Polson Feed Mill	Polson Feed Mill	April 29, 1980 (#80002423)	501 Main St. 47°41′28″N 114°09′44″W	Polson	Demolished.
8	St. Ignatius Mission	St. Ignatius Mission	June 19, 1973 (#73001053)	About 0.1 miles (0.16 km) southeast of U.S. Route 93 in St. Ignatius; 47°18′54″N 114°06′07″W	St. Ignatius	
9	St. Joseph's Catholic Church	St. Joseph's Catholic Church	March 18, 1999 (#99000345)	D'Aste Townsite; 47°23′07″N 114°11′47″W	Moiese	
10	Swan Lake Rock House Historic District		August 1, 1984 (#84002485)	Off Montana Highway 83; 47°57′18″N 113°53′33″W	Swan Lake	

== See also ==
- List of National Historic Landmarks in Montana
- National Register of Historic Places listings in Montana
