= List of lakes of Lake County, Montana =

There are at least 80 named lakes and reservoirs in Lake County, Montana.

== Lakes ==
- Ashley Lakes, 47°22′38″N 113°57′48″W, el. 5,354 feet (1,632 m)
- Black Lake, 47°51′50″N 114°19′26″W, el. 3,235 feet (986 m)
- Blacktail Lake, 47°16′17″N 113°51′07″W, el. 6,798 feet (2,072 m)
- Bond Lake, 47°56′10″N 113°44′11″W, el. 5,440 feet (1,660 m)
- Cat Lake, 47°37′32″N 113°39′57″W, el. 6,706 feet (2,044 m)
- Cedar Lake, 47°39′32″N 113°56′48″W, el. 6,503 feet (1,982 m)
- Cliff Lake, 47°22′45″N 113°53′03″W, el. 6,775 feet (2,065 m)
- Courville Lake, 47°36′00″N 113°59′35″W, el. 6,286 feet (1,916 m)
- Crow Creek Lakes, 47°30′33″N 113°56′38″W, el. 6,273 feet (1,912 m)
- Disappointment Lake, 47°23′09″N 113°53′06″W, el. 6,729 feet (2,051 m)
- Dry Lake, 47°39′24″N 113°47′13″W, el. 3,576 feet (1,090 m)
- Dry Lake, 47°17′58″N 113°52′46″W, el. 7,395 feet (2,254 m)
- Ducharm Lake, 47°37′22″N 113°56′45″W, el. 6,466 feet (1,971 m)
- Duncan Lake, 47°22′35″N 113°56′09″W, el. 7,484 feet (2,281 m)
- Estes Lake, 48°00′24″N 114°01′49″W, el. 3,533 feet (1,077 m)
- Fatty Lake, 47°41′43″N 113°55′57″W, el. 5,896 feet (1,797 m)
- First Lake, 47°23′39″N 113°53′28″W, el. 6,316 feet (1,925 m)
- Flathead Lake, 47°53′15″N 114°07′03″W, el. 2,897 feet (883 m)
- Frog Lakes, 47°26′22″N 113°55′05″W, el. 6,181 feet (1,884 m)
- Hall Lake, 47°58′26″N 113°48′39″W, el. 5,279 feet (1,609 m)
- Horseshoe Lake, 48°01′11″N 113°59′32″W, el. 3,100 feet (940 m)
- Icefloe Lake, 47°22′11″N 113°54′23″W, el. 7,470 feet (2,280 m)
- Jette Lake, 47°45′35″N 114°15′01″W, el. 3,589 feet (1,094 m)
- Lake Mary Ronan, 47°55′36″N 114°23′57″W, el. 3,704 feet (1,129 m)
- Lake of the Clouds, 47°21′57″N 113°53′34″W, el. 7,753 feet (2,363 m)
- Lake of the Stars, 47°19′50″N 113°53′36″W, el. 7,618 feet (2,322 m)
- Long Lake, 47°25′59″N 113°54′19″W, el. 5,958 feet (1,816 m)
- Loon Lake, 48°01′24″N 113°59′20″W, el. 3,074 feet (937 m)
- Loon Lake, 47°44′43″N 114°19′08″W, el. 3,451 feet (1,052 m)
- Lost Lake, 47°40′24″N 114°03′58″W, el. 3,074 feet (937 m)
- Lower Riddell Lake, 47°16′21″N 113°52′17″W, el. 7,119 feet (2,170 m)
- Lucifer Lake, 47°20′31″N 113°55′13″W, el. 6,270 feet (1,910 m)
- McDonald Lake, 47°25′17″N 113°58′35″W, el. 3,599 feet (1,097 m)
- Metcalf Lake, 47°45′26″N 113°50′30″W, el. 3,235 feet (986 m)
- Mikes Pond, 47°53′05″N 114°17′59″W, el. 3,104 feet (946 m)
- Moon Lake, 47°25′28″N 113°54′26″W, el. 5,738 feet (1,749 m)
- Moore Lake, 47°37′15″N 113°53′06″W, el. 5,810 feet (1,770 m)
- Mud Lake, 47°37′02″N 113°59′45″W, el. 5,794 feet (1,766 m)
- No Fish Lake, 47°17′35″N 113°52′49″W, el. 7,251 feet (2,210 m)
- Peck Lake, 47°37′08″N 113°48′26″W, el. 3,510 feet (1,070 m)
- Picture Lake, 47°20′31″N 113°54′22″W, el. 6,673 feet (2,034 m)
- Piper Lake, 47°37′34″N 113°56′02″W, el. 6,296 feet (1,919 m)
- Pony Lake, 47°38′15″N 113°40′11″W, el. 6,545 feet (1,995 m)
- Rainbow Lake, 47°40′53″N 113°57′11″W, el. 6,575 feet (2,004 m)
- Ravalli Potholes, 47°17′44″N 114°09′50″W, el. 3,113 feet (949 m)
- Red Lake, 47°52′51″N 114°19′52″W, el. 3,258 feet (993 m)
- Row Lake, 47°53′53″N 114°16′06″W, el. 4,006 feet (1,221 m)
- Scenic Lakes, 47°16′53″N 113°51′50″W, el. 7,352 feet (2,241 m)
- Scout Lake, 47°45′13″N 113°42′22″W, el. 5,449 feet (1,661 m)
- Seeley Lake
- Shay Lake, 47°41′29″N 113°50′09″W, el. 3,481 feet (1,061 m)
- Skags Lake, 47°54′20″N 114°17′06″W, el. 3,934 feet (1,199 m)
- Sloan Lake, 47°32′18″N 114°10′53″W, el. 3,064 feet (934 m)
- Sonielem Lake, 47°19′09″N 113°55′53″W, el. 6,945 feet (2,117 m)
- Summit Lake, 47°26′45″N 113°55′49″W, el. 6,319 feet (1,926 m)
- Swan Lake, 47°57′32″N 113°53′41″W, el. 3,071 feet (936 m)
- Swartz Lake, 47°30′09″N 113°59′43″W, el. 3,930 feet (1,200 m)
- Terrace Lake, 47°31′31″N 113°56′14″W, el. 6,594 feet (2,010 m)
- Trinkus Lake, 47°56′45″N 113°44′52″W, el. 6,066 feet (1,849 m)
- Twin Lakes, 47°14′37″N 113°54′49″W, el. 4,140 feet (1,260 m)
- Upper Riddell Lake, 47°16′40″N 113°52′23″W, el. 7,277 feet (2,218 m)
- Van Lake, 47°42′03″N 113°46′10″W, el. 3,642 feet (1,110 m)
- Webb Lake, 47°56′19″N 114°22′15″W, el. 3,989 feet (1,216 m)
- Weed Lake, 47°58′02″N 113°52′29″W, el. 4,393 feet (1,339 m)
- Wymore Lake, 47°47′12″N 114°10′16″W, el. 2,897 feet (883 m)

== Reservoirs ==
- Crow Reservoir, 47°30′12″N 114°13′45″W, el. 2,867 feet (874 m)
- Flathead Lake, 47°40′36″N 114°14′03″W, el. 2,900 feet (880 m)
- Hellroaring Reservoir, 47°42′30″N 114°00′57″W, el. 3,773 feet (1,150 m)
- Hillside Reservoir, 47°24′15″N 114°15′14″W, el. 2,743 feet (836 m)
- Horte Reservoir, 47°32′17″N 114°16′14″W, el. 3,038 feet (926 m)
- Kicking Horse Dam, 47°27′14″N 114°04′39″W, el. 3,064 feet (934 m)
- Lower Crow Reservoir, 47°30′10″N 114°13′42″W, el. 2,871 feet (875 m)
- McDonald Lake, 47°25′36″N 113°59′33″W, el. 3,596 feet (1,096 m)
- Mission Reservoir, 47°18′52″N 114°01′11″W, el. 3,412 feet (1,040 m)
- Ninepipe Reservoir, 47°27′19″N 114°08′13″W, el. 3,015 feet (919 m)
- Pablo Reservoir, 47°39′18″N 114°08′45″W, el. 3,205 feet (977 m)
- Pablo Reservoir, 47°38′20″N 114°08′31″W, el. 3,235 feet (986 m)
- Saint Marys Lake, 47°15′35″N 113°55′48″W, el. 4,016 feet (1,224 m)
- Saint Marys Lake, 47°15′54″N 113°55′51″W, el. 4,016 feet (1,224 m)
- Turtle Lake, 47°40′06″N 114°04′34″W, el. 3,097 feet (944 m)

== See also ==
- List of lakes in Montana
