= List of the oldest buildings in Montana =

This article lists the oldest extant buildings in Montana, including extant buildings and structures constructed prior to and during the United States rule over Montana. Only buildings built prior to 1870 are suitable for inclusion on this list, or the building must be the oldest of its type.

In order to qualify for the list, a structure must:

- be a recognizable building (defined as any human-made structure used or intended for supporting or sheltering any use or continuous occupancy);
- incorporate features of building work from the claimed date to at least 1.5 metres (4.9 ft) in height and/or be a listed building.

This consciously excludes ruins of limited height, roads and statues. Bridges may be included if they otherwise fulfill the above criteria. Dates for many of the oldest structures have been arrived at by radiocarbon dating or dendrochronology and should be considered approximate. If the exact year of initial construction is estimated, it will be shown as a range of dates.

== List of oldest buildings ==
Building	Image	Location	First built	Use	Notes
Fort Connah Site		between St. Ignatius and Charlo, Montana	1846	Trading post	Oldest surviving building in Montana; Built of logs.
Robber's Roost		Alder, Montana	1863	Residence	Log house; Listed on National Register of Historic Places
Dr. Don L. Byam House		Nevada City, Montana	1863	Residence	Listed on NRHP
Stonewall Hall		Virginia City, Montana	1864	Government	"hosted the Territorial Legislature between 1865 and 1875"
Virginia City Opera House		Virginia City, Montana	1864	Stable/Opera House	Began as a stone stable
Fenney House		Nevada City, Montana	1864	Residence	Listed on NRHP
Glover Cabin		Anaconda, Montana	1865	Residence	
Pioneer Cabin and Caretaker’s House		Helena, Montana	1864-1865	Residence	Likely oldest house in Helena, MT
St. Mary's Mission (Montana)		Stevensville, Montana	1866	Church	Oldest church building in Montana
I.G. Baker House		Fort Benton, Montana	1867	Residence	
Union League of America Hall		White Sulphur Springs, Montana	1867	Hall	Men's Club, and later a church
Fort Logan and Blockhouse		White Sulphur Springs, Montana	ca. 1870	Fort	

== See also ==
- National Register of Historic Places listings in Montana
- History of Montana
- List of the oldest buildings in the United States
