= Kicking Horse =

Kicking Horse may refer to:

- Kicking Horse River in the Canadian Rockies, southeastern British Columbia, Canada
  - Kicking Horse Resort, a ski resort
- Kicking Horse Pass, in the Canadian Rockies
- Kicking Horse, Montana, United States, a census-designated place in Lake County
- Kicking Horse Dam and Reservoir, in Lake County
- The Kicking Horse coffee brand in Canada, now owned by Lavazza
