= Dayton State Bank =

- U.S. National Register of Historic Places
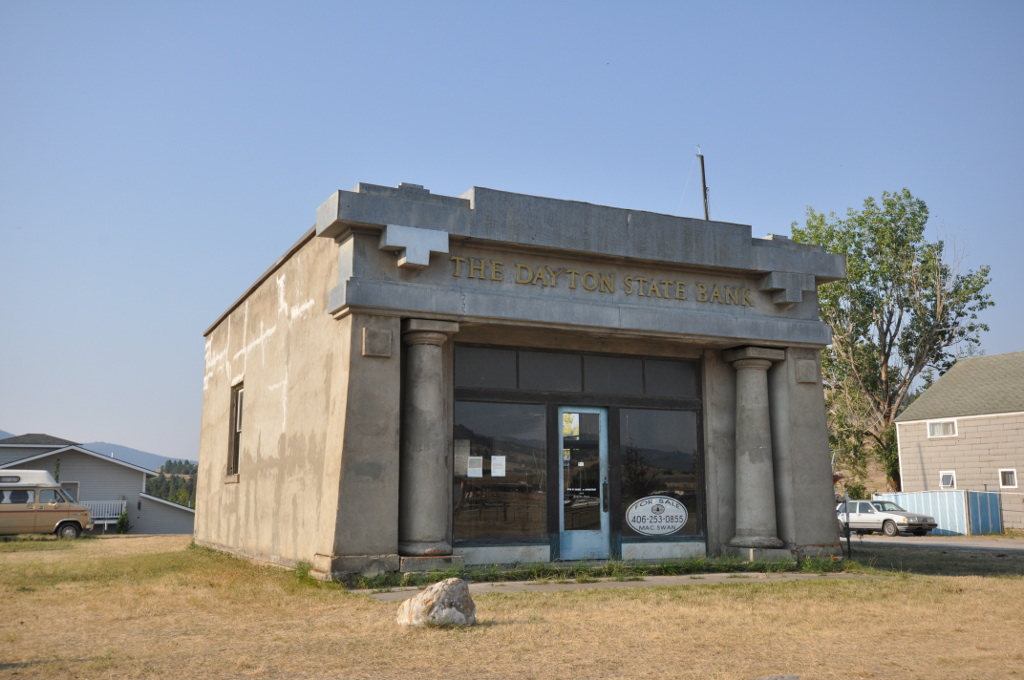

- Location within Montana Location within the United States
- Location: 133 C St., Dayton, Montana
- Coordinates: 47.864363°N 114.277794°W
- Area: less than one acre
- Built: 1912
- NRHP reference No.: 12000829
- Added to NRHP: October 3, 2012

The Dayton State Bank, at 133 C St. in Dayton in Lake County, Montana, was listed on the National Register of Historic Places in 2012. It was built in 1912 out of poured concrete and is 24 by 40 feet (7.3 m × 12.2 m) in plan. It is the only example of Egyptian Revival architectural style of its era known to be surviving in the state.
