= Swan Lake Rock House Historic District =

Historic district in Montana, United States

- U.S. National Register of Historic Places
- U.S. Historic district
- Location within Montana Location within the United States
- Location: Off Montana Highway 83, near Swan Lake, Montana
- Coordinates: 47°57′18″N 113°53′33″W
- Area: 1.4 acres (0.57 ha)
- Built: 1929-30
- Built by: William Moose, Art Whitney
- Architect: Martha Evans
- NRHP reference No.: 84002485
- Added to NRHP: August 1, 1984

The Swan Lake Rock House Historic District is a historic district listed on the National Register of Historic Places located southeast of Boulder, Montana. It was added to the Register on August 1, 1984. It includes Evans' Rock House. It is located on what is known as Three Rock Point on the western side of Swan Lake in Lake County, Montana.

It includes five contributing buildings built in 1930.

It is related to the Kootenai Lodge Historic District.
