= Big Arm State Park =

Park in Montana, USA

- Location within Montana
- Location: Lake County, Montana, United States
- Nearest town: Big Arm, Montana
- Coordinates: 47°48′47″N 114°18′36″W
- Area: 217 acres (88 ha)
- Elevation: 2,943 ft (897 m)
- Designation: Montana state park
- Established: 1966
- Administrator: Montana Fish, Wildlife & Parks
- Website: Big Arm State Park

Big Arm State Park is a Montana state park that is a unit of Flathead Lake State Park near Big Arm, Montana. Big Arm State Park is located on the western shores of Flathead Lake, the largest natural freshwater lake in the western United States. The park's recreational activities include fishing, boating, RV and tent camping, and swimming.
