= Proctor, Montana =

- Unincorporated community
- Location within Montana Location within the United States
- Coordinates: 47°53′33″N 114°18′19″W
- Country: United States
- State: Montana
- County: Lake
- Elevation: 3,166 ft (965 m)
- Time zone: UTC-7 (Mountain (MST))
  - Summer (DST): UTC-6 (MDT)
- ZIP code: 59929
- Area code: 406
- GNIS feature ID: 789200

Proctor is an unincorporated community in Lake County, Montana, United States. Proctor is 2.2 miles (3.5 km) northwest of Dayton. The community has a ZIP code 59929.

It is near Skags Lake.

== History ==
In 1869, Kootenai settlement began in the Proctor area, and a federal commissary opened there. Clarence E. Proctor, for whom the community is named, founded a ranch and opened a store at Proctor in 1883. The town was known as Dayton until 1910, when many of the town's residents relocated to the current site of Dayton due to its shorefront location on Flathead Lake; the old townsite then acquired its current name.
