= Pablo National Wildlife Refuge =

- IUCN category IV (habitat/species management area)
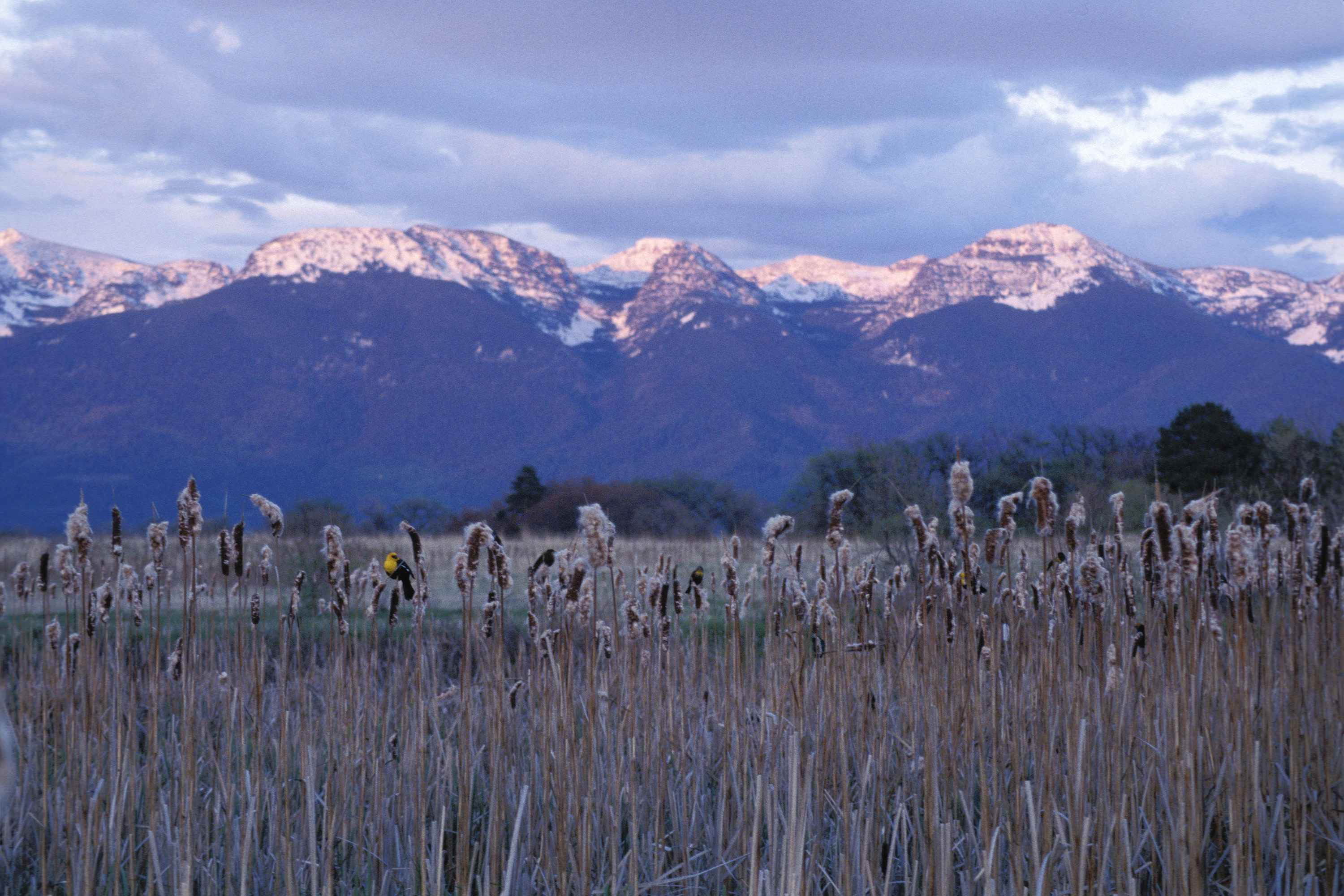

- Location within the United States
- Location: Lake County, Montana, United States
- Nearest city: Polson, MT
- Coordinates: 47°38′12″N 114°09′32″W
- Area: 2,473 acres (10.01 km^{2})
- Established: 1921
- Governing body: U.S. Fish and Wildlife Service
- Website: Official website

Pablo National Wildlife Refuge is a National Wildlife Refuge of the United States located in northwestern Montana. It is a unit of the National Bison Range Complex of refuges. It is within the Flathead Indian Reservation (known as the Tribal Trust Lands of the Confederated Salish and Kootenai Tribes), about 2 mi (3.2 km) south of Polson.

== Description ==
Most of the 2,473-acre (1,001 ha) refuge is part of a reservoir, with 692 acres (280 ha) of exposed land surrounding it.

The refuge is nesting habitat for numerous bird species such as the green-winged teal, Canada goose, bittern, and great blue heron. At least one pair of nesting bald eagles produce offspring each year. in 1996, 19 trumpeter swans were released in an effort to establish a breeding flock in the region which appears to have been a success. Small mammals commonly found include muskrat, porcupine, badger and skunk. The reservoir contains yellow perch and largemouth bass.

The refuge is located immediately west of U.S. Highway 93. It is not permanently staffed and has no improvements. It is managed as an easement and the federal jurisdiction pertains solely to species and habitat protection.

== See also ==
- Bison herds
- National Wildlife Refuges in Montana
