= Rollins, Montana =

- Census-designated place
- Location of Rollins, Montana
- Coordinates: 47°54′38″N 114°11′42″W
- Country: United States
- State: Montana
- County: Lake

Area
  - Total: 2.87 sq mi (7.44 km^{2})
  - Land: 2.87 sq mi (7.44 km^{2})
  - Water: 0 sq mi (0.00 km^{2})
- Elevation: 3,005 ft (916 m)

Population (2020)
  - Total: 192
  - Density: 67/sq mi (25.8/km^{2})
- Time zone: UTC-7 (Mountain (MST))
  - Summer (DST): UTC-6 (MDT)
- ZIP code: 59931
- Area code: 406
- FIPS code: 30-64075
- GNIS feature ID: 2409203

Rollins is an unincorporated community and census-designated place (CDP) in Lake County, Montana, United States. As of the 2020 census, Rollins had a population of 192.

The community began in the 1880s as Bay View. It was renamed when the post office was opened in 1904.

== Geography ==
The town is just north of the Flathead Indian Reservation on the west shore of Flathead Lake.

Rollins is located in northern Lake County along the west side of Flathead Lake. Topographic features along the lakeshore of Rollins include, from south to north, Crescent Bay, Canal Bay, Sessions Point, Deweys Bay, Bennetts Bay, Hyde Bay, Zelezny Bay, and Painted Rocks.

U.S. Route 93 runs through Rollins, leading north 23 miles (37 km) to Kalispell and south 28 miles (45 km) to Polson, the Lake county seat.

According to the United States Census Bureau, the Rollins CDP has a total area of 2.9 square miles (7.5 km^{2}), all land.

=== Climate ===
This climatic region is typified by large seasonal temperature differences, with warm to hot (and often humid) summers and cold (sometimes severely cold) winters. According to the Köppen Climate Classification system, Rollins has a humid continental climate, abbreviated "Dfb" on climate maps.

== Demographics ==
Historical population
Census	Pop.	Note	%±
2020	192		—
U.S. Decennial Census

As of the census of 2000, there were 183 people, 83 households, and 60 families residing in the CDP. The population density was 62.5 inhabitants per square mile (24.1/km^{2}). There were 218 housing units at an average density of 74.5 per square mile (28.8/km^{2}). The racial makeup of the CDP was 98.36% White, 0.55% Native American, and 1.09% from two or more races.

There were 83 households, out of which 14.5% had children under the age of 18 living with them, 71.1% were married couples living together, 1.2% had a female householder with no spouse present, and 27.7% were non-families. 26.5% of all households were made up of individuals, and 13.3% had someone living alone who was 65 years of age or older. The average household size was 2.20 and the average family size was 2.62.

In the CDP, the population was spread out, with 15.3% under the age of 18, 3.8% from 18 to 24, 13.7% from 25 to 44, 34.4% from 45 to 64, and 32.8% who were 65 years of age or older. The median age was 54 years. For every 100 females, there were 98.9 males. For every 100 females age 18 and over, there were 96.2 males.

The median income for a household in the CDP was $31,875, and the median income for a family was $34,821. Males had a median income of $19,583 versus $33,750 for females. The per capita income for the CDP was $27,255. About 7.5% of families and 7.2% of the population were below the poverty line, including none of those under the age of eighteen or sixty five or over.
