= Lake Mary Ronan, Montana =

- Census-designated place
- Location within Montana Location within the United States
- Coordinates: 47°55′54″N 114°22′53″W
- Country: United States
- State: Montana
- County: Lake

Area
  - Total: 1.05 sq mi (2.72 km^{2})
  - Land: 1.05 sq mi (2.72 km^{2})
  - Water: 0 sq mi (0.00 km^{2})
- Elevation: 3,747 ft (1,142 m)

Population (2020)
  - Total: 53
  - Density: 51/sq mi (19.5/km^{2})
- Time zone: UTC-7 (Mountain (MST))
  - Summer (DST): UTC-6 (MDT)
- Area code: 406
- FIPS code: 30-41910
- GNIS feature ID: 2583821

Lake Mary Ronan is a census-designated place (CDP) in Lake County, Montana, United States. As of the 2020 census, Lake Mary Ronan had a population of 53. The CDP is in northwestern Lake County, along the northern and eastern shores of Lake Mary Ronan, and includes the populated places of Lake Mary Ronan, Melton, and Sipes, as well as Lake Mary Ronan State Park. It is 8 miles (13 km) northwest of U.S. Route 93 at Dayton, and 30 miles (48 km) northwest of Polson, the Lake county seat.

According to the U.S. Census Bureau, the CDP has an area of 1.0 square mile (2.7 km^{2}), of which 0.44 acres (1,796 m^{2}), or 0.07%, are water.

== Demographics ==
Historical population
Census	Pop.	Note	%±
2020	53		—
U.S. Decennial Census
