= Bear Dance, Montana =

- Census-designated place
- Location within Montana Location within the United States
- Coordinates: 47°53′10″N 114°01′37″W
- Country: United States
- State: Montana
- County: Lake

Area
  - Total: 2.78 sq mi (7.19 km^{2})
  - Land: 2.78 sq mi (7.19 km^{2})
  - Water: 0 sq mi (0.00 km^{2})
- Elevation: 3,110 ft (950 m)

Population (2020)
  - Total: 281
  - Density: 101.2/sq mi (39.09/km^{2})
- Time zone: UTC-7 (Mountain (MST))
  - Summer (DST): UTC-6 (MDT)
- Area code: 406
- FIPS code: 30-04410
- GNIS feature ID: 2583788

Bear Dance is a census-designated place (CDP) in Lake County, Montana, United States. The population was 275 at the United States 2010 census, and was 281 at the 2020 census. It is located on Montana Highway 35 on the east bank of Flathead Lake, 22 miles northeast from Polson, and 11 miles south from Bigfork.

== Climate ==
Moderated by Flathead Lake, Bear Dance features a warm summer humid continental climate (Köppen Dfb) with short summers, running approximately from mid-June to early September, and cold snowy winters. Being part of the Western Canadian Rockies ecoregion, it is typified by a larger diurnal temperature range than one would expect within the same climate type in the lowlands. Bear Dance is somewhat moister compared to nearby Kalispell. It lies along the fringe of USDA hardiness zones 6a and 6b.

Climate data for Bear Dance, MT (1991–2020 normals, 3156 ft a.s.l.)
Month	Jan	Feb	Mar	Apr	May	Jun	Jul	Aug	Sep	Oct	Nov	Dec	Year
Mean daily maximum °F (°C)	32.6 (0.3)	36.4 (2.4)	45.2 (7.3)	53.7 (12.1)	63.8 (17.7)	70.3 (21.3)	81.3 (27.4)	81.0 (27.2)	69.9 (21.1)	54.7 (12.6)	40.5 (4.7)	32.4 (0.2)	55.2 (12.9)
Daily mean °F (°C)	25.9 (−3.4)	27.9 (−2.3)	35.2 (1.8)	42.6 (5.9)	51.3 (10.7)	57.8 (14.3)	65.6 (18.7)	64.8 (18.2)	55.6 (13.1)	43.8 (6.6)	33.1 (0.6)	26.3 (−3.2)	44.2 (6.8)
Mean daily minimum °F (°C)	19.2 (−7.1)	19.5 (−6.9)	25.1 (−3.8)	31.5 (−0.3)	38.8 (3.8)	45.2 (7.3)	49.9 (9.9)	48.6 (9.2)	41.4 (5.2)	32.8 (0.4)	25.6 (−3.6)	20.2 (−6.6)	33.2 (0.7)
Average precipitation inches (mm)	1.78 (45)	1.11 (28)	1.68 (43)	2.14 (54)	2.74 (70)	3.51 (89)	1.47 (37)	1.16 (29)	1.96 (50)	1.95 (50)	1.97 (50)	1.74 (44)	23.2 (590)
Average dew point °F (°C)	20.2 (−6.6)	21.1 (−6.1)	25.2 (−3.8)	30.1 (−1.1)	37.0 (2.8)	43.7 (6.5)	44.7 (7.1)	43.4 (6.3)	39.7 (4.3)	33.2 (0.7)	26.3 (−3.2)	20.2 (−6.6)	32.1 (0.1)
Source: PRISM Climate Group

== Demographics ==
Historical population
Census	Pop.	Note	%±
2020	281		—
U.S. Decennial Census

As of 2020, Bear Dance had a population of 281 people, an increase of 6 people since 2010.
