= Lindisfarne, Montana =

- Census-designated place
- Location within Montana Location within the United States
- Coordinates: 47°48′27″N 114°14′02″W
- Country: United States
- State: Montana
- County: Lake

Area
  - Total: 3.40 sq mi (8.80 km^{2})
  - Land: 2.58 sq mi (6.68 km^{2})
  - Water: 0.82 sq mi (2.13 km^{2})
- Elevation: 3,297 ft (1,005 m)

Population (2020)
  - Total: 320
  - Density: 124.1/sq mi (47.92/km^{2})
- Time zone: UTC-7 (Mountain (MST))
  - Summer (DST): UTC-6 (MDT)
- Area code: 406
- FIPS code: 30-43710
- GNIS feature ID: 2583822

Lindisfarne is a census-designated place (CDP) in Lake County, Montana, United States. As of the 2020 census, Lindisfarne had a population of 320.

The community is in north-central Lake County, on the south shore of the Big Arm of Flathead Lake. It is bordered to the west by the community of Big Arm, and it extends to the east past White Swan Bay, White Swan Point, and Indian Bay to the west side of Matterhorn Point. Lindisfarne is 10 miles (16 km) north of Polson, the Lake county seat.

== Demographics ==
Historical population
Census	Pop.	Note	%±
2020	320		—
U.S. Decennial Census
