= Big Arm School =

- U.S. National Register of Historic Places
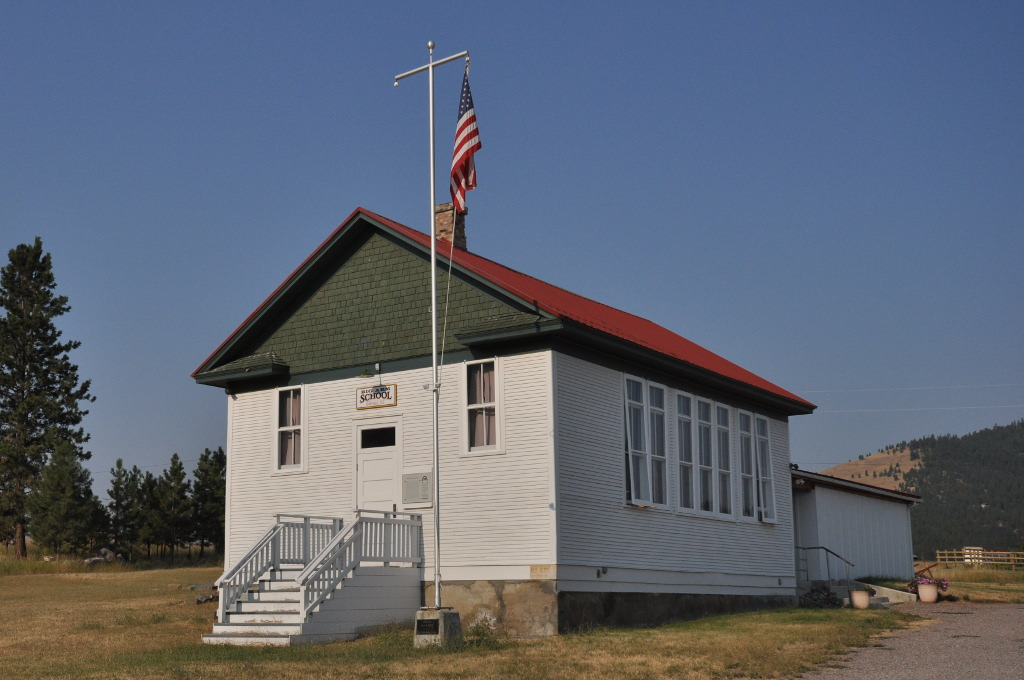

- Location within Montana Location within the United States
- Location: 7th and D Streets
- Coordinates: 47°47′48″N 114°17′41″W
- Area: 2.75 acres (1.11 ha)
- Built: c.1915
- NRHP reference No.: 07000816
- Added to NRHP: August 16, 2007

The Big Arm School is a site on the National Register of Historic Places located northwest of Polson, Montana. It was added to the Register on August 16, 2007.

It is a one-story, wood-frame, 36 by 24 feet (11.0 m × 7.3 m) school building which also served as a dance hall and a polling station and in other functions. It was built in the mid-1910s and served both Indian and non-Indian students for fifty years. Its first teacher was a Mr. Howe; another named M.P. Elder taught 33 students from 15 families in 1915–16. During 1944-45 there were just five students, taught by Marie Twitchel, including her brother.
