= Don E. Olsson House and Garage =

Historic house in Montana, United States

- U.S. National Register of Historic Places
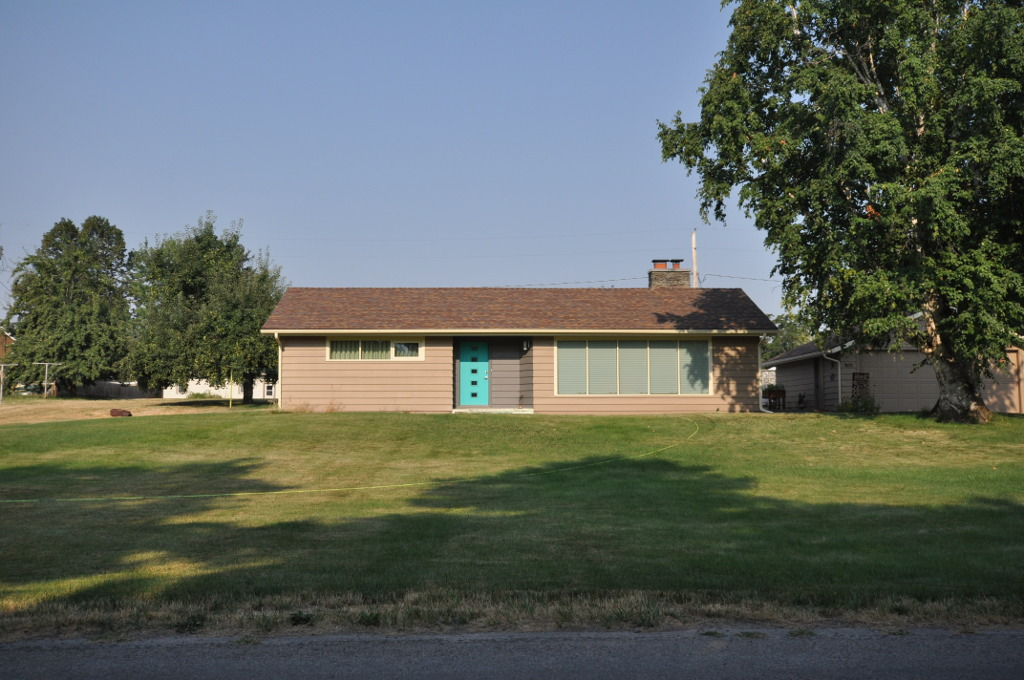

- Location within Montana Location within the United States
- Location: 503 4th Ave. SW., Ronan, Montana
- Coordinates: 47°31′40″N 114°06′01″W
- Area: less than one acre
- Built: 1950-51, 1954 (house), 1952 (garage)
- Architect: Thomas A. Balzhiser
- Architectural style: Modern Movement, Ranch style
- NRHP reference No.: 08001325
- Added to NRHP: January 15, 2009

The Don E. Olsson House and Garage is a site on the National Register of Historic Places located in Ronan, Montana. It was added to the Register on January 15, 2009.

It was deemed significant "for its mid-century modern residential architecture that represents an early example of the Ranch style in Ronan and Lake County when it was built in 1950-51". The house, its 1954 addition, and 1952 garage were designed by the architect Thomas Balzhiser (the brother-in-law of the house's owner), and as such the garage and addition share the same design features as the house. The house became a model for subsequent residential construction in Ronan such as the Harald Olsson House at 408 Eisenhower, also designed by Balzhiser.
