= Kicking Horse Dam =

Coordinates: 47°27′16″N 114°04′39″W

- Interactive map of Kicking Horse Dam
- Country: United States
- Location: Lake County, Montana
- Purpose: Multi-purpose
- Status: Operational
- Opening date: 1930
- Built by: Bureau of Indian Affairs (BIA)
- Owner: BIA
- Operator: BIA

Dam and spillways
- Type of dam: Earth fill dam
- Impounds: Dublin Gulch
- Height (foundation): 29 feet (8.8 m)
- Length: 5,220 feet (1,590 m)

Reservoir
- Creates: Kicking Horse Reservoir
- Total capacity: 8,350 acre-feet (10,300,000 m^{3})
- Surface area: 1.1 square miles (2.8 km^{2})

Kicking Horse Dam (National Inventory of Dams ID MT00594) is a dam in Lake County, Montana.

The earthen dam was constructed in 1930 by the United States Bureau of Indian Affairs, with a height of 29 feet (8.8 m) and 5,220 feet (1,590 m) long at its crest. It impounds Dublin Gulch for irrigation and recreation. The dam is owned and operated by the Bureau of Indian Affairs, while recreation is regulated by the tribal government and the Montana Department of Fish, Wildlife and Parks.

The dam is surrounded by the territory of the Flathead Indian Reservation (known as the Tribal Trust Lands of the Confederated Salish and Kootenai Tribes), is adjacent to the town of Kicking Horse, Montana (population 80) and adjacent to the Mission Mountains Wilderness. The reservoir it creates, Kicking Horse Reservoir, has a normal water surface of 1.1 square miles (2.8 km^{2}), and a maximum capacity of 8,350 acre-feet (10,300,000 m^{3}). Recreation includes fishing and bird hunting, subject to tribal regulations.

== In popular culture ==
American poet Richard Hugo references the dam and the adjacent town in his 1973 poem "The Lady in Kicking Horse Reservoir".
