= Piper Lake =

Lake in the state of South Dakota, United States

- Location within South Dakota
- Location: Beadle County, South Dakota
- Coordinates: 44°36′17″N 98°08′43″W
- Type: lake
- Basin countries: United States
- Surface elevation: 1,263 ft (385 m)

Piper Lake is a natural lake in South Dakota, in the United States.

Piper Lake has the name of Albert Piper, a pioneer who settled there.
