= Polson Feed Mill =

- U.S. National Register of Historic Places
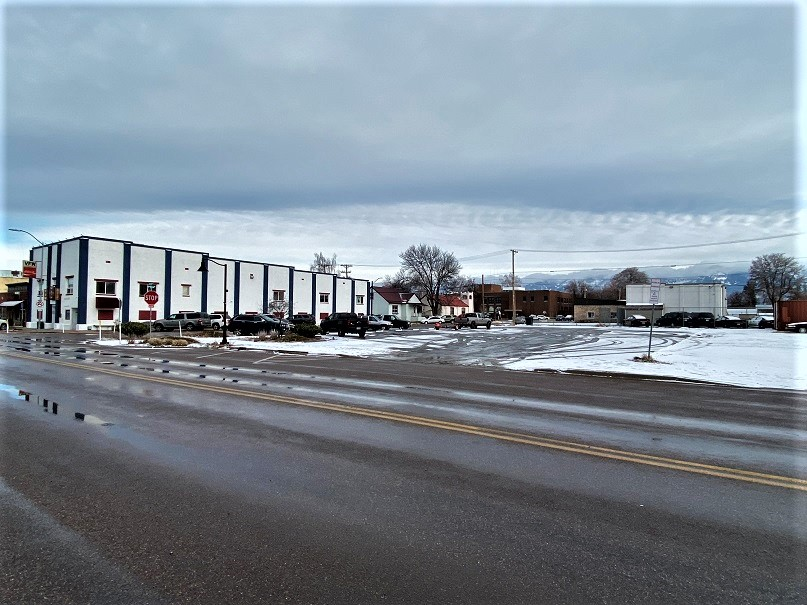

- Location within Montana Location within the United States
- Location: 501 Main St. Polson, Montana
- Coordinates: 47°41′28″N 114°9′44″W
- Area: less than one acre
- Built: 1910
- NRHP reference No.: 80002423
- Added to NRHP: April 29, 1980

The Polson Feed Mill is a site on the National Register of Historic Places located in Polson, Montana. It was added to the Register on April 29, 1980. The Polson Feed Mill was built about 1910. The mill is significant because of its historic associations with the development of Polson and Lake County.

It has an irregular shape with complex roof, but its longest plan dimensions are 70 feet (21 m) by 56 feet (17 m).
