= Fort Connah Site =

- Fort Connah Entrance
- U.S. National Register of Historic Places
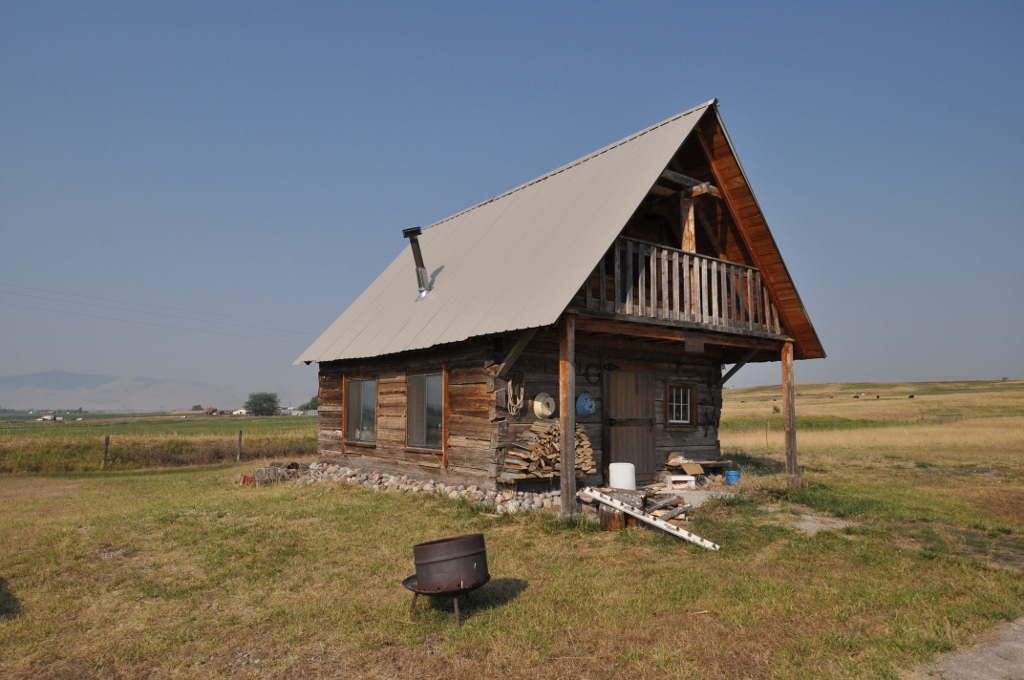

- Location within Montana Location within the United States
- Location: U.S. Route 93
- Coordinates: 47°24′20″N 114°05′14″W
- NRHP reference No.: 82003173
- Added to NRHP: April 28, 1982

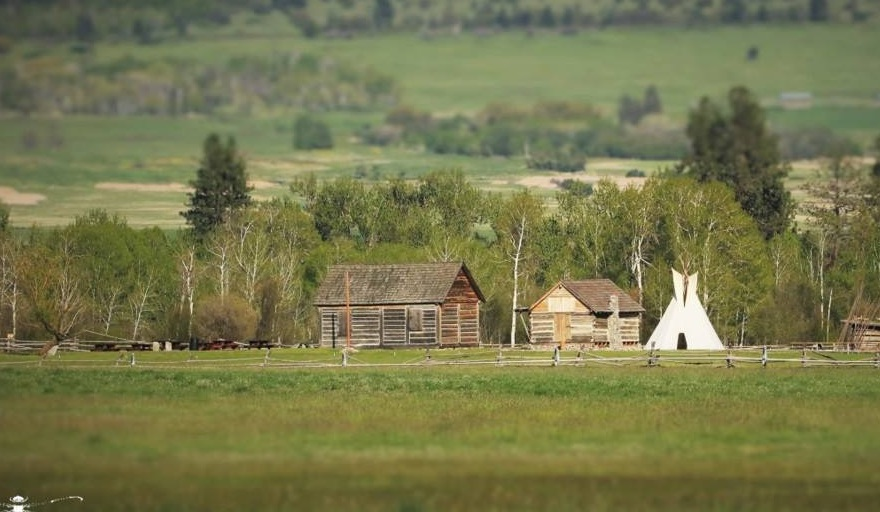
Fort Connah, left

The Fort Connah Site is a site on the National Register of Historic Places located on U.S. Route 93 between St. Ignatius and Charlo, Montana. It was added to the Register on April 28, 1982. The fort was established in 1846 by the Hudson's Bay Company. The remaining building is believed to be the oldest standing in Montana.

Construction of the Fort began in the fall of 1846 by Neil McArthur and was completed in 1847 by Angus McDonald. It remained an important trading post until 1871.
