= Kings Point, Montana =

- Census-designated place
- Location of Kings Point, Montana
- Coordinates: 47°4′08″N 114°09′17″W
- Country: United States
- State: Montana
- County: Lake

Area
  - Total: 1.35 sq mi (3.50 km^{2})
  - Land: 1.35 sq mi (3.50 km^{2})
  - Water: 0 sq mi (0.00 km^{2})
- Elevation: 3,051 ft (930 m)

Population (2020)
  - Total: 201
  - Density: 148.6/sq mi (57.37/km^{2})
- Time zone: UTC-7 (Mountain (MST))
  - Summer (DST): UTC-6 (MDT)
- Area code: 406
- FIPS code: 30-40725
- GNIS feature ID: 2408482

Kings Point is a census-designated place (CDP) in Lake County, Montana, United States. As of the 2020 census, Kings Point had a population of 201.

== Geography ==
Kings Point is located in north-central Lake County. It occupies the western shore of Flathead Lake from Black Point in the north to the community of Rocky Point in the south. Physical features along the lake that are in the CDP from north to south include Safety Bay, The Narrows, Lansing Point, Kings Point, Stone Quarry Bay, and Wolf Point. Black Point Road, Kings Point Road, and Rocky Point Road form the western edge of the CDP. The community is 6 miles (10 km) north of Polson, the county seat.

According to the United States Census Bureau, the CDP has a total area of 1.4 square miles (3.5 km^{2}), all land.

== Demographics ==
Historical population
Census	Pop.	Note	%±
2020	201		—
U.S. Decennial Census

As of the census of 2000, there were 169 people, 82 households, and 60 families residing in the CDP. The population density was 120.4 inhabitants per square mile (46.5/km^{2}). There were 295 housing units at an average density of 210.2 per square mile (81.2/km^{2}). The racial makeup of the CDP was 85.21% White, 8.28% Native American, 1.78% Asian, and 4.73% from two or more races. Hispanic or Latino of any race were 1.18% of the population.

There were 82 households, out of which 12.2% had children under the age of 18 living with them, 65.9% were married couples living together, 6.1% had a female householder with no husband present, and 26.8% were non-families. 19.5% of all households were made up of individuals, and 9.8% had someone living alone who was 65 years of age or older. The average household size was 2.06 and the average family size was 2.32.

In the CDP, the population was spread out, with 9.5% under the age of 18, 3.0% from 18 to 24, 14.2% from 25 to 44, 37.3% from 45 to 64, and 36.1% who were 65 years of age or older. The median age was 57 years. For every 100 females, there were 103.6 males. For every 100 females age 18 and over, there were 104.0 males.

The median income for a household in the CDP was $19,750, and the median income for a family was $73,281. Males had a median income of $0 versus $12,292 for females. The per capita income for the CDP was $22,827. None of the families and 13.2% of the population were living below the poverty line, including no under eighteens and 18.9% of those over 64.
