= Rocky Point, Montana =

- Census-designated place
- Location of Rocky Point, Montana
- Coordinates: 47°43′56″N 114°11′08″W
- Country: United States
- State: Montana
- County: Lake

Area
  - Total: 0.61 sq mi (1.57 km^{2})
  - Land: 0.61 sq mi (1.57 km^{2})
  - Water: 0 sq mi (0.00 km^{2})
- Elevation: 2,933 ft (894 m)

Population (2020)
  - Total: 111
  - Density: 182.8/sq mi (70.57/km^{2})
- Time zone: UTC-7 (Mountain (MST))
  - Summer (DST): UTC-6 (MDT)
- Area code: 406
- FIPS code: 30-63940
- GNIS feature ID: 2409200

Rocky Point is a census-designated place (CDP) in Lake County, Montana, United States. As of the 2020 census, Rocky Point had a population of 111.

== Geography ==
Rocky Point is located in north-central Lake County along the west shore of the south end of Flathead Lake. It is bordered to the northeast by the Kings Point CDP and to the southwest by the Jette CDP. It is 3 miles (5 km) north of Polson, the county seat.

According to the United States Census Bureau, the CDP has a total area of 0.62 square miles (1.6 km^{2}), all land.

== Demographics ==
Historical population
Census	Pop.	Note	%±
2020	111		—
U.S. Decennial Census

As of the census of 2000, there were 107 people, 45 households, and 34 families residing in the CDP. The population density was 174.8 inhabitants per square mile (67.5/km^{2}). There were 66 housing units at an average density of 107.8 per square mile (41.6/km^{2}). The racial makeup of the CDP was 95.33% White, 0.93% Native American, and 3.74% from two or more races.

There were 45 households, out of which 26.7% had children under the age of 18 living with them, 62.2% were married couples living together, 4.4% had a female householder with no husband present, and 24.4% were non-families. 17.8% of all households were made up of individuals, and 8.9% had someone living alone who was 65 years of age or older. The average household size was 2.38 and the average family size was 2.71.

In the CDP, the population was spread out, with 21.5% under the age of 18, 4.7% from 18 to 24, 19.6% from 25 to 44, 35.5% from 45 to 64, and 18.7% who were 65 years of age or older. The median age was 48 years. For every 100 females, there were 94.5 males. For every 100 females age 18 and over, there were 86.7 males.

The median income for a household in the CDP was $41,364, and the median income for a family was $54,643. Males had a median income of $47,969 versus $26,250 for females. The per capita income for the CDP was $17,576. There were no families and 20.0% of the population living below the poverty line, including no under eighteens and none of those over 64.
