= Finley Point, Montana =

- Census-designated place
- Location of Finley Point, Montana
- Coordinates: 47°45′05″N 114°04′11″W
- Country: United States
- State: Montana
- County: Lake

Area
  - Total: 11.39 sq mi (29.51 km^{2})
  - Land: 4.27 sq mi (11.05 km^{2})
  - Water: 7.13 sq mi (18.46 km^{2})
- Elevation: 2,891 ft (881 m)

Population (2020)
  - Total: 532
  - Density: 124.7/sq mi (48.14/km^{2})
- Time zone: UTC-7 (Mountain (MST))
  - Summer (DST): UTC-6 (MDT)
- Area code: 406
- FIPS code: 30-26226
- GNIS feature ID: 2408212

Finley Point (Salish: sčc̓méple) is a census-designated place (CDP) in Lake County, Montana, United States. As of the 2020 census, Finley Point had a population of 532.

== Geography ==
The Finley Point CDP is located in north-central Lake County. It occupies a peninsula named Finley Point that extends into Flathead Lake from the southeast, separating Skidoo Bay to the north from East Bay to the south. The CDP is bordered to the east by Montana Highway 35, which follows the eastern shore of Flathead Lake, leading north 25 miles (40 km) to Bigfork and southwest 8 miles (13 km) to Polson, the Lake county seat.

According to the United States Census Bureau, the CDP has a total area of 11.4 square miles (29.5 km^{2}), of which 4.3 square miles (11.1 km^{2}) are land and 7.1 square miles (18.5 km^{2}), or 62.56%, are water.

Near Finley Point is nccm̓esšn, "place with small rocks."

== Demographics ==
Historical population
Census	Pop.	Note	%±
2020	532		—
U.S. Decennial Census

As of the census of 2000, there were 493 people, 213 households, and 142 families residing in the CDP. The population density was 115.0 inhabitants per square mile (44.4/km^{2}). There were 637 housing units at an average density of 148.6 per square mile (57.4/km^{2}). The racial makeup of the CDP was 80.93% White, 14.00% Native American, 0.20% Asian, 0.61% from other races, and 4.26% from two or more races. Hispanic or Latino of any race were 1.22% of the population.

There were 213 households, out of which 20.7% had children under the age of 18 living with them, 58.7% were married couples living together, 4.2% had a female householder with no husband present, and 32.9% were non-families. 29.6% of all households were made up of individuals, and 9.9% had someone living alone who was 65 years of age or older. The average household size was 2.25 and the average family size was 2.76.

In the CDP, the population was spread out, with 18.7% under the age of 18, 5.9% from 18 to 24, 20.5% from 25 to 44, 35.3% from 45 to 64, and 19.7% who were 65 years of age or older. The median age was 48 years. For every 100 females, there were 110.7 males. For every 100 females age 18 and over, there were 112.2 males.

The median income for a household in the CDP was $30,987, and the median income for a family was $49,063. Males had a median income of $40,714 versus $17,639 for females. The per capita income for the CDP was $19,575. About 7.9% of families and 8.4% of the population were below the poverty line, including 14.0% of those under age 18 and none of those age 65 or over.
