= Kootenai Lodge Historic District =

Historic district in Montana, United States

- U.S. National Register of Historic Places
- U.S. Historic district
- Location within Montana Location within the United States
- Location: Sunburst Dr., vicinity of Bigfork, Montana
- Coordinates: 48°01′16″N 113°58′33″W
- Area: 42 acres (17 ha)
- Built by: Averil, Les
- Architect: Cutter, Kirkland
- Architectural style: Bungalow/craftsman, Rustic
- NRHP reference No.: 84002476
- Added to NRHP: January 17, 1984

The Kootenai Lodge Historic District is a site on the National Register of Historic Places located in Bigfork, Montana. It was added to the Register on January 17, 1984. The listing has 25 contributing buildings.

Architects Cutter and Malmgran are believed to have designed cabins #1, #2, #3, #5, #6, and #7, which were built by local craftsmen Ward Whitney and Fred Kitzmiller. William Moose was stonemason.

The 1922 barn was built by local builder Les Averil.
