= Lonepine, Montana =

- CDP
- Location of Lonepine, Montana
- Coordinates: 47°41′32″N 114°38′22″W
- Country: United States
- State: Montana
- County: Sanders
- Established: 1911

Area
  - Total: 13.85 sq mi (35.86 km^{2})
  - Land: 13.44 sq mi (34.80 km^{2})
  - Water: 0.41 sq mi (1.07 km^{2})
- Elevation: 2,861 ft (872 m)

Population (2020)
  - Total: 177
  - Density: 13.2/sq mi (5.09/km^{2})
- Time zone: UTC-7 (Mountain (MST))
  - Summer (DST): UTC-6 (MDT)
- ZIP code: 59848
- Area code: 406
- FIPS code: 30-44950
- GNIS feature ID: 0786505

Lonepine is a census-designated place (CDP) in Sanders County, Montana, United States. As of the 2020 census, Lonepine had a population of 177.

The post office was established in 1911. In 1921, the U.S. Reclamation Service built the Lower Dry Fork Reservoir to provide irrigation for the region. The 2,800-foot-long dam impounds 4,200 acre-feet of water.

== Geography ==
Lonepine is located at 47°41′32″N 114°38′22″W (47.692096, -114.639481).

According to the United States Census Bureau, the CDP has a total area of 13.9 square miles (36 km^{2}), of which 13.6 square miles (35 km^{2}) is land and 0.2 square miles (0.52 km^{2}) (1.73%) is water.

=== Climate ===
This climatic region is typified by large seasonal temperature differences, with warm to hot (and often humid) summers and cold (sometimes severely cold) winters. According to the Köppen Climate Classification system, Lonepine has a humid continental climate, abbreviated "Dfb" on climate maps.

== Demographics ==
Historical population
Census	Pop.	Note	%±
2020	177		—
U.S. Decennial Census

As of the census of 2000, there were 137 people, 54 households, and 42 families residing in the CDP. The population density was 10.0 inhabitants per square mile (3.9/km^{2}). There were 60 housing units at an average density of 4.4 per square mile (1.7/km^{2}). The racial makeup of the CDP was 86.86% White, 1.46% African American, 5.11% Native American, 0.73% from other races, and 5.84% from two or more races. Hispanic or Latino of any race were 5.11% of the population.

There were 54 households, out of which 33.3% had children under the age of 18 living with them, 63.0% were married couples living together, 5.6% had a female householder with no husband present, and 22.2% were non-families. 22.2% of all households were made up of individuals, and 5.6% had someone living alone who was 65 years of age or older. The average household size was 2.54 and the average family size was 2.98.

In the CDP, the population was spread out, with 30.7% under the age of 18, 5.8% from 18 to 24, 15.3% from 25 to 44, 30.7% from 45 to 64, and 17.5% who were 65 years of age or older. The median age was 44 years. For every 100 females, there were 98.6 males. For every 100 females age 18 and over, there were 126.2 males.

The median income for a household in the CDP was $26,250, and the median income for a family was $28,125. Males had a median income of $30,000 versus $15,625 for females. The per capita income for the CDP was $16,218. There were 9.8% of families and 6.3% of the population living below the poverty line, including no under eighteens and none of those over 64.
