= Turtle Lake, Montana =

- Census-designated place
- Location of Turtle Lake, Montana
- Coordinates: 47°40′11″N 114°04′55″W
- Country: United States
- State: Montana
- County: Lake

Area
  - Total: 0.66 sq mi (1.71 km^{2})
  - Land: 0.60 sq mi (1.55 km^{2})
  - Water: 0.062 sq mi (0.16 km^{2})
- Elevation: 3,081 ft (939 m)

Population (2020)
  - Total: 251
  - Density: 420/sq mi (162.1/km^{2})
- Time zone: UTC-7 (Mountain (MST))
  - Summer (DST): UTC-6 (MDT)
- Area code: 406
- FIPS code: 30-75287
- GNIS feature ID: 2409366

Turtle Lake (Salish: čɫqq̓liʔ) is a census-designated place (CDP) in Lake County, Montana, United States. As of the 2020 census, Turtle Lake had a population of 251.

== Geography ==
Turtle Lake is located in central Lake County. It is a residential community sited around Turtle Lake, a small water body that seasonally drains north to Flathead Lake. It is 5 miles (8 km) southeast of Polson, the Lake county seat.

According to the United States Census Bureau, the Turtle Lake CDP has a total area of 0.66 square miles (1.7 km^{2}), of which 0.58 square miles (1.5 km^{2}) are land and 0.077 square miles (0.2 km^{2}), or 9.37%, are water.

== Demographics ==
Historical population
Census	Pop.	Note	%±
2020	251		—
U.S. Decennial Census

As of the census of 2000, there were 194 people, 55 households, and 43 families residing in the CDP. The population density was 373.2 inhabitants per square mile (144.1/km^{2}). There were 60 housing units at an average density of 115.4 per square mile (44.6/km^{2}). The racial makeup of the CDP was 7.73% White, 89.18% Native American, and 3.09% from two or more races. Hispanic or Latino of any race were 3.09% of the population.

There were 55 households, out of which 49.1% had children under the age of 18 living with them, 40.0% were married couples living together, 30.9% had a female householder with no husband present, and 21.8% were non-families. 16.4% of all households were made up of individuals, and 3.6% had someone living alone who was 65 years of age or older. The average household size was 3.53 and the average family size was 3.93.

In the CDP, the population was spread out, with 46.9% under the age of 18, 8.8% from 18 to 24, 23.7% from 25 to 44, 17.5% from 45 to 64, and 3.1% who were 65 years of age or older. The median age was 21 years. For every 100 females, there were 104.2 males. For every 100 females age 18 and over, there were 106.0 males.

The median income for a household in the CDP was $36,250, and the median income for a family was $23,125. Males had a median income of $16,042 versus $14,861 for females. The per capita income for the CDP was $9,838. About 46.5% of families and 54.8% of the population were below the poverty line, including all of those under the age of 18 and none of those 65 or over.
