= Jette, Montana =

- Census-designated place
- Location of Jette, Montana
- Coordinates: 47°43′01″N 114°11′26″W
- Country: United States
- State: Montana
- County: Lake

Area
  - Total: 0.62 sq mi (1.60 km^{2})
  - Land: 0.62 sq mi (1.60 km^{2})
  - Water: 0 sq mi (0.00 km^{2})
- Elevation: 2,936 ft (895 m)

Population (2020)
  - Total: 273
  - Density: 441.6/sq mi (170.49/km^{2})
- Time zone: UTC-7 (Mountain (MST))
  - Summer (DST): UTC-6 (MDT)
- Area code: 406
- FIPS code: 30-39627
- GNIS feature ID: 2408445

Jette is a census-designated place (CDP) in Lake County, Montana, United States. As of the 2020 census, Jette had a population of 273.

== Geography ==
Jette is located in north-central Lake County on the western side of Flathead Lake near its southern end. The community is bordered to the south by Polson, the county seat, and to the north by the community of Rocky Point. U.S. Route 93 forms the southwestern edge of the Jette CDP, leading northwest 14 miles (23 km) to Elmo and southeast 2 miles (3 km) to the center of Polson and a further 36 miles (58 km) to Ravalli.

According to the United States Census Bureau, the CDP has a total area of 0.62 square miles (1.6 km^{2}), all land.

== Demographics ==
Historical population
Census	Pop.	Note	%±
2020	273		—
U.S. Decennial Census

As of the census of 2000, there were 267 people, 103 households, and 84 families residing in the CDP. The population density was 431.8 inhabitants per square mile (166.7/km^{2}). There were 138 housing units at an average density of 223.2 per square mile (86.2/km^{2}). The racial makeup of the CDP was 91.39% White, 3.75% Native American, 0.37% from other races, and 4.49% from two or more races. Hispanic or Latino of any race were 3.00% of the population.

There were 103 households, out of which 25.2% had children under the age of 18 living with them, 74.8% were married couples living together, 4.9% had a female householder with no husband present, and 18.4% were non-families. 13.6% of all households were made up of individuals, and 7.8% had someone living alone who was 65 years of age or older. The average household size was 2.59 and the average family size was 2.85.

In the CDP, the population was spread out, with 23.6% under the age of 18, 3.4% from 18 to 24, 19.5% from 25 to 44, 28.1% from 45 to 64, and 25.5% who were 65 years of age or older. The median age was 46 years. For every 100 females, there were 88.0 males. For every 100 females age 18 and over, there were 88.9 males.

The median income for a household in the CDP was $43,889, and the median income for a family was $61,250. Males had a median income of $87,041 versus $9,712 for females. The per capita income for the CDP was $25,808. None of the population or families were below the poverty line.
