= Kerr, Montana =

- Census-designated place
- Location of Kerr, Montana
- Coordinates: 47°40′38″N 114°11′14″W
- Country: United States
- State: Montana
- County: Lake

Area
  - Total: 1.02 sq mi (2.63 km^{2})
  - Land: 0.91 sq mi (2.36 km^{2})
  - Water: 0.11 sq mi (0.28 km^{2})
- Elevation: 3,012 ft (918 m)

Population (2020)
  - Total: 273
  - Density: 300.1/sq mi (115.86/km^{2})
- Time zone: UTC-7 (Mountain (MST))
  - Summer (DST): UTC-6 (MDT)
- Area code: 406
- FIPS code: 30-40355
- GNIS feature ID: 2408475

Kerr is a census-designated place (CDP) in Lake County, Montana, United States. As of the 2020 census, Kerr had a population of 273.

== Geography ==
Kerr is located in north-central Lake County bordering the southwest side of Polson, the county seat. The western edge of the Kerr CDP is formed by the Flathead River as it exits Flathead Lake.

According to the United States Census Bureau, the CDP has a total area of 1.02 square miles (2.63 km^{2}), of which 0.91 square miles (2.36 km^{2}) are land and 0.11 square miles (0.28 km^{2}), or 10.49%, are water.

== Demographics ==
Historical population
| Census | Pop. | Note | %± |
|---|---|---|---|
| 2020 | 273 | | — |
U.S. Decennial Census

As of the census of 2000, there were 17 people, 6 households, and 6 families residing in the CDP. The population density was 69.9 inhabitants per square mile (27.0/km^{2}). There were 9 housing units at an average density of 37.0 per square mile (14.3/km^{2}). The racial makeup of the CDP was 82.35% White and 17.65% Native American. Hispanic or Latino of any race were 11.76% of the population.

There were 6 households, out of which 50.0% had children under the age of 18 living with them, 100.0% were married couples living together, and 0.0% were non-families. No households were made up of individuals, and none had someone living alone who was 65 years of age or older. The average household size was 2.83 and the average family size was 2.83.

In the CDP, the population was spread out, with 23.5% under the age of 18, 11.8% from 18 to 24, 23.5% from 25 to 44, 29.4% from 45 to 64, and 11.8% who were 65 years of age or older. The median age was 42 years. For every 100 females, there were 70.0 males. For every 100 females age 18 and over, there were 85.7 males.
