= Kicking Horse, Montana =

- Census-designated place
- Location of Kicking Horse, Montana
- Coordinates: 47°27′24″N 114°04′18″W
- Country: United States
- State: Montana
- County: Lake

Area
  - Total: 3.56 sq mi (9.21 km^{2})
  - Land: 2.42 sq mi (6.26 km^{2})
  - Water: 1.14 sq mi (2.95 km^{2})
- Elevation: 3,064 ft (934 m)

Population (2020)
  - Total: 76
  - Density: 31.5/sq mi (12.15/km^{2})
- Time zone: UTC-7 (Mountain (MST))
  - Summer (DST): UTC-6 (MDT)
- Area code: 406
- FIPS code: 30-40580
- GNIS feature ID: 2408480

Kicking Horse is a census-designated place (CDP) in Lake County, Montana, United States. As of the 2020 census, Kicking Horse had a population of 76. It was 286 at the 2010 census, up from 80 in 2000.

== Geography ==
Kicking Horse is located in south-central Lake County. It covers all of Kicking Horse Reservoir and land to the east and south. The CDP extends west to U.S. Route 93, south to Eagle Pass Trail, and east to Hillside Road. The northwest boundary follows Kicking Horse Road and the northwest side of Kicking Horse Reservoir up to Mollmann Pass Trail, which forms the short northern border of the CDP. Kicking Horse is 19 miles (31 km) south of Polson, the Lake county seat, 5 miles (8 km) south of Ronan, and 15 miles (24 km) north of Ravalli via US 93.

According to the United States Census Bureau, the Kicking Horse CDP has a total area of 3.6 square miles (9.2 km^{2}), of which 2.4 square miles (6.3 km^{2}) are land and 1.2 square miles (3.0 km^{2}), or 32.06%, are water.

== Demographics ==
Historical population
Census	Pop.	Note	%±
2020	76		—
U.S. Decennial Census

As of the census of 2000, there were 80 people, 27 households, and 19 families residing in the CDP. The population density was 32.4 inhabitants per square mile (12.5/km^{2}). There were 29 housing units at an average density of 11.7 per square mile (4.5/km^{2}). The racial makeup of the CDP was 47.50% White, 46.25% Native American, 2.50% from other races, and 3.75% from two or more races. Hispanic or Latino of any race were 1.25% of the population.

There were 27 households, out of which 48.1% had children under the age of 18 living with them, 51.9% were married couples living together, 7.4% had a female householder with no husband present, and 29.6% were non-families. 18.5% of all households were made up of individuals, and 3.7% had someone living alone who was 65 years of age or older. The average household size was 2.96 and the average family size was 3.32.

In the CDP, the population was spread out, with 33.8% under the age of 18, 7.5% from 18 to 24, 35.0% from 25 to 44, 21.3% from 45 to 64, and 2.5% who were 65 years of age or older. The median age was 29 years. For every 100 females, there were 95.1 males. For every 100 females age 18 and over, there were 112.0 males.

The median income for a household in the CDP was $28,906, and the median income for a family was $60,078. Males had a median income of $38,750 versus $7,500 for females. The per capita income for the CDP was $16,524. There were 22.6% of families and 41.8% of the population living below the poverty line, including 100.0% of under eighteens and 50.0% of those over 64.
