= Charlo, Montana =

- Census-designated place
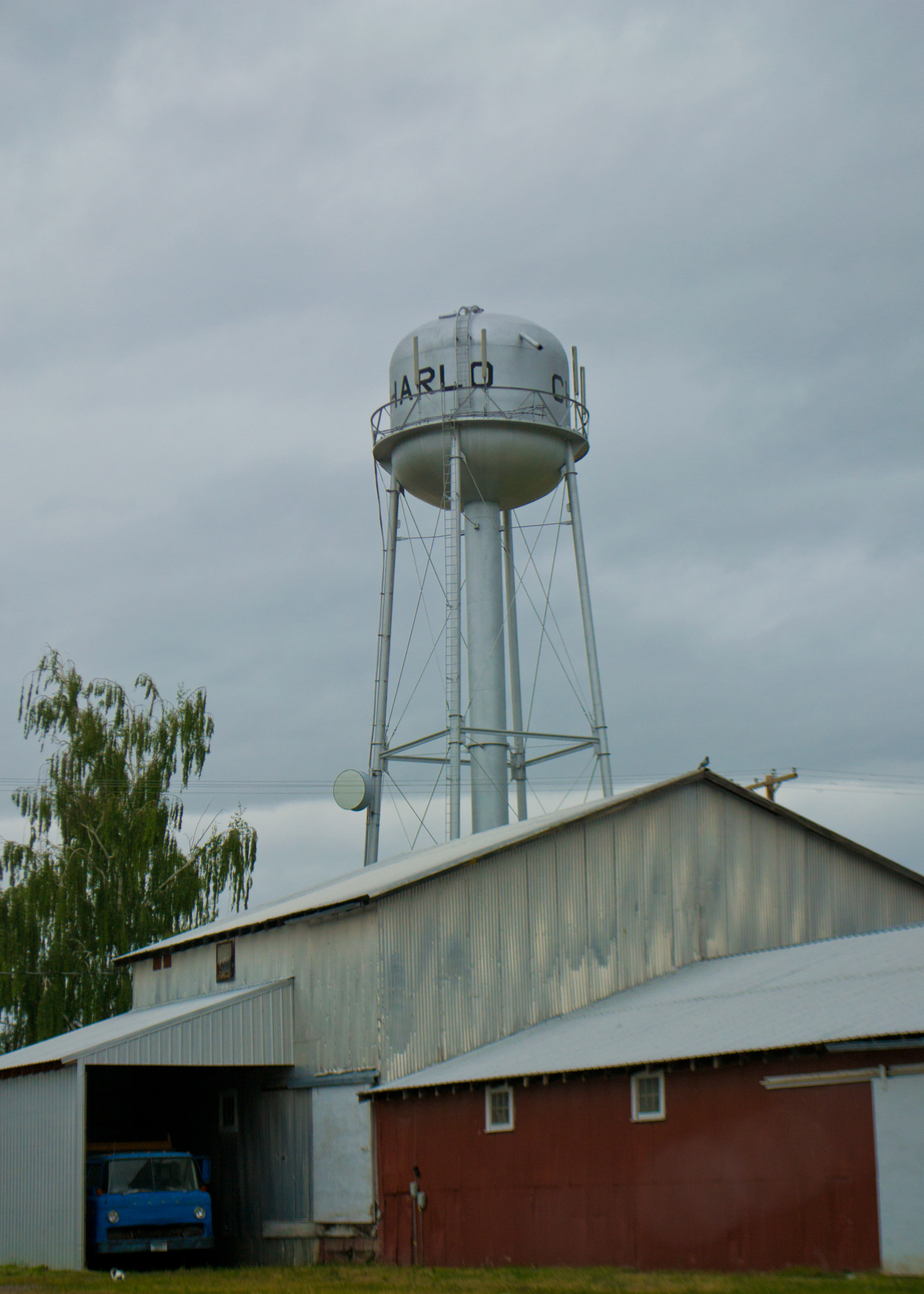

- Location of Charlo, Montana
- Coordinates: 47°26′34″N 114°10′18″W
- Country: United States
- State: Montana
- County: Lake

Area
  - Total: 2.00 sq mi (5.19 km^{2})
  - Land: 1.99 sq mi (5.16 km^{2})
  - Water: 0.012 sq mi (0.03 km^{2})
- Elevation: 2,943 ft (897 m)

Population (2020)
  - Total: 385
  - Density: 193.3/sq mi (74.64/km^{2})
- Time zone: UTC-7 (Mountain (MST))
  - Summer (DST): UTC-6 (MDT)
- ZIP code: 59824
- Area code: 406
- FIPS code: 30-13900
- GNIS feature ID: 2408013

Charlo (Salish: sallu) is an unincorporated community and census-designated place (CDP) in Lake County, Montana, United States. The population was 385 at the 2020 census.

The town was named in 1918 after the Salish leader Chief Charlo. Previously it had been called Big Flat, Charlotte, and Tabor.

== Geography ==
According to the United States Census Bureau, the CDP has a total area of 2.0 square miles (5.2 km^{2}), of which 0.01 square miles (0.03 km^{2}), or 0.58%, are water.

Charlo is located in southern Lake County and is 22 miles (35 km) south of Polson, the county seat. The CDP is within the Flathead Indian Reservation.

Charlo borders several protected areas, including the Herak Waterfowl Production area and Ninepipes Reservoir. These protected areas, along with seasonal flood irrigation, provide habitats for various native fauna such as white-tailed deer, pheasants, bald eagles, and western painted turtles.

Charlo is home to the Owl Research Institute which manages scientific research on Owls of all species. There are also 2 platforms for osprey nests located near the lake. A live cam features real-time video of the birds.

Southwest of Charlo is the CSKT Bison Range, a refuge managed by the Confederated Salish and Kootenai Tribes.

== Demographics ==
Historical population
| Census | Pop. | Note | %± |
|---|---|---|---|
| 2020 | 385 | | — |
U.S. Decennial Census

=== 2020 Data ===
At the 2020 census, there were 385 people, 170 households and 133 families residing in the CDP. The population density was 219.4 inhabitants per square mile (84.7/km^{2}). There were 170 housing units at an average density of 193.37/sq mi(74.64/km^{2).} The racial makeup of the CDP was 79.4% White, .26% African American, 11.7% Native American, .52% from other races, and 7.5% from two or more races. Hispanic or Latino of any race were 2.86% of the population.

There were 170 households, of which 13.3% had children under the age of 18 living with them, 34.6% were married couples living together, 35.3% had a female householder with no husband present, and 42.9% were non-families. 44.4% of all households were made up of individuals, and 21.1% had someone living alone who was 65 years of age or older. The average household size was 1.87 and the average family size was 2.64.

8.6% of the population were under the age of 18, 3.9% from 18 to 24, 15.3% from 25 to 44, 23.1% from 45 to 64, and 15.8% who were 65 years of age or older. The median age was 52.6 years. For every 100 females, there were 102.4 males. The median household income was $34,219 and the median family income was $48,066. Males had a median income of $22,500 and females $19,375. About 11.6% of families and 19.2% of the population were below the poverty line, including 13.3% of those under age 18 and 24.5% of those age 65 or over.

== Town events ==
Each year, residents of Charlo host a Fourth of July parade and cookout along Main Street. Regular participants include local equestrian units, Charlo "all school" alumni, representatives from all branches of military service, and the local fire department.

In addition, the town also hosts an annual Fireman's Benefit and Dinner to support the local volunteer fire department. The Charlo Outdoor Community Complex, a community-sponsored organization to fund a new track and football field for the Charlo Public School, hosts an annual Fun run, 5K run, and 10K run as a fundraiser event.

== Education ==
Charlo School District educates students from kindergarten through 12th grade. They are known as the Vikings. Charlo High School is a Class C school, which is a designation used for sporting events.

As of 2023, Charlo School District had a total of 229 students enrolled: 96 elementary students, 57 middle school students, and 76 high school students. Along with core classes, Charlo School District offers a variety of electives.

=== Educational Clubs ===
Charlo High School offers clubs such as Business Professionals of America (BPA), Health Occupations Students of America (HOSA), SkillsUSA, National Honor Society (NHS), and more.

== Media ==
The Valley Journal provides local news to Arlee, Charlo, Pablo, Polson, Ronan, and St. Ignatius.

The FM radio station KYMI is licensed in Charlo. It is owned by the Educational Media Foundation, a Christian media ministry.

== Infrastructure ==
Charlo is along Montana Highway 212. It is 4 miles (6 km) west of U.S. Route 93. Via Highway 212, it is 13 miles (21 km) northeast of Sčilíp.

The nearest commercial airport is Missoula Montana Airport, 50 miles (80 km) away. Another option is Glacier Park International Airport, 78 miles (126 km) away.
