= Big Arm, Montana =

- Census-designated place
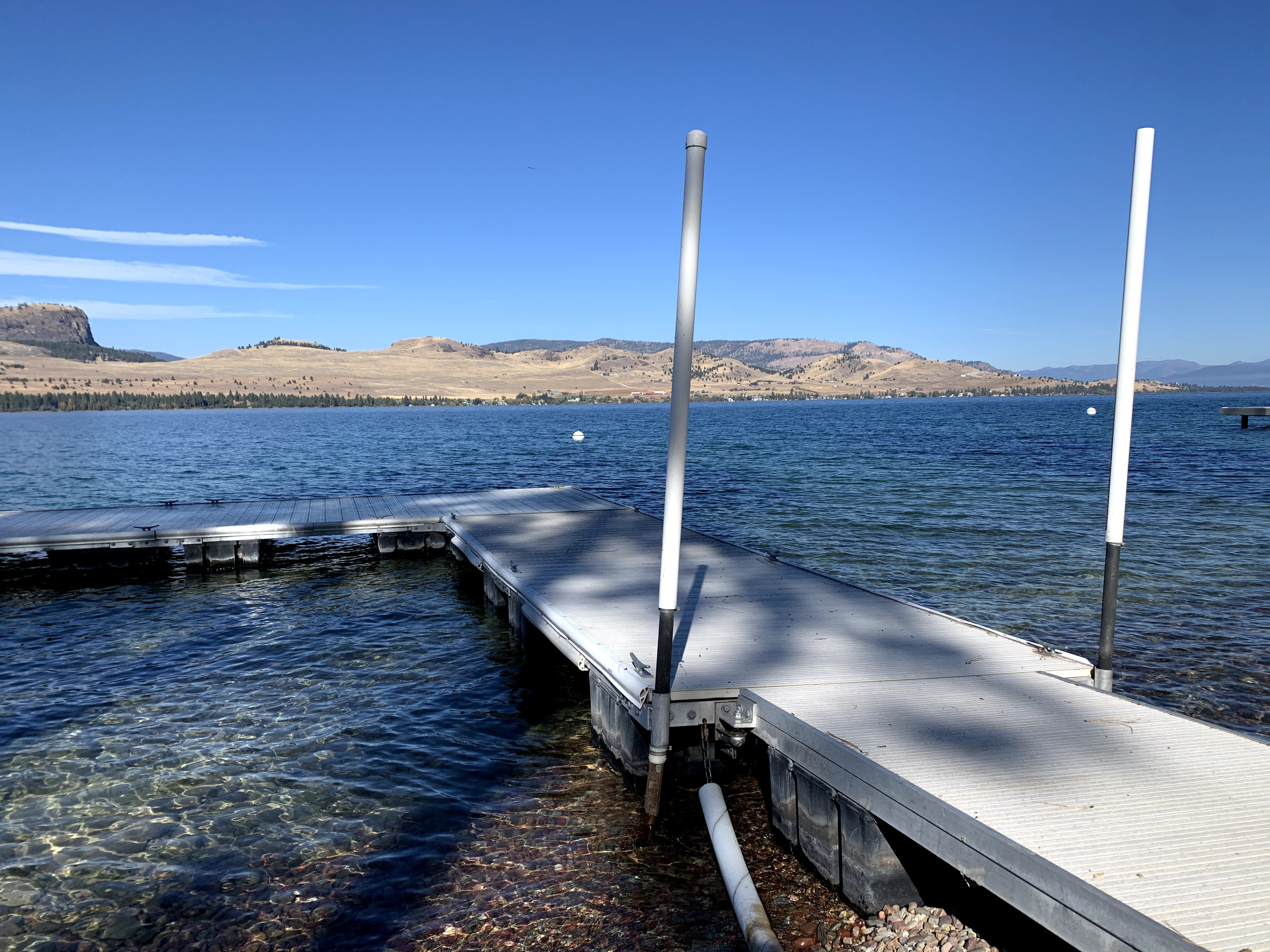
- Flathead Lake from Big Arm

- Location of Big Arm, Montana
- Coordinates: 47°47′39″N 114°15′48″W
- Country: United States
- State: Montana
- County: Lake

Area
  - Total: 5.42 sq mi (14.03 km^{2})
  - Land: 5.42 sq mi (14.03 km^{2})
  - Water: 0 sq mi (0.00 km^{2})
- Elevation: 3,849 ft (1,173 m)

Population (2020)
  - Total: 218
  - Density: 40.2/sq mi (15.53/km^{2})
- Time zone: UTC-7 (Mountain (MST))
  - Summer (DST): UTC-6 (MDT)
- ZIP code: 59910
- Area code: 406
- FIPS code: 30-05800
- GNIS feature ID: 2407837

Big Arm is a census-designated place (CDP) in Lake County, Montana, United States. As of the 2020 census, Big Arm had a population of 218.

The town is situated on the south side of Big Arm, a large bay on Flathead Lake, hence its name. The name was used by the Kootenai people, who lived there prior to the town being established. The post office opened in 1911, with Marion F. Lamb as postmaster.

Big Arm State Park is located just north of the town.

== Geography ==
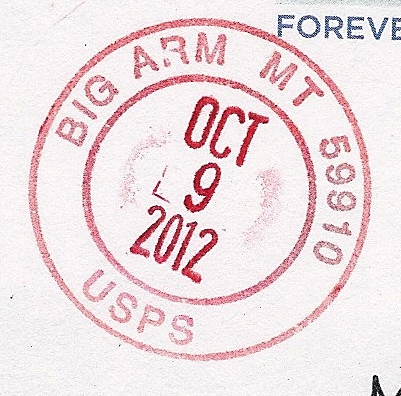
Big Arm postmark

Big Arm is located in northwestern Lake County. The census-designated place contains the settlement of Big Arm along the southern shore of Flathead Lake's Big Arm, as well as undeveloped grassland to the south, up to the base of an unnamed 5,100-foot (1,600 m) mountain. The CDP is bordered to the northeast by the community of Lindisfarne.

U.S. Route 93 passes through Big Arm, running just south of the lake shore. The highway leads southeast 12 miles (19 km) to Polson, the Lake county seat, and northwest 4 miles (6 km) to Elmo. The city of Kalispell is 39 miles (63 km) north of Big Arm.

According to the United States Census Bureau, the CDP has a total area of 5.4 square miles (14.0 km^{2}), all land.

=== Climate ===
This climatic region is typified by large seasonal temperature differences, with warm to hot (and often humid) summers and cold (sometimes severely cold) winters. According to the Köppen Climate Classification system, Big Arm has a humid continental climate, abbreviated "Dfb" on climate maps.

== Demographics ==
Historical population
| Census | Pop. | Note | %± |
|---|---|---|---|
| 2020 | 218 | | — |
U.S. Decennial Census

As of the census of 2000, there were 131 people, 56 households, and 39 families residing in the CDP. The population density was 24.0 inhabitants per square mile (9.3/km^{2}). There were 124 housing units at an average density of 22.8 per square mile (8.8/km^{2}). The racial makeup of the CDP was 69.47% White and 30.53% Native American.

There were 56 households, out of which 23.2% had children under the age of 18 living with them, 53.6% were married couples living together, 8.9% had a female householder with no husband present, and 28.6% were non-families. 21.4% of all households were made up of individuals, and 7.1% had someone living alone who was 65 years of age or older. The average household size was 2.34 and the average family size was 2.60.

In the CDP, the population was spread out, with 19.8% under the age of 18, 9.2% from 18 to 24, 18.3% from 25 to 44, 29.8% from 45 to 64, and 22.9% who were 65 years of age or older. The median age was 47 years. For every 100 females there were 111.3 males. For every 100 females age 18 and over, there were 110.0 males.

The median income for a household in the CDP was $29,000, and the median income for a family was $38,750. Males had a median income of $16,750 versus $21,875 for females. The per capita income for the CDP was $16,620. There were no families and 8.0% of the population living below the poverty line, including no under eighteens and 30.0% of those over 64.

== See also ==
- List of census-designated places in Montana
