= Lake County, Montana =

County in Montana, United States

- County
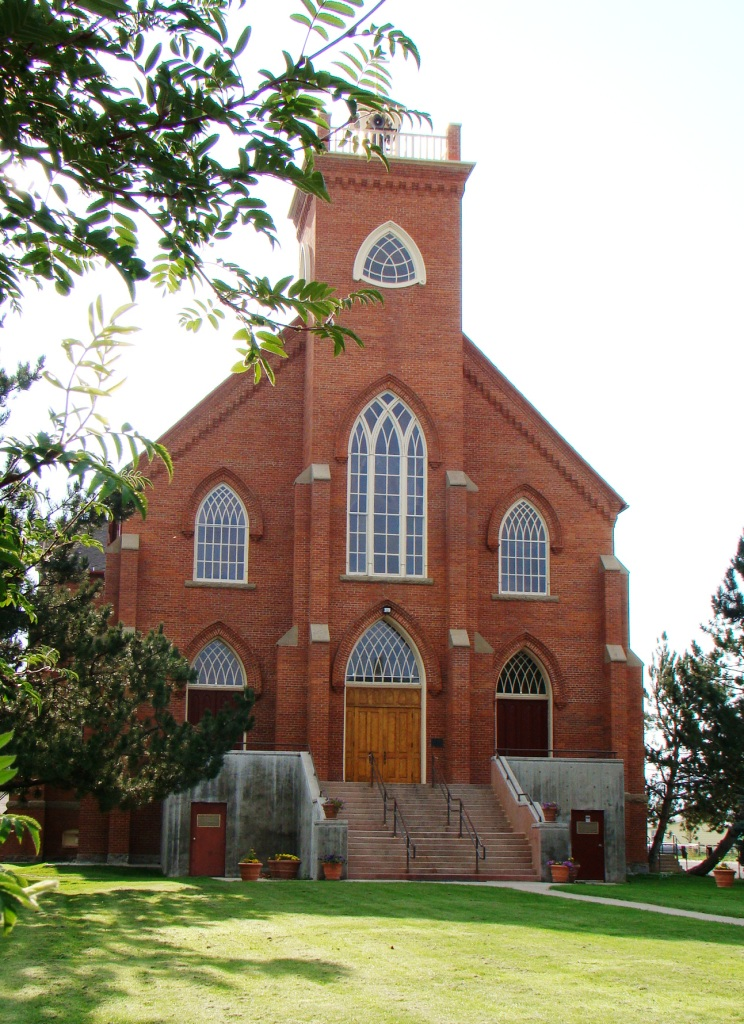
- St. Ignatius Mission at St. Ignatius, Montana

- Location within the U.S. state of Montana
- Coordinates: 47°39′N 114°05′W
- Country: United States
- State: Montana
- Founded: 1923
- Named for: Flathead Lake
- Seat: Polson
- Largest city: Polson

Area
  - Total: 1,654 sq mi (4,280 km^{2})
  - Land: 1,490 sq mi (3,900 km^{2})
  - Water: 164 sq mi (420 km^{2}) 9.9%

Population (2020)
  - Total: 31,134
  - Estimate (2025): 33,392 ▲
  - Density: 20.9/sq mi (8.07/km^{2})
- Time zone: UTC−7 (Mountain)
  - Summer (DST): UTC−6 (MDT)
- Congressional district: 1st
- Website: www.lakemt.gov
- Montana county number 15

Lake County is a county located in the northwest part of the U.S. state of Montana. As of the 2020 census, the population was 31,134. Its county seat is Polson.

== Geography ==
According to the United States Census Bureau, the county has a total area of 1,654 square miles (4,280 km^{2}), of which 1,490 square miles (3,900 km^{2}) is land and 164 square miles (420 km^{2}) (9.9%) is water. Over two-thirds (67.7%) of the county's land lies within the Flathead Indian Reservation.

=== Adjacent counties ===
- Flathead County - north
- Missoula County - east
- Sanders County - west

=== National protected areas ===
- Bison Range (part)
- Flathead National Forest (part)
- Ninepipe National Wildlife Refuge
- Pablo National Wildlife Refuge
- Swan River National Wildlife Refuge

== Demographics ==
Historical population
Census	Pop.	Note	%±
1930	9,541		—
1940	13,490		41.4%
1950	13,835		2.6%
1960	13,104		−5.3%
1970	14,445		10.2%
1980	19,056		31.9%
1990	21,041		10.4%
2000	26,507		26.0%
2010	28,746		8.4%
2020	31,134		8.3%
2025 (est.)	33,392	▲	7.3%
U.S. Decennial Census; 1790–1960, 1900–1990, 1990–2000, 2010–2020

=== 2020 census ===
As of the 2020 census, the county had a population of 31,134. Of the residents, 23.2% were under the age of 18 and 24.3% were 65 years of age or older; the median age was 44.7 years. For every 100 females there were 95.6 males, and for every 100 females age 18 and over there were 93.7 males. 17.9% of residents lived in urban areas and 82.1% lived in rural areas.

The racial makeup of the county was 66.3% White, 0.2% Black or African American, 22.3% American Indian and Alaska Native, 0.5% Asian, 0.8% from some other race, and 9.8% from two or more races. Hispanic or Latino residents of any race comprised 3.8% of the population.

There were 12,486 households in the county, of which 28.4% had children under the age of 18 living with them and 26.1% had a female householder with no spouse or partner present. About 28.3% of all households were made up of individuals and 14.3% had someone living alone who was 65 years of age or older.

There were 16,390 housing units, of which 23.8% were vacant. Among occupied housing units, 71.4% were owner-occupied and 28.6% were renter-occupied. The homeowner vacancy rate was 1.6% and the rental vacancy rate was 4.9%.

=== 2010 census ===
As of the 2010 census, there were 28,746 people, 11,432 households, and 7,770 families living in the county. The population density was 19.3 inhabitants per square mile (7.5/km^{2}). There were 16,588 housing units at an average density of 11.1 per square mile (4.3/km^{2}). The racial makeup of the county was 69.4% white, 22.0% American Indian, 0.4% Asian, 0.3% black or African American, 0.1% Pacific islander, 0.5% from other races, and 7.3% from two or more races. Those of Hispanic or Latino origin made up 3.5% of the population. In terms of ancestry, 22.3% were German, 11.6% were English, 11.5% were Irish, 6.9% were Norwegian, and 3.8% were American.

Of the 11,432 households, 31.0% had children under the age of 18 living with them, 51.0% were married couples living together, 11.5% had a female householder with no husband present, 32.0% were non-families, and 26.5% of all households were made up of individuals. The average household size was 2.46 and the average family size was 2.97. The median age was 41.3 years.

The median income for a household in the county was $37,274 and the median income for a family was $47,437. Males had a median income of $37,461 versus $26,637 for females. The per capita income for the county was $20,164. About 15.4% of families and 21.6% of the population were below the poverty line, including 33.9% of those under age 18 and 9.3% of those age 65 or over.

== Politics ==
United States presidential election results for Lake County, Montana
Year	Republican		Democratic		Third party(ies)	
Year	No.	%	No.	%	No.	%
1924	884	28.00%	340	10.77%	1,933	61.23%
1928	1,876	59.42%	1,256	39.78%	25	0.79%
1932	1,361	33.34%	2,514	61.59%	207	5.07%
1936	1,401	31.68%	2,656	60.06%	365	8.25%
1940	2,718	52.46%	2,379	45.92%	84	1.62%
1944	2,265	55.80%	1,750	43.11%	44	1.08%
1948	2,295	49.35%	2,177	46.82%	178	3.83%
1952	3,651	65.09%	1,893	33.75%	65	1.16%
1956	3,363	59.88%	2,253	40.12%	0	0.00%
1960	3,240	56.75%	2,462	43.12%	7	0.12%
1964	2,828	47.24%	3,148	52.59%	10	0.17%
1968	3,358	55.98%	1,956	32.61%	685	11.42%
1972	4,172	62.09%	2,260	33.64%	287	4.27%
1976	3,809	52.83%	3,253	45.12%	148	2.05%
1980	5,083	59.58%	2,615	30.65%	834	9.77%
1984	5,754	61.55%	3,473	37.15%	121	1.29%
1988	4,883	53.37%	4,109	44.91%	158	1.73%
1992	3,596	34.08%	3,938	37.32%	3,018	28.60%
1996	4,723	43.57%	4,195	38.70%	1,922	17.73%
2000	6,441	56.26%	3,884	33.93%	1,123	9.81%
2004	7,245	57.61%	4,960	39.44%	371	2.95%
2008	6,498	46.56%	6,766	48.48%	692	4.96%
2012	7,135	53.63%	5,805	43.63%	364	2.74%
2016	7,530	57.13%	4,776	36.23%	875	6.64%
2020	9,322	56.07%	6,916	41.60%	388	2.33%
2024	9,880	58.42%	6,510	38.50%	521	3.08%

== Communities ==
=== Cities ===
- Polson (county seat)
- Ronan

=== Town ===
- St. Ignatius

=== Census-designated places ===
- Arlee
- Bear Dance
- Big Arm
- Charlo
- Dayton
- Elmo
- Finley Point
- Jette
- Kerr
- Kicking Horse
- Kings Point
- Lake Mary Ronan
- Lindisfarne
- Niarada
- Pablo
- Ravalli
- Rocky Point
- Rollins
- Swan Lake
- Turtle Lake
- Woods Bay

=== Unincorporated communities ===
- Allentown
- Post Creek
- Proctor
- Round Butte
- Salmon Prairie
- Sipes

== Education ==
School districts include:

K-12 (Unified):

- Hot Springs K-12 Schools
- St. Ignatius K-12 Schools

High school:

- Arlee High School District
- Bigfork High School District
- Charlo High School District
- Missoula High School District
- Polson High School District
- Ronan High School District

Elementary school:

- Arlee Elementary School District
- Bigfork Elementary School District
- Charlo Elementary School District
- Polson Elementary School District
- Ronan Elementary School District
- Swan Lake-Salmon Elementary School District
- Upper West Shore Elementary School District
- Valley View Elementary School District

== See also ==
- List of lakes in Lake County, Montana
- List of mountains in Lake County, Montana
- National Register of Historic Places listings in Lake County, Montana
