= Dayton, Montana =

- Census-designated place
- Location of Dayton, Montana
- Coordinates: 47°51′52″N 114°16′35″W
- Country: United States
- State: Montana
- County: Lake

Area
  - Total: 0.56 sq mi (1.44 km^{2})
  - Land: 0.55 sq mi (1.42 km^{2})
  - Water: 0.0077 sq mi (0.02 km^{2})
- Elevation: 2,920 ft (890 m)

Population (2020)
  - Total: 104
  - Density: 189.3/sq mi (73.09/km^{2})
- Time zone: UTC-7 (Mountain (MST))
  - Summer (DST): UTC-6 (MDT)
- ZIP code: 59914
- Area code: 406
- FIPS code: 30-19525
- GNIS feature ID: 2408645

Dayton (Kalispel-Pend d'Oreille: iʔɫixʷ, Ktunaxa: aki¢qa) is an unincorporated community and census-designated place (CDP) in Lake County, Montana, United States. As of the 2020 census, Dayton had a population of 104.

== Geography ==
Dayton is located in northwestern Lake County on the northwest shore of Flathead Lake, north of its Big Arm. U.S. Route 93 runs along the northern and western edges of the community, leading north 30 miles (48 km) to Kalispell and south 22 miles (35 km) to Polson, the Lake county seat.

According to the United States Census Bureau, the CDP has a total area of 0.54 square miles (1.4 km^{2}), of which 0.01 square miles (0.02 km^{2}), or 1.23%, are water.

== Demographics ==
Historical population
Census	Pop.	Note	%±
2020	104		—
U.S. Decennial Census

As of the census of 2000, there were 95 people, 48 households, and 28 families residing in the CDP. The population density was 177.0 inhabitants per square mile (68.3/km^{2}). There were 100 housing units at an average density of 186.3 per square mile (71.9/km^{2}). The racial makeup of the CDP was 93.68% White, 3.16% Native American, and 3.16% from two or more races.

There were 48 households, out of which 8.3% had children under the age of 18 living with them, 58.3% were married couples living together, and 39.6% were non-families. 31.3% of all households were made up of individuals, and 14.6% had someone living alone who was 65 years of age or older. The average household size was 1.98 and the average family size was 2.45.

In the CDP, the population was spread out, with 8.4% under the age of 18, 4.2% from 18 to 24, 17.9% from 25 to 44, 45.3% from 45 to 64, and 24.2% who were 65 years of age or older. The median age was 54 years. For every 100 females, there were 86.3 males. For every 100 females age 18 and over, there were 81.3 males.

The median income for a household in the CDP was $33,125, and the median income for a family was $42,500. Males had a median income of $15,833 versus $15,417 for females. The per capita income for the CDP was $18,501. None of the population and none of the families were below the poverty line.
