= List of Montana state parks =

Montana State Parks (Hover mouse over pog to popup clickable link)

This is a list of state parks and reserves in the Montana state park system, in the United States.

== Current parks ==
Name	Image	County	Size		Estab- lished	Lake / river	Remarks
Name	Image	County	acres	ha	Estab- lished	Lake / river	Remarks
Ackley Lake State Park		Judith Basin	290	120	1940	Ackley Lake	
Anaconda Smelter Stack State Park		Deer Lodge	12	4.9	1986	none	The park cannot actually be accessed, but only viewed from a distance.
Bannack State Park		Beaverhead	1,529	619	1954	Grasshopper Creek	The preserved ghost town of a one-time territorial capital.
Beaverhead Rock State Park		Madison	71	29	1975	Beaverhead River	
Beavertail Hill State Park		Missoula	65	26	1968	Clark Fork	
Big Arm State Park		Lake	217	88	1966	Flathead Lake	Unit of Flathead Lake State Park
Black Sandy State Park		Lewis and Clark	43	17	1980	Hauser Reservoir	
Brush Lake State Park		Sheridan	450	180	2004	Brush Lake	There are no fish in this lake due to the mineral makeup of the water.
Chief Plenty Coups State Park		Big Horn	195	79	1961	Pryor Creek	
Clark's Lookout State Park		Beaverhead	7	2.8	1985	Beaverhead River	
Cooney State Park		Carbon	309	125	1970	Cooney Reservoir	
Council Grove State Park		Missoula	187	76	1978	Clark Fork River	
Elkhorn State Park		Jefferson	1	0.40	1980	none	
Finley Point State Park		Lake	28	11	1965	Flathead Lake	Unit of Flathead Lake State Park
First Peoples Buffalo Jump State Park		Cascade	1,481	599	1972	none	Formerly Ulm Pishkun State Park
Fish Creek State Park		Mineral	6,200	2,500	2010	Fish Creek	
Fort Owen State Park		Ravalli	2	0.81	1956	Mill Creek	
Frenchtown Pond State Park		Missoula	41	17	1972	Frenchtown Pond	
Giant Springs State Park		Cascade	675	273	1972	Missouri River and Roe River	
Granite Ghost Town State Park		Granite	1	0.40	1975	none	Abandoned 1890s silver boomtown.
Greycliff Prairie Dog Town State Park		Sweet Grass	98	40	1974	none	
Hell Creek State Park		Garfield	337	136	1966	Fort Peck Lake	
Judith Landing State Park		Chouteau / Fergus	109	44	2025	Judith and Missouri rivers	Is part of larger Judith Landing Historic District.
Lake Elmo State Park		Yellowstone	183	74	1983	Lake Elmo	
Lake Mary Ronan State Park		Lake	120	49	1967	Flathead Lake	
Les Mason State Park		Flathead	8	3.2	1983	Whitefish Lake	
Lewis and Clark Caverns State Park		Jefferson	2,920	1,180	1935	none	
Logan State Park		Lincoln	18	7.3	1967	Middle Thompson Lake	
Lone Pine State Park		Flathead	251	102	1941	none	
Lost Creek State Park		Deer Lodge	502	203	1957	Lost Creek	
Milltown State Park		Missoula	635	257	2012	Clark Fork and Blackfoot rivers	
Madison Buffalo Jump State Park		Gallatin	638	258	1966	none	
Makoshika State Park		Dawson	11,634	4,708	1953	none	
Marias River State Park		Toole	2,011	814	2009	Marias River	
Medicine Rocks State Park		Carter	330	130	1957	none	
Missouri Headwaters State Park		Gallatin	532	215	1947	Jefferson, Madison, and Gallatin rivers	
North Shore State Park		Flathead	160	65	n/a	Flathead Lake	
Painted Rocks State Park		Ravalli	23	9.3	1963	Painted Rocks Reservoir, Bitterroot River	
Pictograph Cave State Park		Yellowstone	93	38	1969	none	
Pirogue Island State Park		Custer	210	85	1982	Yellowstone River	
Placid Lake State Park		Powell	31	13	1977	Placid Lake	
Rosebud Battlefield State Park		Big Horn	3,052	1,235	1978	none	
Salmon Lake State Park		Missoula	42	17	1977	Salmon Lake, Clearwater River	
Sluice Boxes State Park		Cascade	1,451	587	1974	Belt Creek	
Smith River State Park		Meagher	1	0.40	1960	Smith River	59-mile (95 km) segment of the river with only one public put-in and one public take-out for the entire stretch.
Somers Beach State Park		Flathead	106	43	2021	Flathead Lake	
Spring Meadow Lake State Park		Lewis and Clark	61	25	1981	Spring Meadow Lake	
Thompson Falls State Park		Sanders	36	15	1960	Clark Fork, Noxon Rapids Reservoir	
Tongue River Reservoir State Park		Big Horn	642	260	1983	Tongue River Reservoir	
Tower Rock State Park		Cascade	140	57	2004	Near Missouri River	
Travelers' Rest State Park		Missoula	41	17	2001	Lolo Creek	
Wayfarers State Park		Lake	67	27	1969	Flathead Lake	Unit of Flathead Lake State Park
West Shore State Park		Lake	129	52	1955	Flathead Lake	Unit of Flathead Lake State Park
Whitefish Lake State Park		Flathead	10	4.0	1960	Whitefish Lake	
Wild Horse Island State Park		Lake	2,164	876	1977	Flathead Lake	Unit of Flathead Lake State Park
Yellow Bay State Park		Lake	15	6.1	1941	Flathead Lake, Yellow Bay Creek	Unit of Flathead Lake State Park

== Former state parks ==
Parker Homestead State Park in Jefferson County reverted to private ownership in 2010.

== See also ==
- List of U.S. national parks
