= Yellow Bay State Park =

Park in Montana, USA

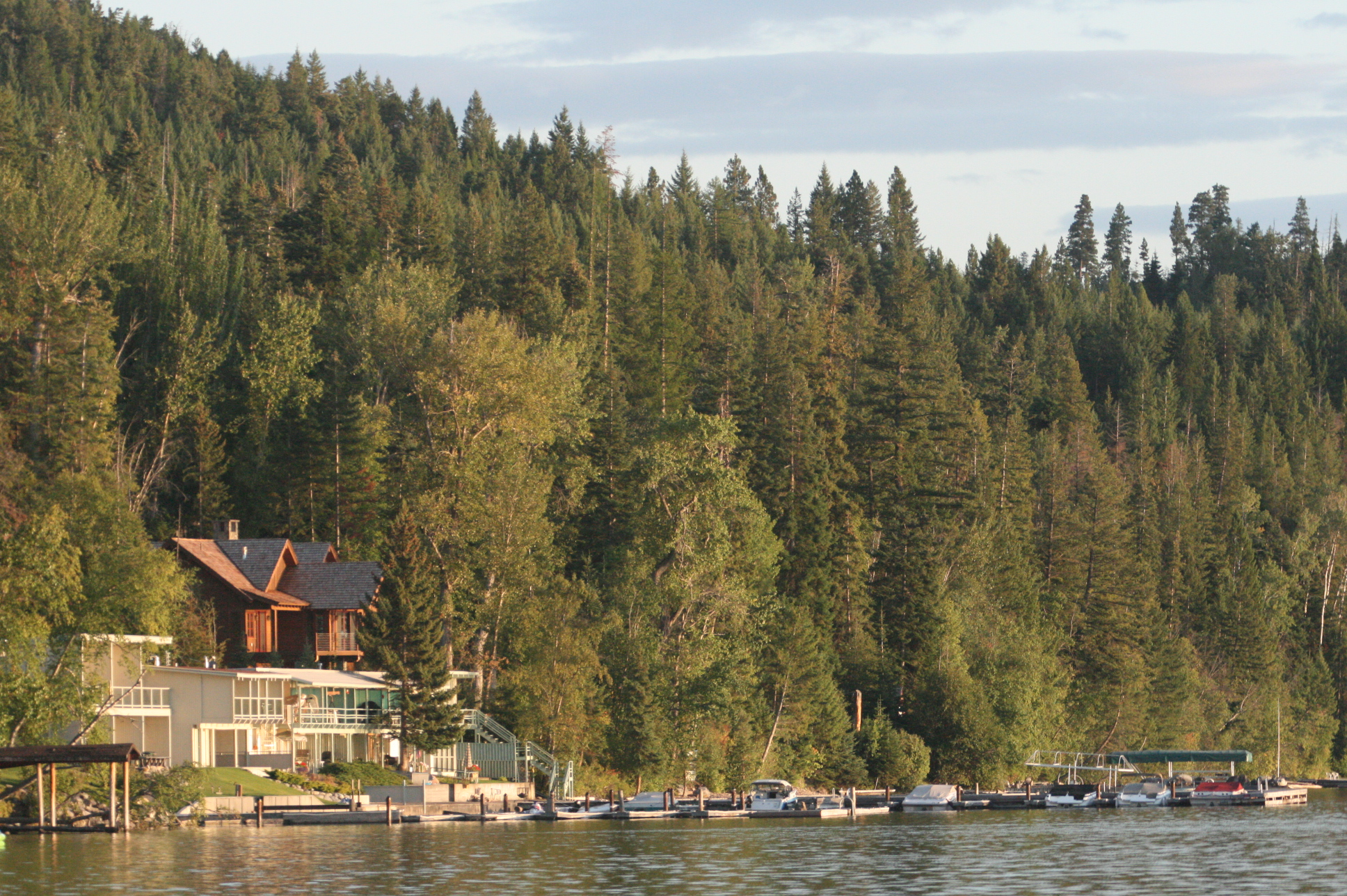

- Location within Montana
- Location: Lake County, Montana, United States
- Nearest town: Bigfork, Montana
- Coordinates: 47°52′35″N 114°01′58″W
- Area: 15 acres (6.1 ha)
- Elevation: 2,894 ft (882 m)
- Designation: Montana state park
- Established: 1941
- Administrator: Montana Fish, Wildlife & Parks
- Website: Yellow Bay State Park

Yellow Bay State Park is a public recreation area occupying fifteen acres (6.1 ha) on the eastern shore of Flathead Lake twelve miles (19 km) south of Bigfork in Lake County, Montana. The state park offers boating, fishing, camping, swimming, and wildlife viewing.
