= Thompson Falls State Park =

State park in Montana, United States

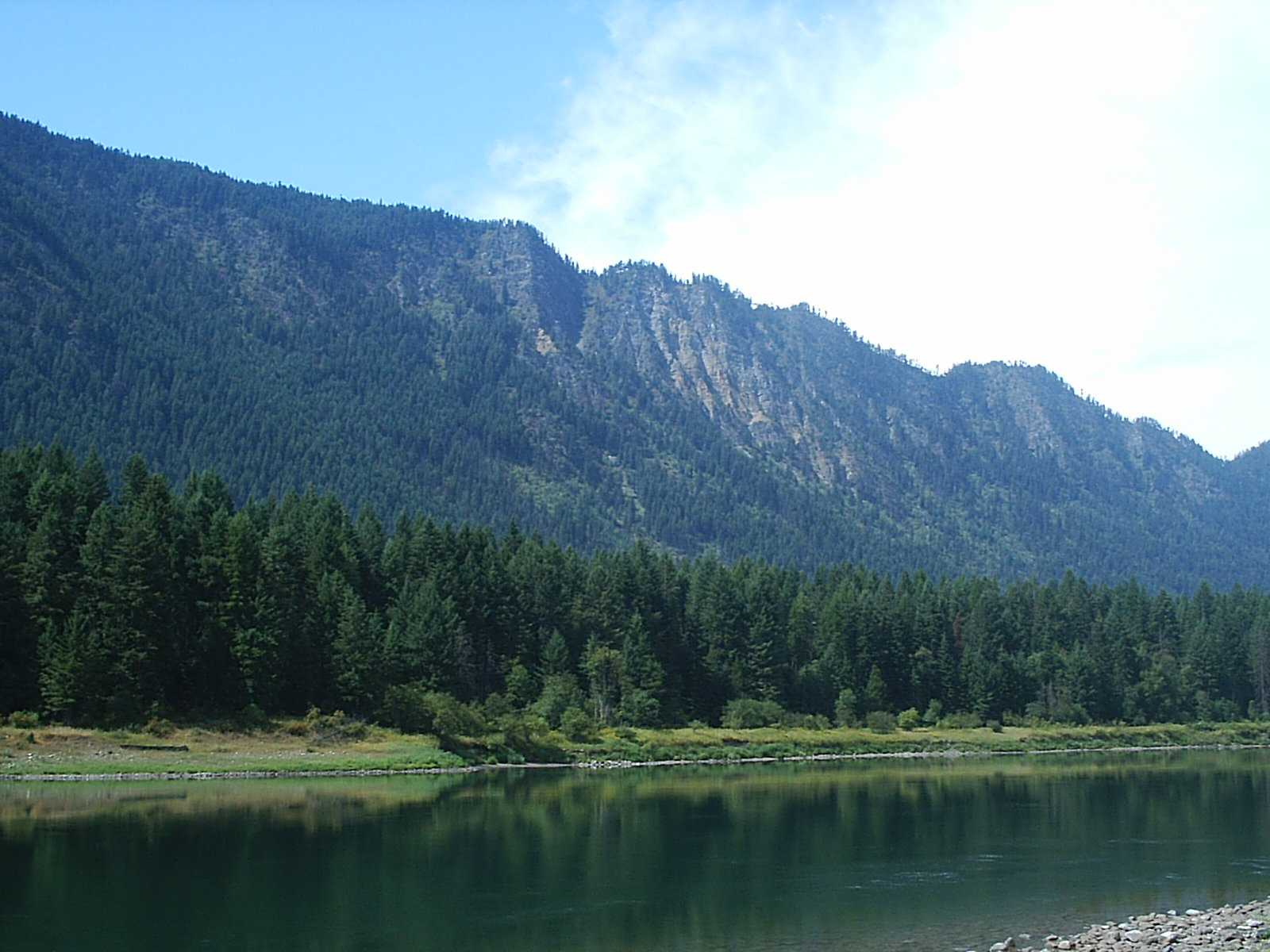
- Clark Fork River at Thompson Falls State Park

- Location within Montana
- Location: Sanders County, Montana, United States
- Nearest city: Thompson Falls, Montana
- Coordinates: 47°37′03″N 115°23′29″W
- Area: 36 acres (15 ha)
- Elevation: 2,333 ft (711 m)
- Designation: Montana state park
- Established: 1960
- Visitors: 36,059 (in 2023)
- Administrator: Montana Fish, Wildlife & Parks
- Website: Thompson Falls State Park

Thompson Falls State Park is a public recreation area occupying 36 acres (15 ha) on the banks of the Clark Fork River, two miles northwest of Thompson Falls, Montana. The state park features a boat launch, children's fishing pond, and riverside trail with mature pine forests surrounding 17 campsites, a group use area, picnicking facilities, birdwatching, and nature walks.
