= Lost Creek State Park =

Lost Creek State Park may refer to:

- Lost Creek State Park (Montana), a park in Deer Lodge County, Montana, United States
- Lost Creek State Park (Utah), a park in Morgan County, Utah, United States
