= Council Grove State Park =

State park in Montana, US

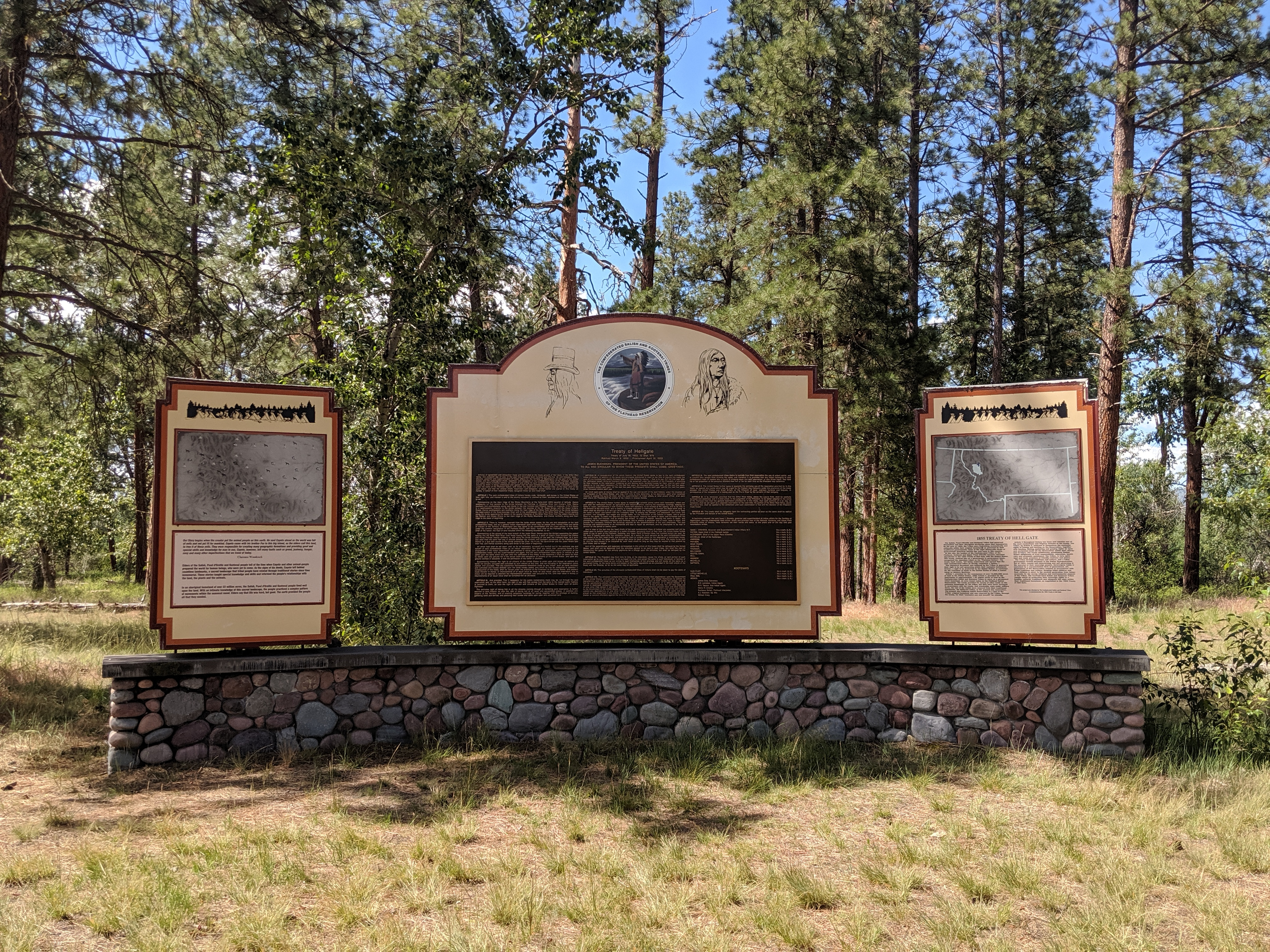
- Treaty of Hellgate Monument at Council Grove State Park

- Location within Montana
- Location: Missoula County, Montana, United States
- Nearest city: Missoula, Montana
- Coordinates: 46°54′45″N 114°09′03″W
- Area: 187 acres (76 ha)
- Elevation: 3,084 ft (940 m)
- Designation: Montana state park
- Established: 1978
- Visitors: 35,395 (in 2023)
- Administrator: Montana Fish, Wildlife & Parks
- Website: Council Grove State Park

Council Grove State Park (Salish: Člmé, "Tree Limb Cut Off," also Ncx̣͏ʷotew̓s) is a history-oriented, public recreation area located eight miles (13 km) northwest of Missoula in Missoula County, Montana. The site of the park hosted the signing on July 16, 1855, of the Hellgate treaty between representatives of the United States government and members of the Bitterroot Salish, Pend d'Oreille, and the Kootenai to create the Flathead Indian Reservation. A monument commemorates the signing. The park is 187 acres (76 ha) and sits at an elevation of 3,198 feet (975 m). Natural features found in the park are its large, old-growth ponderosa pines, grassy fields, and cottonwood stand by the Clark Fork River. Its recreational features include hiking and fishing.
