= Beavertail Hill State Park =

State park in Montana, USA

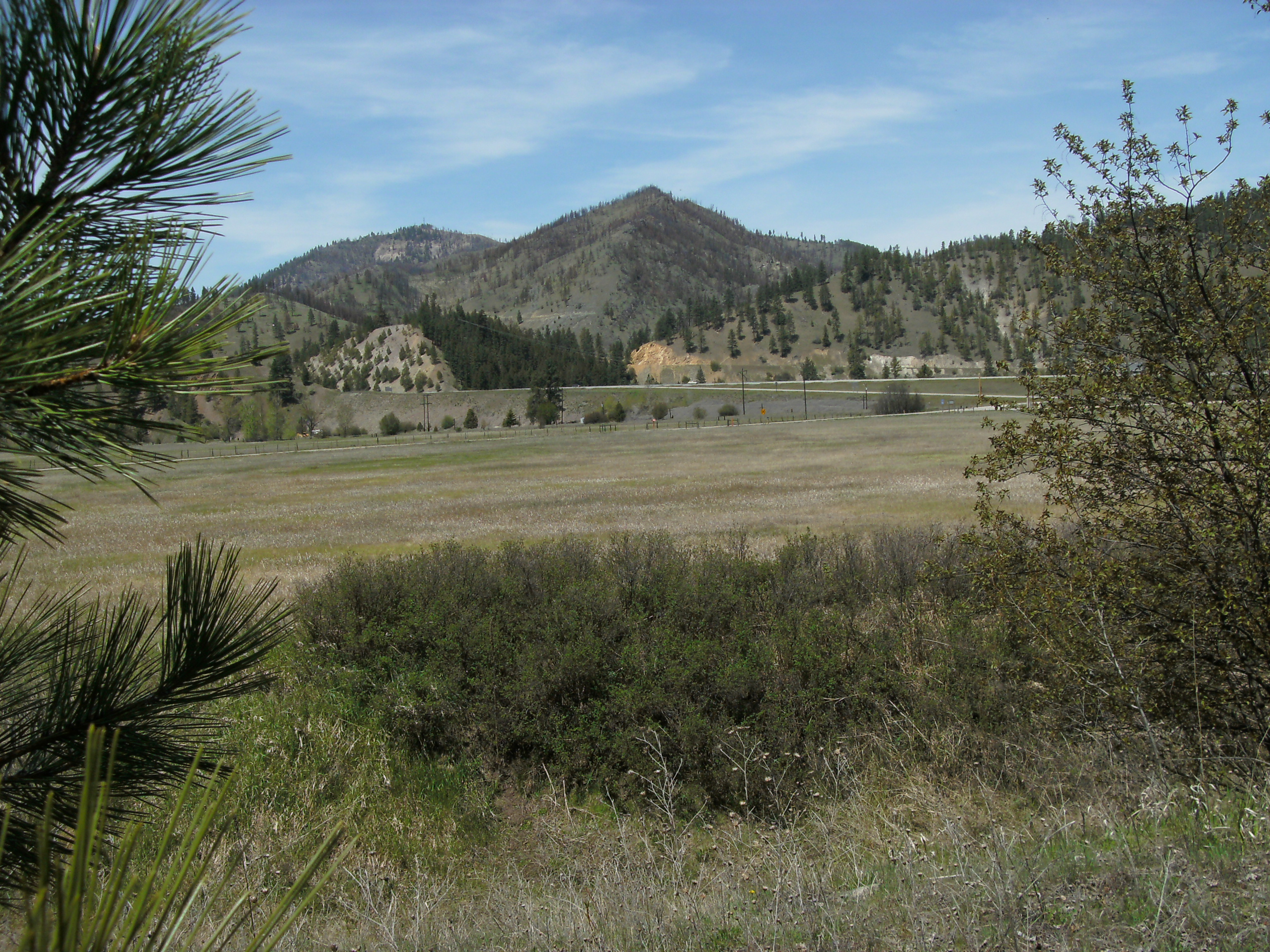

- Location within Montana
- Location: Missoula County, Montana, United States
- Nearest city: Missoula, Montana
- Coordinates: 46°43′12″N 113°34′48″W
- Area: 65 acres (26 ha)
- Elevation: 3,632 feet (1,107 m)
- Designation: Montana state park
- Established: 1968
- Visitors: 37,934 (in 2023)
- Administrator: Montana Fish, Wildlife & Parks
- Website: Beavertail Hill State Park

Beavertail Hill State Park is a public recreation area located on the Clark Fork River near Interstate 90, 26 miles (42 km) east of Missoula, Montana. The park covers 65 acres (26 ha), has an elevation of 3,615 feet, and offers river frontage, tipi rentals, a short interpretive trail, an amphitheatre, campsites, and picnic areas. The amphitheatre hosts interpretive programs on Friday evenings in summer. Fishing, rafting, and swimming in the Clark Fork River are possible. About 26 camping sites are available for tents or RVs up to 26 feet long.
