= Pirogue Island State Park =

State park in Montana, United States

- Location within Montana
- Location: Custer County, Montana, United States
- Nearest city: Miles City, Montana
- Coordinates: 46°26′26″N 105°49′02″W
- Area: 269 acres (109 ha)
- Elevation: 2,342 ft (714 m)
- Designation: Montana state park
- Established: 1982
- Visitors: 7,115 (in 2023)
- Administrator: Montana Fish, Wildlife & Parks
- Website: Pirogue Island State Park

Pirogue Island State Park is a public recreation area on an island in the Yellowstone River, two miles north of Miles City, Montana. The 269-acre (109 ha) state park has 2.8 miles (4.5 km) of designated hiking trails and, according to the Montana Department of Tourism, "[w]ildlife viewing, fishing for sauger, river floating, and Montana moss agate hunting are popular activities."
