= Marias River State Park =

Montana state park and wildlife area

Marias River State Park and Wildlife Management Area
- Interactive map of Marias River State Park and Wildlife Management Area
- Location: Toole County, Montana, United States
- Coordinates: 48.425709°N 111.982779°W
- Area: 5,845 acres (23.65 km^{2})
- Designation: Montana State Parks
- Established: May 1, 2009
- Governing body: Montana Department of Fish, Wildlife and Parks

Marias River State Park is a 5,845 acres (2,365 ha) property in Toole County, Montana, United States, established May 1, 2009. The site includes an undeveloped 14 miles (23 km) stretch of the Marias River, as well as sagebrush grassland and short grass prairie habitats in the uplands, consisting of a combination of Montana state park, and wildlife management area. One of the largest undeveloped stretches of river in the area, the Marias River is undisturbed by power lines, structures, or visibly irrigated land.

== History ==
Meriwether Lewis and his crew fled across the property in July 1806 after a fight with a band of Blackfeet warriors.

Charlie Lincoln previously owned the land which was known as the Lincoln Ranch. When Lincoln died, he left his ranch to the Catholic Diocese of Montana to give FWP the first right of refusal if the diocese decided to sell the land. The ranch was apraised at $7.38 million, with the FWP Commission and the state Land Board have approved the purchase price of $7.6 million. Most of the money for the acquisition comes from the Habitat Montana Program, which uses hunting license fees to conserve critical wildlife habitat through acquisitions and conservation easements. The remainder was funded by the Governor's Access Montana Initiative.

== Geography and wildlife ==
The park contains oxbow wetlands, sagebrush grasslands, and a river bottom cottonwood gallery. The park includes a wide range of habitats for waterfowl, mule deer, white-tailed deer, pheasants, Hungarian partridge, sharp-tailed grouse, raptors, and songbirds. The land likely also contains many wildlife species in greatest need of conservation, such as olive-sided flycatchers, snapping turtles, and spotted bats. The river holds burbot, northern pike, yellow perch, channel catfish, and walleye year-round. In the cooler months, there are also trout.

There is hunting and fishing access in the appropriate season and with the appropriate licenses.
