= Frenchtown, Montana =

- Census-designated place
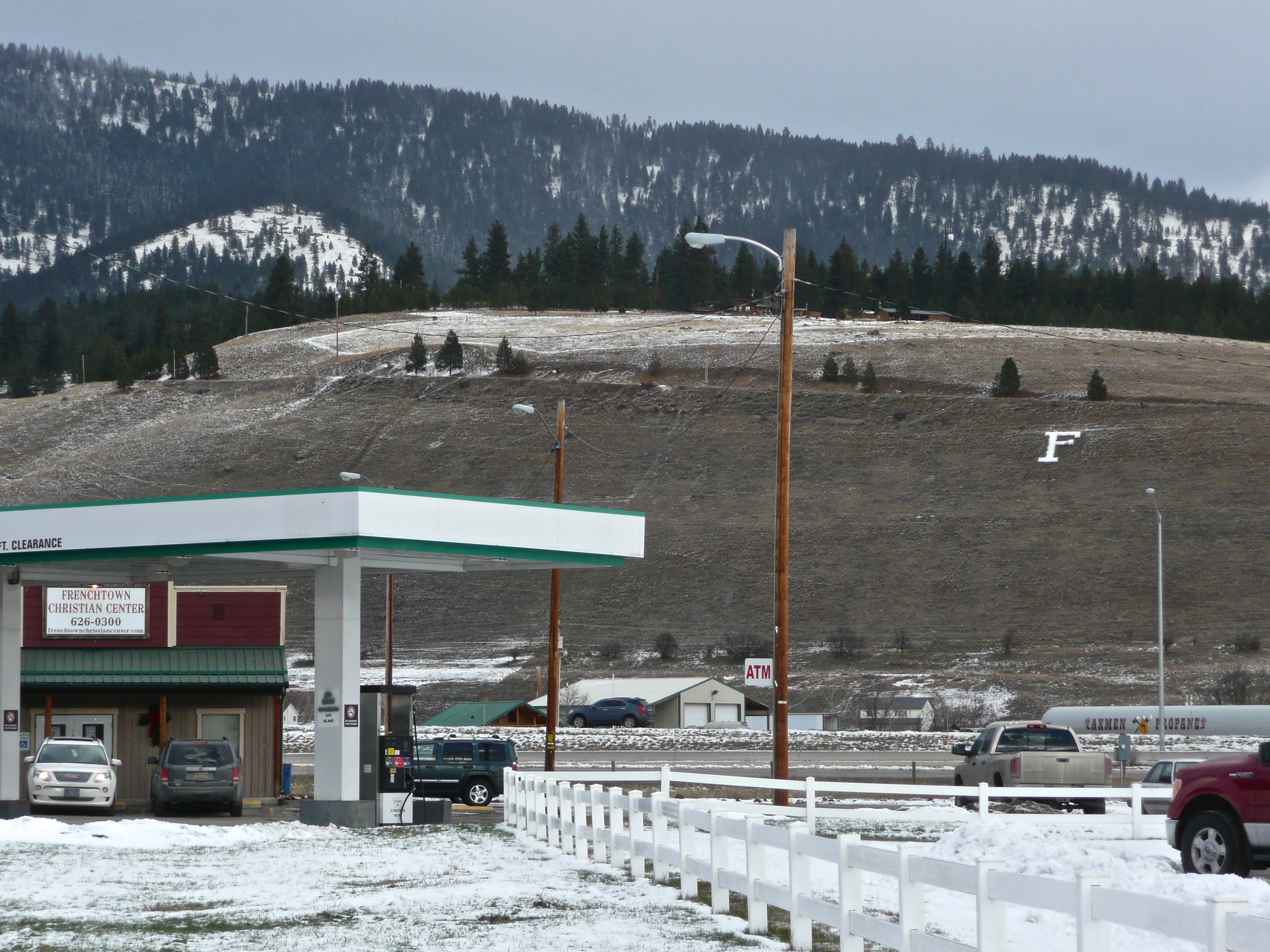

- Location in Missoula County and the state of Montana
- Coordinates: 47°01′57″N 114°15′26″W
- Country: United States
- State: Montana
- County: Missoula

Area
  - Total: 6.78 sq mi (17.55 km^{2})
  - Land: 6.74 sq mi (17.45 km^{2})
  - Water: 0.039 sq mi (0.10 km^{2})
- Elevation: 3,038 ft (926 m)

Population (2020)
  - Total: 1,958
  - Density: 290.7/sq mi (112.23/km^{2})
- Time zone: UTC-7 (Mountain (MST))
  - Summer (DST): UTC-6 (MDT)
- ZIP code: 59834
- Area code: 406
- FIPS code: 30-29350
- GNIS feature ID: 2408263

Frenchtown is an unincorporated community and census-designated place (CDP) in Missoula County, Montana, United States. It is part of the Missoula metropolitan area. The population was 1,958 as of the 2020 census.

== History ==
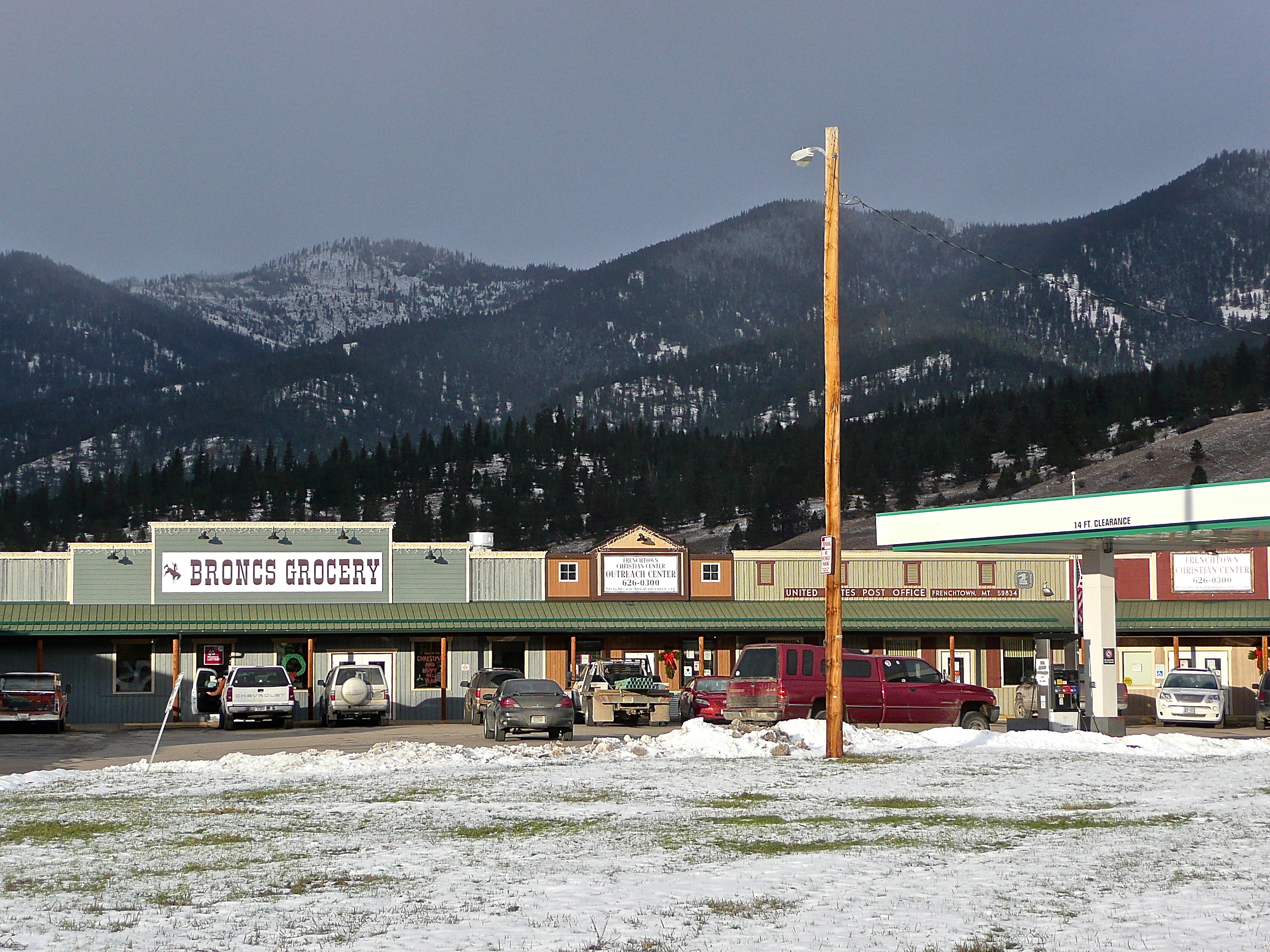
Grocery and post office

Early settlers gave the location a generic name based on the ethnicity or language of the original settlers, namely French Canadians.

The settlement was cofounded around 1858 by two French Canadians moving inland with their Métis families to escape turmoil further west that followed the arrival of the American federal authorities. Jean-Baptiste Ducharme left Puget Sound during the Indian Wars (1855-1856) abandoning his land claim as his Muck Creek neighbors were arrested under martial law. Louis Brown (anglicized name) left the Colville Valley turmoil a few years later with his Pend d'Oreille wife and their daughters. Meanwhile the Kalispel Indian Community had moved upriver to a new locale accompanied by Jesuit priest Father Hoecken, who relocated the Saint-Ignatius mission northeast of the future Frenchtown.

The St. Louis Catholic Church was built in 1864.

A post office called Frenchtown was first established in 1868.

== Geography ==
Frenchtown is located in northwestern Missoula County on the historic Mullan Road. Interstate 90 now passes through the community, with access from Exit 89. I-90 leads southeast 16 miles (26 km) to Missoula and northwest 42 miles (68 km) to Superior.

Frenchtown Pond State Park is in the western part of the community. The 18-acre (7.3 ha) pond is a popular site for swimming and paddling sports. It offers four-season fishing for bass, perch and hatchery trout.

South of town is the Clark Fork River and the foothills of the Bitterroot Mountains.

According to the U.S. Census Bureau, the Frenchtown CDP has a total area of 6.78 square miles (17.6 km^{2}), of which 0.04 square miles (0.10 km^{2}), or 0.59%, are water. Mill Creek passes through the center of Frenchtown, while Roman Creek and Houle Creek cross the western portion of the CDP. All three creeks are tributaries of the Clark Fork to the south.

== Demographics ==
Historical population
Census	Pop.	Note	%±
2000	883		—
2010	1,825		106.7%
2020	1,958		7.3%
U.S. Decennial Census

=== 2020 census ===
As of the 2020 census, Frenchtown had a population of 1,958. The median age was 40.6 years. 25.1% of residents were under the age of 18 and 18.1% of residents were 65 years of age or older. For every 100 females there were 110.5 males, and for every 100 females age 18 and over there were 110.0 males age 18 and over.

0.0% of residents lived in urban areas, while 100.0% lived in rural areas.

There were 732 households in Frenchtown, of which 32.5% had children under the age of 18 living in them. Of all households, 62.7% were married-couple households, 15.4% were households with a male householder and no spouse or partner present, and 15.0% were households with a female householder and no spouse or partner present. About 19.5% of all households were made up of individuals and 9.7% had someone living alone who was 65 years of age or older.

There were 753 housing units, of which 2.8% were vacant. The homeowner vacancy rate was 0.0% and the rental vacancy rate was 4.3%.

Racial composition as of the 2020 census
Race	Number	Percent
White	1,735	88.6%
Black or African American	6	0.3%
American Indian and Alaska Native	38	1.9%
Asian	17	0.9%
Native Hawaiian and Other Pacific Islander	1	0.1%
Some other race	11	0.6%
Two or more races	150	7.7%
Hispanic or Latino (of any race)	48	2.5%

=== 2010 census ===
As of the census of 2010, there were 1,825 people, 291 households, and 235 families residing in the CDP. The population density was 271.8 inhabitants per square mile (104.9/km^{2}). There were 302 housing units at an average density of 92.9 per square mile (35.9/km^{2}). The racial makeup of the CDP was 96.15% White, 1.59% Native American, 0.11% Asian, 0.79% from other races, and 1.36% from two or more races. Hispanic or Latino of any race were 1.81% of the population.

There were 291 households, out of which 47.4% had children under the age of 18 living with them, 67.0% were married couples living together, 7.9% had a female householder with no husband present, and 19.2% were non-families. 12.7% of all households were made up of individuals, and 4.1% had someone living alone who was 65 years of age or older. The average household size was 3.03 and the average family size was 3.32.

In the CDP, the population was spread out, with 34.3% under the age of 18, 6.5% from 18 to 24, 31.3% from 25 to 44, 22.7% from 45 to 64, and 5.3% who were 65 years of age or older. The median age was 34 years. For every 100 females, there were 106.3 males. For every 100 females age 18 and over, there were 101.4 males.

The median income for a household in the CDP was $46,094, and the median income for a family was $45,938. Males had a median income of $36,118 versus $23,750 for females. The per capita income for the CDP was $21,225. None of the population or families were below the poverty line.

== Smurfit-Stone mill ==
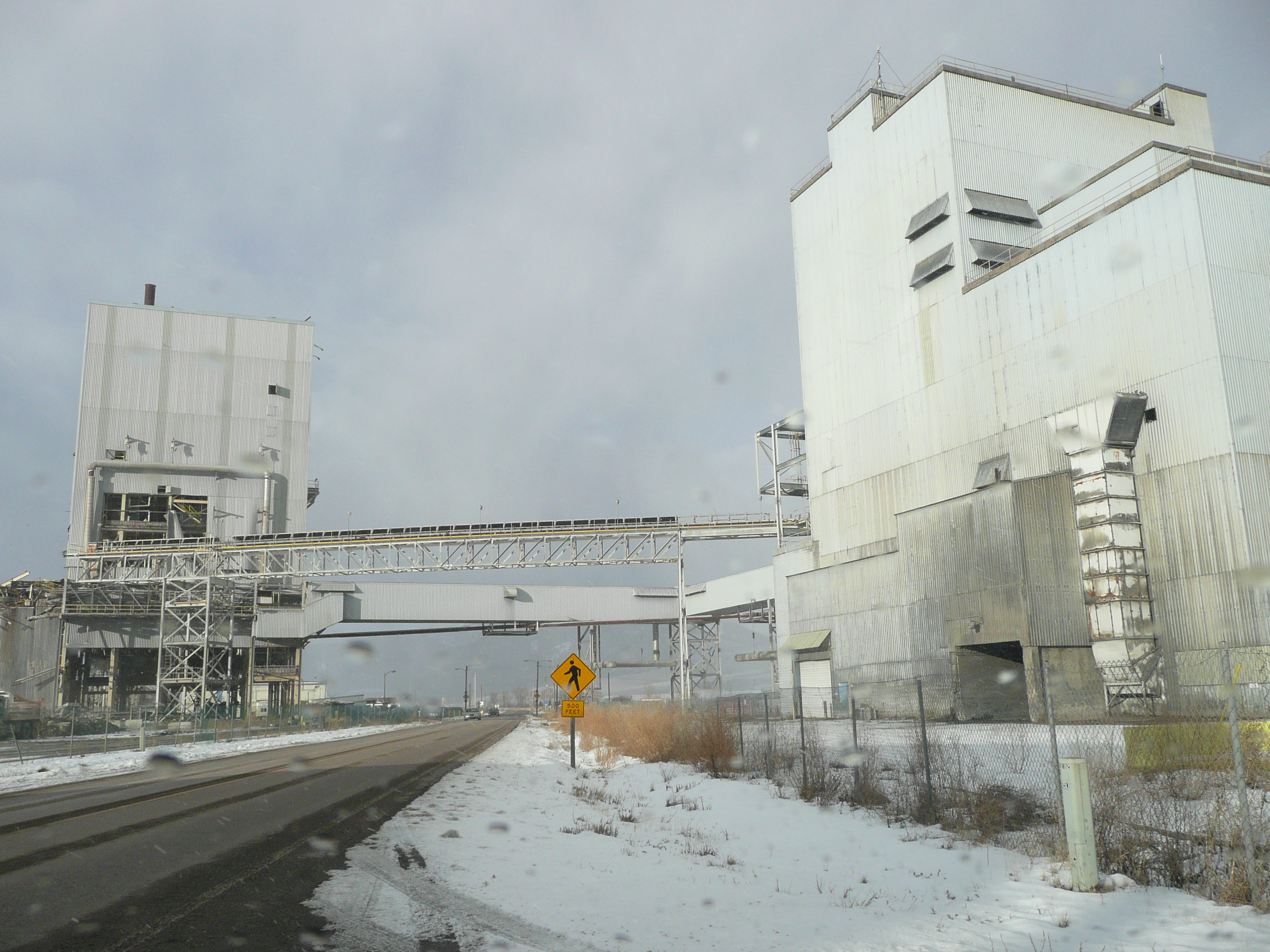
Smurfit-Stone, Frenchtown, MT

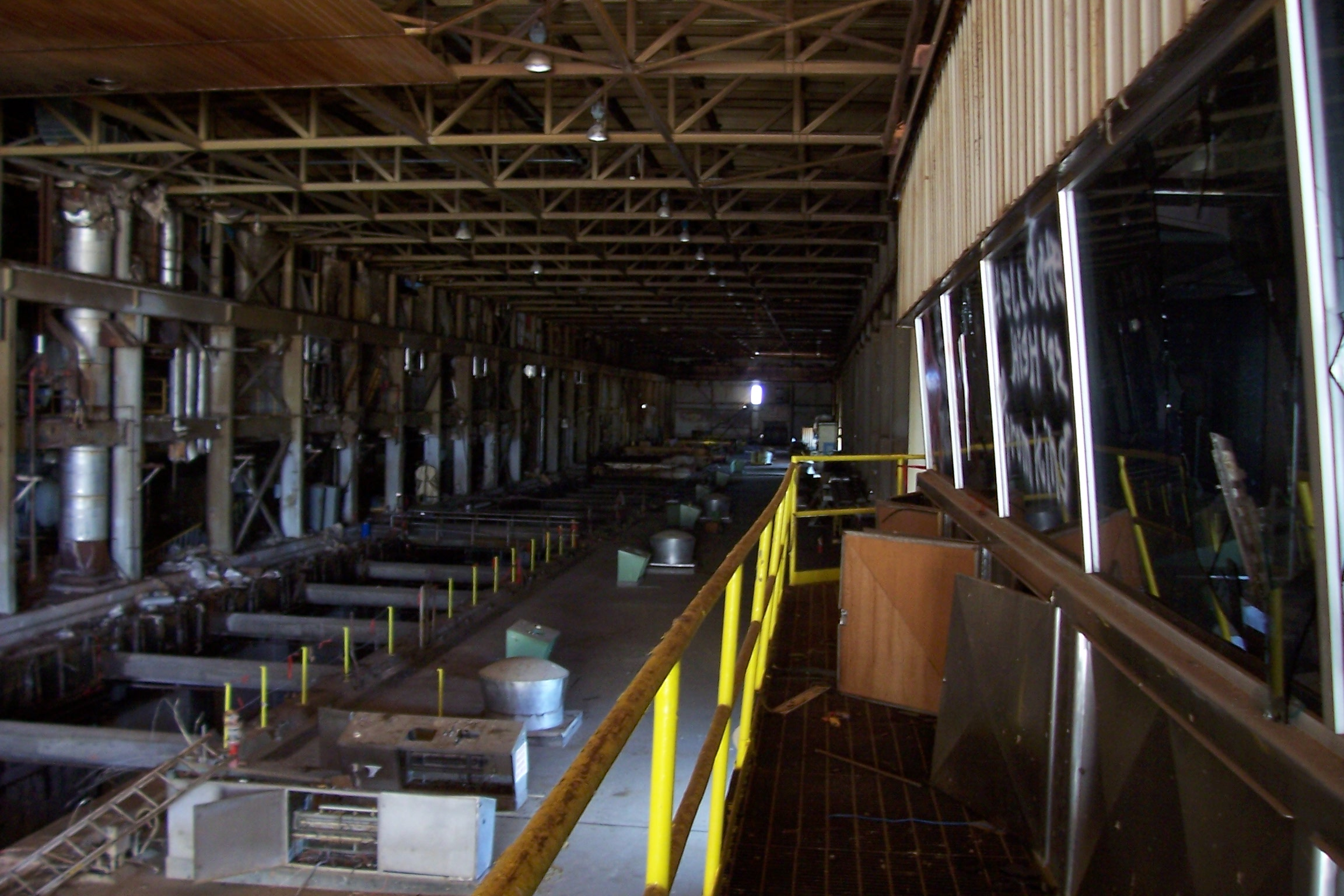
View of main equipment hall from control room balcony, September 2020.

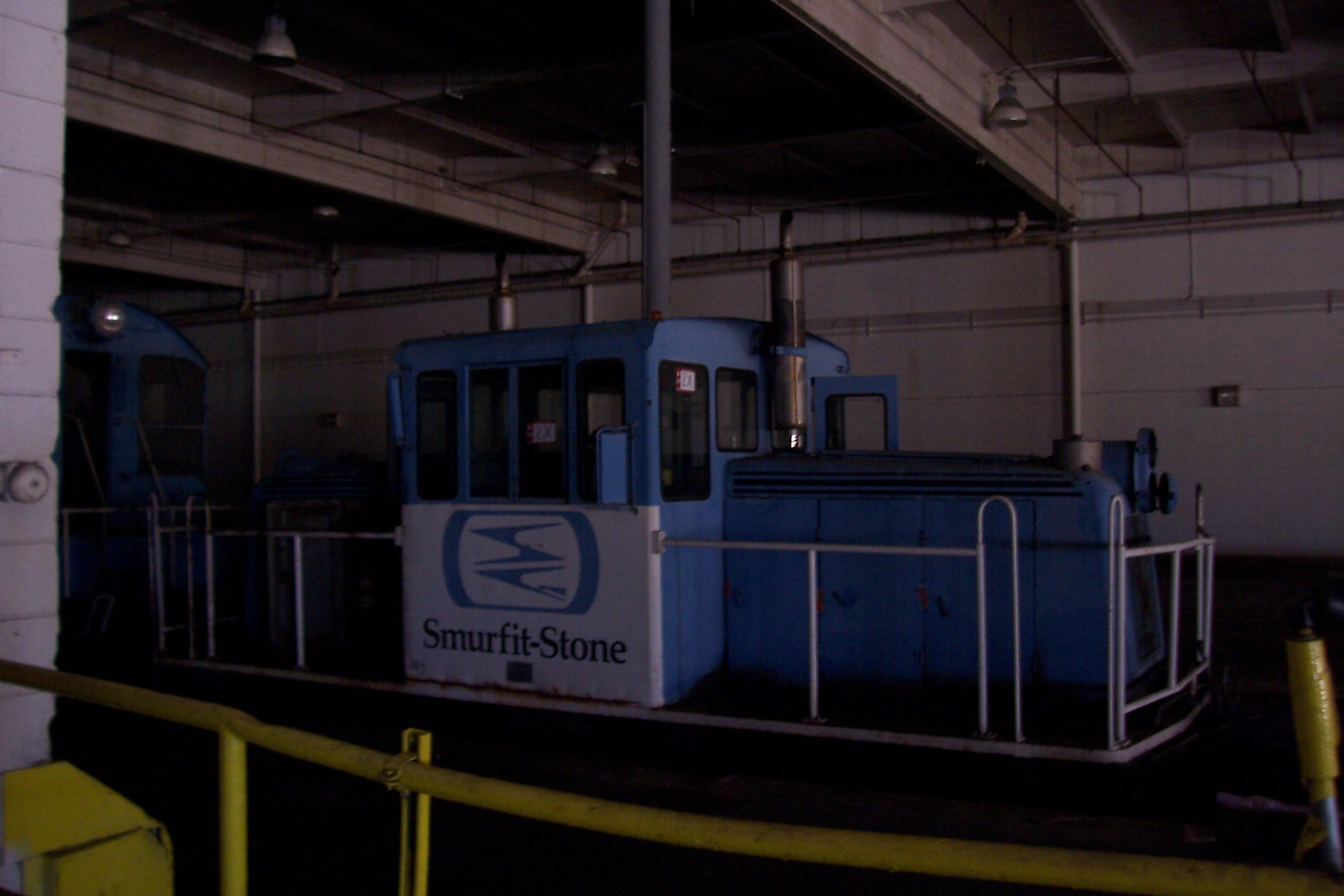
A small diesel locomotive abandoned at the mill's loading docks.

In September 2015, the EPA announced that it was close to an agreement for testing and environmental remediation of Frenchtown's Smurfit-Stone Container Corp. mill site. Contaminants on the site include dioxins and heavy metals, which has raised concerns that the site might be eligible for the federal Superfund list. The paper mill, which produced containerboard, "began production in 1957 under Waldorf Paper Products Co. of St. Paul, MN." The mill employed 417 workers at the time of its closure in 2010. A meeting was held in February 2017 to create a Community Advisory Group to work with the Superfund grantmaking process. Cleanup of PCBs at the mill site was ongoing as of April 2017. As the second largest taxpayer in Missoula county, the mill was the source of nearly 20% ($134281) of the Frenchtown fire district's budget, and 21.7% ($825,976) of the Frenchtown school district's budget.

== Arts and culture ==
Old Bull Brewing is included in the Montana Brewers Association Trail Map.

The Missoula Public Library has a branch location in Frenchtown.

== Education ==
Frenchtown Public Schools, a unified K-12 school district which covers all of the CDP, serves all grade levels for the community The district had 1,463 students enrolled for the 2021-2022 school year. Frenchtown High School's team name is the Broncs.

== Media ==
Missoula Community Radio owns the station KFGM-FM, which is licensed in Frenchtown.

The newspaper provider is the Missoulian, based in nearby Missoula.

== Infrastructure ==
Interstate 90 runs through the southern part of the community. The intersection of US Route 93 with I-90 is 8 miles (13 km) to the southeast in Wye.

The nearest airport is the Missoula Montana Airport, 10 miles (16 km) to the southeast of Frenchtown.

== Notable people ==
- Chris La Tray (born 1967), writer and Montana Poet Laureate (2023-2024)
