= Spring Meadows =

Spring Meadows may refer to:

- Spring Meadows, New Jersey
- Spring Meadows Elementary School
- Spring Meadow Lake State Park
- Spring Meadows, Alderman's Head & Cow Croft Meadows
