= Salmon Lake State Park =

State park in Montana, United States

- Location within Montana
- Location: Missoula County, Montana, United States
- Nearest city: Missoula, Montana
- Coordinates: 47°05′35″N 113°23′48″W
- Area: 42 acres (17 ha)
- Elevation: 3,934 feet (1,199 m)
- Designation: Montana state park
- Established: 1977
- Visitors: 47,737 (in 2023)
- Governing body: Montana Department of Fish, Wildlife and Parks
- Website: Salmon Lake State Park

Salmon Lake State Park is a public recreation area located approximately 32 miles (51 km) northeast of Missoula, Montana. The state park occupies 42 acres (17 ha) on the eastern side of Salmon Lake in the Clearwater River chain between the Mission and Swan mountain ranges.

== History ==
The Champion Timberlands Corporation donated land for the park in 1977 to commemorate three foresters who died in a plane crash near Kalispell the year before.

== Natural features ==
The lake is surrounded by largely woodland mountains, with ponderosa pine, western larch, and douglas fir being the dominant tree species. Species of fish found in Salmon Lake and the connected waterways include rainbow, cutthroat, brown, brook and bull trout, largemouth bass, white mountain whitefish, kokanee salmon, yellow perch and northern pike. Birds that may be spotted include rednecked grebes, great blue herons, bald eagles, ospreys, common loons, and other species of waterfowl.

== Activities and amenities ==
Park facilities include a swimming area, boat ramp, and campsites.
