= Cooney State Park =

State park in Montana, US

- Location within Montana
- Location: Carbon County, Montana, United States
- Nearest town: Columbus, Montana
- Coordinates: 45°26′25″N 109°12′53″W
- Area: 309 acres (125 ha)
- Elevation: 4,268 ft (1,301 m)
- Designation: Montana state park
- Established: 1970
- Visitors: 148,344 (in 2023)
- Administrator: Montana Fish, Wildlife & Parks
- Website: Cooney State Park

Cooney State Park is a public recreation area bordering Cooney Reservoir, fourteen miles (23 km) south of Columbus in Carbon County, Montana. The state park occupies 309 acres (125 ha) on three sides of the reservoir, a 1,078-acre (436 ha) impoundment of Red Lodge Creek completed in 1937. The park offers boating, fishing, swimming, picnicking, and camping.
