= Finley Point State Park =

Park in Montana, USA

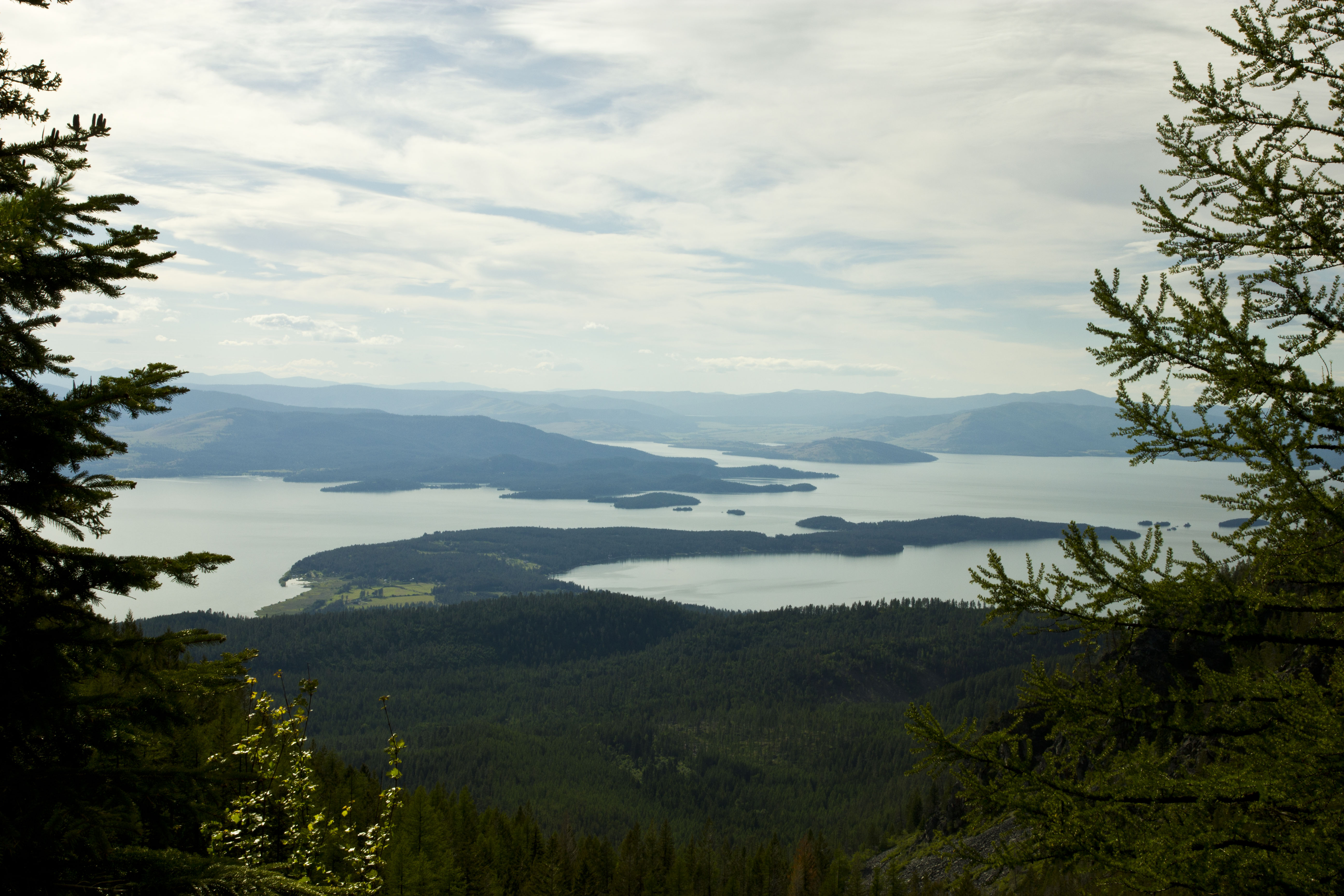
- View of Flathead Lake with the Finley Point peninsula seen jutting into the lake

- Location within Montana
- Location: Flathead County, Montana, United States
- Nearest town: Finley Point, Montana
- Coordinates: 47°45′50″N 114°04′43″W
- Area: 28 acres (11 ha)
- Elevation: 2,940 ft (900 m)
- Designation: Montana state park
- Established: 1965
- Administrator: Montana Fish, Wildlife & Parks
- Website: Finley Point State Park

Finley Point State Park is a 28-acre (11 ha) public recreation area in Montana on the Finley Point peninsula at the southern end of Flathead Lake, approximately ten miles east of the community of Big Arm. The state park offers facilities for both RV and tent camping, as well as boat camping slips.
