= Lone Pine State Park =

State park in Montana, USA

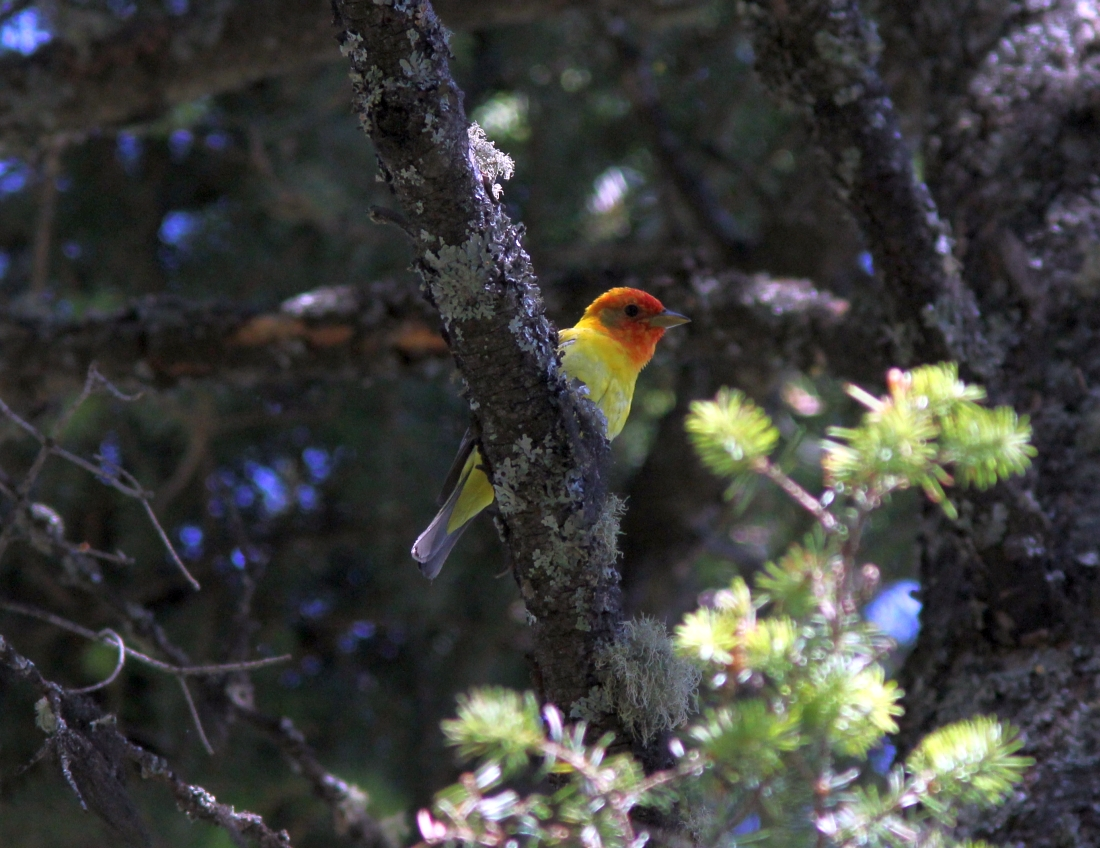
- Western tanager at Lone Pine State Park

- Location within Montana
- Location: Kalispell, Montana, United States
- Coordinates: 48°10′43″N 114°20′29″W
- Area: 270 acres (110 ha)
- Elevation: 3,396 ft (1,035 m)
- Max. elevation: 3,644 ft (1,111 m)
- Min. elevation: 2,959 ft (902 m)
- Designation: Montana state park
- Established: 1941
- Visitors: 132,054 (in 2023)
- Administrator: Montana Fish, Wildlife & Parks
- Website: Lone Pine State Park

Lone Pine State Park is a public recreation area on the southwest side of Kalispell, Montana, United States. The day-use state park's 270 acres (110 ha) include 7.5 miles (12.1 km) of trails for hiking, mountain biking, snowshoeing, and horseback riding.

== History ==
The park's original 162 acres were donated to the state in 1941 by Ernest and Hazel White. The Whites stipulated that the land be developed for public use and to teach an appreciation for the benefits of conservation.
