= Black Sandy State Park =

State park in Montana, USA

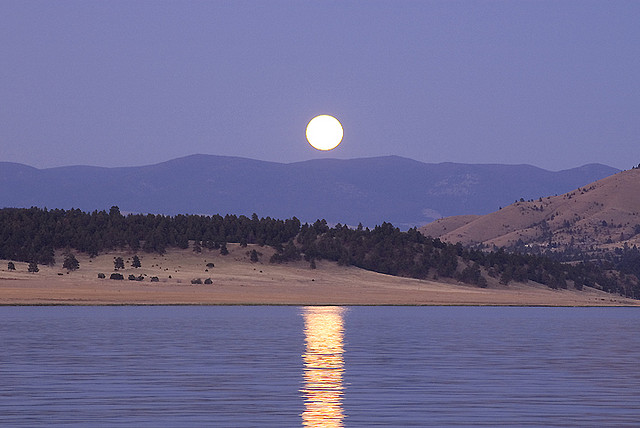
- Moonrise over Hauser Lake near Black Sandy

- Location within Montana
- Location: Lewis and Clark County, Montana, United States
- Nearest city: Helena, Montana
- Coordinates: 46°45′25″N 111°53′23″W
- Area: 43 acres (17 ha)
- Elevation: 3,904 ft (1,190 m)
- Designation: Montana state park
- Established: 1980
- Visitors: 43,966 (in 2023)
- Administrator: Montana Fish, Wildlife & Parks
- Website: Black Sandy State Park

Black Sandy State Park is a public recreation area on the western shore of Hauser Lake reservoir, an impoundment of the Missouri River, located thirteen miles (21 km) northeast of Helena in Lewis and Clark County, Montana, in the United States. The park is along the Lewis and Clark National Historic Trail.

== History ==
Prior to 1980, Montana Power Company owned the land and operated the park as a recreation area. In 1980, the company turned over management of the park to the Montana Department of Fish, Wildlife and Parks (FWP). In 1982, it was designated a state recreation area. Subsequently, the land was also turned over to FWP.

== Activities and amenities ==
Recreational activities available at the park include hiking, tent and RV camping, swimming, picnicking, fishing, boating, and water skiing. Fish species include rainbow and brown trout, walleye, and perch.

== In the news ==
In 2012, a prefabricated concrete office building was proposed to replace a wooden 8 by 12 feet (2.4 m × 3.7 m) building with a 16 by 24 feet (4.9 m × 7.3 m) concrete building with internet access at a cost of $40,000.

== Adjoining property ==
Just south of the park, the White Sandy Recreation Area operated by the United States Bureau of Land Management has campsites and other amenities.
