= Les Mason State Park =

State park in Montana, United States

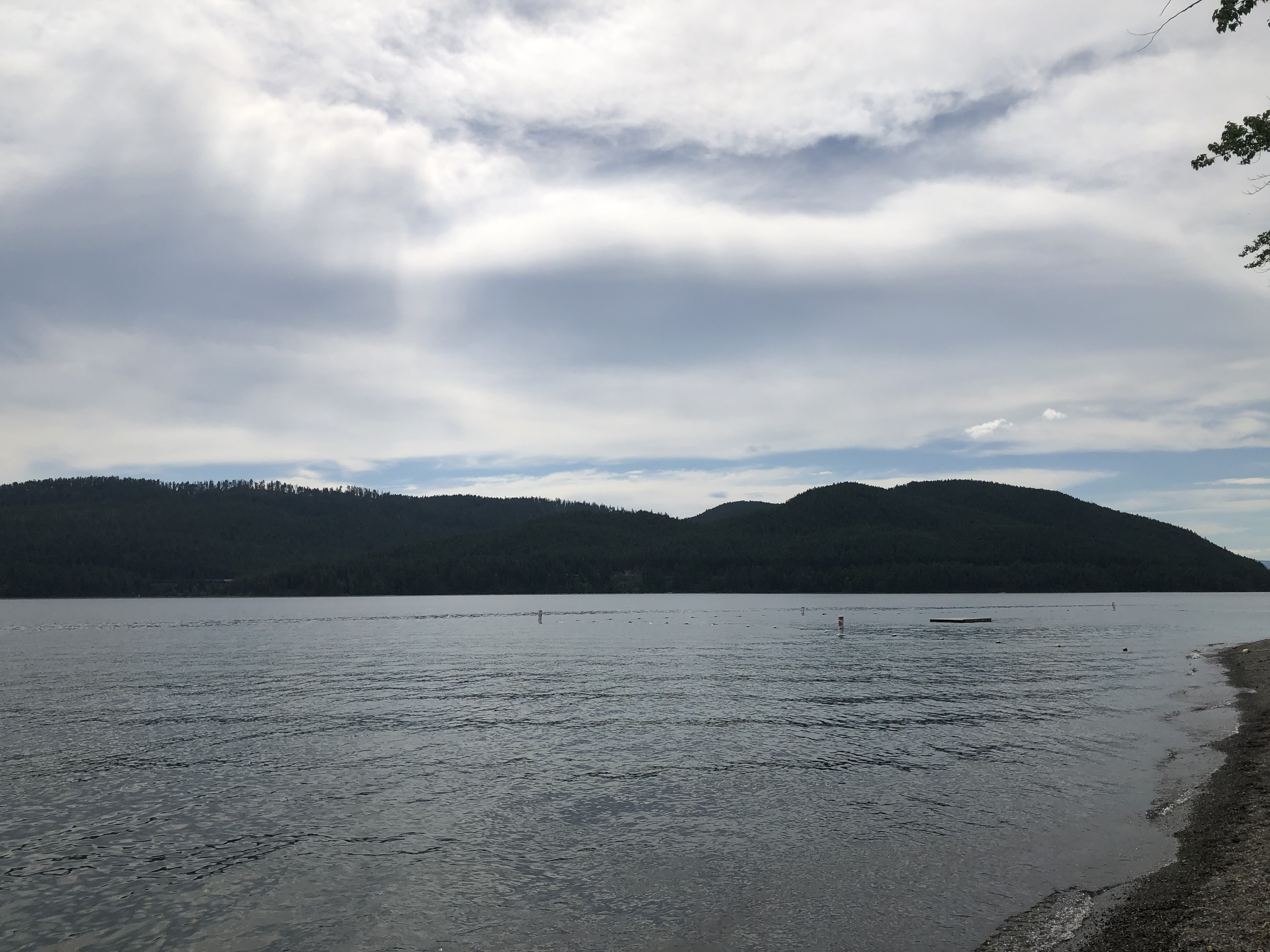
- Les Mason State Park swim area

- Location within Montana
- Location: Flathead County, Montana, United States
- Nearest city: Whitefish, Montana
- Coordinates: 48°27′32″N 114°22′20″W
- Area: 8 acres (3.2 ha)
- Elevation: 3,041 ft (927 m)
- Designation: Montana state park
- Established: 1983
- Visitors: 92,596 (in 2023)
- Administrator: Montana Fish, Wildlife & Parks
- Website: Les Mason State Park

Les Mason State Park is a public recreation area on the east shore of Whitefish Lake, four miles north of Whitefish, Montana. The day-use state park encompasses eight acres that include a 585-foot sand and gravel beach, short walking trails, and facilities for swimming, canoeing, and picnicking.
