= Granite, Montana =

Ghost town in Granite County, Montana, United States

Granite Ghost Town State Park
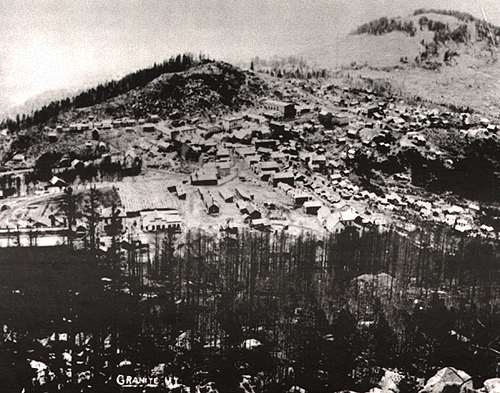
- The city of Granite ca. 1895

- Location within Montana
- Location: Granite, Montana, United States
- Nearest town: Philipsburg, Montana
- Coordinates: 46°19′03″N 113°14′40″W
- Area: 0.6 acres (0.24 ha)
- Elevation: 7,001 ft (2,134 m)
- Designation: Montana state park
- Established: 1875
- Visitors: 6,878 (in 2023)
- Administrator: Montana Fish, Wildlife & Parks
- Website: Granite Ghost Town State Park

Granite is a ghost town in Granite County, Montana, United States, three miles east of the town of Philipsburg. Granite thrived as a silver mining town in the 1890s and is now completely deserted. The state of Montana maintains the mine superintendent's house and the ruins of the union hall as Granite Ghost Town State Park.

== History ==
In 1872, Eli Holland found a small quantity of high quality ruby silver in the area. A shallow shaft was dug, but later abandoned until 1877, when Charles McLure discovered some silver ore in the shaft. He later traveled to St. Louis to obtain the capital necessary to begin development of the mine.

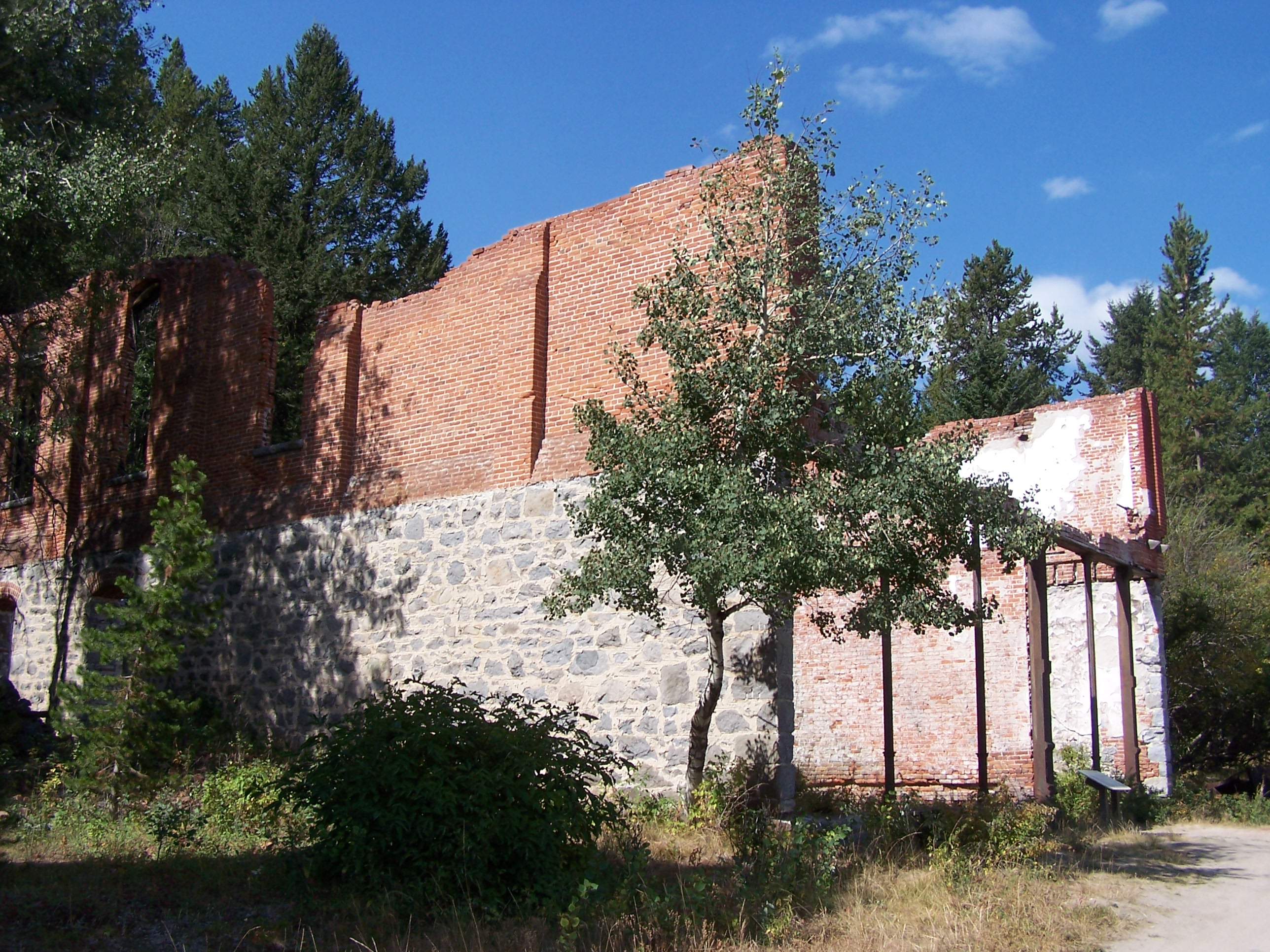
Remnant of Miners Union Hall, Granite, Montana

Granite eventually grew to a town with more than 3,000 inhabitants. For the time period, there were many modern amenities, such as the large Miners Union Hall, a library, 18 saloons, brothels, a hospital and school as well as churches.

The Sherman Silver Purchase Act was repealed in 1893, drastically lowering the price of silver, and many residents left Granite, leaving only 140 residents a year later. Granite is currently entirely uninhabited.
