= Placid Lake State Park =

State park in Montana, United States

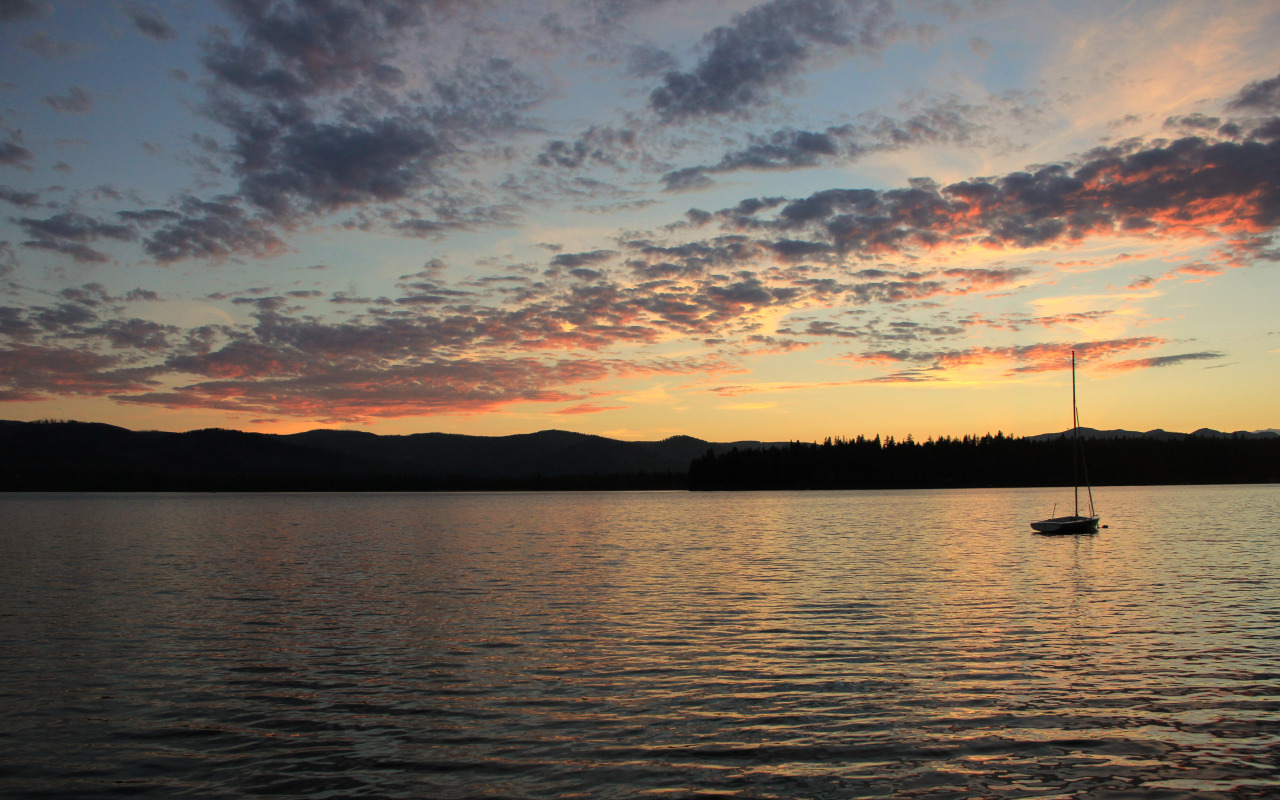
- Sunset over Placid Lake

- Location within Montana
- Location: Missoula County, Montana, United States
- Nearest city: Missoula, Montana
- Coordinates: 47°07′11″N 113°30′10″W
- Area: 31 acres (13 ha)
- Elevation: 4,124 ft (1,257 m)
- Designation: Montana state park
- Established: 1977
- Visitors: 60,579 (in 2023)
- Administrator: Montana Fish, Wildlife & Parks
- Website: Placid Lake State Park

Placid Lake State Park is a public recreation area located 28 miles (45 km) northeast of Missoula, Montana. The state park sits on 31 acres (13 ha) at the eastern end of Placid Lake that include the lake's outlet to Owl Creek, a tributary of the Clearwater River. The park is known for its scenery, camping, aquatic recreation, and fishing.

== History ==
Placid Lake was named after the Adirondack Mountains' Lake Placid by Hiram Blanchard, a New Yorker who moved to the area in 1892 to form the Clearwater Land and Livestock Company. A dam was completed below the lake's Owl Creek outlet in 1972, and the park was created in 1977.

== Activities and amenities ==
Park facilities include a swimming area, campsites, and boat launch. The park offers an opportunity to view rednecked grebes, ospreys, common loons, and other species of waterfowl.
