= Brush Lake State Park =

State park in Montana, USA

- Location within Montana
- Location: Sheridan County, Montana, United States
- Nearest town: Dagmar, Montana
- Coordinates: 48°36′10″N 104°6′46″W
- Area: 450 acres (180 ha)
- Elevation: 1,959 ft (597 m)
- Designation: Montana state park
- Established: 2004
- Visitors: 35,510 (in 2023)
- Administrator: Montana Fish, Wildlife & Parks
- Website: Brush Lake State Park

Brush Lake State Park is a public recreation area located four miles east of the community of Dagmar, Montana. The park surrounds three sides of the highly alkaline, 280-acre (110 ha), sixty-foot-deep Brush Lake.

== History ==
Brush Lake became a popular gathering place in the early years of the twentieth century, when residents of the surrounding communities were drawn to its clear, deep, spring-fed waters. Hans Christian Hansen built a summer resort on the lake after filing homesteading papers in 1914. A bar and cafe were added to the site by 1920, with a dance hall added in the 1940s. In 2004, the state purchased 450 acres surrounding the northern half of the lake to create a state park, while the lake's southern portion remained in private hands.

== Activities and amenities ==
The park offers hiking, swimming, picnicking and camping facilities as well as opportunities for boating and canoeing. The lake's high mineral content makes it inhospitable to fish life.
