= Frenchtown Pond State Park =

State park in Montana, USA

- Location within Montana
- Location: Missoula County, Montana, United States
- Nearest city: Missoula, Montana
- Coordinates: 47°01′28″N 114°15′28″W
- Area: 41 acres (17 ha)
- Elevation: 3,028 ft (923 m)
- Designation: Montana state park
- Established: 1972
- Visitors: 47,256 (in 2023)
- Administrator: Montana Fish, Wildlife & Parks
- Website: Frenchtown Pond State Park

Frenchtown Pond State Park is a public recreation area located ten miles (16 km) northwest of Missoula in Frenchtown, Montana. The 41-acre (17 ha) day-use state park offers fishing, swimming, and non-motorized boating on a small, spring-fed lake with a maximum eighteen-foot (5.5 m) depth.
