= Lake Mary Ronan State Park =

State park in Montana, USA

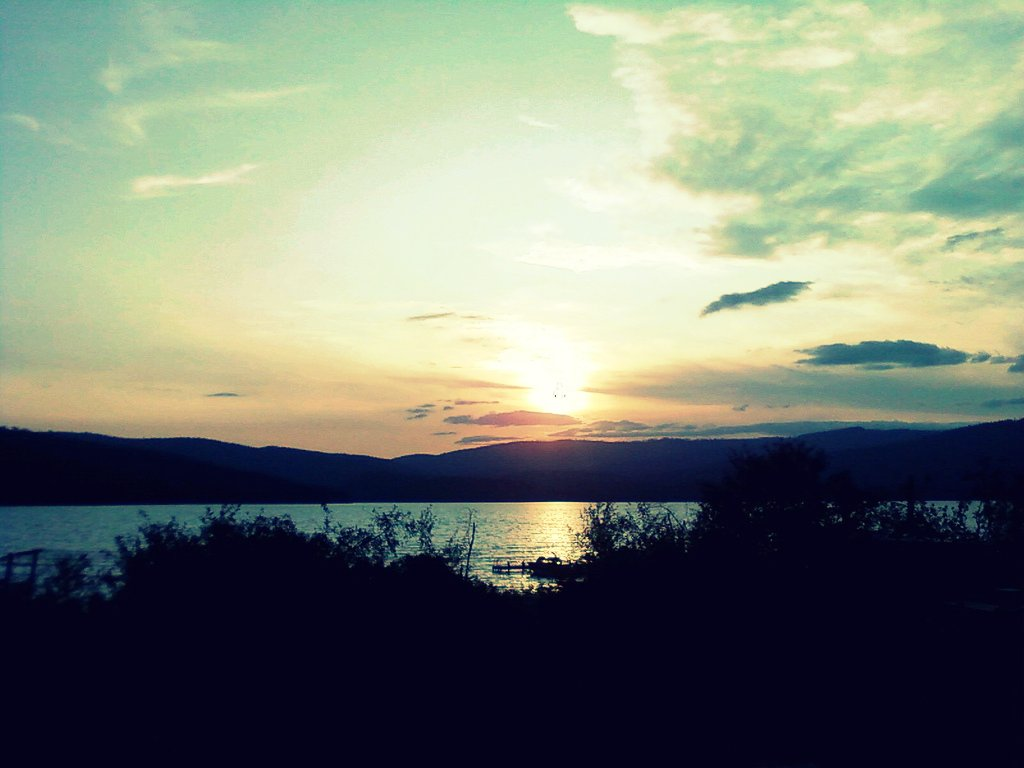
- Lake Mary Ronan

- Location within Montana
- Location: Lake County, Montana, United States
- Nearest town: Dayton, Montana
- Coordinates: 47°55′55″N 114°23′10″W
- Area: 120 acres (49 ha)
- Elevation: 3,727 ft (1,136 m)
- Designation: Montana state park
- Established: 1967
- Visitors: 32,144 (in 2023)
- Administrator: Montana Fish, Wildlife & Parks
- Website: Lake Mary Ronan State Park

Lake Mary Ronan State Park is a public recreation area located seven miles (11 km) northwest of the Flathead Lake community of Dayton, Montana. The state park occupies 120 acres (49 ha) on the east side of 1,500-acre (610 ha) Lake Mary Ronan. The lake is 47 feet deep at its deepest spot and is known for kokanee salmon and yellow perch. Twenty-five campsites and a boat ramp are found in the park.

== Fishing ==
Fishing at Lake Mary Ronan is a popular activity, the lake is stocked for continued enjoyment.

Fish species within the lake
Species	Family	Class	Native to MT
Kokanee	Trout	Coldwater	Introduced
Largemouth Bass	Sunfish	Warmwater	Introduced
Pumpkinseed	Sunfish	Warmwater	Introduced
Rainbow Trout	Trout	Coldwater	Introduced
Westslope Cutthroat Trout	Trout	Coldwater	Native
Yellow Perch	Perch	Warmwater	Introduced
