= Logan State Park =

State park in Montana, USA

- Location within Montana
- Location: Lincoln County, Montana, United States
- Nearest city: Kalispell, Montana
- Coordinates: 48°01′57″N 115°03′58″W
- Area: 17 acres (6.9 ha)
- Elevation: 3,353 ft (1,022 m)
- Designation: Montana state park
- Established: 1967
- Visitors: 26,054 (in 2023)
- Administrator: Montana Fish, Wildlife & Parks
- Website: Logan State Park

Logan State Park is a public recreation area on the north shore of Middle Thompson Lake, off US Route 2 midway between Libby and Kalispell, Montana. The state park encompasses 17 acres (6.9 ha) within 3,000-acre Thompson Chain of Lakes State Park. It offers swimming, boating, fishing, and camping.
