= Greycliff Prairie Dog Town State Park =

State park in Montana, USA

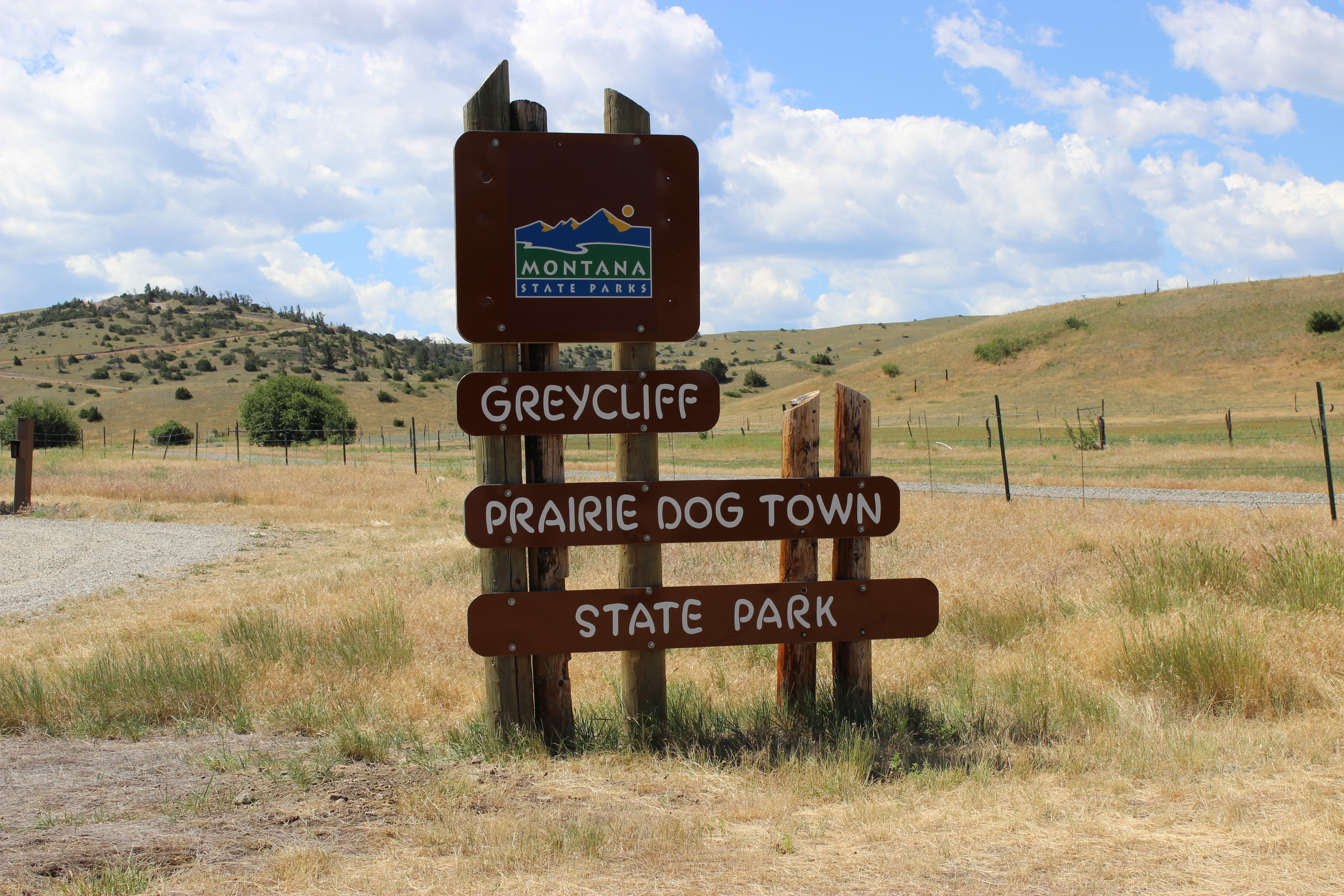

- Location within Montana
- Location: Greycliff, Montana, United States
- Nearest city: Big Timber, Montana
- Coordinates: 45°45′42″N 109°47′23″W
- Area: 98 acres (40 ha)
- Elevation: 3,963 ft (1,208 m)
- Designation: Montana state park
- Established: 1974
- Visitors: 1,167 (in 2023)
- Administrator: Montana Fish, Wildlife & Parks
- Website: Greycliff Prairie Dog Town State Park

Greycliff Prairie Dog Town State Park is a Montana state park located on the eastern edge of the community of Greycliff. The 98-acre (40 ha) park protects and preserves the black-tailed prairie dog.

== Amenities ==
The park includes interpretive displays, and picnic tables, but you must pack out your trash. Pets are allowed.

== Conservation ==
The cite was originally purchased by the Nature Conservancy, then was sold to Montana Department of Fish, Wildlife and Parks with funds obtained through the Montana State Long Range Building Fund and the National Park Service.

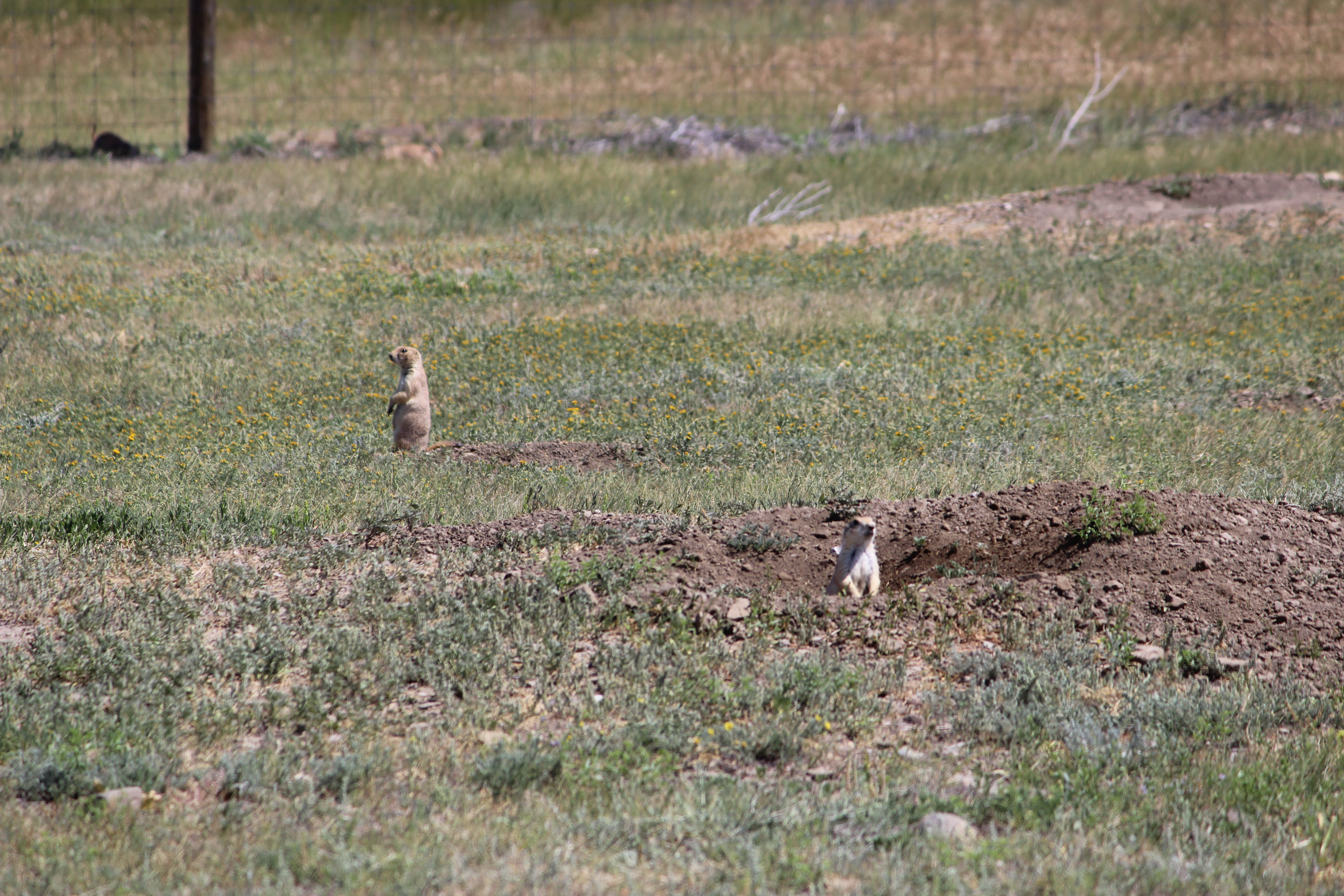
Prairie dogs in the park
