= Clark's Lookout State Park =

State park in Montana, USA

- Location within Montana
- Location: Beaverhead County, Montana, United States
- Nearest city: Dillon, Montana
- Coordinates: 45°14′10″N 112°37′53″W
- Area: 8 acres (3.2 ha)
- Elevation: 4,337 ft (1,322 m)
- Designation: Montana state park
- Established: 1985
- Visitors: 5,179 (in 2023)
- Administrator: Montana Fish, Wildlife & Parks
- Website: Clark's Lookout State Park

Clark's Lookout State Park is a Montana state park located one mile north of the community of Dillon. The 8-acre (3.2 ha) park encompasses the hill overlooking the Beaverhead River that William Clark climbed on August 13, 1805, during the Lewis and Clark Expedition. From the vantage point, Clark took various compass readings and sketched a map of the Beaverhead Valley. The park offers picnicking, interpretive signage, and a chance to make the climb that Clark made and stand where he stood.
