= Fish Creek State Park =

State park in Montana, United States

- Location within Montana
- Location: Mineral County, Montana, United States
- Nearest town: Alberton, Montana
- Coordinates: 46°59′24″N 114°42′57″W
- Area: 5,603 acres (2,267 ha)
- Max. elevation: 5,456 feet (1,663 m)
- Min. elevation: 2,789 feet (850 m)
- Designation: Montana state park
- Established: 2010
- Visitors: 50,565 (in 2023)
- Administrator: Montana Fish, Wildlife & Parks
- Website: Fish Creek State Park

Fish Creek State Park is a public recreation area covering 5,603 acres (2,267 ha) twelve miles west of Alberton, Montana. The state park is the second largest in Montana after Makoshika State Park and is home to Montana's largest ponderosa pine.

== History ==
The state acquired the park site from The Nature Conservancy in 2010. The property had been part of the 310,000 acres The Nature Conservancy and The Trust for Public Land purchased in 2008 from Plum Creek Timber as part of the Montana Legacy Project through which the company divested a large portion of its holdings for purposes of conservation and use by the public.

== Activities and amenities ==
The park offers hiking, picnicking, fishing, and mountain biking.
