= Parker Homestead State Park =

Former Montana state park in Jefferson County

Coordinates: 45°51′00″N 111°40′03″W

Parker Homestead State Park is a former Montana state park located in southeastern Jefferson County, near Three Forks, Montana in the United States. It is eight miles (13 km) west of Three Forks on Montana Highway 2. The park is just 1-acre (4,000 m^{2}) in size and serves to preserve a sod-roofed log cabin that was built in the early 1900s. The cabin is very similar to many of the first homes built by the settlers of frontier Montana. In a cost-saving measure, the Montana state park commission let its lease on the park expire on January 1, 2010, and the homestead reverted to private ownership.
