= Greycliff, Montana =

- CDP
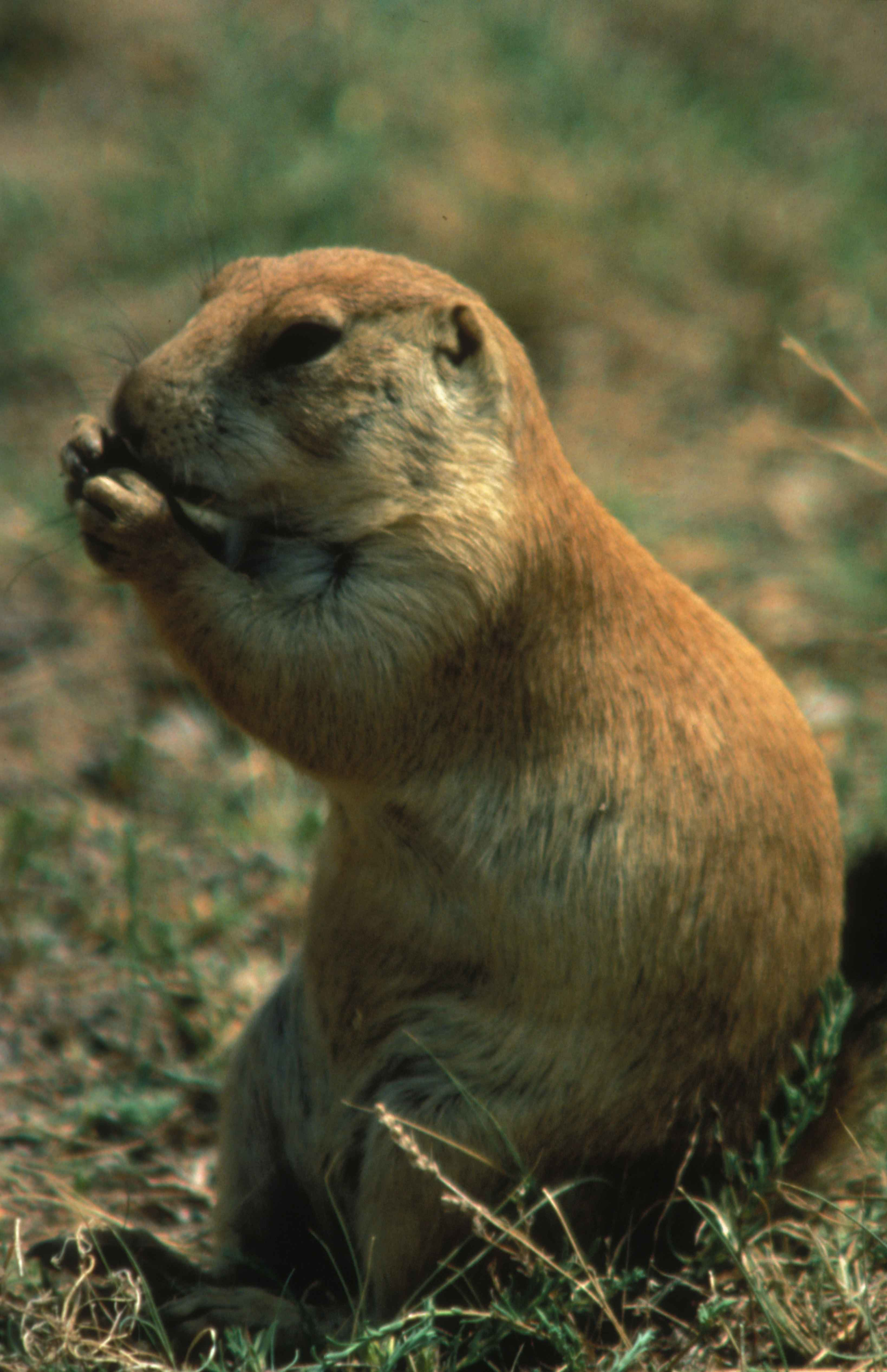
- Black tailed prairie dog eating

- Location of Greycliff, Montana
- Coordinates: 45°45′35″N 109°46′46″W
- Country: United States
- State: Montana
- County: Sweet Grass

Area
  - Total: 0.51 sq mi (1.32 km^{2})
  - Land: 0.51 sq mi (1.32 km^{2})
  - Water: 0 sq mi (0.00 km^{2})
- Elevation: 3,940 ft (1,201 m)

Population (2020)
  - Total: 89
  - Density: 174.7/sq mi (67.47/km^{2})
- Time zone: UTC-7 (Mountain (MST))
  - Summer (DST): UTC-6 (MDT)
- ZIP code: 59033
- Area code: 406
- FIPS code: 30-33250
- GNIS feature ID: 0771991

Greycliff is a census-designated place (CDP) in Sweet Grass County, Montana, United States. As of the 2020 census, Greycliff had a population of 89.

Greycliff Prairie Dog Town State Park is located at the east edge of town. Visitors can view the local black-tailed prairie dog community and their mayor, Al Bino, and learn through interactive displays.

The town was established in 1883 by the Northern Pacific Railroad.

== Population ==
The 2010 census said there was a population of 58. There were 30 males and 28 females. There were 4 youngsters under the age of 18 years. 54 were over 18. There were 6 people aged 20–24. There were 8 people aged 25–34. There were 7 people aged 35–49. There were 20 people aged 50–64. There were 12 people aged 65 and over.

== Geography ==
Greycliff is located at 45°45′35″N 109°46′46″W (45.759715, -109.779376).

According to the United States Census Bureau, the CDP has a total area of 0.3 square miles (0.78 km^{2}), all land.

=== Climate ===
The Köppen Climate System classifies the weather as humid continental, abbreviated as Dfb.

Climate data for Greycliff, Montana
Month	Jan	Feb	Mar	Apr	May	Jun	Jul	Aug	Sep	Oct	Nov	Dec	Year
Mean daily maximum °C (°F)	3 (37)	5 (41)	9 (48)	15 (59)	20 (68)	25 (77)	31 (87)	29 (85)	23 (74)	17 (62)	8 (47)	4 (39)	16 (60)
Mean daily minimum °C (°F)	−9 (16)	−7 (19)	−5 (23)	0 (32)	4 (40)	8 (47)	12 (53)	11 (51)	6 (42)	2 (35)	−3 (26)	−7 (19)	1 (34)
Average precipitation mm (inches)	15 (0.6)	20 (0.8)	33 (1.3)	36 (1.4)	28 (1.1)	33 (1.3)	64 (2.5)	69 (2.7)	41 (1.6)	25 (1)	13 (0.5)	15 (0.6)	390 (15.3)
Source: Weatherbase

== Demographics ==
Historical population
Census	Pop.	Note	%±
2020	89		—
U.S. Decennial Census

As of the census of 2000, there were 56 people, 21 households, and 12 families residing in the CDP. The population density was 168.9 inhabitants per square mile (65.2/km^{2}). There were 28 housing units at an average density of 84.4 per square mile (32.6/km^{2}). The racial makeup of the CDP was 98.21% White and 1.79% Asian. Hispanic or Latino of any race were 1.79% of the population.

There were 21 households, out of which 52.4% had children under the age of 18 living with them, 47.6% were married couples living together, 4.8% had a female householder with no husband present, and 38.1% were non-families. 33.3% of all households were made up of individuals, and 19.0% had someone living alone who was 65 years of age or older. The average household size was 2.67 and the average family size was 3.46.

In the CDP, the population was spread out, with 39.3% under the age of 18, 1.8% from 18 to 24, 33.9% from 25 to 44, 16.1% from 45 to 64, and 8.9% who were 65 years of age or older. The median age was 34 years. For every 100 females, there were 93.1 males. For every 100 females age 18 and over, there were 78.9 males.

The median income for a household in the CDP was $38,750, and the median income for a family was $36,250. Males had a median income of $33,542 versus $11,875 for females. The per capita income for the CDP was $12,023. There were 10.0% of families and 18.8% of the population living below the poverty line, including 16.0% of under eighteens and 33.3% of those over 64.
