= Lost Creek State Park (Montana) =

State park in Montana, United States

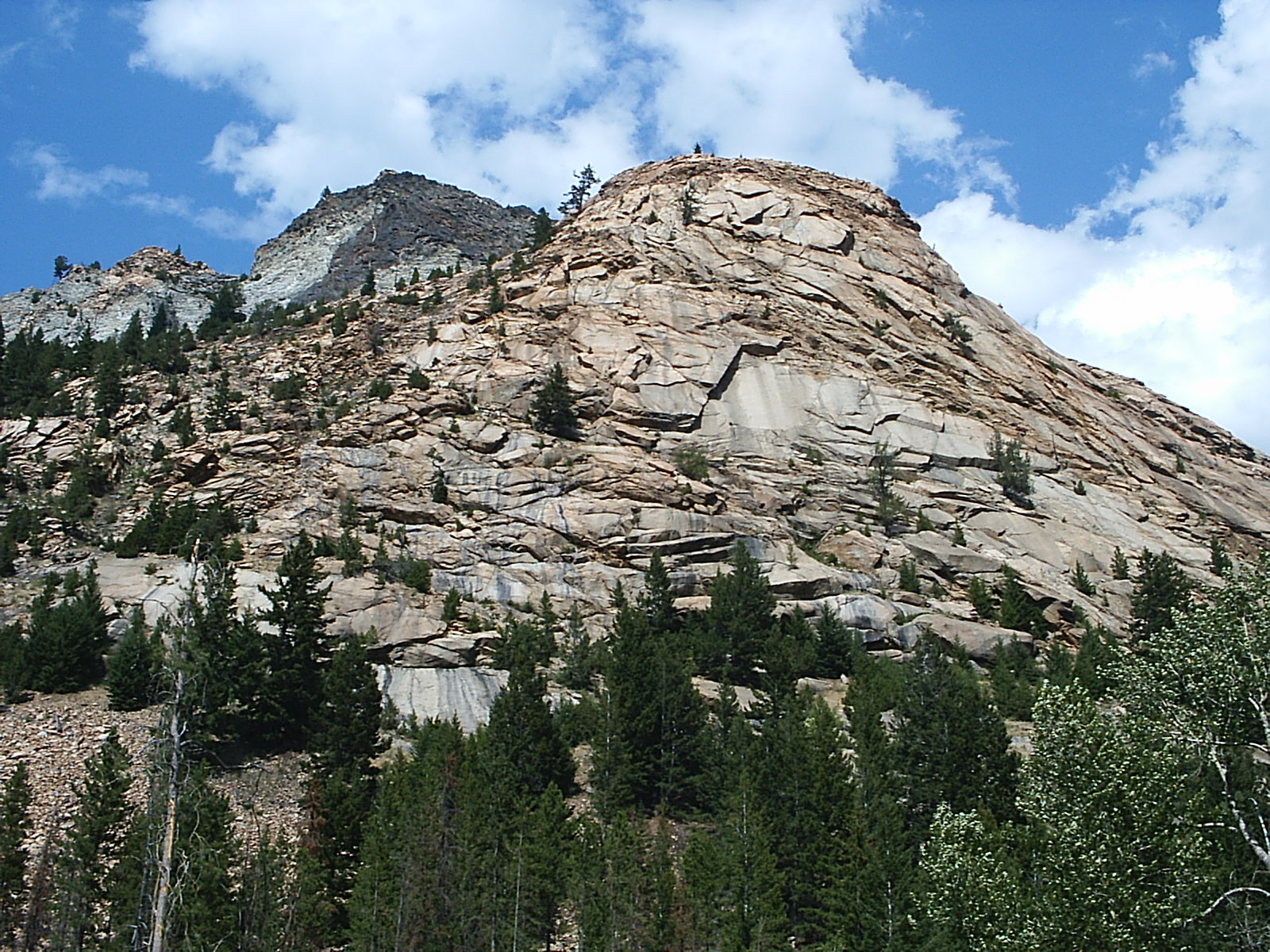
- Limestone cliffs, Summer 2008

- Location within Montana Location within the United States
- Location: Deer Lodge County, Montana; United States
- Nearest town: Anaconda, Montana
- Coordinates: 46°12′39″N 113°00′17″W
- Area: 502 acres (203 ha)
- Elevation: 6,424 ft (1,958 m)
- Designation: Montana state park
- Established: 1957
- Visitors: 12,606 (in 2023)
- Administrator: Montana Fish, Wildlife & Parks
- Website: Official website

Lost Creek State Park is a 502-acre (203 ha) public recreation area in Deer Lodge County, Montana, United States, about 6 miles (9.7 km) north of Anaconda.

== Description ==
The state park was created in 1957 and features limestone cliffs and multi-colored rock formations that rise 1,200 feet (370 m) above a narrow canyon floor. A short walking trail leads to Lost Creek Falls, which plunge 50 feet (15 m). The park offers seasonal camping, fishing, picnicking, bicycling, hiking and wildlife viewing with mountain goats and bighorn sheep commonly seen.

== See also ==
- List of Montana state parks
