= Wild Horse Island =

Island in Montana, United States

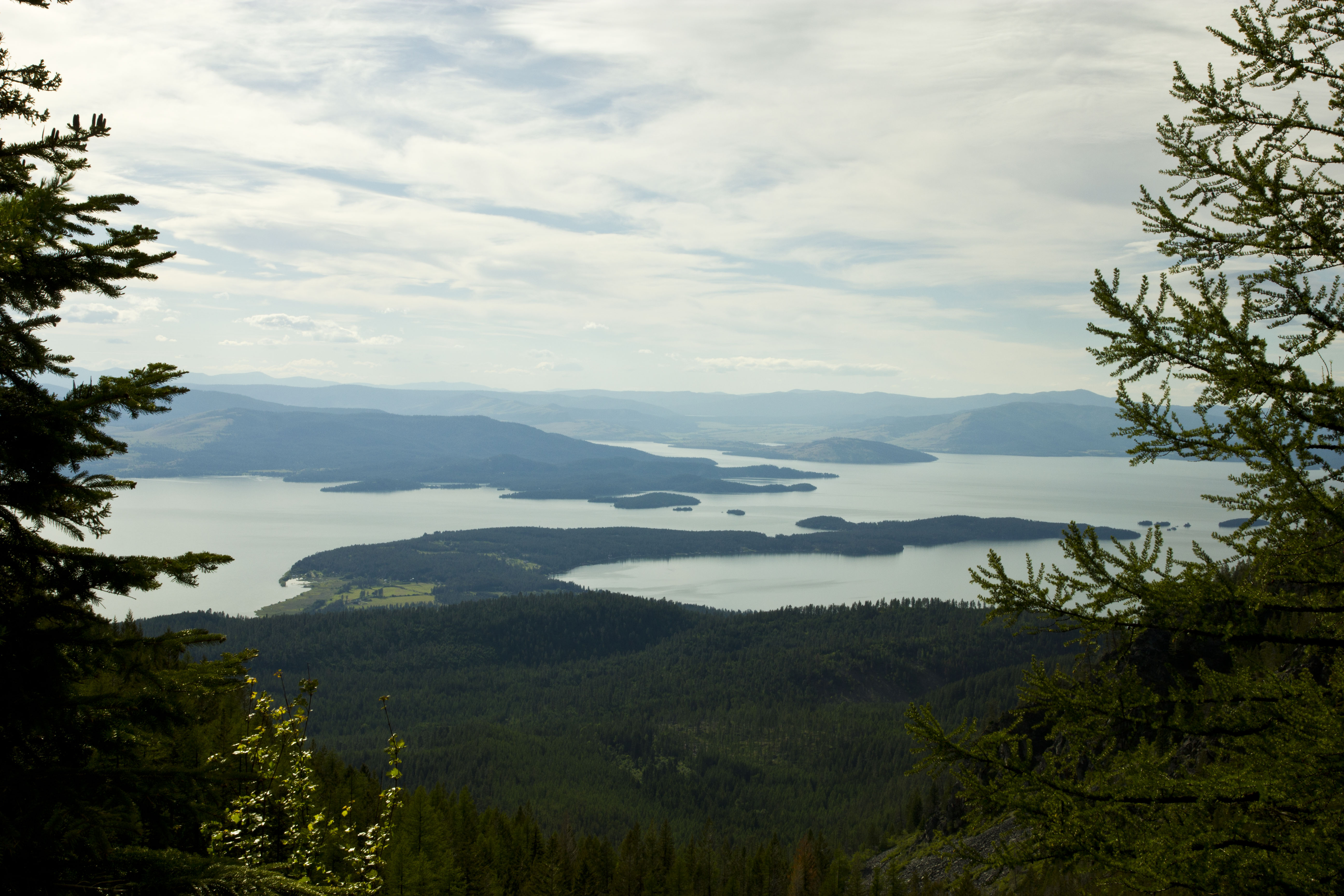
- Flathead Lake with Wild Horse Island visible in the distance

- Location within Montana

Geography
- Location: Flathead Lake
- Coordinates: 47°50′43″N 114°12′54″W
- Adjacent to: Big Arm Bay
- Total islands: 1
- Area: 2,163 acres (875 ha)
- Highest elevation: 3,749 ft (1142.7 m)

Administration
- United States
- State: Montana
- County: Lake
- Indian Reservation: Flathead Indian Reservation

Additional information
- Official website: Wild Horse Island State Park

Wild Horse Island (Montana Salish: Čt'išeʔém, Kutenai: kwiⱡq̓anqmi), approximately 2,164 acres (876 ha) in size, is the largest island on Flathead Lake, the largest freshwater lake in Montana. Protected as a state park since 1977, the island near Big Arm Bay is home to abundant wildlife including bighorn sheep, mule deer, waterfowl, and bald eagles. It is managed by Montana Fish, Wildlife & Parks and lies within both the Flathead Indian Reservation and Lake County, Montana.

== History ==
For centuries, the Salish-Kootenai used the island to pasture horses and keep them from being stolen by other tribes. The island was part of the Flathead Indian Reservation from the reservation's creation in 1872 until 1904, when the island was divided into individual plots of land. A number of attempts were made towards agricultural development, but none succeeded.

Between 1910 and 1915, homesteaders on the island cut down much of the old growth trees and introduced non-native grasses and other plant species. These species have competed with and overtaken much of the shortgrass prairie that herbivorous wildlife need to survive. This short grass prairie is one of the last remaining in Montana, and various animal species are controlled to preserve the grasses from over-pasturing and extinction.

Two Bighorn sheep were introduced in 1939. As of 1987, when two bighorns were brought from Lincoln County, a total of ten sheep have been relocated to the island. In 2014, the population was between 160 and 200 sheep, and Montana Fish, Wildlife, & Parks worked to relocate 59 sheep to other herds in Northwest Montana. Three of the top five bighorn sheep recorded by the Boone and Crockett Club during the three years 2015-2018 came from Wild Horse Island.

As of 2013, the wild horse population was five mares and one gelding.

== Geography ==
The island was formed by the Cordilleran Glacier, giving the island a varying topography. Its shores are 2,900 feet (880 m) above sea level. The glacier caused the six summits in the center of the island, ranging in heights between 3,277 and 3,745 feet (999 and 1,141 m), to be formed into rôche moutonnée, with rugged northern faces and rugged southern cliffs. Meadows sprawl the western and southern shores, while grasslands cover the southeast. The northern side of the island has forests of Ponderosa pine and Douglas fir trees. The highest point is at 3,749 feet (1,143 m), which is 853 feet (260 m) above the island's shores.

=== Climate ===
A study conducted over a 25-year span has shown the average yearly precipitation on Wild Horse Island to be 15.7 inches (400 mm). The average daily temperature ranges from 24 to 66 °F (−4 to 19 °C), with spikes sinking below 5 °F (−15 °C) during colder months and afternoons above 90 °F (32 °C) during the hotter months in dryer years. Overall, the island experiences below freezing temperatures about two thirds of the year.

== Access ==
Access is by boat only and for day-use only. There are 56 private lots on the island, about an acre (0.4 ha) each.

== Gallery ==
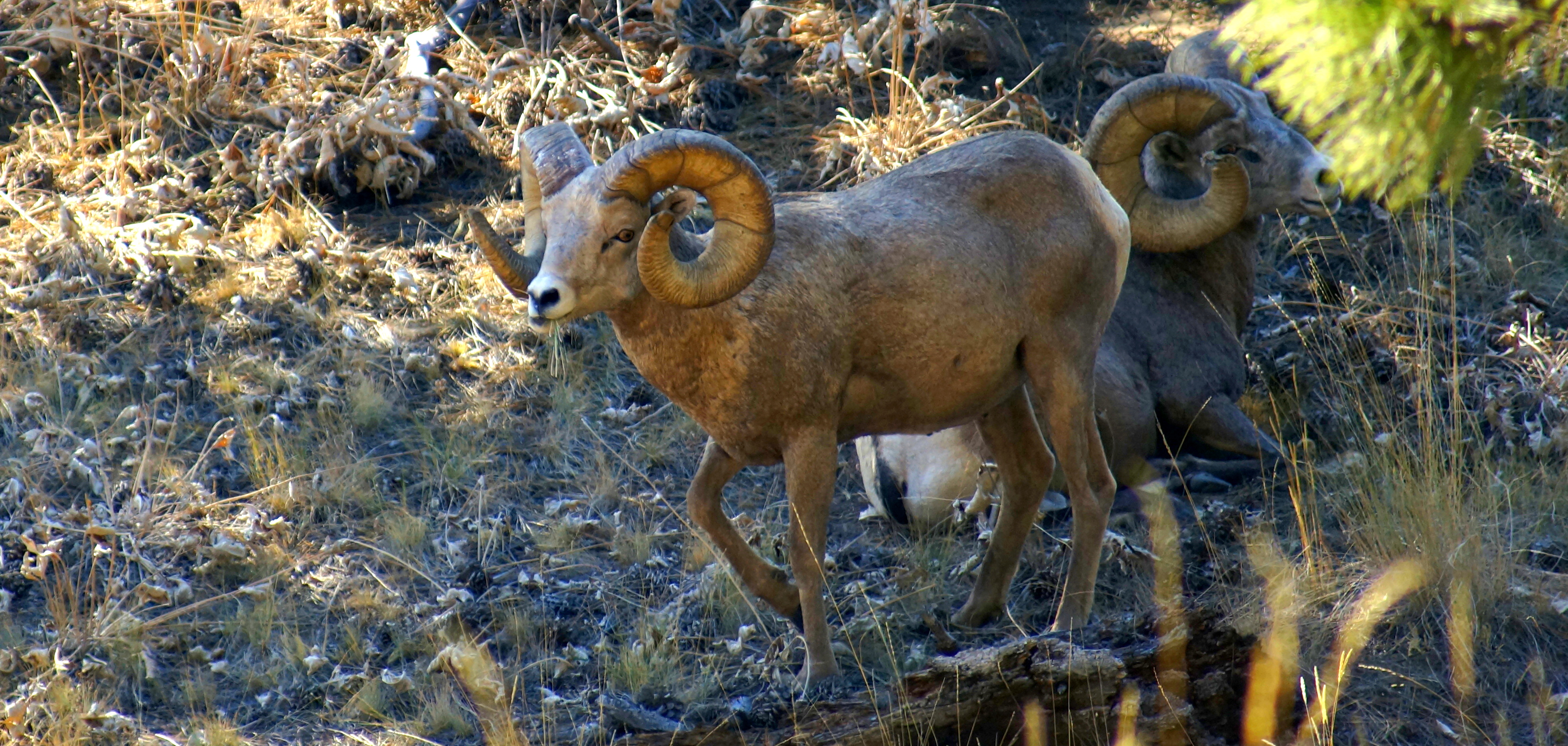
Bighorn sheep grazing on the island.

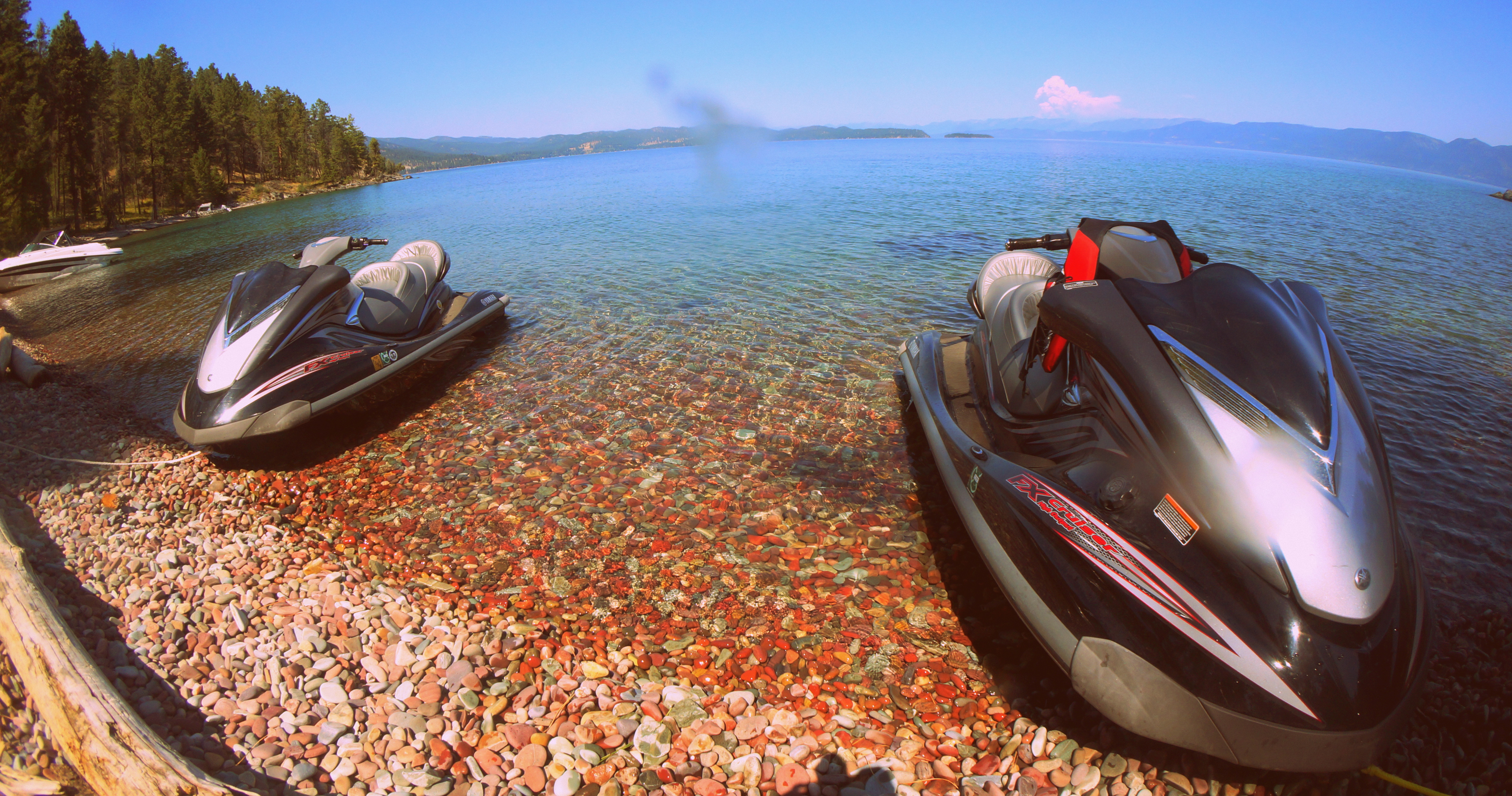
Jet-skis parked on an Eastern shore.

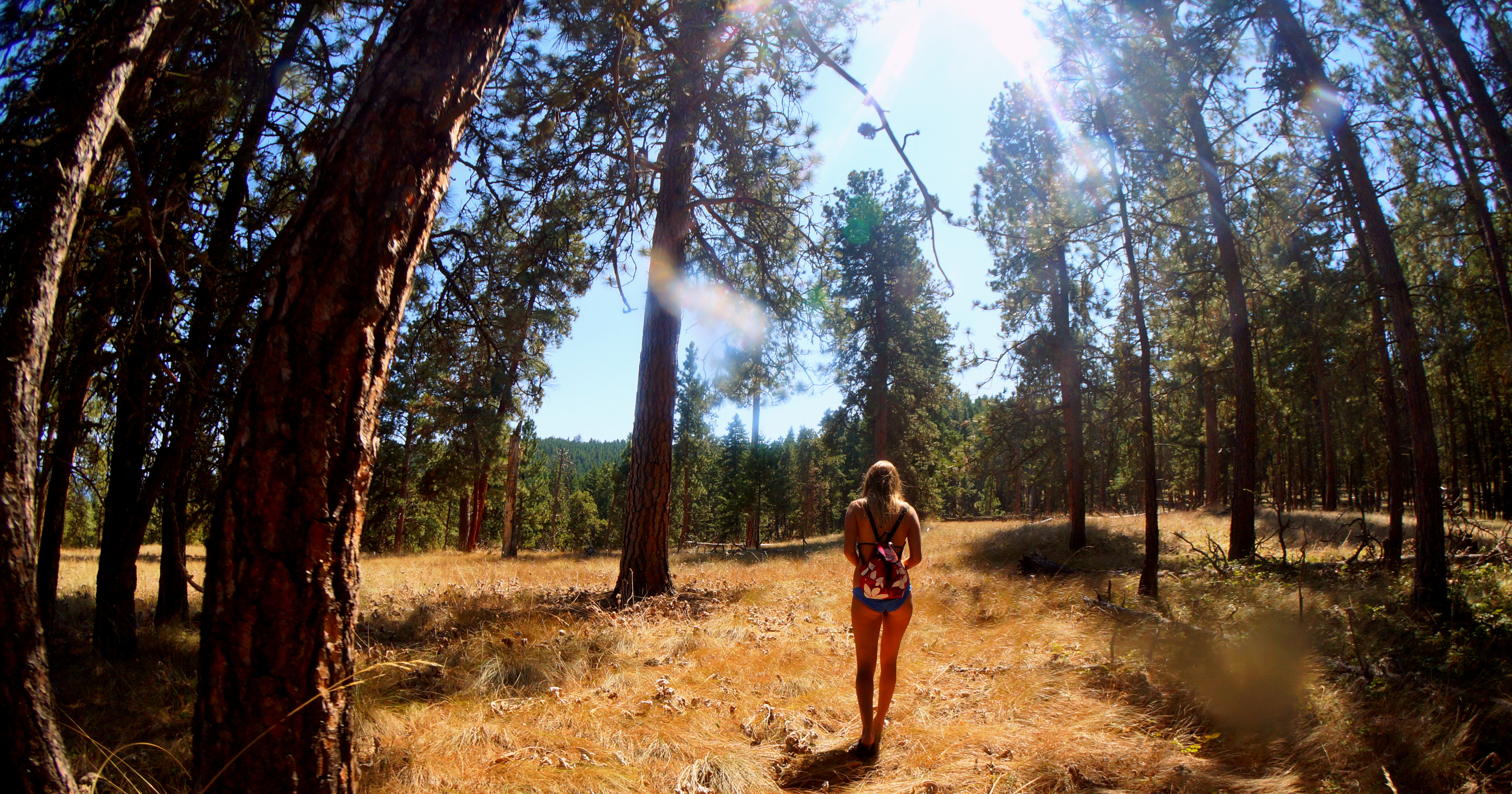
Hiking trail that passes through pine-trees.
