= Muck Creek =

Stream in Washington, U.S.

Coordinates: 47°00′07″N 122°38′21″W

Muck is a stream in the U.S. state of Washington.

The name Muck is derived from an old variant name of Roy, Washington.

== See also ==
- List of rivers of Washington (state)
