= Spring Meadow Lake State Park =

State park in Montana, United States

- Location within Montana
- Location: Lewis and Clark, Montana, United States
- Coordinates: 46°36′44″N 112°04′33″W
- Area: 61 acres (25 ha)
- Elevation: 3,921 ft (1,195 m)
- Established: 1981
- Visitors: 169,348 (in 2023)
- Governing body: Montana Fish, Wildlife & Parks
- Website: Spring Meadow Lake State Park

Spring Meadow Lake State Park is a public recreation area covering 61 acres (25 ha) just west of Helena, Montana. Formerly the site of a gravel pit and factory, the park now centers on a man-made, spring-fed lake used for swimming, fishing, non-motorized boating, and scuba diving. It also offers picnicking, a one-mile trail encircling the lake, and activities such as ice fishing and ice skating in winter. Largemouth bass, westslope cutthroat trout, yellow perch, and pumpkinseed are the main catches. A fishing pier was added to 30-acre (12 ha) lake in 2011.
