= Cooney Dam =

Dam in Montana, United States

Cooney Reservoir
- Location within Montana
- Location: Carbon County, Montana
- Coordinates: 45°26′38″N 109°13′19″W
- Lake type: Reservoir
- Primary inflows: Red Lodge Creek, Willow Creek, Chapman Creek
- Primary outflows: Red Lodge Creek
- Basin countries: United States
- Max. length: 2.3 miles (3.7 km)
- Max. width: 1.1 miles (1.8 km)
- Surface area: 1,078 acres (436 ha)
- Water volume: 28,230 acre-feet (34,820,000 m^{3})
- Surface elevation: 4,222 feet (1,287 m)

Cooney Dam (National Inventory of Dams ID MT00001) is a dam in Carbon County, Montana, that creates Cooney Reservoir.

The earthen dam was constructed in 1937 by the State of Montana, with a height of 97 feet (30 m), and a length of 2,260 feet (690 m) at its crest. It impounds Red Lodge Creek for irrigation water storage. The dam is owned and operated by the Montana Department of Natural Resources and Conservation.

The reservoir it creates, Cooney Reservoir, has a normal water surface of 1.3 square miles (3.4 km^{2}), a maximum storage capacity of 24,195 acre-feet (29,844,000 m^{3}), and a normal capacity of 14,000 acre-feet (17,000,000 m^{3}). Recreation includes boating, camping, hiking, and fishing for walleye and rainbow trout. The state maintains the adjacent Cooney State Park.
