= Montana Department of Fish, Wildlife and Parks =

Government agency of Montana

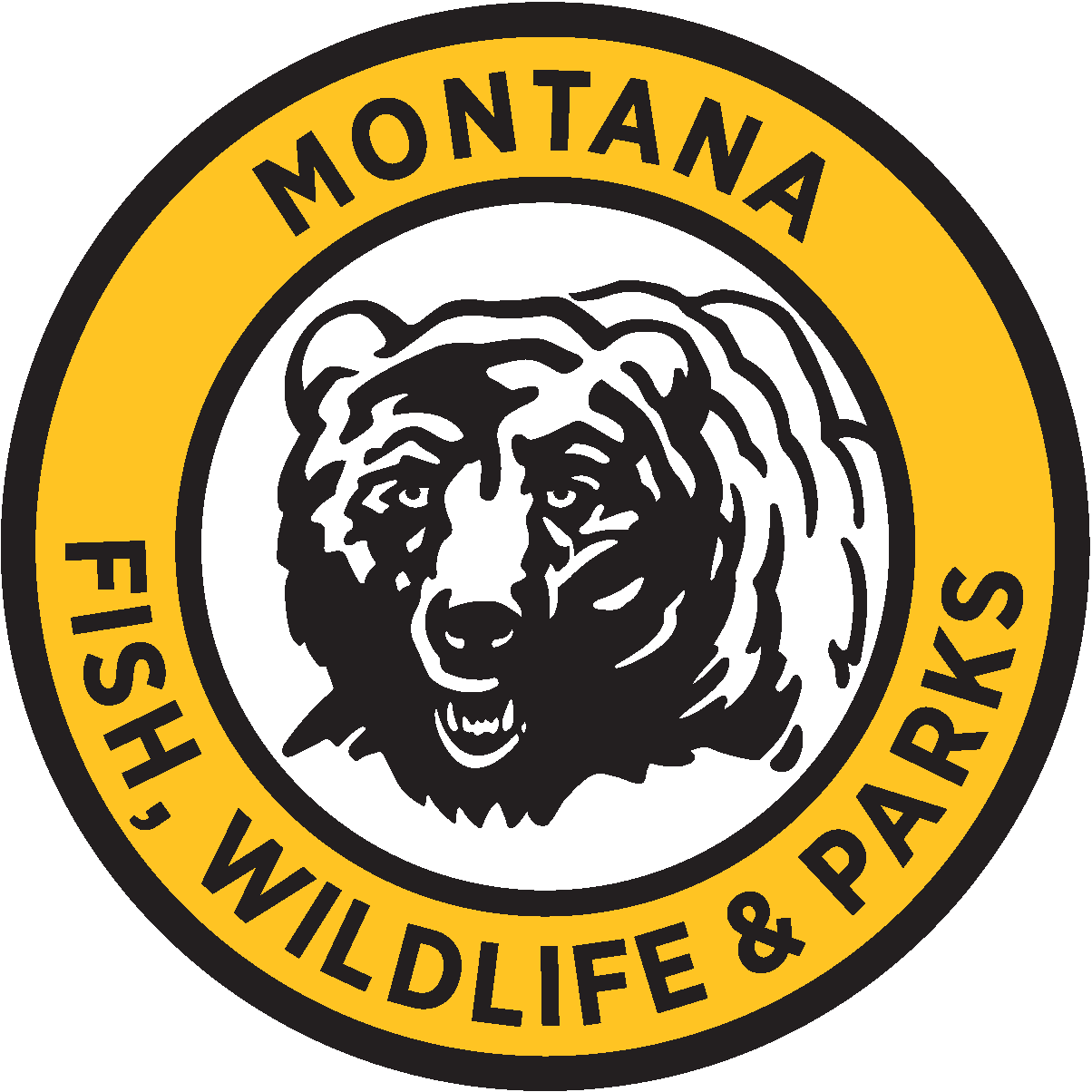
- Abbreviation: FWP

Agency overview
- Formed: 1895
- Preceding agency: Territorial Fish and Game Commission
- Employees: 693 FTEs (May 2009)
- Annual budget: $87.080 million (2009)

Jurisdictional structure
- Operations jurisdiction: Montana, United States
- Area: 147,165 square miles (381,156 km2)
- Population: 967,440 (2008)
- Legal jurisdiction: State of Montana

Operational structure
- Headquarters: 1420 East 6th Avenue, Helena, Montana
- Agency executives: Greg Gianforte, Governor of Montana; Christy Clark, Director
- Regions: Region 1 (Kalispell), Region 2 (Missoula), Region 3 (Bozeman), Region 4 (Great Falls), Region 5 (Billings), Region 6 (Glasgow), and Region 7 (Miles City)

Facilities
- Patrol cars: Various cars, trucks, and off-road vehicles
- Boats: Various patrol and utility craft
- Planes: Light observation aircraft

Website
- http://fwp.mt.gov

The Montana Department of Fish, Wildlife and Parks (MFWP) is a government agency in the executive branch state of Montana in the United States with responsibility for protecting sustainable fish, wildlife, and state-owned park resources in Montana for the purpose of providing recreational activities. The agency engages in law enforcement activities to enforce laws and regulations regarding fish, wildlife, and state parks, and encourages safe recreational use of these resources (such as safety courses for boaters, hunters, snowmobilers, and others).

== History ==
The Montana Territorial Legislature enacted the first fish or wildlife law (it limited fishing methods to rods and lines) in 1854. The first game bird hunting laws were passed in 1869, and hunting seasons for antelope, buffalo, bighorn sheep, deer, elk, moose, mountain goats, and rabbits set in 1872. Fur trapping and bird hunting seasons followed in 1876.

In 1885, the territorial legislature established the Montana territorial Fish and Game Commission. The state's first state game warden was hired in 1889, the same year that Montana became a state. Under Montana state law, each county was also authorized to hire one game warden, but a lack of funds and interest led to no wardens being hired. By 1900, only four of Montana's then-24 counties had game wardens.

The Montana State Legislature established the state Fish and Game Board in 1895. Governor John E. Rickards appointed the first Fish and Game Commissioners on March 4, 1895. The Fish and Game Board hired its first state game warden, R.A. Wagner, in July 1898. Hunting and fishing licenses were imposed on out-of-state residents in 1901. The funds from sale of licenses and fines imposed on violators partially funded the state's court system, and in its first year more than 300 justices of the peace were supported by the law. The Fish and Game commissioners recommended the establishment of a Fish and Game Department, and the legislature created this agency on April 1, 1901. The game warden and his deputies were all authorized law enforcement officers. Fish and game districts were created and eight deputy game wardens authorized for each district. Hunting and fishing licenses for in-state residents were required in 1905.

The state reorganized its fish and wildlife management structure in 1913, creating the first state Fish and Game Commission. In 1921, the state legislature reorganized the Commission: A board of five Commissioners was established, with the power to create fish and game districts, open and close hunting seasons, and more.

The state's first game management area opened in 1926, and by 1936 the state had 46 areas (now called "game preserves") in operation. The first three preservation areas to be set aside were at Snow Creek (along the Missouri River in northern Garfield County), Pryor Mountain (now the Pryor Mountains Wild Horse Range), and the Gallatin River (in Gallatin County). On September 2, 1937, President Franklin D. Roosevelt signed into law the Federal Aid in Wildlife Restoration Act (commonly known as the Pittman-Robertson Act for its two key sponsors, Representative Absalom Willis Robertson [D-Va.] and Senator Key Pittman [D-Nev.]). The law created an excise tax on ammunition, archery equipment, handguns, and hunting firearms, and apportioned the revenue among state wildlife agencies on a matching funds basis (with the provision that each state ban the diversion of hunting and fishing license revenue to other uses). Montana used these funds to purchase its first wildlife management area in 1938 (as of 2005 it had 84). The state used these funds to hire its first wildlife biologist in 1940. Congress passed the Federal Aid in Sport Fish Restoration Act in 1950 (which was almost identical to the 1937 act, funding its activities through excise taxes on fishing gear and equipment), allowing the Montana Fish and Game Commission to hire fisheries biologists, establish its first fisheries management projects, and initiate the first studies of problems affecting fisheries (such as logging and dams).

In 1941, the state legislature gave the Fish and Game Commission the power to engage in rulemaking, and gave it additional power to open and close seasons, set bag limits, and create game preserves. That same year, the Fish and Game Commission established a program to collect data and conduct research on wildlife management so that a more rational wildlife management program might be established.

Montana adopted a new state constitution in 1972. Article IX, Section 1 of the new constitution provided for the protection and improvement of the environment. Subsection 3 of Section 1 declared that the state legislature "shall provide adequate remedies for the protection of the environmental life support system from degradation and provide adequate remedies to prevent unreasonable depletion and degradation of natural resources." On July 1, 1973, the state adopted model legislation known as the Nongame and Endangered Species Conservation Act (Montana Code Ann. 87-5-101-132), which required the state Fish and Game Commission to identify and protect threatened and endangered wildlife, conduct research on non-game and endangered species, and acquire and manage habitat for their use.

The state legislature changed the name of the Montana Fish and Game Commission to the Montana Fish, Wildlife & Parks Commission in 1991.

== Structure ==
=== Commission ===
The Montana Fish, Wildlife and Parks Commission is a quasi-judicial body which is authorized to engage in rulemaking for the Montana Department of Fish, Wildlife and Parks, approves the purchase of land for use by the department, and approves certain activities of the department. There are five members of the commission, all of whom must be citizens of the state and each one of whom represents one of the department's five geographical regions (Northcentral, Northeast, Northwest, Southeast, and Southwest). Members serve for four years. Members are appointed by the Governor, with three members appointed at the beginning of the Governor's term and two appointed two years after the Governor's term begins. Appointments are nonpartisan, but at least one of the Commissioners must have experience in the breeding and management of domesticated livestock.

The commission is independent, but issues reports to and works closely with the Governor and the Director of the Montana Department of Fish, Wildlife and Parks.

=== Department ===
The Montana Department of Fish, Wildlife and Parks is led by a Director, who reports directly to the Governor of the State of Montana. The department has four managerial offices: Human Resources, Lands/Outreach, Legal, and deputy director. The Technology Services Bureau is another managerial office, but reports directly to the deputy director.

The department has three programmatic divisions: Finance, Fish and Wildlife, and Parks. There are five administrative bureaus within the Fish and Wildlife division: Communication and Education, Enforcement, Fisheries, Strategic Planning and Data Services, and Wildlife. In the 1950s, the department established seven administrative regions in the state through which these five bureaus implement their programs. Each administration region is led by a Regional Administrator, who reports to the director. The Parks division has three bureaus: Business Operations, Capital and Recreation, and Field Operations. The Finance division has four bureaus, which includes the Licensing bureau.

Each division head is nominated by the Governor and confirmed by the Montana Senate.

== Budget, personnel, and operations ==
=== Budget and personnel ===
The State of Montana has a biannual budget cycle, with state agencies on a two-year budget cycle. The state's constitution requires a balanced budget.

In 2009, the Montana Department of Fish, Wildlife and Parks had annual revenues of $87,080,733. The state legislature appropriated $1,895,500 (2.2 percent of all revenues), with other state revenues (largely from dedicated taxes and fees) amounting to $10,563,367 (12.1 percent of all revenues). Federal funds account for $17,457,006 in 2009 revenues (20.0 of all revenues), while hunting and fishing licenses accounted for $57,164,860, or 65.7 percent of the Department's 2009 revenues. In 2021, the revenue generated by hunting and fishing licenses (General Licenses) has grown to $71,641,621 and now accounts for 71.3% of total state special revenue and 54.4% of total funding for the Montana Department of Fish, Wildlife and Parks.

The Montana Department of Fish, Wildlife and Parks had total expenditures of $87,080,733 in 2009, of which $13,040,700 were capital expenditures and $74,040,033 were operational expenditures. When expenditures are broken down by divisional costs rather than capital vs. operating budget, the Fish and Wildlife Division spent $57,880,940 (66.5 percent of all expenditures), the Parks Division spent $15,104,493 (17.3 of all expenditures), and the Management and Finance Division spent $14,095,300 (or 16.2 percent of all expenditures) in 2009. The operational budget for the Parks Division was about $8 million in 2008, and came from more than 18 different sources.

The department had 693 full-time equivalent employees in May 2009, of which 197 were seasonal or temporary. These include 74 field game wardens, six uniformed investigators, and three covert investigators in addition to a number of game sergeants and game captains. In April 2010, Governor Brian Schweitzer asked state agencies for a 4 percent across-the-board reduction in personnel. However, the Department of Fish, Wildlife and Parks was exempt from the personnel reductions since most of its revenues came from hunting and fishing licenses.

=== Operations ===
The Montana Department of Fish, Wildlife and Parks launched a new Web page for the state parks system in April 2008 to help promote tourism.

The department acknowledged in March 2009 that it had trouble retaining its game wardens. Pay for an entry-level game warden was $16.72 per hour, one of the lowest in the nation and much lower than a number of private and public security and law enforcement-related positions in the state. Half the state's game wardens had less than five years of experience.

The Fish, Wildlife and Parks department underwent a significant restructuring in the spring of 2009. Joe Maurier, a long-time friend of Governor Schweitzer's, was hired to lead the department's Parks Division in 2006 allegedly after Schweitzer asked that he be hired (an allegation the governor denied). In November 2008, Schweitzer dismissed the long-time head of the MFWP and replaced him with Maurier. Maurier reassigned the department's Deputy Director, Chris Smith, to work on special projects and hired Art Noonan (a state legislator from Butte with no college degree and no hunting or fishing experience) as the new deputy director. Under Governor Schweitzer's instructions, Maurier significantly consolidated the department's divisions. Prior to 2009, the department had separate divisions for communication and education, enforcement, fisheries, and wildlife. It had no strategic planning unit; rather, each division had its own strategic planning staff. The restructuring created the single Fish and Wildlife Division with five administrative bureaus (Communication and Education, Enforcement, Fisheries, Strategic Planning and Data Services, and Wildlife) as well as consolidated Finance and Parks divisions. Instead of reporting to a number of divisions, the regional administrators now reported to the head of the Fish and Wildlife Division. The salary for the administrator of Fish and Wildlife was increased to $82,524 a year. David Risley, administrator of the wildlife management and research division of the Division of Wildlife in the Ohio Department of Natural Resources, was hired to lead the Fish and Wildlife Division. Chas Van Genderen was promoted from Assistant Parks Administrator to Administrator in April 2009.

== See also ==
- List of state and territorial fish and wildlife management agencies in the United States
- List of law enforcement agencies in Montana

== Bibliography ==
- "Agencies Asked for 4 Percent Cut in Personnel." Associated Press. April 14, 2010.
- Babcock, Michael. "FWP Launches Web Page for State Parks." Great Falls Tribune. April 10, 2008.
- Babcock, Michael. "Montana Losing Wardens." Great Falls Tribune. March 12, 2009.
- FWP Annual Report 2009. Montana Department of Fish, Wildlife and Parks. 2009. Accessed 2010-06-18.
- Malone, Michael P. Montana Century: 100 Years in Pictures and Words. Helena, Mont.: Falcon Publishing, 1999.
- McKee, Jennifer. "Agency Revamp Raises Concerns." The Missoulian. August 2, 2009.
- Merchant, Carolyn. The Columbia Guide to American Environmental History. New York: Columbia University Press, 2002.
- Montana's Comprehensive Fish and Wildlife Conservation Strategy. Montana Department of Fish, Wildlife and Parks. 2005. Accessed 2010-06-20.
- Now You Know: A Collection of Facts and Figures About... Montana Department of Fish, Wildlife and Parks. Montana Department of Fish, Wildlife and Parks. December 2007. Accessed 2010-06-15.
- Sanderson, James and Moulton, Michael. Wildlife Issues in a Changing World. 2d ed. New York: CRC Press, 1998.
- Sigler, William F. and Sigler, John W. Recreational Fisheries: Management, Theory, and Application. Reno, Nev.: University of Nevada Press, 1990.
