= Luana Ross =

Native American sociologist from Montana, U.S. (born 1949)

Luana K. Ross
- Born: 1949 (age 76–77)
- Citizenship: Confederated Salish and Kootenai Tribes and American
- Education: Bachelors: University of Montana (1979), Masters: Portland State University, Ph.D.: University of Oregon (1992),
- Employer: University of Washington
- Notable work: Inventing the Savage: The Social Construction of American Criminality
- Awards: Best Book of 1998 by the American Political Science Association, Newberry Library Fellowship (Chicago) in 1994 and 1995, Ford Foundation Postdoctoral Fellowship in 1995

Luana K. Ross (born 1949) is a Native American sociologist of the Confederated Salish and Kootenai Tribes, located at Flathead Indian Reservation in Montana. She received her bachelor's degree from the University of Montana in 1979, her master's degree from Portland State University, and her doctorate in sociology from the University of Oregon in 1992, before serving as faculty at the University of California, Davis and UC Berkeley. Since 1999 she has been a faculty member for the Department of Gender, Women & Sexuality Studies at the University of Washington. She has also been an adjunct professor in American Indian Studies at the University of Washington since 1999. In January 2010, she was appointed president of Salish Kootenai College, effective in July of that year. She resigned from the position in 2012.

== Research ==
Ross is the author of Inventing the Savage: The Social Construction of American Criminality. The book, which deals with the racialized and gendered experiences of incarceration, was awarded the Best Book Award in the field of Race, Ethnicity, and Politics in 1998 from the American Political Science Association. Ross has published numerous articles on the experiences of Native American women, including "Race, Gender, and Social Control: Voices of Imprisoned Native American and White Women" in Wíčazo Ša Review (1994), "Native Women, Mean-Spirited Drugs, and Punishing Policies" in Social Justice (2005), and "From the 'F' Word to Indigenous/Feminisms" in Wíčazo Ša Review (2009). She has also contributed chapters to various texts and anthologies, including Native American Voices: A Reader (1998), States of Confinement: Policing, Detention, and Prisons (2000), and Reading Native American Women (2005).

Her research and teaching interests include Native Women, Visual Sociology, Criminality/Deviance, Race/Ethnic Relations, and Indigenous Methodology. Dr. Ross continues to teach and advise undergraduate and graduate students.

Ross' work has been influenced by the scholar activist, Angela Davis, who mentored Luana for the year that she received the Ford Foundation Post-Doctoral Fellowship and studied at University of California, Santa Cruz.

== Professional service ==
Ross is currently the co-director of the Native Voices Graduate Program of the Department of American Indian Studies at the University of Washington. Native Voices is the master's degree program in Native American Documentary, Film, and New Digital Media, and documentaries produced by students of the program have won numerous awards. Ross herself has produced several award-winning films, including The Place of the Falling Waters (1991), White Shamans and Plastic Medicine Men (1996), and A Century of Genocide in the Americas: The Residential School Experience (2002).

From 2010 to 2012, Ross served as president of Salish Kootenai College in Pablo, Montana. Ross was the third president in the college's history. During her tenure as president, Ross undertook many projects for the benefit of the campus community, including naming a Presidential Commission on Sustainability and a Presidential Commission on Parity, starting an honor professor series, addressing unethical grading in the Nursing Department, enacting new policies on violent and sexual crime on campus, and openly supporting the campus LGBT community. Ross resigned from the position in October 2012, citing "irreconcilable visions" between herself and the members of the governing board. Following her departure from Salish Kootenai College, Dr. Ross returned to teaching and research at the University of Washington.

Ross served as a guest editor of the American Indian Culture and Research Journal, Volume 40, No. 1 (2016). The issue's theme is "Settler Colonialism and the Legislating of Criminality." In addition, Ross serves on the international advisory board for the feminist academic journal Signs.
