= Wind from an Enemy Sky =

1978 novel by D'Arcy McNickle

- Author: D'Arcy McNickle
- Publication date: 1978

Wind from an Enemy Sky is D’Arcy McNickle’s final novel, published posthumously in 1978. The novel follows the tribal members of Little Elk, a fictional Northwestern tribe, as they attempt to navigate encroaching white colonization. The Little Elk people find themselves confronting United States government agents, anthropologists, U.S. marshals, and one very disruptive dam. Wind is McNickle’s eighth book and third novel and is considered a meaningful addition to Native fiction.

According to Louis Owens, the novel was initially not picked up for publishing due to the poor sales of McNickle’s previous novel, The Surrounded, and also due to the fact that the novel was not considered “Indian” enough. McNickle worked on the manuscript for nearly forty years, from its initial conception in the late 1930s to its final publication in 1978.

== Plot ==
Wind from an Enemy Sky begins with the Little Elk tribe's reaction to United States government presence and the construction of a dam on reservation land. While not explicitly mentioned in the text, the Seli’š Ksanka Qlispe’ Dam, located within the Flathead Reservation is believed to provide the model for the fictional dam.

Wind concentrates on the mistrust between the Little Elk people and the United States government and the colonization efforts toward the tribe. In the novel, the Little Elk people argue that the US government destroys their sacred land for worthless gain. At the same time, the US government believes that the land must be "modernized" and refuses to consult the tribe before breaking ground. Such action represents just one of the various ways in which the government imposes on the tribe's traditional way of life.

Solely written in third-person narration, the story features several points of view through the eyes of Natives and Non-Natives. Bull, the patriarch of the Little Elk tribe, attempts to restore their land multiple times, which results in trouble with the government. In the novel, Adam Pell, a prominent American figure, is the builder of the forsaken dam that Bull despises. Pell is convinced that his actions are justified. He attempts to mend the issues created between himself and the tribe, but his actions are ineffective.

A second plot line in the novel centers around Henry Jim and his reconciliation efforts with the Little Elk tribe as he nears death. He had given away the tribe's most sacred object, the Feather Boy medicine bundle, and recognizes that its repatriation represents the only way for him to mend his wrongs.

The meeting of these two plot lines leads to the climax of the novel as the Little Elk attempt to accept these unforgiving truths, ultimately culminating in tragedy.

== Major themes and motifs ==
Regarding Wind from an Enemy Sky, D’Arcy McNickle wrote, “I would like the reader to see the Little Elk episode not as an isolated episode of tragedy, about which one need not get too concerned, but as a critical statement about the quality of human behavior when people of different cultures meet.” Through references to historical and political context, McNickle addresses themes that center on Native-White relations.

=== Assimilation ===
The U.S. government-led project of assimilation is alluded to frequently throughout Wind from an Enemy Sky. One example is government boarding schools, which play a role in generational conflict in the novel. Bull asks his grandson, “Am I talking to you or a piece of paper?” after Antoine tells his grandfather that he read about the dam construction in a newspaper. As Daniel Duane notes, this quote illustrates a clear gulf between Antoine, who was formally educated at a government boarding school and can speak English, and Bull, who is beginning to feel the full effects of linguistic colonialism. Jay Hansford C. Vest also comments on the pervasive effects of boarding schools in the novel, arguing that the dam is a reflection of the decades-old quarrel between Bull and Henry Jim over Henry Jim's supposed indoctrination at boarding school. Henry Jim subsequently chooses to live as a white man, and consequentially the Little Elk's most sacred object, the Feather Boy medicine bundle, is sold to a museum that happens to be owned by the constructor of the dam, who allows the medicine bundle to rot in a storage box in the museum.

=== Cross-cultural relations ===
As Daniel Duane notes, McNickle was sensitive to both the white and Native sides of the cultural conflict. This is evident in the original title of the manuscript, The Indian Agent, which suggests a sympathy for the white government man living on the reservation by making him the title character. The final published title, however, illustrates McNickle's turn to a more pessimistic view of white-Native relations. Despite the stated good intentions on both sides of the conflict, Wind ends in tragedy with the loss of the Feather Boy bundle and death of leaders on both sides. Louis Owens suggests that the novel represents McNickle's attempt to construct a cross-cultural America that ultimately and tragically falls apart.

=== Land and water ===
Following in the tradition of many works of Native literature, land and land ownership are an integral concern of Wind from an Enemy Sky.

As noted in the novel, the Little Elk people have been forced into the foothills of the area due to the allotment of their land. Vest suggests that the loss of the Feather Boy medicine bundle and the feelings of hopelessness that accompany the loss allegorically represent the loss of Native land. According to Vest, Bull's suicidal lashing out in the final moments of the novel suggests a much deeper despair that cannot be accounted for by the loss of the medicine bundle.

Karen Piper touches on the concept of land in Wind by pointing out that Washington, D.C. acts as a figurehead for the US government. The US government materializes through white government agents and their laws, ensuring that the “presence of Washington is perpetually felt by the Little Elk.” Piper outlines the allegorical characteristics of Washington, D.C. and how Bull and Pock Face subvert Washington's mythical power by demonstrating lack of awareness.

Water, and the question of owning it, are also pervasive themes in Wind, as evidenced by Bull's claim that the dam has “killed the water.” In Roger Dunsmore's investigations of water ownership, he finds that for many Salish, Blackfeet, and Cree people, water is more complex than just rivers; it is in animals and humans and the earth. Dunsmore argues that the death of the water involves much more than just the river being dammed.

=== Ancestry and kinship ===
According to Stefano Bosco, in Native literature, ancestry and kinship tend to play large roles in identity formation. In Wind from an Enemy Sky, Henry Jim, Bull, and Two Sleeps serve as ancestor characters, providing cultural lessons and guidance throughout the novel for younger characters like Antoine. Bosco contends that the Feather Boy bundle represents a tie to memory and the past while also embodying the endangerment of Little Elk culture and life.

Bosco also argues that Wind is a novel about repatriation. Bull shares the story of the Feather Boy bundle with Antoine, describing how its return will bring peace to the Little Elk. Bosco asserts that this telling is a way for Bull to build community and perpetuate tribal identity.

== Historical context ==
Although ultimately a work of fiction, Wind from an Enemy Sky can largely be connected to real life places and events in D’Arcy McNickle's life. The home of the Little Elk tribe in the text closely resembles the Flathead Indian Reservation where D’Arcy McNickle grew up. The dam referenced in the text resembles the Seli’š Ksanka Qlispe’ Dam, formerly known as Kerr Dam. The events surrounding the Feather Boy bundle, which is essential to the plot of the novel, bear similarities to a situation involving the Waterbuster Clan Bundle, in which McNickle had been involved: he helped with negotiations for the return of the sacred item in 1938 during his time working for the Bureau of Indian Affairs.

== Reception ==
McNickle's Wind from an Enemy Sky did not receive any awards. The novel was reviewed by Jack W. Schneider for Western American Literature, Volume 16, in 1981. Schneider praised the book, calling it “a fresh perspective of the theme of the subjugation of the Native peoples by the white man.” Schneider's sole criticism was that the white characters are too one-dimensional in comparison with the Native characters in the novel.

Louis Owens, one of the leading scholars of Native American fiction, wrote the afterword for Wind from an Enemy Sky. Owens states that Wind deserves more critical attention than it has yet received. He writes, "For in these powerful works, McNickle has created one of the most penetrating and despairing pictures offered by any American Indian novelist, arguing in these novels that meaningful communication — the communication necessary to survival — is an impossibility between Indian and white world."

Montana's 2014 Teacher of the Year Anna Baldwin created a lesson plan around Wind from an Enemy Sky for the events and connections it has to the Confederated Salish and Kootenai Tribes of the Flathead Indian Reservation.
