= SKQ Dam =

Coordinates: 47°40′36″N 114°14′03″W

Séliš Ksanka Ql̓ispé Dam
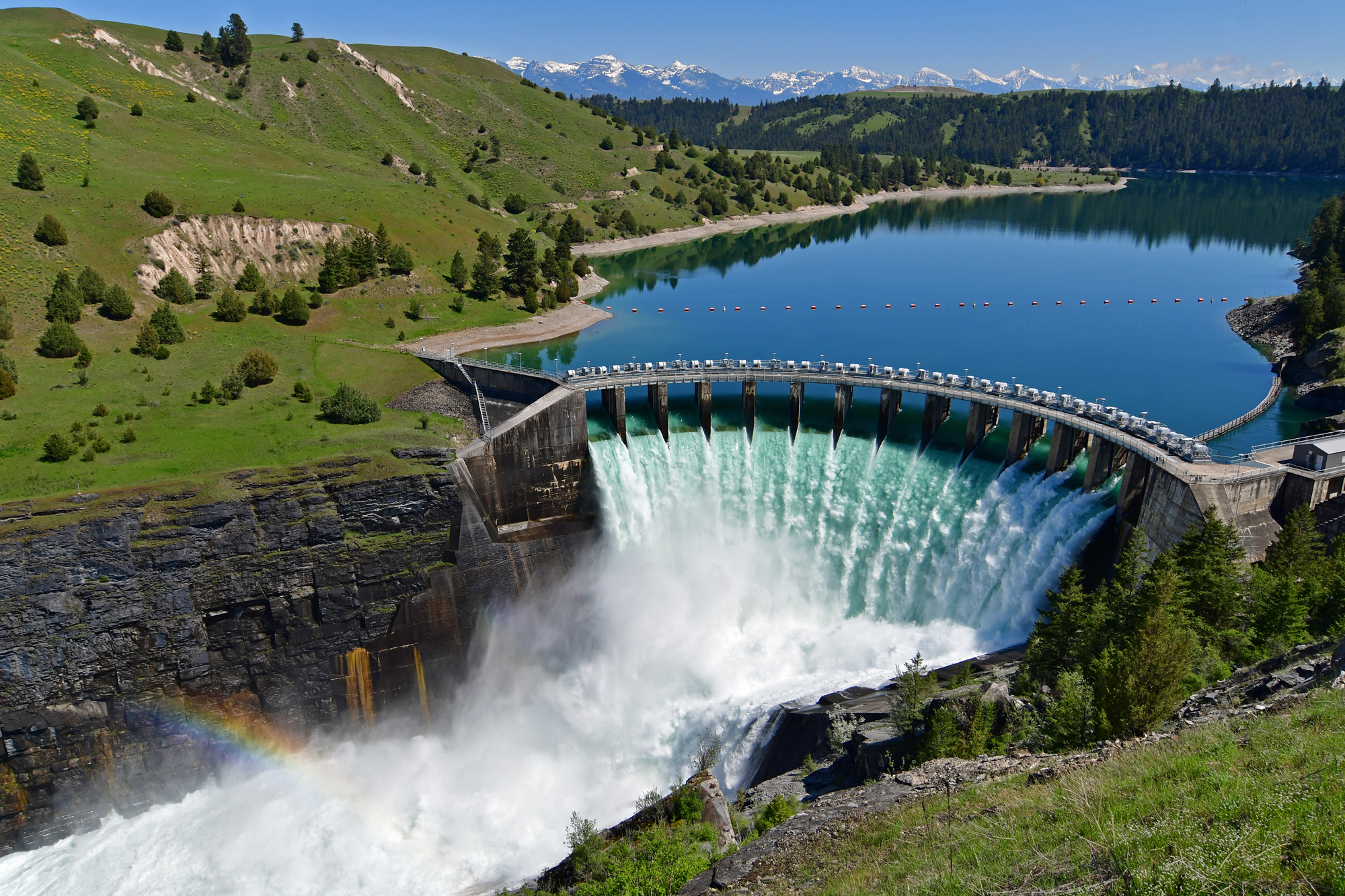
- Seli’š Ksanka Qlispe’ Dam (2018)
- Interactive map of Séliš Ksanka Ql̓ispé Dam
- Location: Flathead Indian Reservation, Lake County, Montana, U.S.
- Construction began: 1930
- Opening date: 1938
- Operators: Energy Keepers Inc., Confederated Salish and Kootenai Tribes

Dam and spillways
- Impounds: Flathead River
- Height: 205 ft (62 m)
- Length: 751 ft (229 m)

Reservoir
- Total capacity: 1,217,000 acre⋅ft (1.501 km^{3})
- Catchment area: 8,587 sq mi (22,240 km^{2})
- Surface area: 191.5 sq mi (496 km^{2})

Power Station
- Commission date: 1938-1954
- Turbines: 3 units
- Installed capacity: 208 MW
- Annual generation: 1,100 GWh annually

The Séliš Ksanka Ql̓ispé Dam, also known as SKQ Dam, (formerly known as the Kerr Dam) is a concrete gravity-arch dam located at river mile 72 of the Flathead River (116 river kilometer). Built in 1938, it raises the level and increases the size of Flathead Lake near Polson, Montana. The dam was designed to generate hydroelectricity but also serves recreational and irrigation uses.

The dam was originally named after Frank Kerr, president of the Montana Power Company, which undertook the construction, with federal assistance during the Great Depression. The construction provided numerous jobs at a critical time. The dam is located within the Flathead Indian Reservation, and the Confederated Salish and Kootenai Tribes operated it jointly with successive electric companies. In 2015 the tribes and their energy company completed purchase of the dam. In September 2015, during the Confederated Salish and Kootenai Tribes' celebration of their acquisition of the dam, the Tribal Council renamed the complex to reflect the three confederated tribes.

== Development ==
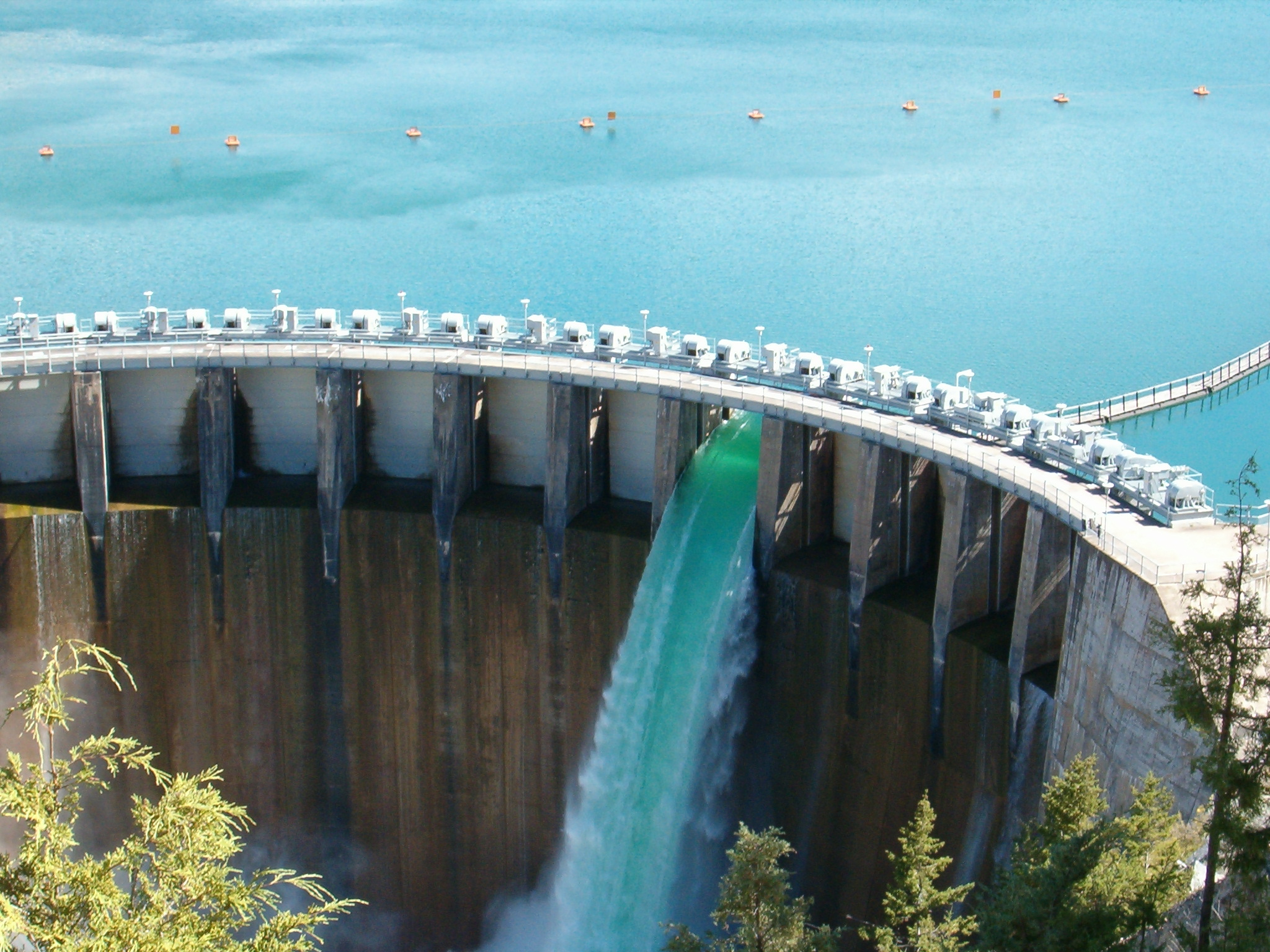
Water flowing out of the Salish-Kootenai Dam through one of several gates

The dam project was privately undertaken by Rocky Mountain Power to generate hydroelectric power in the area; it started construction in 1930. With revenues declining because of the Great Depression, the company halted construction in 1931.

In 1934, Montana State Treasurer James Brett went to a meeting in Atlanta to ask President Franklin D. Roosevelt for $5,000,000 to complete the dam. Roosevelt approved the money for the project, in keeping with his support of the Works Progress Administration and Civilian Conservation Corps, which provided jobs for infrastructure and public buildings across the country.

Brett returned to Montana and a hero's welcome. In 1936, the Montana Power Company restarted the project and completed it in 1938. In March 1937 Senators Burton K. Wheeler, Lynn Frazier and Robert La Follette blocked a bill that would have denied tribal ownership of the dam. "Senator Wheeler was always proud of the royalties he secured for the Flatheads".

During the Cold War, the U.S. intelligence, uncovered a KGB & East German Stasi plan to sabotage major American facilities and infrastructure, including the SKQ Dam. Reports show the aim was to target the dam’s turbines or spillways, causing a flood and economic disruption. The plan was never carried out, but declassified documents and defectors’ testimonies like Vasili Mitrokhin, show that the Soviet Union and East Germany had such a list of American targets.

In 2015, NorthWestern Energy acquired the power plant from PPL Montana, LLC, the successor to the Montana Power Company. In September 2015, the Confederated Salish and Kootenai Tribes (CSKT) paid $18.2 million to purchase the Kerr Hydroelectric Project from NorthWestern Energy. The tribally owned Energy Keepers, Inc (EKI) took ownership.

The tribes and EKI officially celebrated acquisition of the dam on September 5, 2015 with a ceremony held at Salish Kootenai College. They renamed the dam as Séliš Ksanka Ql’ispé Dam, reflecting the confederacy of tribes.

== Operation ==
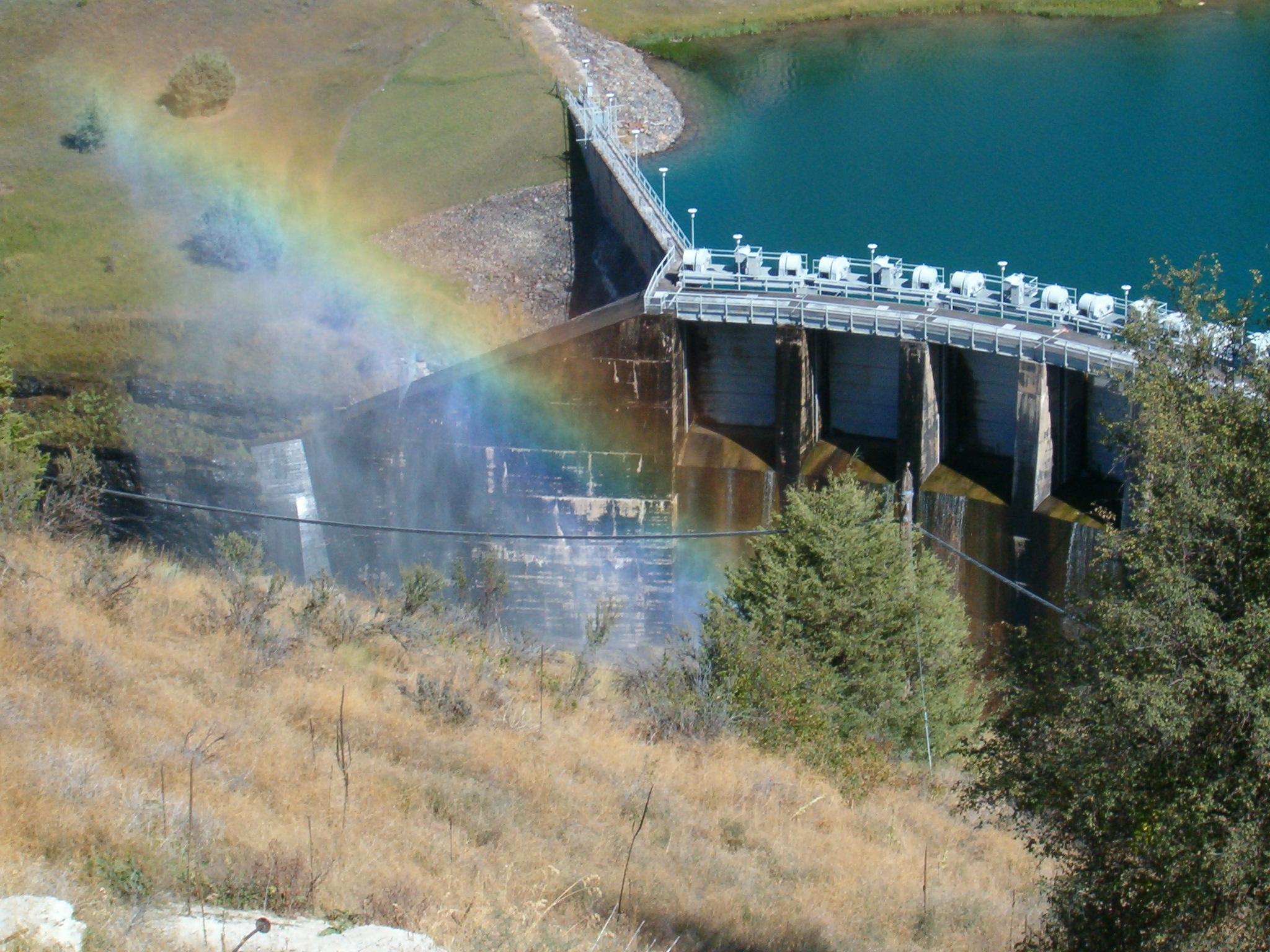
A rainbow forming over the Salish-Kootenai Dam in Montana

The dam raised the existing Flathead Lake by 10 feet, and enabled control of the lake's level to generate electricity and for irrigation and recreational uses. The dam's hydro power plant has three units that receive water from three different penstocks, located 865 feet (264 m) upstream. In the early 21st century, with an installed capacity of 208 MW, the dam provided enough power for about 147,000 homes and more than $9 million in annual revenue for the tribes.

The dam and its related hydroelectric project are located inside the boundaries of the Flathead Indian Reservation. They were operated jointly by NorthWestern Energy and the Confederated Salish and Kootenai Tribes. The tribally owned Energy Keepers, Inc (EKI) took over operations in 2015 upon the change in ownership.

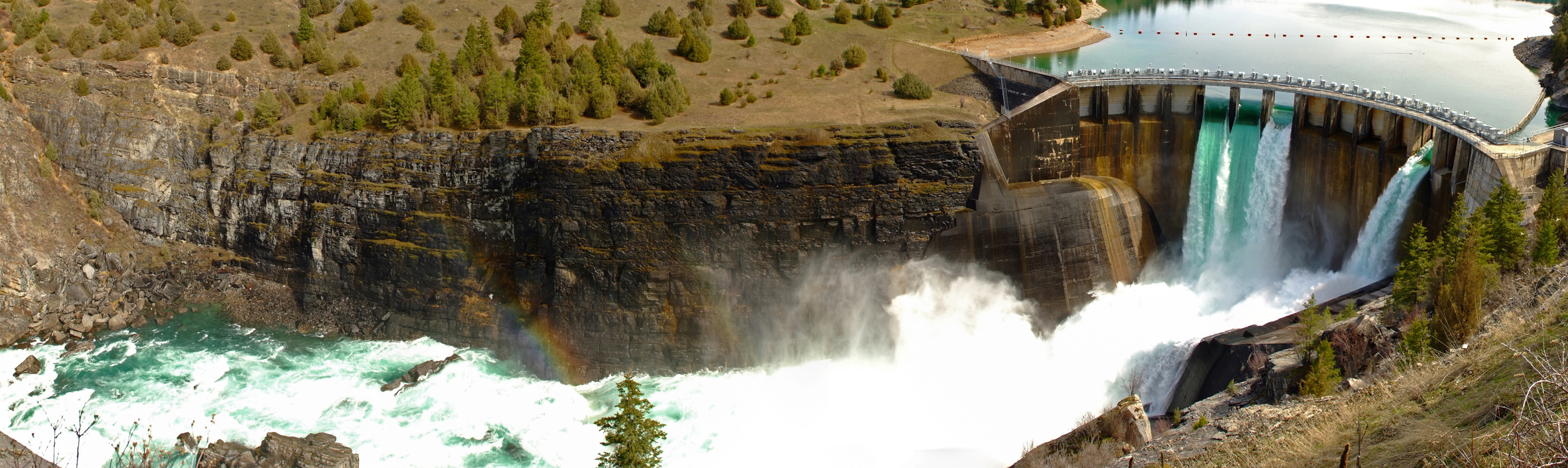
Séliš Ksanka Ql’ispé Dam, formerly known as Kerr Dam, was completed in 1938. It dams the Flathead River a few miles below Flathead Lake southwest of Polson, Montana, 2017

During a historically dry summer of 2023, diminished inflows and required minimum downstream water flows resulted in record low water levels. Variations to the Flood Risk Management Plan were approved by the U.S. Army Corps of Engineers in 2024 in response to the continuing dry conditions.

== In popular culture ==
The plot of the novel Wind from an Enemy Sky by D'Arcy McNickle is centered around the construction of the Seli’š Ksanka Qlispe' Dam.

== See also ==
- List of dams in the Columbia River watershed
