= D'Arcy McNickle Center for American Indian and Indigenous Studies =

"Gi-aum-e Hon-o-me-tah (Young Woman)," painting by Elbridge Ayer Burbank, collection of the D’Arcy McNickle Center for American Indian and Indigenous Studies, Newberry Library.

The D’Arcy McNickle Center for American Indian and Indigenous Studies is a research center within the Newberry Library in Chicago, Illinois.

The center's current director is Rose Miron, who earned her doctoral degree in American studies from the University of Minnesota.

== Mission ==
Its goals are to encourage the use of the Newberry collections on American Indian history; expand the range of what is written about American Indians; educate teachers about American Indian cultures, histories, and literature; assist American Indian tribal historians in their research; and provide a meeting ground where scholars, teachers, tribal historians, and others interested in American Indian studies can discuss their work with each other.

The center’s main focus within the Newberry Library’s collections is the extensive materials acquired by Edward Ayer, including the commissioned portraits by Elbridge Ayer Burbank. The center coordinates annual seminars, workshops and conferences, and provides fellowships for continuing research.

== History ==
Founded in 1972, the center’s inception was guided by an advisory council composed of prominent scholars and intellectual leaders from across the country, with a majority American Indian membership. They chose D’Arcy McNickle (a member of the Confederated Salish and Kootenai Tribes and prominent scholar and literary author) to serve as the first director and help formulate the Center’s mission and goals.

The center was directed by Dr. Patricia Marroquin Norby. Born in Chicago, Illinois she is Chicana and identifies as being of Purépecha/Nde heritage. Norby earned her PhD in American Studies from the University of Minnesota - Twin Cities and her Master of Fine Arts degree from the University of Wisconsin-Madison.

For four decades, the McNickle Center’s staff, fellows, and affiliated research projects have played a major role in shaping modern scholarship in American Indian and Indigenous Studies. Scholars on various fellowships have produced nearly 50 books and dozens of scholarly articles.

== Activities ==
The center’s current activities include academic seminars in American Indian Studies, fellowships for scholars and public programs. The McNickle Center organizes the Newberry Consortium in American Indian Studies (NCAIS) and its related programs, which changed its name from the Committee for Institutional Cooperation/Newberry Library American Indian Studies Consortium in 2009.

Directors, Interim Directors, and Acting Directors

Name	Years served
D’arcy McNickle	1972-1976
Francis Jennings	1976-August 1981
Herbert Hoover	August 1981-August 1983
Frederick Hoxie	August–December 1983, August 1984-August 1995
Helen Tanner (Acting Director)	January-July 1984
R. David Edmunds (Acting Director)
Peter Iverson (Acting Director)
Craig Howe	1997-1998
Harvey Markowitz (Acting Director)	1999
LaVonne Ruoff (Acting Director)	1999-2000
Carolyn Podruchny (Interim Director)	January-August 2001 Robert A. Galler, Jr. (Interim Director)	August 2001-August 2002 Brian Hosmer 2002-2006; 2007-08
Laurie Arnold (interim director)	2006-2007
Gail Terry (Interim Director)	2008-2009
Scott Stevens	January 2009-January 2014
Patricia Norby	February 2014 - 2018
Rose Miron	Present

== D'Arcy McNickle's influence ==
Upon the Center’s inception in 1972, it was titled The Newberry Library Center for the History of the American Indian. Its current namesake and first director, D’Arcy McNickle, had a large role in the development of the Center and its mission. It was his hope that it would become a place where a new life could be given to the old academics of Native American history. This vision included freeing American Indian history from the writings of the Eastern Establishment that was dominant at the time. D’Arcy McNickle worked closely at the Center with Father Peter J. Powell, who was a priest serving the Native American community of Chicago. Father Powell came to the Newberry through a Guggenheim Fellowship as a scholar in residence, and eventually came to serve on the Advisors’ Committee for the Center. Together with the rest of the Advisors’ Committee, Father Powell and McNickle established a vision and a plan for the Center. In a retrospective, Father Powell wrote, “We [the Advisors] wanted tribal oral history to be respected as the truest major source of truth regarding Native American history, rather than the White documents depended upon by writers of American Indian history in the past.” The programs and projects of the McNickle Center continue to cultivate this goal, including the Indians of the Midwest project and the Newberry Consortium in American Indian Studies.

== The Newberry Consortium In American Indian Studies ==
The McNickle Center was home, from 2003 to 2008, to the Committee on Institutional Cooperation (CIC)/Newberry Library American Indian Studies (AIS) Consortium, a faculty- and student-driven initiative supported by Liberal Arts and Sciences Deans from the thirteen CIC institutions of the Midwest. The CIC was dedicated to nurturing quality scholarship in the associated fields of American Indian studies by awarding graduate student and faculty fellowships, hosting graduate student workshops and seminars, sponsoring public programs, and organizing an annual graduate student conference as well as an annual research conference.

In June 2008, the McNickle Center inaugurated the Newberry Consortium in American Indian Studies, (NCAIS). NCAIS began accepting members in the summer of 2008 and launched its first programs in July 2009. The Consortium draws on the Newberry’s world-renowned collection in American Indian and Indigenous Studies and the resources of the McNickle Center to offer annual workshops, institutes, conferences and fellowships to graduate students and faculty at member institutions.

The consortium stands at the heart of the mission of the McNickle Center, and the Center’s staff take responsibility for organizing program administration. The program is composed of six aspects: an annual three-day graduate workshop, an annual graduate conference, a one-month residential summer institute, one to two month graduate student fellowships, faculty fellowships, and additional activities coordinated by the McNickle center. The McNickle Center Seminar in American Indian Studies also runs alongside the Consortium programs, in which staff, fellows, and graduate students and faculty gather to share papers and “works in progress.”

The 20 current Consortium members include: Cornell University, Harvard University, Michigan State University, Northwestern University, Princeton University, University of British Columbia, University of Colorado at Boulder, University of Illinois at Urbana-Champaign, University of Manitoba, University of Minnesota, University of Nevada at Las Vegas, University of New Mexico, University of North Carolina at Chapel Hill, University of Oklahoma, University of Washington, University of Winnipeg, University of Wisconsin at Milwaukee, University of Wyoming, Vanderbilt University, and Yale University

== Additional programs ==
=== The American Indian Studies Seminar Series ===
The American Indian Studies Seminar Series was launched in the Fall of 2008, and features scholarly discussions of presented papers based on works in progress. Attendees include faculty, graduate students, and independent scholars.

=== Public programs ===
The D’Arcy McNickle Center provides public programming highlighting the work of contemporary scholars, authors, and artists who engage American Indian and Indigenous histories, cultures, and perspectives through a variety of mediums. As a member of the Chicago American Indian Collaborative, the Center assists with serving the American Indian and Indigenous peoples of Chicago. The McNickle Center is committed to featuring public events that reflect both the local and hemispheric American Indian and Indigenous experiences.

Various programs are held annually and throughout the year. An annual celebration of Indigenous Dance occurs in Washington Square Park, just across the street from the Newberry. An upcoming collaboration with Northwestern University’s Weinberg College of Arts and Sciences One Book, One Northwestern, Department of English and Department of History will sponsor a series of events for the 2015-2016 academic year.

The D’Arcy McNickle Distinguished Lecture Series is an annual event that celebrates American Indian scholars, writers, and artists who consistently demonstrate excellence in their work concerning Indigenous peoples, cultures, and histories, and who actively address contemporary issues faced by American Indian and Indigenous communities. Previous speakers include Dr. Ned Blackhawk and Leslie Marmon Silko.
