= The Surrounded =

Book by D'Arcy McNickle

- Cover Art, University of New Mexico Press
- Author: D'Arcy McNickle
- Language: English
- Genre: Fiction
- Publisher: University of New Mexico Press
- Publication date: 1936 1964 1978
- Publication place: United States of America
- ISBN: 0-8263-0469-9

The Surrounded, D’Arcy McNickle's first book, was first published in 1936 by Harcourt, Brace and Company then republished in 1964 and again in 1978 by the University of New Mexico Press. McNickle was a Cree Métis author enrolled as Salish-Kootenai on the Flathead Indian Reservation.

The Surrounded takes place in the Sniél-emen Valley, which translates to “Mountains of the surrounded,” on the Flathead Reservation in Montana at the ranch of Max Leon, Archilde's father.

The story begins with Archilde Leon, who is half Salish and half Spaniard, returning from Portland where he worked in white society. Upon his return he feels separated from his homeland and culture. The story follows Archilde's internal struggle between Euro-American and American Indian culture, as he attempts to reconcile with his father and find his place in a community while he deals with the death of his brother and his mother's murder of a game warden. Struggling to reintegrate himself into Salish culture, repair his family bonds, and escape criminal charges, Archilde finds himself trapped in the crossfire as outside forces attempt to decimate his tribe's way of life.

The Surrounded received praise for its ingenuity, and reviewer Louis Owens believes this novel led to an Indigenous literary movement more notable than the Harlem Renaissance. In “You Can't Run Away Nowadays: Redefining Modernity in D'Arcy McNickle's The Surrounded,” Alicia Kent states that The Surrounded resembles a “coming of age” story as Archilde attempts to find his path and place in life, but the story also mixes in modernist style—highlighting themes concerning disillusionment, despair, displacement, and liminal spaces. Reviews by Olive La Farge, J. MacMurrough, and Louis Owens all comment on how McNickle's ability to detect and clearly depict the struggle to coexist in seemingly opposing worlds sets the standard for Indigenous literature.

== Background ==
The Surrounded is the first novel written by Cree Métis author D’Arcy McNickle. The book was originally published in 1936 by Harcourt, Brace & Company, and republished by the University of New Mexico Press in 1978 as a part of the Zia Series. The second publication includes an afterword written by literary collector and scholar Lawrence W. Towner. While little is known about the specifics of McNickle's early life, it is widely accepted that The Surrounded is influenced by the author's own experiences as a person of both Cree and European descent. Like the main character of The Surrounded, McNickle spent much of his childhood on the Flathead Reservation until he was taken to the Chemawa Indian School in Salem, Oregon. After graduating he attended the University of Montana and went on to work for the Bureau of Indian Affairs. It was during this time that McNickle wrote The Surrounded.

The Surrounded takes place on the Flathead Reservation. While little economic data about the reservation is available from the time the novel was written, impacts of the Great Depression appear throughout The Surrounded. The novel explores issues of race and identity in the Salish tribe. McNickle refers to a common practice where white men married Native women in order to claim the land allotted to them under the controversial Dawes Act. This political commentary paired with positive reception for both editions has earned The Surrounded prestige in the canon of Native American Literature.

== Characters ==
=== Archilde Leon ===
Archilde Leon (ahr-SHEEL lay-OHN) is the son of Max Leon, a Spaniard, and Catherine LaLoup Leon, a Salish woman. Having previously worked in Portland as a fiddler, Archilde returns to his home on the Flathead Reservation to visit his mother. Archilde struggles to embrace his Salish roots and make amends with his father, who expected him to take over the family ranch. Archilde finds it hard to leave the reservation once he begins to accept his family and the Salish tribe amidst the murder of his brother Louis and the game warden.

=== Catherine LaLoup Leon ===
Catherine is the daughter of a Salish chief, married to Max Leon, and the mother of Archilde, Louis, and Agnes—she has given birth to eleven children in all. Catherine converted to Christianity with her father and was known as “Faithful Catherine” by the Fathers of their church. Catherine begins to struggle with her faith after the murders of her child Louis and the game warden. Catherine renounces her baptism and then fully embraces her traditional beliefs before dying.

=== Max Leon ===
Max Leon is a Spaniard and moved to the Flathead Reservation once he married Catherine. He is the father of Archilde Leon, but their relationship has fractured since Archilde moved away to Portland rather than working on the ranch. Max isolates himself from Salish people and his family and often visits Father Grepilloux to unburden himself and seek advice. Archilde and Max's relationship begins to heal as his son accepts more responsibility on the ranch. On his death bed, Max wishes he were more understanding and accepting of his family and the Salish people, which allows him to finally receive forgiveness from Catherine and Archilde.

=== Mike ===
Map of Montana Indigenous Reservations

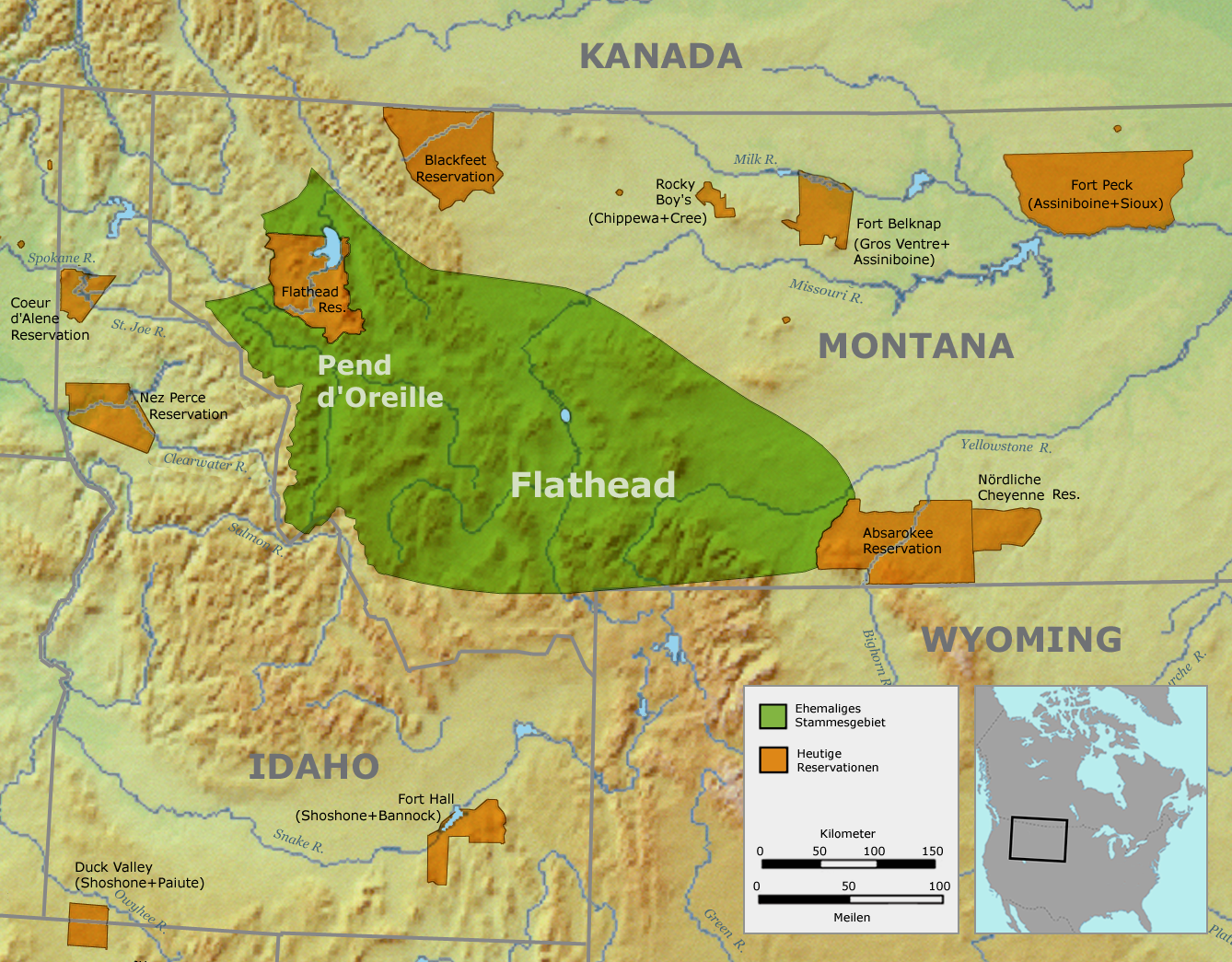
Tribal territory of Flathead compared to present-day reservation.

Mike is Archilde's nephew and Agnes's son. He is a braggadocios boy who enjoys living on the reservation with his family. When Mike is taken to the Mission boarding school, he suffers several traumatic experiences that ultimately change his personality and cause him to endure nightmares, bed-wetting, and irrational fears. Mike ultimately escapes with his brother, Narcisse, in the mountains to avoid getting sent back to the Mission school.

=== Narcisse ===
Narcisse (nahr-sees) is Archilde's nephew and Agnes's son. He and his brother Mike are extremely close. Narcisse becomes concerned when Mike begins to act differently when they return from the Mission school. They eventually escape into the mountains with Archilde and Elise to avoid going back to the Mission school.

=== Elise La Rose ===
Elise is the daughter of Octave La Rose and Modeste's granddaughter. She has a reputation for recklessness in the town, but Archilde and Elise form a close bond and begin to have feelings for one another. Elise helps Archilde, Mike, and Narcisse to escape into the mountains to avoid the authorities, but she winds up having to kill Sheriff Quigley when he discovers their camp. Elise and Archilde are captured by Mr. Parker and a Salish Police officer at the end of the novel.

=== Modeste ===
Modeste is a well-respected elder in the Salish tribe and a chief. Modeste and Catherine have a strong friendship, and he offers his help and knowledge to the rest of his tribe—he helps Mike overcome his trauma, fulfills Catherine's wish to return to their tribal traditions, and tells Archilde their tribal histories and stories to give him a better understanding of his cultural heritage.

=== Dave Quigley ===
Dave Quigley is an infamous Sheriff among the Salish people because of his reputation for incriminating and killing Indigenous people. Sheriff Quigley suspects Archilde after the game warden's disappearance and continues to be a menacing force throughout the book.

=== Mr. Parker ===
Mr. Parker is the Indian Commissioner at the Indian Government Agency. Parker attempts to help Archilde when he is under suspicion for the disappearance of the game warden. He ultimately winds up hunting Archilde down in the mountains and placing him under arrest when he does not return to the agency after his mother's death.

=== Louis Leon ===
Louis Leon is Archilde's brother and tends to be impetuous. Louis steals horses from nearby ranches and takes refuge in the mountains. Louis is killed by a game warden when the warden discovers the family hunting and shoots Louis as he reaches for his rifle.

=== Father Grepilloux ===
Father Grepilloux is a priest at the St. Xavier Mission in the Sniél-emen Valley. He is Max Leon's closest companion and confidant and helps him repair his relationship with his son, Archilde. Father Grepilloux has been writing a book about the missionaries' arrival in the valley and his impressions of the Salish people.

=== Agnes Leon ===
Agnes Leon is Archilde's sister and the mother of Narcisse and Mike. She lives with Max in his house and encourages Archilde to remain on the reservation to help their father with the ranch.

== Plot ==
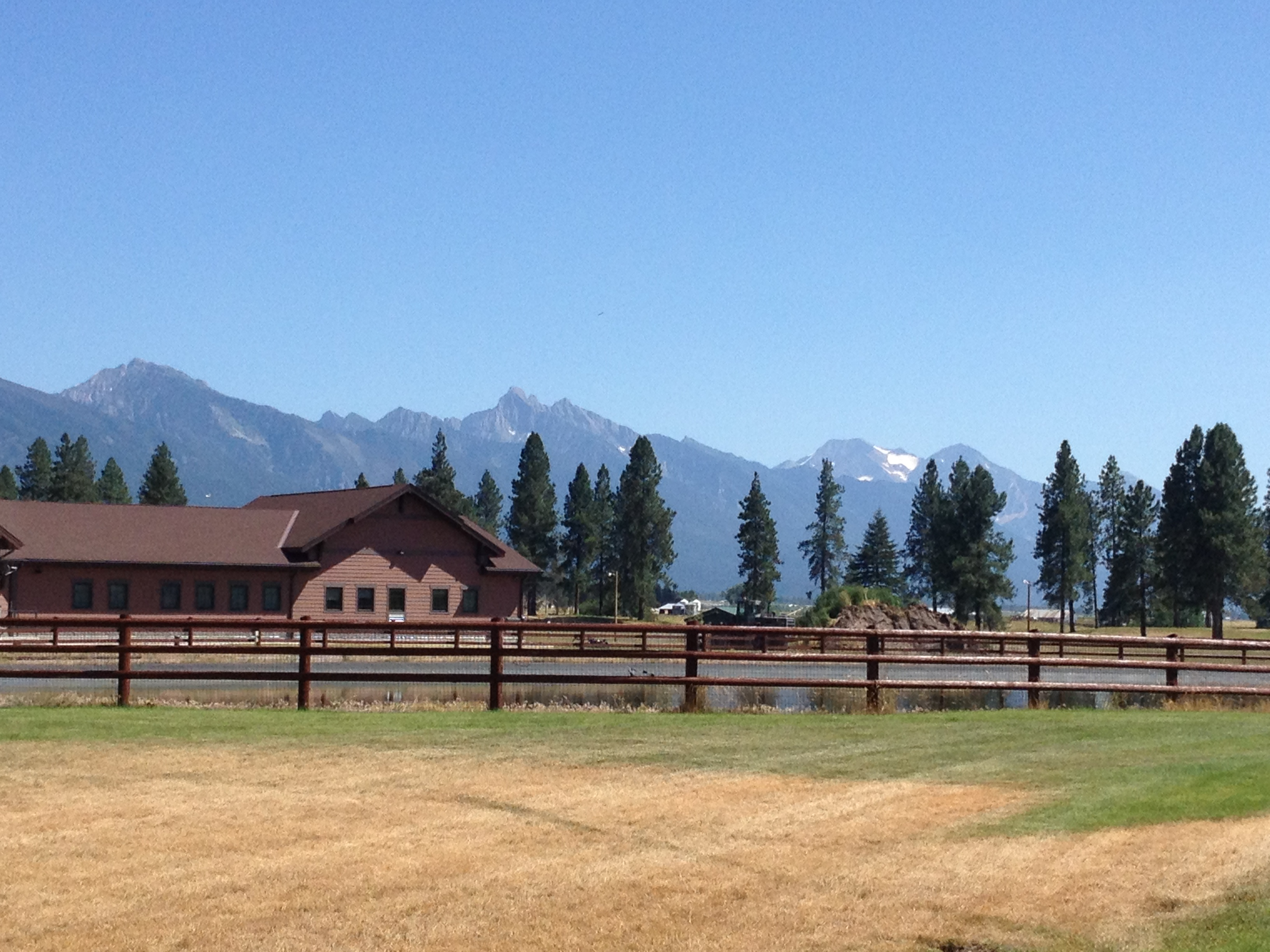
Salish Kootenai College and Mission Mountains

Archilde Leon returns from Portland, where he made a living by playing fiddle in a show house, to his father's ranch in Montana on the Flathead Reservation in the Sniél-emen Valley. Archilde visits with his mother, Catherine—a Salish woman, and she plans to host a feast for Archilde's return to the reservation. Archilde discovers that his brother Louis stole horses and took refuge in the Salish mountains. Archilde dreads seeing his father, Max Leon—a Spaniard, because their relationship has become strained since Archilde left for Portland. Archilde begins to regret his decision to visit his family.

Archilde runs into his brother Louis at the creek on his family's property. He warns him about Pariseau, a rancher, searching for him and tells him that the infamous Sheriff Dave Quigley may eventually get involved in the manhunt.

Max and Father Grepilloux discuss Archilde's return and future on the reservation, and Father Grepilloux suggests that Archilde take violin lessons at the mission to extend his stay on Max's ranch. Later, Archilde attends a feast where the elders share traditional Salish stories that alter Achilde's perspective about his culture, and he begins to embrace his community and family. Max remains in his house during the feast pondering his isolation and lack of connection from the Salish people and his family. Afterwards, Max tricks his grandsons Mike and Narcisse into attending the Mission boarding school under the guise of a joyride in his car.

Catherine and Archilde go hunting in the mountains and find Sheriff Quigley searching for a horse thief—Louis. Catherine and Archilde run into Louis, and they set up camp together to go hunting the following day. After Louis brings back a deer he shot, a game warden approaches their camp and tells them they are in violation of hunting laws. As the warden attempts to put them under arrest, Louis reaches for his gun and the game warden shoots and kills him. Catherine then plunges an ax into the game warden's head and kills him. Catherine and Archilde bury the game warden's body and head back down the mountains with Louis's body. When they arrive at the ranch, Archilde and Catherine lie to everyone by saying that they found Louis dead in the mountains to avoid suspicion or revealing the game warden's murder.

After Louis's death, the Government Indian Agency takes Archilde into custody to investigate his brother's murder and the disappearance of the game warden. Mr. Parker from the Government Indian Agency believes Archilde is being honest with him and promises to help him throughout the investigation. Sheriff Quigley remains skeptical of Archilde's story and believes he is involved with the game warden's disappearance. During this time, Father Grepilloux dies and Max falls ill. When Archilde is released, he rushes to his father's side. In Max's dying moments, he realizes the errors of his ways and wishes he were more open and forgiving with his family, specifically with Catherine.

After the death of Louis and Max Leon, Catherine becomes further removed from the Christian faith, and it no longer provides her with comfort. She holds a tribal meeting where she asks to be whipped—a traditional form of penance— as punishment for her crimes: murdering the game warden and the death her son, Louis. Catherine shares her dream of the white people's heaven and the Salish people's heaven. She describes not being able to enter Salish heaven until she revoked her baptism. Modeste and the tribe agree to use the whip on Catherine for her crimes as she completely denounces her previously devout faith in Christianity.

When Catherine falls ill, Archilde calls for Father Jerome to give the last rites. Father Jerome reveals that he knows the truth about Catherine murdering the game warden and pushes Archilde to report his mother's crimes to the authorities. Archilde reveals his secret to Mr. Parker, and he allows Archilde to remain with his mother until she passes away at which point he must return to the agency to fight any charges that may be brought against him.

After Catherine dies, Archilde and Elise flee into the mountains with Narcisse and Mike to avoid the authorities and sending the boys back to the Mission school. After three days, Mr. Parker sends Sheriff Quigley to find the runaways and bring Archilde to justice. In the middle of the night, Sheriff Quigley discovers their camp in the mountains, but Elise shoots Sheriff Quigley and kills him. Just as Elise and Archilde think they are free, Mr. Parker and a Salish police officer emerge from the brush and place them under arrest. Narcisse and Mike escape from the authorities, but Archilde and Elise are detained.

== Genre and analysis ==
In Alicia Kent's article "You Can't Run Away Nowadays: Redefining Modernity in D'Arcy McNickle's The Surrounded," she describes The Surrounded as coming-of-age novel that illustrates the struggle to maintain Indigenous sovereignty and traditions in a rapidly modernizing world. Kent draws parallels between McNickle's experiences with federally supported assimilatory legislation and the novel's depiction of the Salish people's attempt to preserve their culture and way of life.

According to Carole Goldberg's "A Native Vision of Justice," The Surrounded plays a significant role in American and Indigenous fiction because the novel captures the flaws in federal legislation meant to protect Indigenous communities. Goldberg states that McNickle confronted the shortcomings in federal policy through political action and his literature. Her article suggests that The Surrounded provided McNickle with a platform to highlight the injustice Indigenous people endured at the hands of insufficient federal legislation.

Laird Christensen's “Not Exactly Like Heaven: Theological Imperialism in The Surrounded,” suggests that McNickle's novel illustrates the ideological flaws in attempting to intervene with or "improve" the Salish culture and way of life. Christensen argues that Christianization methods depicted in the novel parallel the threat of erasure for Indigenous people's culture and survival.

In “The Red Road to Nowhere: D'Arcy McNickle's The Surrounded and The Hungry Generations,” Louis Owens concludes that McNickle's dual heritage influenced The Surrounded because Archilde faces a similar dilemma by attempting to bridge his European and Indigenous ancestry. Owens surmises that The Surrounded illustrates that connecting two worlds poses an incredible challenge because opposing cultural values and core beliefs tend to clash rather than coexist.

Robert Dale Parker's article “Who Shot the Sheriff” uses an Indigenous feminist perspective to decipher The Surrounded. He critiques Archilde's character for his inability to make decisions in desperate situations leaving Catherine, his mother, and Elise to fight against the encroaching white community and corrupt government officials. Through Parker's analysis, he suggests that Indigenous men— animated through Archilde's character—must redefine their masculinity and begin to actively resist injustice with indigenous women—represented by Catherine and Elise.

In “D’Arcy McNickle’s Reservation Modernism,” Leif Sorenson's interpretation of The Surrounded illustrates that the novel's major themes highlight the generational trauma indigenous people endured at the hands of colonialism. Sorenson argues that the novel's trajectory evokes themes of cultural erasure as colonial forces decimate tribal resistance to uphold Eurocentric ideology. Ultimately, Sorenson concludes that The Surrounded portrays the reality of colonialism's negative impact on Indigenous peoples' lives and cultural survival.

== Publication and reception ==
D’Arcy McNickle’s – then-named D’Arcy Dahlberg – first attempt at publication of The Surrounded, formerly titled “The Hungry Generations”, was denied by Harcourt, Brace, and Company in 1929. While under his former name, Dahlberg, the publishing company misjudged his name and addressed McNickle as Miss Dahlberg. The novel was accepted and published by Harcourt in 1936. The Surrounded went on to spark the creation of a revamped Native American literature. The Surrounded received strong reviews from the literary critics of its time. Upon release in 1936, American writer Oliver La Farge wrote a review for the novel titled "Half-Breed Hero" in The Saturday Review and rated it as an easy read with a clear, concise structure. La Farge found it especially interesting that the story centered around a character with dual heritage given that McNickle came from a similar background. Moreover, he concluded his review by praising McNickle for explaining the social and mental conflict of having a dual heritage while trying to live by European standards without overwhelming the reader. Similarly, reviewer J. MacMurrough published his assessment in the New Masses titled “From the Inside," and he credited McNickle for delving into the history of the Salish people by including that the Jesuit, Society of Jesus, and the government were meant to help the Salish people but instead these institutions caused more problems. MacMurrough praised McNickle for clearly highlighting a different struggle through each character and noted that he enjoyed the fact that Catherine returns to her Native practices. MacMurrough concluded his review with the notion that The Surrounded is a timeless novel that could never be replicated.
