= D'Arcy McNickle =

Native American novelist

- Born: January 14, 1904; St. Ignatius, Montana
- Died: October 10, 1977 (aged 73); Albuquerque, New Mexico
- Citizenship: Confederated Salish and Kootenai Tribes of the Flathead Reservation, American
- Education: University of Montana (1921–1925); Oxford University (1925–1926); University of Grenoble (1926–1933)
- Occupations: Anthropologist; novelist; political activist
- Writing career
- Language: English
- Notable works: The Surrounded; The Hawk Is Hungry and Other Stories

William D'Arcy McNickle (January 14, 1904 – October 10, 1977) (Salish Kootenai) was a writer, Native American activist, college professor and administrator, and anthropologist. Of Irish and Cree-Métis descent, he later enrolled in the Salish Kootenai nation, as his mother had come to Montana with the Métis as a refugee. He is known also for his novel The Surrounded.

== Biography ==
D'Arcy McNickle was an enrolled Salish Kootenai on the Flathead Indian Reservation. He was born on January 14, 1904, to William McNickle, ethnic Irish, and Philomene Parenteau, Cree-Métis. His mother was among numerous Métis who had fled to Montana in the late 19th century to escape the aftermath of suppression following the 1885 Riel Resistance, also known as the North-West Resistance. She eventually found refuge at the Flathead reservation. McNickle grew up on the reservation in St. Ignatius. He attended mission schools there and boarding schools located elsewhere, off the reservation.

At the age of seventeen, McNickle entered Montana State University (now the University of Montana in Missoula), graduating with the class of 1925. His study of Greek and Latin inspired his love for language, and he began to explore writing. In 1925, McNickle sold his land allotment on the Flathead Reservation to raise money to study abroad at Oxford University, but left Oxford without matriculating. He moved to Paris and briefly attended the University of Grenoble. After returning to the United States, McNickle moved to New York City (NYC) and took on several jobs, including positions at Encyclopædia Britannica and the National Cyclopaedia of American Biography. While in NYC, he wrote several short stories and poems and worked on his novel, The Surrounded, which was subsequently published in 1936.

By 1936, McNickle had moved to Washington, D.C., and started working as an administrative assistant at the Bureau of Indian Affairs (BIA). McNickle worked under John Collier, Commissioner of Indian Affairs, during the 1930s and 1940s. During this period, Collier encouraged the reorganization of self-government among the Native American tribes, and many began to assert greater autonomy for their peoples. McNickle developed expertise in a wide range of areas related to Native American policies. He helped found the National Congress of American Indians in 1944. By 1950, he had been promoted to chief of the tribal relations branch at the BIA. McNickle also began to publish non-fiction works on Native American history, cultures, and governmental policies.

In 1952, McNickle was selected as director of American Indian Development, Inc., which was affiliated with the University of Colorado at Boulder. He was also active with other Native American organizations, as tribes began asserting their civil rights and working more closely together as an ethnic group. He was instrumental in drafting the "Declaration of Indian Purpose" for the 1961 American Indian Chicago Conference.

McNickle was appointed as an associate professor in 1966 to what is now the University of Regina. In 1972, McNickle helped create the Center for the History of the American Indian in Chicago's Newberry Library.

=== Personal life ===
McNickle was married three times: First to Joran Jacobine Birkeland from 1926 to 1938; they had a daughter. He next married Roma Kaye Haufman (1939–1967). They also had a daughter. Lastly, he was married to sociologist Viola Gertrude Pfrommer, from 1969 to 1977. McNickle died of a heart attack in October 1977.

== Legacy and honors ==
- 1963, he received John Simon Guggenheim Memorial Fellowship for Anthropology and Cultural Studies
- 1966, he received an honorary Doctor of Science degree from University of Colorado.
- 1984, the Center for History of the American Indian at the Newberry Library was named for him.
- 1987, Salish Kootenai College Library was renamed the D'Arcy McNickle Library in his honor. Salish Kootenai College is a tribal college on the Flathead Reservation.
- He was named a fellow of the American Anthropological Association.

== Writing ==
In addition to his works in Native American history and culture, McNickle wrote short stories and novels. His best-known work may be his debut novel, The Surrounded (1936). It tells of Archilde León, a young half-Salish man who returns to the Flathead Indian Reservation and his parents' ranch. He has difficulty dealing with both his ethnic Spanish/white father and his traditionalist Indian mother, who has increasingly returned to her culture. The relationship between him and his parents becomes strained when they express their regret that he wants to go away to a big city far from home.

León begins to find his place on the reservation after Modeste, an elder, teaches him the stories of Salish history. He reconciles with his father and adopts his mother's Interior Salish traditions. At the end of the novel, he is wrongly accused of two murders (one committed by his mother) and surrenders to law enforcement in a scene referred to by the book's title.

== The Hawk is Hungry and Other Stories (1992) ==
This collection of sixteen stories demonstrates the range of McNickle's literary style, organized into three loose categories:

The Reservation

- "Hard Riding"
- "En roulant ma boule roulant..."
- "Meat for God"
- "Snowfall"
- "Train Time"

Montana

- "The Hawk Is Hungry"
- "Debt of Gratitude"
- "The Wedding Night"
- "Newcomers"
- "Man's Work"
- "Going to School"

The City

- "Manhattan Wedlock"
- "Let the War Be Fought"
- "In the Alien Corn"
- "Six Beautiful in Paris"
- and "The Silver Locket".

== Organizations ==
- National Congress of American Indians (N.C.A.I)
- American Indian Development, Inc.

== Books ==
=== Fiction ===
- The Surrounded (1936)
- Runner in the Sun: A Story of Indian Maize (1954), young adult novel
- Wind From an Enemy Sky (1978)
- The Hawk Is Hungry and Other Stories (1992)

=== Non-fiction ===
- They Came Here First: the Epic of the American Indian (1949, revised edition 1975)
- The Indian in American Society (for National Congress of American Indians, 1955)
- Indians and Other Americans: Two Ways of Life Meet (1959)
- Indian Man: A Life of Oliver La Farge (1971)
- Native American Tribalism: Indian Survivals and Renewals (1973)
- An Historical Review of Federal-Indian Relationships (American Indian Policy Review Commission, 1975)

== American Indian Chicago Conference ==
June 1961

- Declaration of Indian Purpose

== Academic criticism ==
- Cobb, Daniel M. "Chapter One: Declarations." In Before Red Power: The Politics of Tribal Self-Determination in Cold War America. Lawrence: University Press of Kansas, 2008.
- Cobb, Daniel M. "Indian Politics in Cold War America: Parallel and Contradiction," Princeton University Library Chronicle LXVII, no. 2 (winter 2006): 392–419.
- Cobb, Daniel M. "Talking the Language of the Larger World: Politics in Cold War (Native) America." In Beyond Red Power: New Perspectives on American Indian Politics and Activism. Edited by Daniel M. Cobb and Loretta Fowler. Santa Fe: School of American Research Press, 2007.
- Collier, John. "A Perspective on the United States Indian Situation of 1952 in its Hemispheric and Worldwide Bearing." América Indígena 13, no. 1 (January 1953): 7–13.
- Cowger, Thomas. The National Congress of American Indians: The Founding Years. Lincoln: University of Nebraska Press, 2001.
- Cracroft, Richard H. Twentieth-century American Western Writers. Detroit: Gale Group, 1999.
- Critical Perspectives on Native American Fiction. Edited by Richard F. Fleck. Washington, D.C.: Three Continents Press, 1993.
- Kevin De Ornellas, "'Hawk is Hungry' and Other Stories", in Jennifer McClinton-Temple and Alan Velie, eds, Encyclopedia of American Indian Literature (New York: Facts on File, 2007), pp. 159–60. ISBN 978-0816056569.
- Handbook of Native American Literature. Edited by Andrew Wiget. New York: Garland, 1996.
- Hans, Birgit, ed. "The Hawk is Hungry" & Other Stories: An Annotated Anthology of D'Arcy McNickle's Short Fiction. Tucson: University of Arizona Press, 1992.
- Hans, Birgit. "Surrounded: The Fiction of D'Arcy McNickle." Thesis Dissertation (Ph.D.) University of Arizona, 1988.
- Hans, Birgit. The Hawk is Hungry: An Annotated Anthology of D'Arcy McNickle's Short Fiction. Thesis (M.A.) University of Arizona, 1986.
- Lagrand, James B. Indian Metropolis: Native Americans in Chicago, 1945-75. Chicago: University of Illinois Press, 2002.
- Libby, Orin Grant. The Arikara Narrative of Custer's Campaign and the Battle of the Little Bighorn. Introduction by D'Arcy McNickle. 1920. Norman: University of Oklahoma Press, 1998.
- Lurie, Nancy Oestreich. "Sol Tax and Tribal Sovereignty," Human Organization: Journal of the Society for Applied Anthropology, Vol. 58 No. 1 (Spring 1999): 108–117.
- Miller, Jay. Writings in Indian History, 1985-1990. Compiled by Jay Miller, Colin G. Calloway, and Richard A. Sattler. Norman: University of Oklahoma Press, 1995.
- Nagel, Joane. American Indian Ethnic Renewal: Red Power and the Resurgence of Identity and Culture. New York: Oxford University Press, 1997.
- Native American Literature: An Anthology. Compiled by Lawana Trout. Lincolnwood, Ill.: NTC Pub. Group, 1999.
- Ortiz, Alfonso. D'Arcy McNickle (1904–1977): Across the River and Up the Hill: A Personal Remembrance. 1980-1989?.
- Ortiz, Simon J. "Towards a National Indian Literature: Cultural Authenticity in Nationalism." MELUS 8, no. 2 (summer 1981): 7–12.
- Owens, Louis. Other Destinies: Understanding the American Indian Novel. Norman: University of Oklahoma Press, 1992.
- Parker, Dorothy R. Choosing an Indian Identity: A Biography of D'Arcy McNickle. Thesis Dissertation (Ph.D.) University of New Mexico, 1988.
- Parker, Dorothy R. "D'Arcy McNickle: Living a Broker's Life." In Between Indian and White Worlds: The Cultural Broker. Edited by Margaret Connell Szasz. Norman: University of Oklahoma Press, 1994.
- Parker, Dorothy R. Singing an Indian Song: A Biography of D'Arcy McNickle. Lincoln: University of Nebraska Press, 1992.
- Parker, Dorothy. "D'Arcy McNickle." In The New Warriors: Native American Leaders since 1900. Lincoln: University of Nebraska Press, 2001.
- Parker, Robert Dale. The Invention of Native American Literature. Ithaca: Cornell University Press, 2003.
- Provinse, John Henry, Thomas Segundo, Sol Tax, and D'Arcy McNickle. The American Indian Now: An NBC Radio Discussion. Chicago: University of Chicago Round Table (Radio Program), 1954.
- Purdy, John Lloyd. Word Ways: The Novels of D'Arcy McNickle. Tucson: University of Arizona Press, 1990.
- Rains, James W. "Today Speaks in Yesterday's Voice: Writing American Indians into History in the Fiction of D'Arcy McNickle." Thesis Dissertation (Ph.D.) University of Michigan, 2004.
- Roemer, Kenneth M. Native American Writers of the United States. Detroit: Gale Research, 1997.
- Rosier, Paul C. "'They Are Ancestral Homelands': Race, Place, and Politics in Cold War Native America, 1945-1961." Journal of American History 92, no. 4 (March 2006): 1300–1326.
- Ruppert, James. D'Arcy McNickle. Boise, Idaho: Boise State University, 1988.
- Smoke Rising: The Native American Literary Companion. Edited by Joseph Bruchac, managing editor; Janet Witalec, editor with Sharon Malinowski. Detroit: Visible Ink Press, 1995.
- Squires, Nancy Elam. "Back to the Blanket: The Indian Fiction of Oliver La Farge, Joseph Matthews, D'Arcy McNickle, Ruth Underhill and Frank Waters, 1927-1944." Thesis (Ph.D.) Harvard University, 2004.
- Stories for a Winter's Night: Short Fiction by Native Americans. Edited by Maurice Kenny. Buffalo, N.Y.: White Pine Press, 2000.
- Straus, Terry, Ron Bowan, and Michael Chapman, "Anthropology, Ethics, and the American Indian Chicago Conference," American Ethnologist Vol. 13 No. 4 (November 1986): 802–804.
- The Legacy of D'Arcy McNickle: Writer, Historian, Activist. Edited by John Lloyd Purdy. Norman: University of Oklahoma Press, 1996.
- The Singing Spirit: Early Short Stories by North American Indians. Edited by Bernd C. Peyer. Tucson: University of Arizona Press, 1989.
- Thompson, Joan Elizabeth. "The Control of Water and Land: Dams and Irrigation in Novels by Mary Hallock Foote, Mary Hunter Austin, Frank Waters, and D'Arcy McNickle." Thesis Dissertation (Ph.D.) University of Minnesota, 1994.
- Towner, Lawrence William. "D'Arcy McNickle." In Past Imperfect: Essays on History, Libraries, and the Humanities. Edited by Robert W. Karrow Jr. and Alfred F. Young, with an introduction by Alfred F. Young. Chicago: University of Chicago Press, 1993.
- Voice of the Turtle: American Indian Literature, 1900-1970. Edited by Paula Gunn Allen. New York: Ballantine Books, 1994.
