= Patricia Marroquin Norby =

Curator at the Metropolitan Museum of Art

- Born: Patricia Marroquin; 1970 (age 55–56); Chicago, Illinois, U.S.
- Education: Clarke University (BFA); University of Wisconsin-Madison (MFA); University of Minnesota, Twin Cities (PhD)
- Occupation: Curator
- Known for: First associate curator of Native American art at the Metropolitan Museum of Art
- Spouse: Nathan Norby

Patricia Marroquin Norby (born 1970) is an American curator of Native American art. On September 14, 2020, she became the first full-time curator of Native American art at the Metropolitan Museum of Art. She left her role there in 2025.

== Background ==
Patricia Marroquin, born in 1970 in Chicago, Illinois. She has claimed to be of Purépecha and Apache descent which she says she suppressed throughout her childhood and did not embrace until her college years. She says she learned about Mexican Purépecha healing traditions from her great-grandmother Maria Jesus Torres, who used leaves, herbs, and animal fat. Her great-grandparents moved from Mexico to Chicago in the 1930s. Her claims of Native American ancestry had been contested since her appointment, including by the tribes she identified with. The Tribal Alliance Against Frauds published a report in which they claimed that Norby had "zero American Indian ancestry"."

She is married to Nathan Norby, a veterinarian. Norby moved to Washington, D.C. in 2002.

== Education and early career ==
Norby graduated from Clarke University in Dubuque, Iowa, with a Bachelor's degree in fine arts. She earned her Master's of Fine Art from the University of Wisconsin–Madison in printmaking, photography, and video in 2002 and then had two internships at Washington, D.C. museums. She created an exhibition of Native American works of art including works from the George Gustav Heye Center collections of the Smithsonian Institution and Bureau of Indian Affairs artifacts stored at the Library of Congress.

In 2006, her work was exhibited in Art and Bus in Eau Claire, Wisconsin. The same year she used black ink and leaves to create "Family Medicine" and other artwork which was published in a Chicana and Chicano art magazine. By 2006, she opened a business called Native Roots that sold organic foods made with values of indigenous people as well as jewelry made by Native Americans.

Norby has a doctoral degree from the University of Minnesota, Twin Cities, in American studies with a specialization in Native American art history and visual culture. Her scholarship explored ways in which "European Americans have historically manipulated American Indian images to create a non-American Indian perspective." Her 2013 dissertation, "Visual Violence in the Land of Enchantment," addressed how modern nuclear power and industrial agriculture are reflected in fine art. Norby filmed interviews with Native Americans about their urban life experiences in a film called "Powwow".

== Career ==
Norby was the director of the D'Arcy McNickle Center for American Indian and Indigenous Studies at the Newberry Library in Chicago. In 2016, she presented "Indians in the Archives: American Indian Art at the Newberry".

She was an assistant professor of American Indian studies at the University of Wisconsin–Eau Claire. Norby served a short stint as senior executive and assistant director of the National Museum of the American Indian in New York.

Norby explored the value of including Native American artists and communities in cultural institutions in the United States in "Museums Pivot: Shifting Paradigms for Collaboration" at the Indian Arts Research Centers' program, where she was keynote speaker, in 2021. In an interview she noted that cultural institutions in the United States are reviewing past practices regarding management and exhibition of Native American art, developing approaches that involve indigenous people and highlight Native American and Indigenous artworks.

By 2016, she was a member of the board of trustees for the Field Museum of Natural History. She was one of several board members of the Southwestern Association for Indian Arts along with board chair L. Stephanie Poston (Sandia Pueblo), and board members Walter Lamar (Blackfeet Tribe), Russell Sanchez (San Ildefonso Pueblo), and JoAnn Chase (Mandan, Hidatsa and Arikara).

In 2020, Norby became the first full-time curator of Native American art at the Metropolitan Museum of Art.

In 2025, Norby left her role at the Metropolitan Museum, citing health concerns.

== Publications ==
- Norby, Patricia Marroquin. 2013. Visual Violence in the Land of Enchantment. Dissertation Abstracts International. 74–11. Thesis (Ph.D.)--University of Minnesota, 2013.
- Norby, Patricia Marroquin. 2015. "The Red Sweater: Family, Intimacy, and Visual Self-Representations". American Indian Culture and Research Journal. 39 (4): 33–44.
- Scudeler, June, and Patricia Marroquin Norby. 2015. "Art, Aesthetics, and Indigenous Ways of Knowing". American Indian Culture and Research Journal. 39 (4): ix-xi.
- Norby, Patricia Marroquin. Forthcoming. Water, Bones, and Bombs: Three Artists and the Fight for Northern New Mexico. University of Nebraska Press.
