= Pablo, Montana =

- Census-designated place
- Location of Pablo, Montana
- Coordinates: 47°36′06″N 114°07′12″W
- Country: United States
- State: Montana
- County: Lake

Area
  - Total: 4.85 sq mi (12.56 km^{2})
  - Land: 4.85 sq mi (12.56 km^{2})
  - Water: 0 sq mi (0.00 km^{2})
- Elevation: 3,087 ft (941 m)

Population (2020)
  - Total: 2,138
  - Density: 441.0/sq mi (170.28/km^{2})
- Time zone: UTC-7 (Mountain (MST))
  - Summer (DST): UTC-6 (MDT)
- ZIP code: 59855
- Area code: 406
- FIPS code: 30-56350
- GNIS feature ID: 2409011

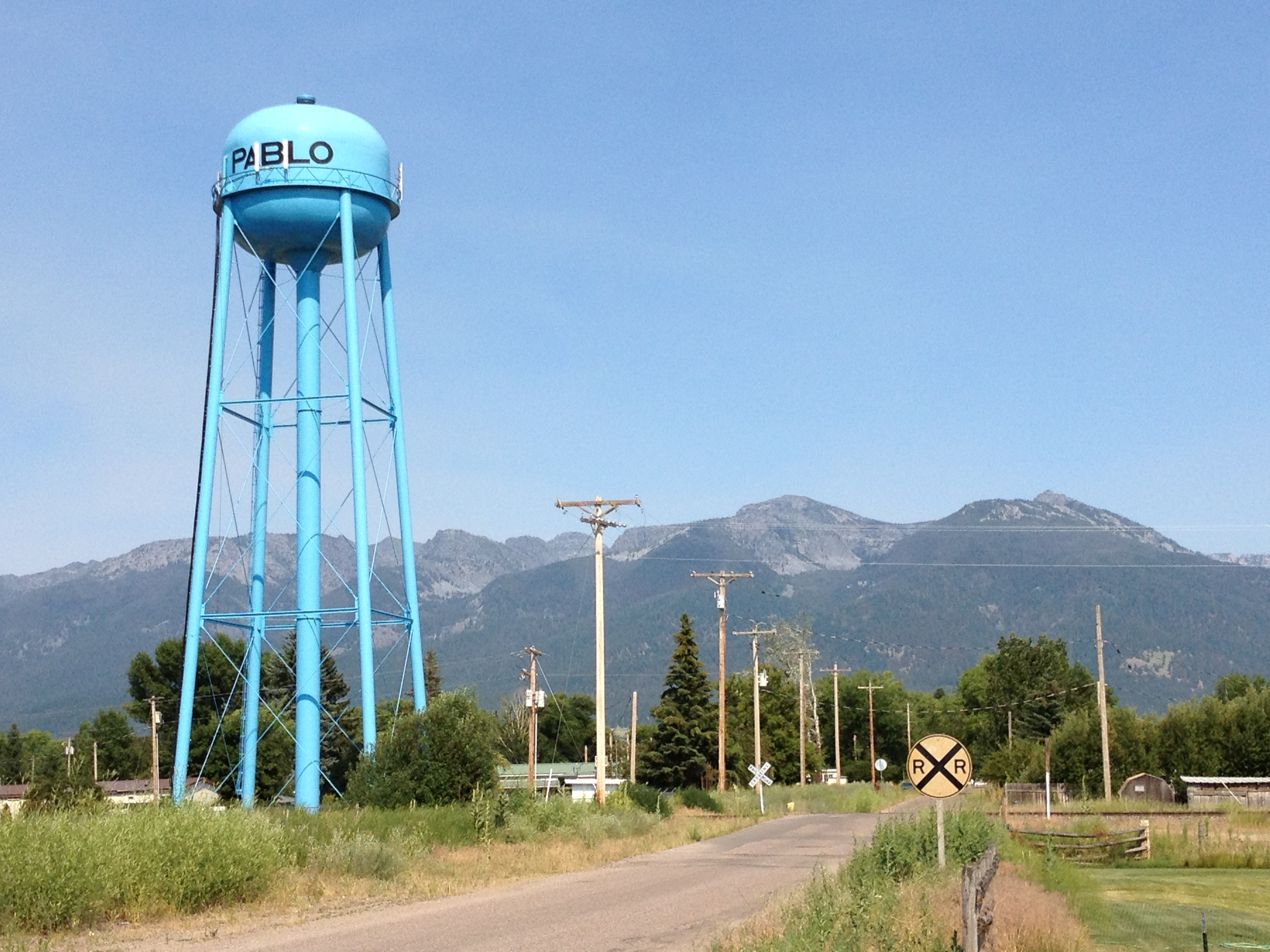
Blue water tower and railroad crossing in Pablo, Montana, July 15, 2013.

Pablo is a census-designated place (CDP) in Lake County, Montana, United States. The population was 2,138 at the 2020 census. It is the home of Salish Kootenai College and the seat of government of the Flathead Indian Reservation.

== History ==
Pablo got its start in 1917, when the Northern Pacific Railway completed a branch line between Sčilíp (formerly known as Dixon) and Polson. It takes its name from Michel Pablo, known for his efforts to save the American bison from extinction.

=== People's Center fire ===
On September 6, 2020, an arsonist set fire to the People's Center, an education center and museum space for Flathead history and culture. The center lost its repository room, offices, and commercial room were lost in the blaze, but the foyer, education room, and museum area survived. Much of the surviving collection has presently been moved to the Dr. Joe McDonald Health and Activity Center, which resides on the campus of Salish Kootenai College.

The suspect, a 33-year-old male, died at the scene. Doors had been barricaded from within, resulting in an increased difficulty for the firefighters at the scene.

== Geography ==
It is near Pablo National Wildlife Refuge.

According to the United States Census Bureau, the CDP has a total area of 4.9 square miles (12.6 km^{2}), of which 1.2 acres (4,893 m^{2}), or 0.04%, are water.

=== Climate ===
This climatic region is typified by large seasonal temperature differences, with warm to hot (and often humid) summers and cold (sometimes severely cold) winters. According to the Köppen Climate Classification system, Pablo has a humid continental climate, abbreviated "Dfb" on climate maps.

== Demographics ==
Historical population
Census	Pop.	Note	%±
2000	1,814		—
2010	2,254		24.3%
2020	2,138		−5.1%
U.S. Decennial Census

=== 2020 census ===
As of the 2020 census, Pablo had a population of 2,138. The median age was 29.5 years. 32.4% of residents were under the age of 18 and 11.4% of residents were 65 years of age or older. For every 100 females there were 95.6 males, and for every 100 females age 18 and over there were 89.1 males age 18 and over.

0.0% of residents lived in urban areas, while 100.0% lived in rural areas.

There were 745 households in Pablo, of which 39.9% had children under the age of 18 living in them. Of all households, 33.4% were married-couple households, 24.6% were households with a male householder and no spouse or partner present, and 31.1% were households with a female householder and no spouse or partner present. About 29.0% of all households were made up of individuals and 9.9% had someone living alone who was 65 years of age or older.

There were 832 housing units, of which 10.5% were vacant. The homeowner vacancy rate was 2.2% and the rental vacancy rate was 5.8%.

Racial composition as of the 2020 census
Race	Number	Percent
White	709	33.2%
Black or African American	1	0.0%
American Indian and Alaska Native	1,183	55.3%
Asian	7	0.3%
Native Hawaiian and Other Pacific Islander	3	0.1%
Some other race	17	0.8%
Two or more races	218	10.2%
Hispanic or Latino (of any race)	131	6.1%

=== 2000 census ===
As of the 2000 census, there were 1,814 people, 622 households, and 475 families residing in the CDP. The population density was 372.5 inhabitants per square mile (143.8/km^{2}). There were 674 housing units at an average density of 138.4 per square mile (53.4/km^{2}). The racial makeup of the CDP was 51.16% Native American, 43.44% White, 0.17% African American, 0.11% Asian, 0.06% Pacific Islander, 0.72% from other races, and 4.36% from two or more races. Hispanic or Latino of any race were 3.31% of the population.

There were 622 households, out of which 47.7% had children under the age of 18 living with them, 45.2% were married couples living together, 22.7% had a female householder with no husband present, and 23.5% were non-families. 20.4% of all households were made up of individuals, and 6.4% had someone living alone who was 65 years of age or older. The average household size was 2.89 and the average family size was 3.27.

In the CDP, the population was spread out, with 38.5% under the age of 18, 9.9% from 18 to 24, 27.9% from 25 to 44, 17.0% from 45 to 64, and 6.7% who were 65 years of age or older. The median age was 26 years. For every 100 females, there were 90.3 males. For every 100 females age 18 and over, there were 86.8 males.

The median income for a household in the CDP was $26,771, and the median income for a family was $28,615. Males had a median income of $20,982 versus $19,907 for females. The per capita income for the CDP was $14,672. About 22.7% of families and 28.1% of the population were below the poverty line, including 30.2% of those under age 18 and 9.2% of those age 65 or over.

== Education ==
Pablo is home to Salish Kootenai College, a tribally controlled college chartered in 1977. It became independent of the local community college in 1981 and expanded its programs. It offers both two-year and four-year degrees, and serves three satellite campuses in eastern Washington state.

The community has two elementary schools, a middle school and Two Eagle River School, the high school. In the 2021-2022 school year, Two Eagle River had 62 students for 8th to 12th grade.

Two Eagle River School is a Class C high school, a designation which helps determine athletic competitions. They are known as the Eagles.

== Media ==
The Char-Koosta News is the newspaper serving the Flathead Indian Reservation. The Valley Journal provides local news to Arlee, Charlo, Pablo, Polson, Ronan, and St. Ignatius.

The FM radio station KQRK is licensed in Pablo. It airs a country music format.

== Infrastructure ==
U.S. Route 93 passes through Pablo, east of the town center. The highway leads north 8 miles (13 km) to Polson, the county seat, and south 5 miles (8 km) to Ronan.

Ronan Airport is a public use airport north of town.

St. Luke Community Healthcare has both a hospital and clinic in Ronan.

In 2023, the first phase of the Ronan Health Center was completed.
