= Confederated Salish and Kootenai Tribes =

Native American tribe in Montana

Confederated Salish & Kootenai Tribes of the Flathead Reservation
Séliš
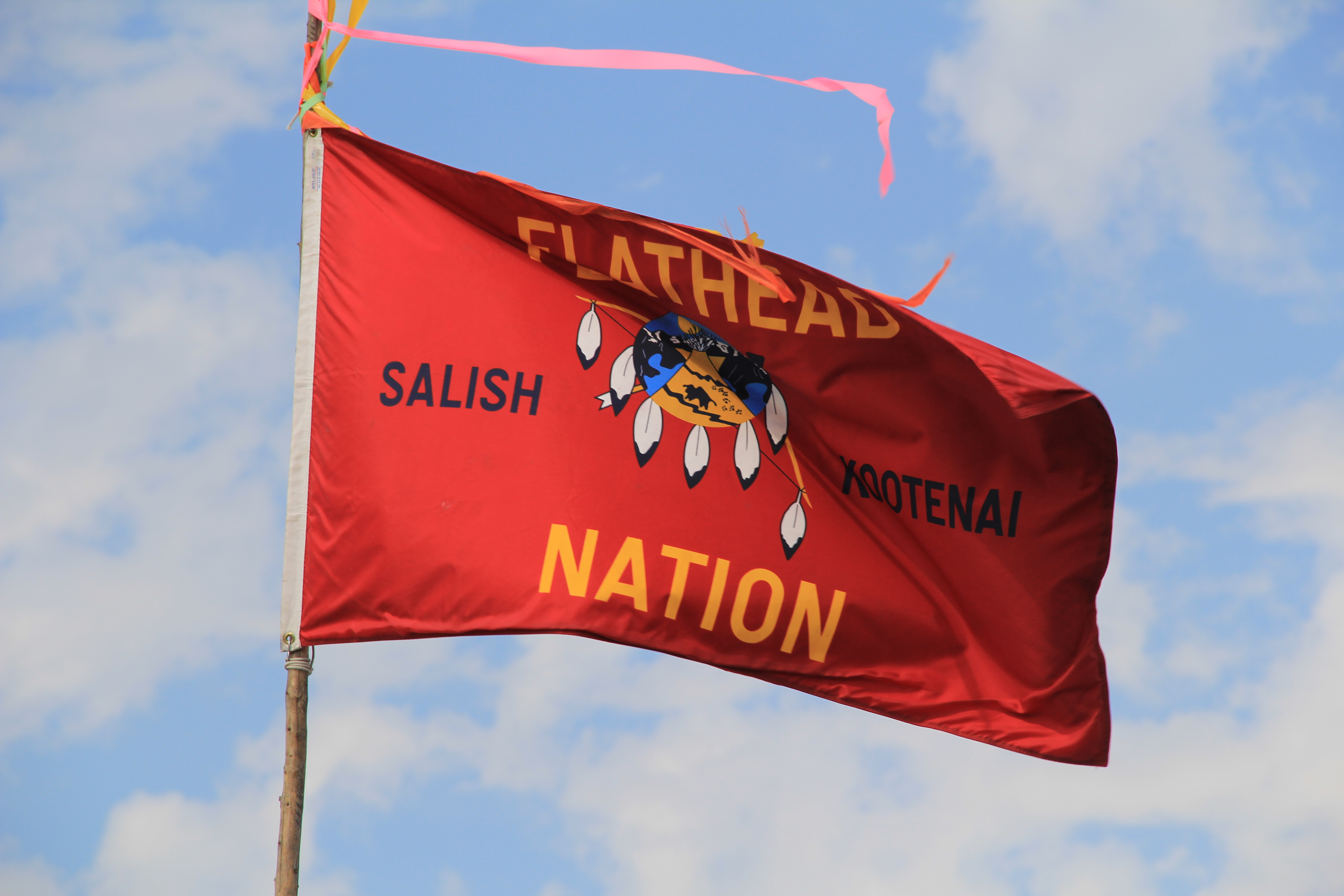
- Flathead Nation flag

Total population
- 7,753

Regions with significant populations
- Montana, U.S.

Languages
- Séliš language, English

Related ethnic groups
- Other Interior Salish peoples

The Confederated Salish and Kootenai Tribes of the Flathead Reservation (Montana Salish: Séliš u Ql̓ispé, Kutenai: k̓upawiȼq̓nuk) are a federally recognized tribe centered on the Flathead Indian Reservation in the U.S. state of Montana. The tribe includes Kutenai, Bitterroot Salish, and Upper Pend d'Oreilles people, the later two are Interior Salish peoples.

The Bitterroot Salish were referred to by Euro-American explorers as Flathead Indians. This name was originally applied to various Salish peoples after Europeans misinterpreted their identifying Coast Salish Sign Language sign to mean that they practiced artificial cranial deformation. This sign involved pressing both hands to the opposite sides of the head and meant, "We the people.”

The peoples of these tribes originally lived in the areas of Montana, parts of Idaho, British Columbia, and Wyoming. The original territory comprised about 22,000,000 acres (89,000 km^{2}) at the time of the 1855 Hellgate treaty.

== Demographics ==
The tribe has about 7,753 citizens members with approximately 5,000 tribal citizens living on the Flathead Reservation. Their predominant religion is Roman Catholicism. 1,100 Native Americans from other tribes and more than 10,000 non-Native Americans also live on the reservation.

== Culture ==
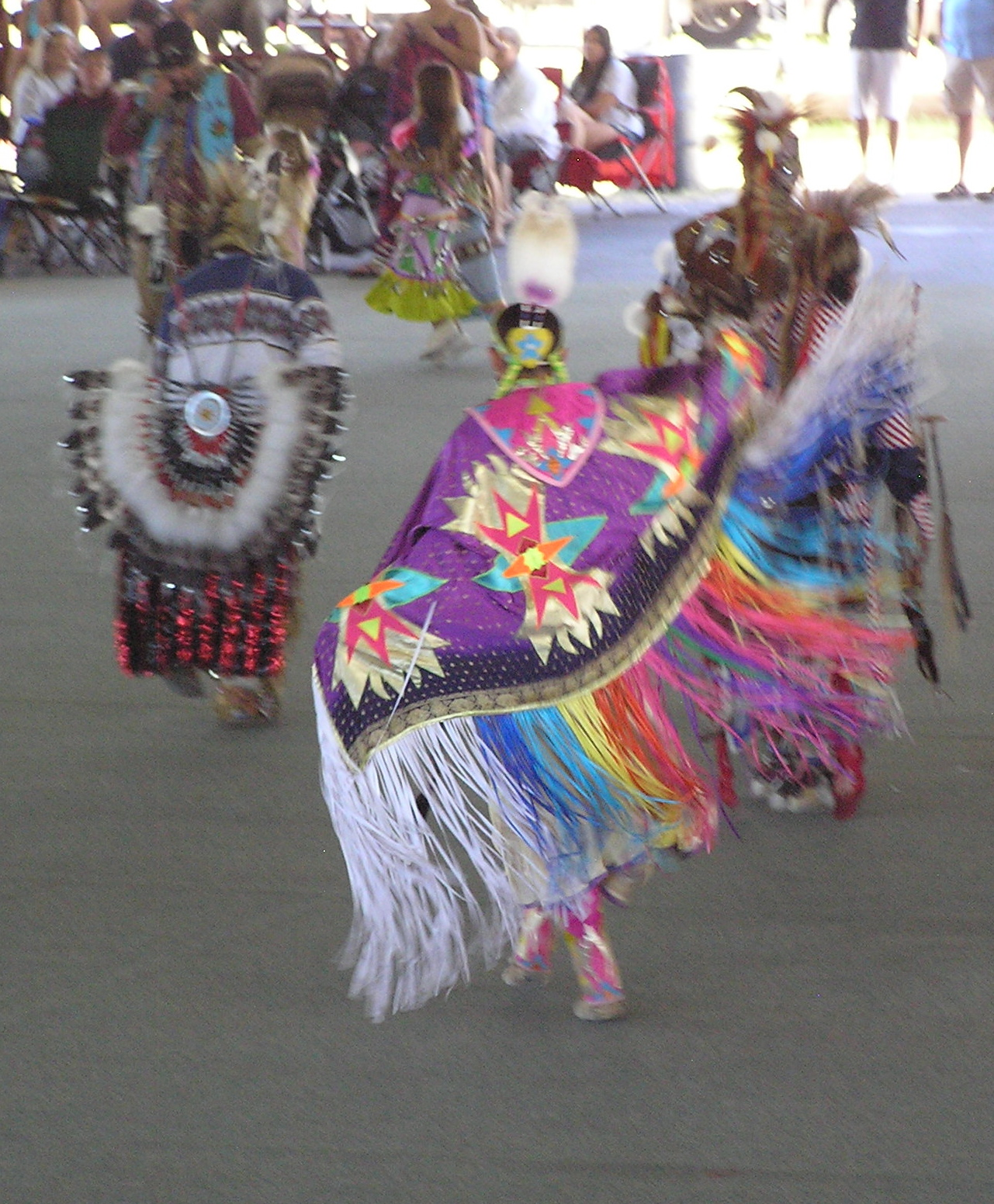
Arlee Celebration Powwow

The People's Center Museum opened in 1995 in Pablo, Montana. Now called the Three Chiefs Cultural Center in Pablo, Montana, the museum hosts rotating exhibitions of Salish and Kootenai cultural artifacts. The museum is supplemented with an oral tradition of storytelling that explains the significance of the pieces on display and shares the stories of the people who lived in the time before and during the European invasion.

Every July, the tribe hosts the Arlee Esyapqeyni Powwow in Arlee, Montana. This celebration includes community meals, the honoring of elders, drumming contests, various traditional dancing competitions for children, teens, adults, and elders, basketball tournaments, and more.

== Language ==
The Bitterroot Salish, Pend d'Oreilles, and Flathead speak the Salish–Spokane–Kalispel language, which belongs to the Interior Salish languages within the Salishan language phylum.

In 1988, the Self-Governance Demonstration Project of the Confederated Salish and Kootenai Tribes (CSKT) was successful, and the U.S. government returned full autonomy to their tribal leadership in 1993. Over the following decades the CSKT has reverted to traditional governance in which Elders provide counsel, to the chief, on tribal policies, culture and education, and in turn tribal policies have grown out of a desire to strengthen the community's ties to their cultural heritage.

In a move to self-identify and push back against the effects of the Indian Termination policy, namely assimilation, in 2016 the tribe chose to change their name from the anglicized "Salish-Pend d'Oreille" to Séliš-Ql̓ispé. The change was part of a wider movement to include more Salishan in the community's daily lives.

For the Séliš-Ql̓ispé, language and culture are entwined — through oral histories, food practices, horticulture, environment, and spirituality. By reviving the language, they hope to also reclaim their identity, their health, and their culture.

Community efforts to revitalize the Salishan language and culture, aside from efforts to teach classes on language (in some cases, full-immersion into the language with no falling back onto English), include such things as virtual tours and museums, such as the Sq'éwlets, which is a Stó:lō-Coast Salish Community in the Fraser River Valley.

== Government ==
The tribe is headquartered in Pablo, Montana. It is governed by a democratically elected ten-person council.

The Tribal Council has ten members, and the council elects from within the roles of: Chairman, Vice Chairman, Secretary, and Treasurer. The tribal government offers a number of services to tribal members and is the chief employer on the reservation. The tribes operate a tribal college, the Salish Kootenai College, and a heritage museum.

The Confederated Salish and Kootenai Tribes were the first to organize a tribal government under the 1934 Indian Reorganization Act. They adopted and ratified their own formal constitution, called the "Constitution and Bylaws of the Salish and Kootenai Tribes of the Flathead Reservation of Montana" on October 28, 1935. This Constitution outlines ten articles that define territory of the tribe, membership requirements and rights, the establishment, election, and governing principles of the Tribal Council, a Bill of Rights, land ownership and use rights, along with referendum and amendment regulations. The separate Bylaws contain three articles that define the roles and responsibilities of the Tribal Council, Council meeting operations, ordinance and resolution processes, and a mechanism allowing for changes to the Constitution and the process required by the Bureau of Indian Affairs.

=== Priorities ===
In 2021 and 2022, Tribal Council reviewed top resolutions and identified priorities for the government to address. In refocusing attention on highest priority needs, the Tribe is able to streamline resources towards goals that not only align with their Mission and Values, but to address the health, welfare, and general needs of their members.

Specific goals include integrating traditional cultural values and languages into daily life, working to foster business ownership among tribal members, and directing necessary resources to combat homelessness, hunger, and addiction. They also want to facilitate earning opportunities and jobs for tribal members. They identified climate change as a risk and have multiple avenues for mitigation. They also want to address mental health concerns and addiction across the reservation.

== Reservation ==
The Flathead Reservation in northwest Montana is more 1,200,000 acres (4,900 km^{2}) in size.

The Tribal Council represents eight districts:

- Arlee District
- Sčilíp District
- Elmo District
- Hot Springs District
- Pablo District
- Polson District
- Ronan District
- St. Ignatius District

During World War II, a 422-foot (129 m) Liberty Ship, the SS Chief Charlot, was named in his honor and built in Richmond, California, in 1943.

Map of the Flathead Reservation and nearby reservations (In light blue).

== Economy ==
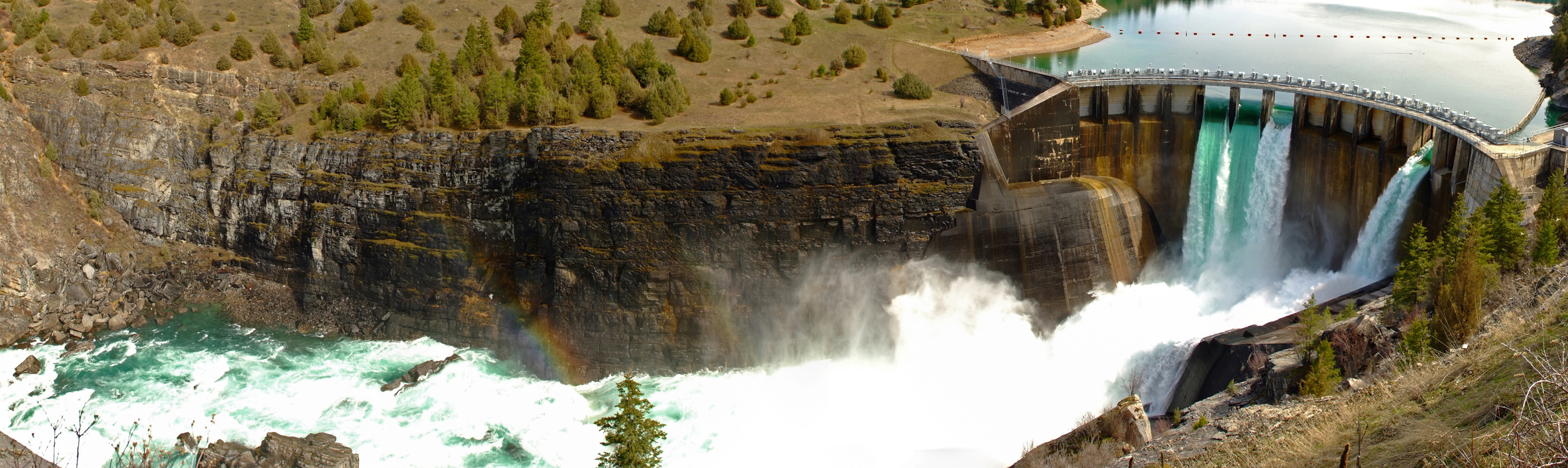
Séliš Ksanka Ql'ispé Dam, formerly known as Kerr Dam, was completed in 1938 and dams the Flathead River a few miles below Flathead Lake southwest of Polson, Montana, 2017

Timber is the primary industry on the reservation. The tribes are the biggest employers on the reservation. In 2011, they provided 65% of all jobs.

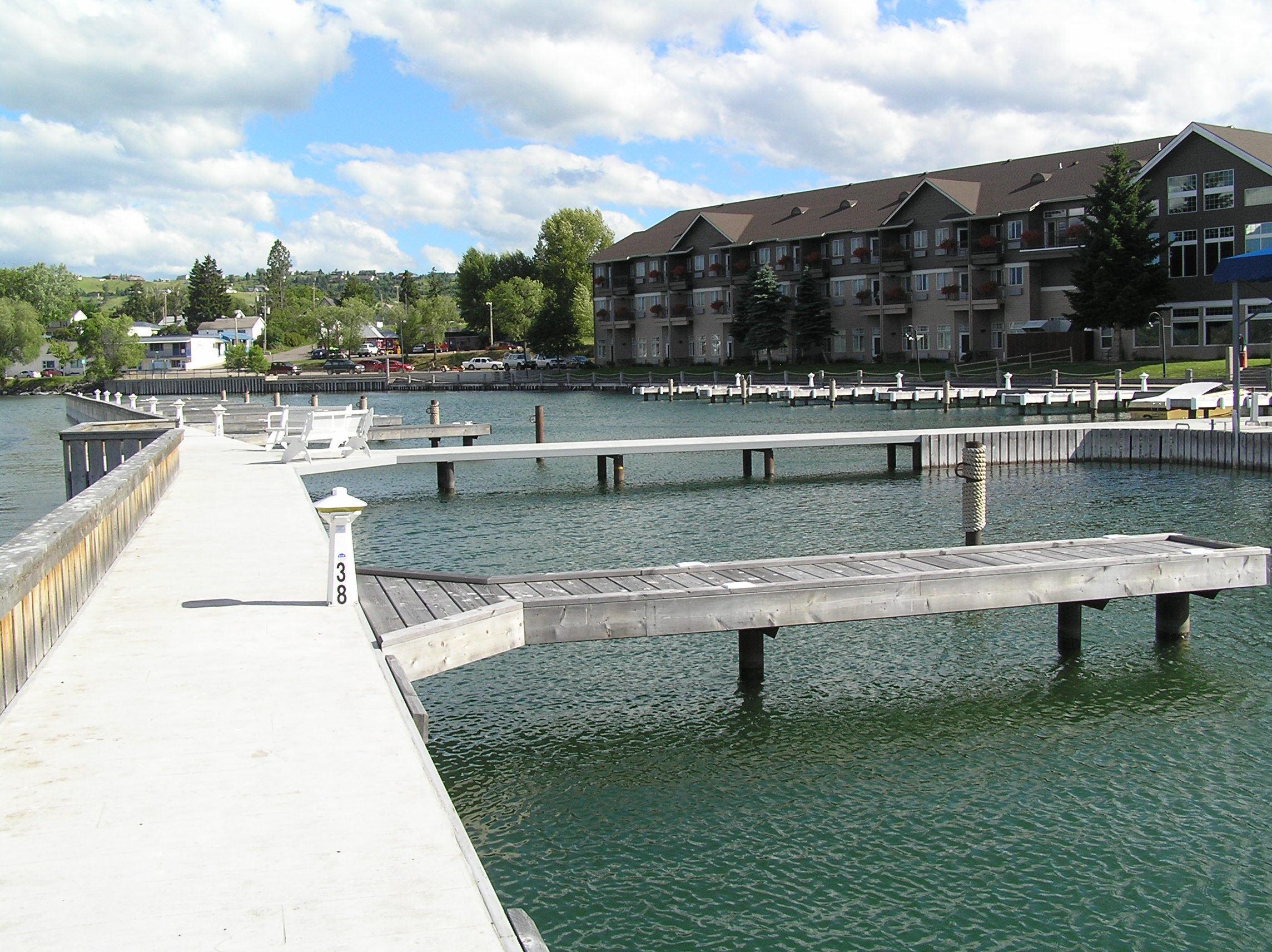
KwaTuqNuk Resort

The tribes own and jointly operate a valuable hydropower dam, called Séliš Ksanka Ql'ispé Dam, formerly known as Kerr Dam. They are the first Indian nation in the United States to own a hydroelectric dam. CSKT operates the only local electricity provider Mission Valley Power. They own S&K Electronics, founded in 1984, and the internationally operating S&K Technologies, founded in 1999.

Other tribal businesses are the KwaTaqNuk Resort & Casino in Polson, the county seat of Lake County and most populous community on the reservation, and the Gray Wolf Peak Casino in Evaro, Montana.

Tourism is another large sector of revenue for the Salish and Kootenai Tribe. Flathead Lake is a 197-square-foot lake where nearly 50% of it is within the boundaries of the Flathead Reservation. The Tribe regulates recreational activities, such as hunting, fishing, camping, and other water sports on the lake within its boundaries. Flathead Lake, the National Bison Range, and Wild Horse Island State Park attract tourists, supporting the local tourism economy.

== History ==
=== Early territory ===
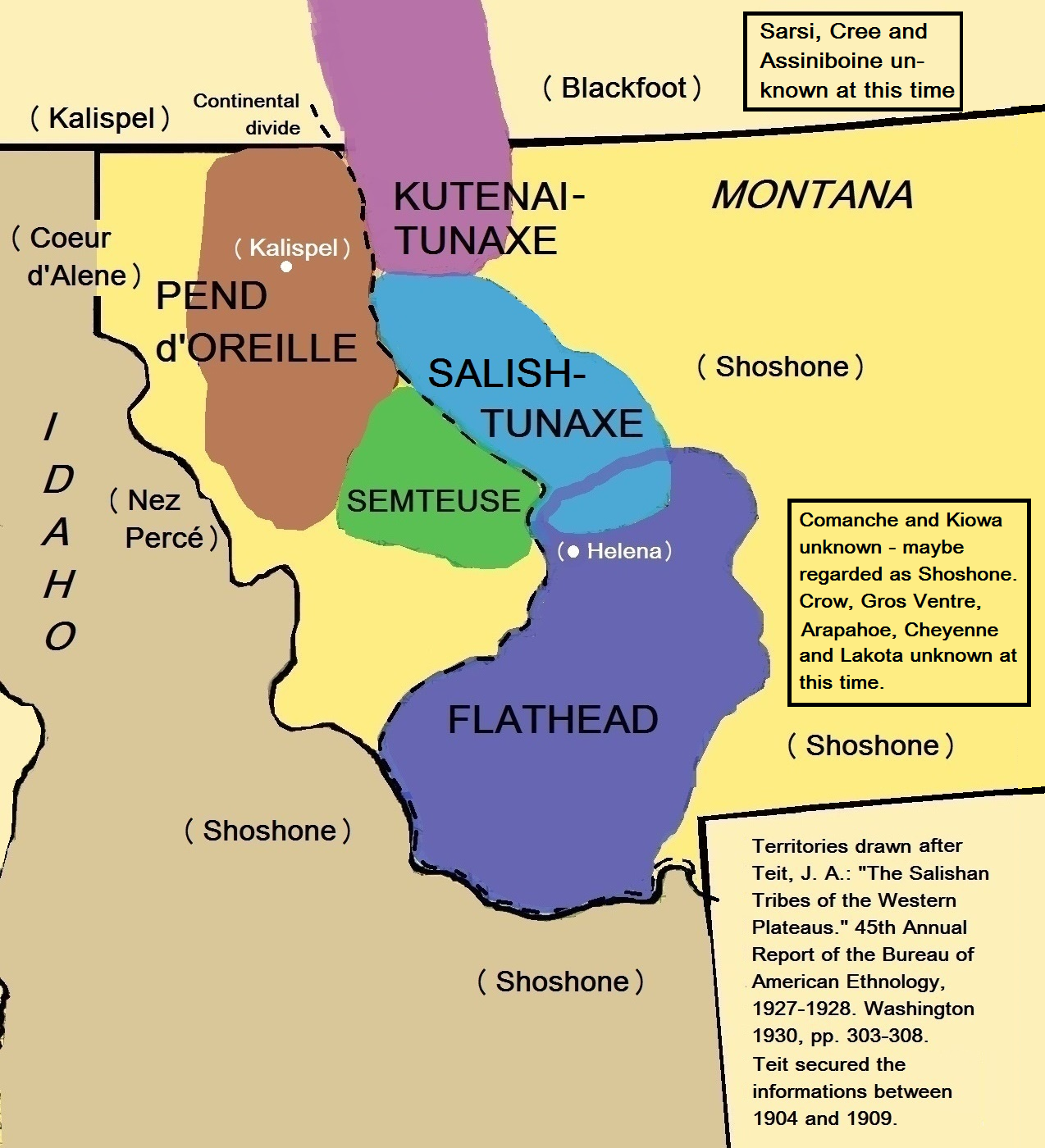
Territories of the Salish (Flathead), Salish-Tunaxe, Kutenai-Tunaxe, Pend d'Oreille, and Semteuse (ca. 1700)

The Flathead and the Pend d'Oreille both agree that the Flathead once occupied a large territory on the plains east of the Rocky Mountains. This tribal homeland included the present-day counties of Broadwater, Jefferson, Deer Lodge, Silver Bow, Madison and Gallatin and parts of Lewis & Clark, Meagher and Park. This was about the time when they got the first horses.

The tribe consisted of at least four bands. Respectively, they had winter quarters near present-day Helena, near Butte, east of Butte and in the Big Hole Valley.

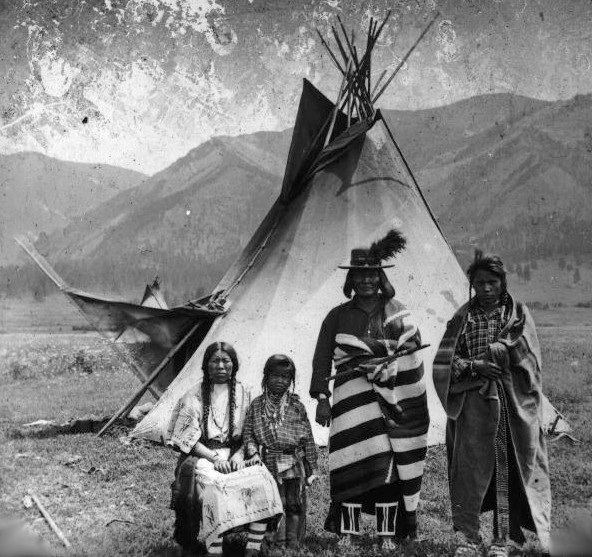
A Flathead family

The Salish (Flatheads) initially lived entirely east of the Continental Divide. They established their headquarters near the eastern slope of the Rocky Mountains. Occasionally, hunting parties went west of the Continental Divide but not west of the Bitterroot Range. The easternmost edge of their ancestral hunting forays was bordered by the Gallatin Range, Crazy Mountain Range, and Little Belt Range.

=== Nearby peoples ===
The Salis-Tunaxe lived immediately to the north of the Flathead. There was no sharp line between the two tribal territories, and the people in the border zone often intermarried. Further north lived the Kutenai-Tunaxe (Kootenai-Tunaxe). To the east of them lived the Salisan tribes' common enemy, the Blackfoot.

West of the Rocky Mountains lived the Pend d'Oreille, in the territory around Flathead Lake. The south of them was occupied by the Semteuse, in a relatively small area. The numerous Shoshone semi-surrounded the Salish from the northeast to the southwest. It seems the Salish did not know the Comanche and Kiowa at this time. They may have been regarded as bands of Shoshone.

Later well-established plains tribes like the Sarsi, Assiniboine, Cree, Crow, Gros Ventre, Arapaho, Cheyenne and Sioux lived far away. They were unknown to the Salish.

=== Horses and the changed life of the Salish ===
The Salish got horses from the Shoshone, with horses changing the life of the people. When they had had only dogs, the Salish had paid no special attention to the American bison, which they had hunted just like deer and elk. Newly acquired mounts made it possible to overtake the American bison and the secured meat and skins could easily be carried by packhorses. All other hunting game became less important.

Before they had had horses, the Salish had lived in conical tents covered with two to four layers of sewed tule mats, depending on the season. The tipi soon replaced the old lodge. Instead of rawhide bags of many shapes and sizes, the women made parfleches from now on.

=== Forced west of the divide ===
Both the Salish-Tunaxe and the Semteuse were almost "killed off in wars" with the Blackfoot and further reduced by smallpox. Some of the survivors took refuge among the Salish. With the near extinction of the Salish-Tunaxe, the Salish extended their hunting grounds northward to Sun River. Between 1700 and 1750, they were driven back by pedestrian Blackfoot warriors armed with fire weapons. Finally, they were forced out of the bison range and west of the divide along with the Kutenai-Tunaxe.

=== First contact ===
The Flatheads lived now between the Cascade Range and Rocky Mountains. The first written record of the tribes is either from their meeting with trapper Andrew Garcia, explorer David Thompson, or the Lewis and Clark Expedition in September 1805. Lewis and Clark came there and asked for horses, but they eventually ate the horses due to starvation. The Flatheads also appear in the records of the Roman Catholic Church at St. Louis, Missouri, to which they sent four delegations to request missionaries (or "Black Robes") to minister to the tribe. Their request was finally granted, and a number of missionaries, including Pierre-Jean De Smet, were eventually sent. The Flatheads are also located in Sula, Montana.

=== Hellgate Treaty ===
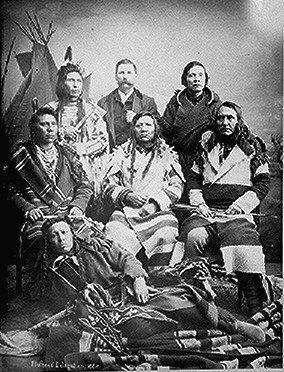
A Flathead delegation in Washington, D.C., with interpreter, 1884

The tribes negotiated the Hellgate Treaty with the United States in 1855. From the start, treaty negotiations were plagued by serious translation problems. A Jesuit observer, Adrian Hoecken, said that the translations were so poor that "not a tenth of what was said was understood by either side." But as in the meeting with Lewis and Clark, the pervasive cross-cultural miscommunication ran even deeper than problems of language and translation. Tribal people came to the meeting assuming they were going to formalize an already-recognized friendship. Non-Indians came with the goal of making official their claims to Native lands and resources.

Isaac Stevens, the new governor and superintendent of Indian affairs for the Washington Territory, was intent on obtaining cession of the Bitterroot Valley from the Salish. Many non-Indians were already well aware of the valley's potential value for agriculture and its relatively temperate climate in winter. Because of the resistance of Chief Victor (Many Horses), Stevens ended up inserting into the Treaty complicated and poorly translated language that defined the Bitterroot Valley south of Lolo Creek as a "conditional reservation" for the Salish.

Victor put his X mark on the document, convinced that the agreement would not require his people to leave their homeland. No other word came from the government for the next fifteen years, so the Salish assumed that they would stay in their Bitterroot Valley forever.

After the 1864 gold rush in the newly established Montana Territory, pressure upon the Salish intensified from both illegal non-Indian squatters and government officials. In 1870, Victor died, and he was succeeded as chief by his son, Chief Charlot, aka Charlo, Claw of the Little Grizzly. Like his father, Charlot adhered to a policy of nonviolent resistance. He insisted on the right of his people to remain in the Bitterroot Valley. But territorial citizens and officials thought the new chief could be pressured into capitulating.

In 1871, they successfully lobbied President Ulysses S. Grant to declare that the survey required by the treaty had been conducted and that it had found that the Jocko (Flathead) Reservation was better suited to the needs of the Salish. On the basis of Grant's executive order, Congress sent a delegation, led by future president James Garfield, to make arrangements with the tribe for their removal. Charlot ignored their demands and even their threats of bloodshed, and he again refused to sign any agreement to leave. U.S. officials then simply forged Charlot's "X" onto the official copy of the agreement that was sent to the Senate for ratification.

Over time, the real reason for the Hellgate treaty meetings became clear to the Salish and Pend d'Oreille people. Under the terms spelled out in the written document, the tribes ceded to the United States more than twenty million acres (81,000 km^{2}) of land and reserved from cession about 1.3 million acres (5,300 km^{2}), forming the Jocko or Flathead Indian Reservation. Conditions had become intolerable for the Salish by the late 1880s, after the Missoula and Bitter Root Valley Railroad was constructed directly through the tribe's lands, with neither permission from the native owners nor payment to them.

In November 1889, Charlot signed an agreement to leave the Bitterroot Valley. Inaction by Congress delayed the removal for another two years. According to some observers, the tribe's desperation reached a level of outright starvation. In October 1891, a contingent of troops from Fort Missoula forced Charlot and the Salish out of the Bitterroot and roughly marched the small band sixty miles to the Flathead Reservation.

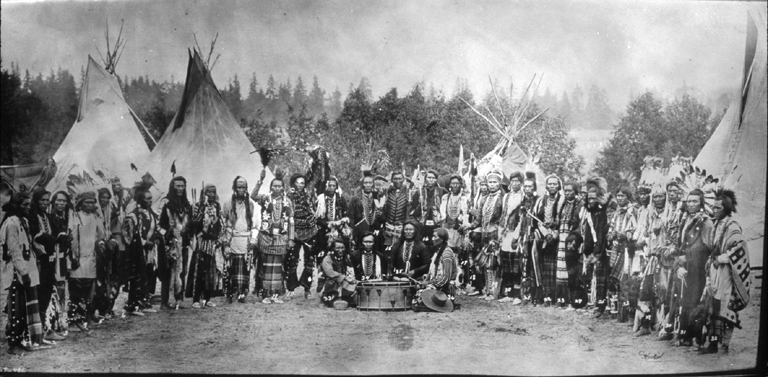
Salish men near tipis, 1903, Flathead Reservation, Montana

The three main tribes moved to the Flathead Reservation were the Bitterroot Salish, the Pend d'Oreille, and the Kootenai. The Bitterroot Salish and the Pend d'Oreille tribes spoke dialects of the same Salish language.

A dispute over off-reservation hunting between a band of Pend d'Oreilles and the state of Montana's Fish and Game department resulted in the Swan Valley Massacre of 1908.

=== Allotment Act ===
In 1887, the United States enacted the Dawes Act, otherwise known as the General Allotment Act. Under this new law, all reservation lands could be segmented into parcels and distributed to tribes based on their enrolled membership and heads of households. Land that was not allotted to a tribal member was subject to being sold to the federal government with the intention of repurposing the land for public use. Because tribal members were now granted their own parcels of land on the reservation, they had individual rights of ownership. Many members sold their land to non-tribal members during the Great Depressio through World War II, leaving the reservation to seek work off the reservation in nearby states. This resulted in the reservation no longer being solely occupied by the Salish and Kootenai tribes. The reservation land was distributed in a random "checkerboard" pattern as tribal members sold their land, leading to mixed federal and state jurisdiction over land within the reservation borders.

Later, the Flathead Allotment Act of 1904 was signed into law, splitting tribal lands into individual parcels that were sold to non-Natives for settlement. While reservation land can be owned and settled by non-Natives, they do not hold ownership over tribal interests specifically. Non-Native residents are subject to state and local jurisdiction on their own privately-owned land. Tribal members are subject to federal and tribal jurisdiction. Land on the Flathead Reservation falls into three types of ownership: trust lands held federally for the tribe, allotted trust land held by tribal members, and private-fee lands owned by non-Natives.

Entrance sign to the National Bison Range

=== National Bison Range & Conservation ===
In 1908, President Theodore Roosevelt signed legislation that allowed for 18,700 acres of the Flathead Reservation to be sold to the federal government for use in establishing the National Bison Range at a rate of $1.56 per acre. This national refuge for buffalo was an effort of the federal government to preserve the severely diminishing buffalo herds that resulted from westward expansion, over-hunting, and poaching.

In 1971, in the Confederated Salish and Kootenai Tribes of the Flathead Reservation, Montana v. United States court case, the US Court of Claims deemed that the 1908 seizure of land for the National Bison Range was unconstitutional, particularly because the land was purchased significantly below fair market value. The land was not transferred back to the tribe. Instead, the court awarded the tribe a rate of $14 per acre, based on the fair market value of 1912, which resulted in a total reward of $231,548.

In September 2014, the Confederated Salish and Kootenai Tribes became one of the original eight signatories to the Buffalo Treaty. The Buffalo Treaty aims to restore the cultural significance of buffalo in tribal culture. Their goal is to protect buffalo and preserve historic homelands across the United States and Canada.

In 2021, the Consolidated Appropriations Act (Public Law 116-260) repealed the 1908 law that allowed the creation of the National Bison Range. The federal government reinstated tribal sovereignty over the lands it had previously taken for use of the national park, transferring the land to the Bureau of Indian Affairs to be held in trust for the Salish and Kootenai Tribe. The park, previously under ownership and federal regulation of the U.S. Fish and Wildlife Service, is now under tribal management and care under its Natural Resources Department as of January 2022.

=== Tribal Termination ===
Though marked for termination in 1953 under the House concurrent resolution 108 of the US federal Indian termination policy, and the Termination Act, the tribe resisted the government's plans to terminate their tribal status in Congressional hearings in 1954. With the support of Montana State Senators, State Representatives, and the unanimous and unified Tribal Council and its members, the Salish and Kootenai Tribe defeated the measure and were able to maintain the tribe's federal status.

The Civil Rights Movement throughout the 1960s was widely supported by tribal members. Throughout the 1960s, Native American civil rights activism led to multiple grassroots movements leading up to the passage of the 1968 Indian Civil Rights Act, which is also widely known as the Indian Bill of Rights. It closely mirrors the rights afforded to citizens under the U.S. Bill of Rights.

The momentum of the Civil Rights movement inspired Vic Charlo, a descendent of Chief Charlo and community leader, to lead many efforts to diversify tribal government leaders and encourage the Council to adopt more policies to support poorer members of the tribe and younger generations. The Tribal Council also faced widespread scrutiny by members who sought to terminate the tribe and to liquidate tribal assets in order to disburse the funds and resources to its members, particularly those who no longer lived on the reservation. Tribal liquidation was widely supported by many members who moved off-reservation, to places such as Washington State, Idaho, and other locations in search of work. These members argued that aside from their per-capita payments, they received no other benefits from the tribe because they did not live on the reservation. The termination and liquidation movement failed to earn enough votes to overcome Tribal Council objections.

== Notable tribal citizens ==
- Corwin Clairmont, artist and educator
- Marvin Camel, boxer, WBC & IBF Cruiserweight Champion
- Debra Magpie Earling, author
- Terese Marie Mailhot, author
- D'Arcy McNickle (1904–1977), noted writer, Native American activist, and anthropologist
- Jaune Quick-to-See Smith, artist

== See also ==
- Alameda's hot springs retreat
- Kootenai Tribe of Idaho
- Ktunaxa Kinbasket Tribal Council
