= Salish Kootenai College =

Tribal land-grant community college in Pablo, Montana, U.S.

Coordinates: 47°35′47″N 114°06′39″W

- Motto: Grounded in tradition. Charging into the future.
- Type: tribal land-grant
- Established: 1977
- Affiliations: Bitterroot Salish, Kootenai, and Pend d'Oreilles
- Academic affiliations: American Indian Higher Education Consortium; American Association of Community Colleges; Space-grant
- President: Michael Munson
- Faculty: 138
- Students: 716 (2025-26)
- Postgraduates: 40 (approximate)
- Location: Pablo, Montana, U.S.
- Campus: Rural
- Colors: Gold and black
- Nickname: Bison (Lady Bison)
- Website: www.skc.edu

Salish Kootenai College (SKC) is a tribal land-grant college in Pablo, Montana offering certificate, associate's, bachelor's, and master's degree programs. It serves the Bitterroot Salish, Kootenai, and Pend d'Oreilles tribes. SKC's campus is on the Flathead Reservation. The college enrolled 716 students in 2025-26. Although enrollment is not limited to Native American students, SKC's primary function is to serve the needs of Native American people.

SKC announced it will change its name to Séliš Ksanka Qlispé University during its 50th anniversary in 2027.

== History ==
Prior to 1978, SKC was a branch campus of Flathead Valley Community College (FVCC). SKC is a tribal college, chartered in 1977 under the sovereign governmental authority of the Confederated Salish and Kootenai Tribes. In 1981, the college formally disassociated from FVCC and became completely self-governing. The college was designated a land-grant college in 1994 alongside 31 other tribal colleges.

In 2015, a satellite designed by SKC students and faculty was successfully deployed into low Earth orbit under NASA's CubeSat Launch Initiative, making it the first operational CubeSat designed by a tribal college. BisonSat's primary mission objective is to transmit image data of Earth with a targeted ground sample distance of 100 meters.

Some former employees sued the college in 2017 under the Federal False Claims Act, saying that the administration had falsified student records in order to continue receiving public grant funding from the United States Department of Human Services and the United States Department of Indian Health Services. This suit was dismissed with prejudice in May 2018 by United States District Court, D. Montana, Missoula Division in a determination that the lawsuit violated tribal sovereignty of the Confederation Salish and Kootenai Tribes.

== Academics ==
SKC offers 3 master's degree programs, 19 bachelor's degree programs, 22 associate degree programs, and 12 certificate programs. Although most of the degree programs are career-oriented, students can elect to take courses of study in fields such as the liberal arts and Native American Studies.

In 2021, SKC became the first tribal college to establish a master's degree program in natural resource management.

== Partnerships ==
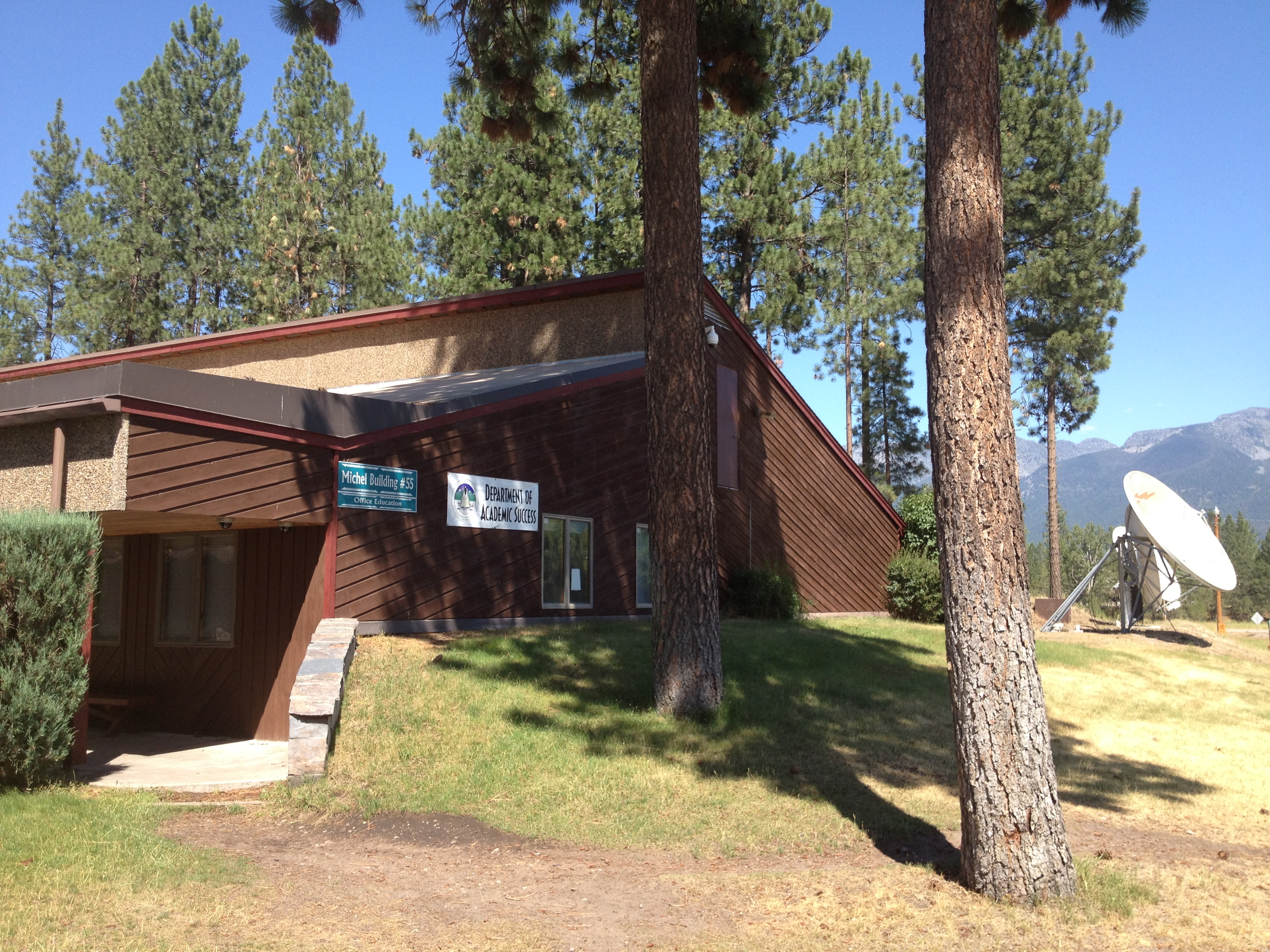
Michel Building at Salish Kootenai College

SKC is a member of the American Indian Higher Education Consortium, a community of tribally and federally chartered institutions working to strengthen tribal nations and make a lasting difference in the lives of American Indians and Alaska Natives. SKC was created to serve the needs of American Indians for higher education. SKC generally serves geographically isolated populations that have no other means to gain higher education beyond the high school level.

== Athletics ==
The sports teams are nicknamed the "Bison" and "Lady Bison". Although they are not within any athletic association. SKCs men's basketball program has won 3 consecutive American Indian Higher Education Consortium Basketball Championships (05, 06, 07) and the women have won 2 (03, 07). The Bison, and Lady Bison also are the current AIHEC champions, both winning the 2014 tournament.

== Scholarships ==
Scholarships are available to Native American students through the American Indian College Fund (AICF).

== See also ==
- Confederated Salish and Kootenai Tribes of the Flathead Nation
- American Indian College Fund (AICF)
