= Billings, Montana =

Largest city in Montana, U.S.

Billings Ammalapáshkuua (Crow) É'êxováhtóva (Cheyenne)
- City
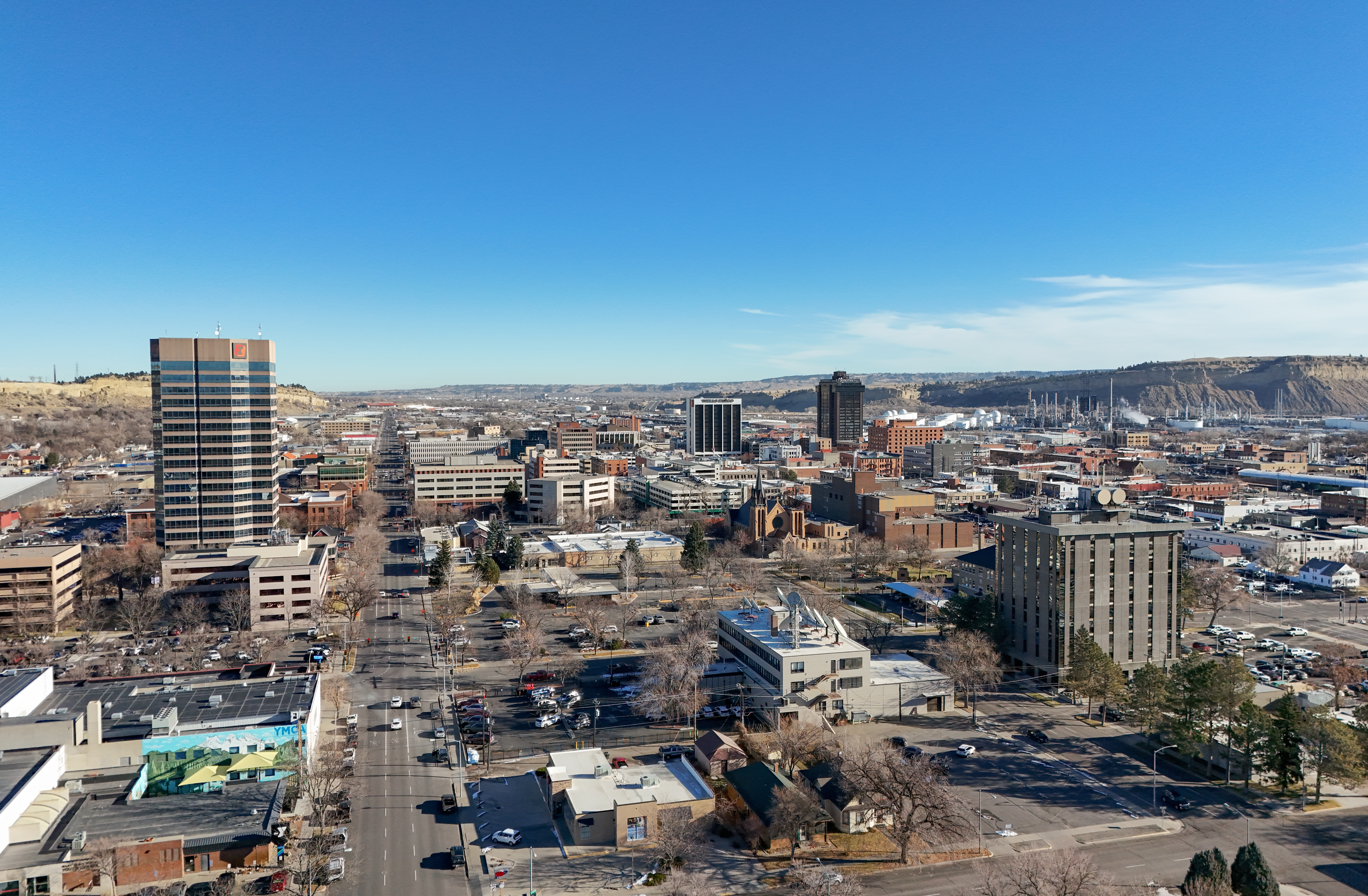
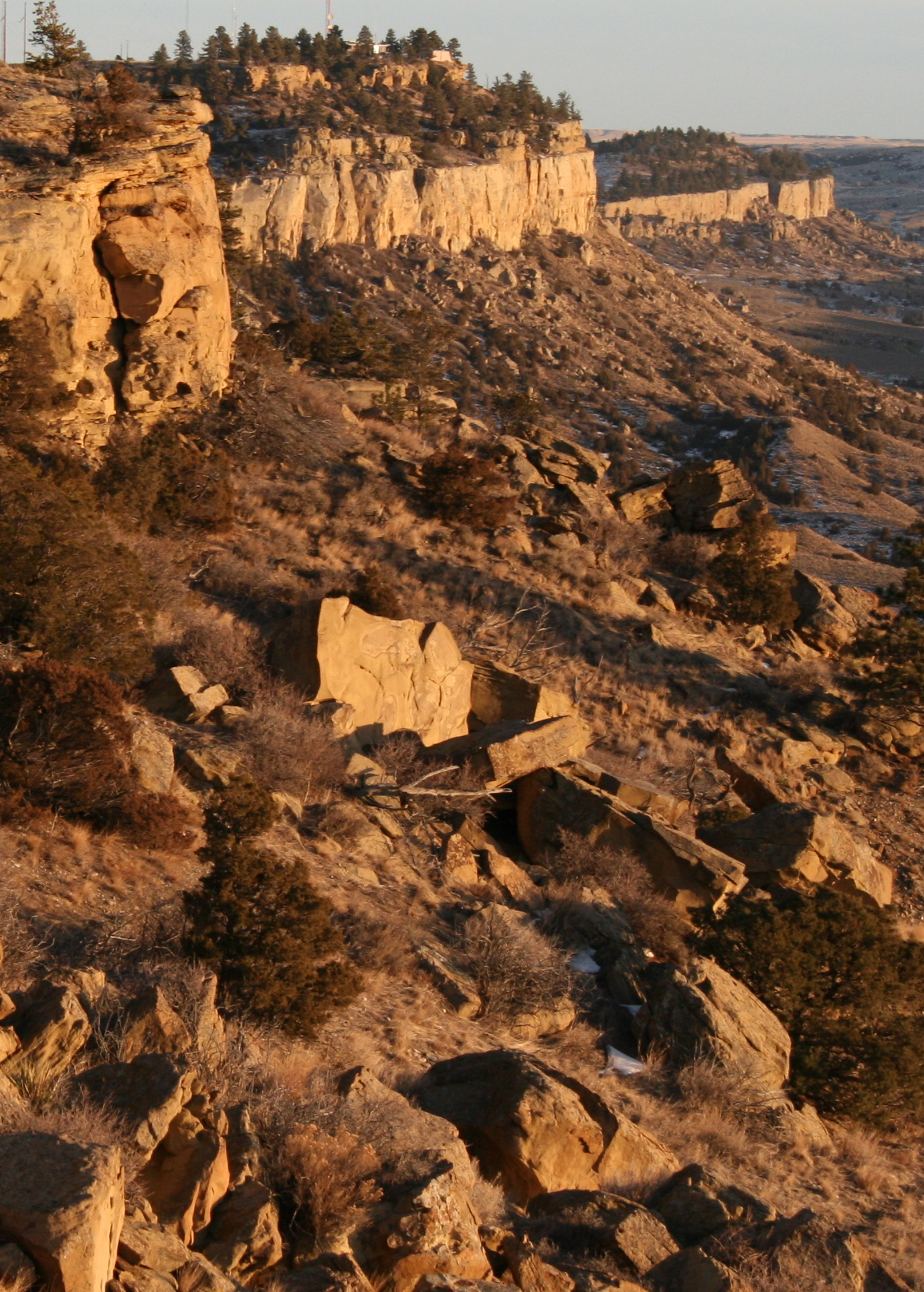
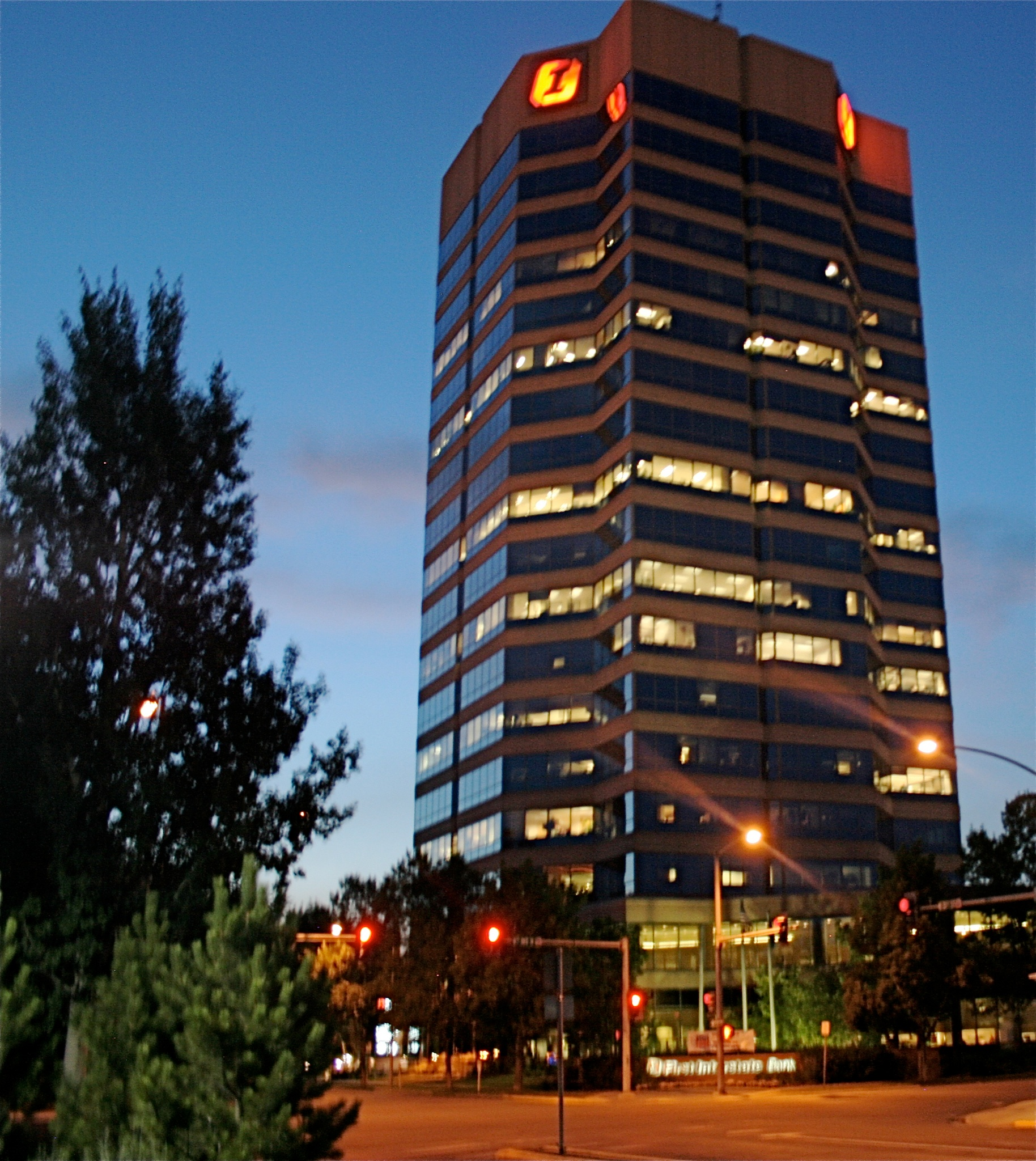
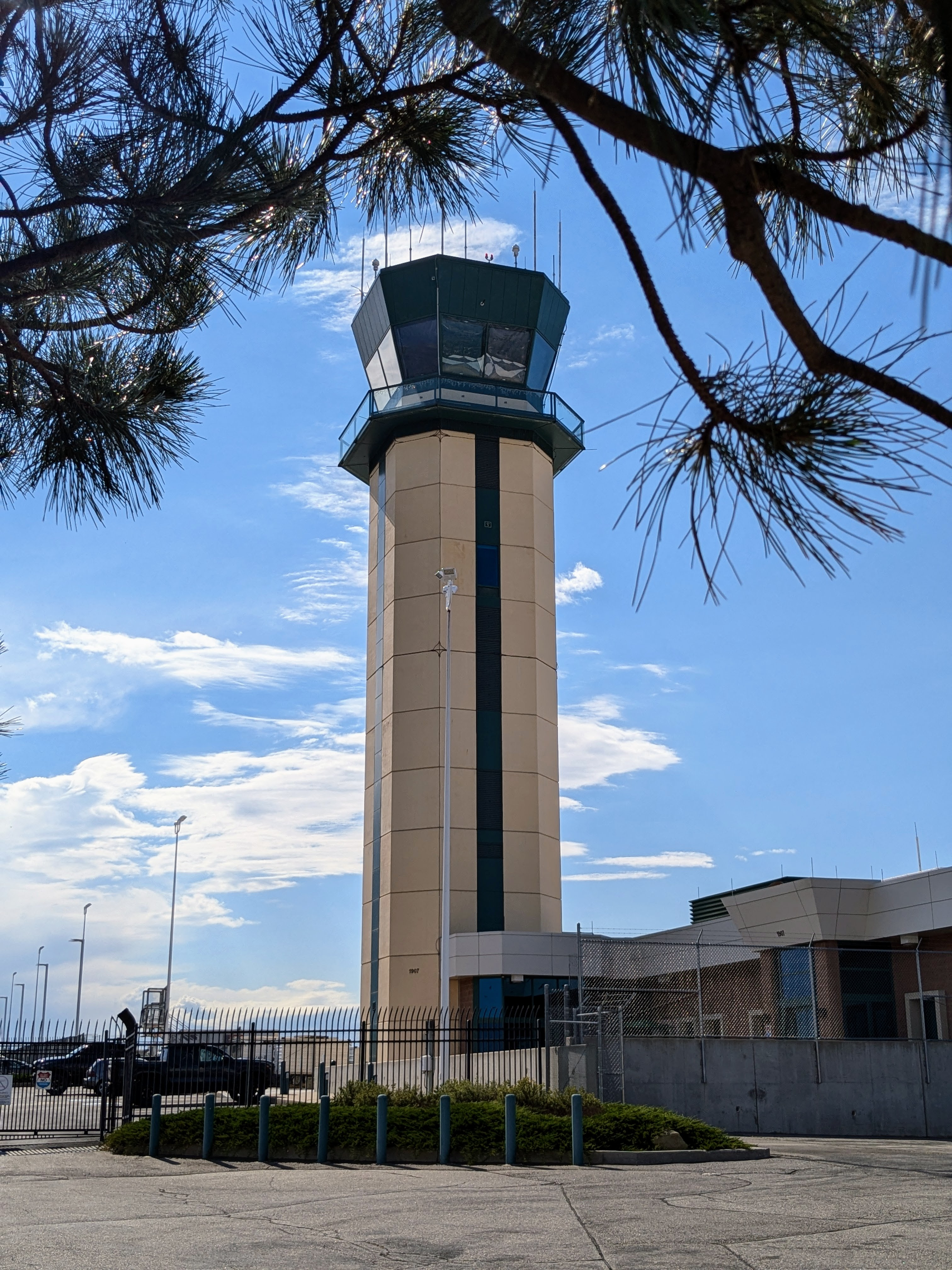
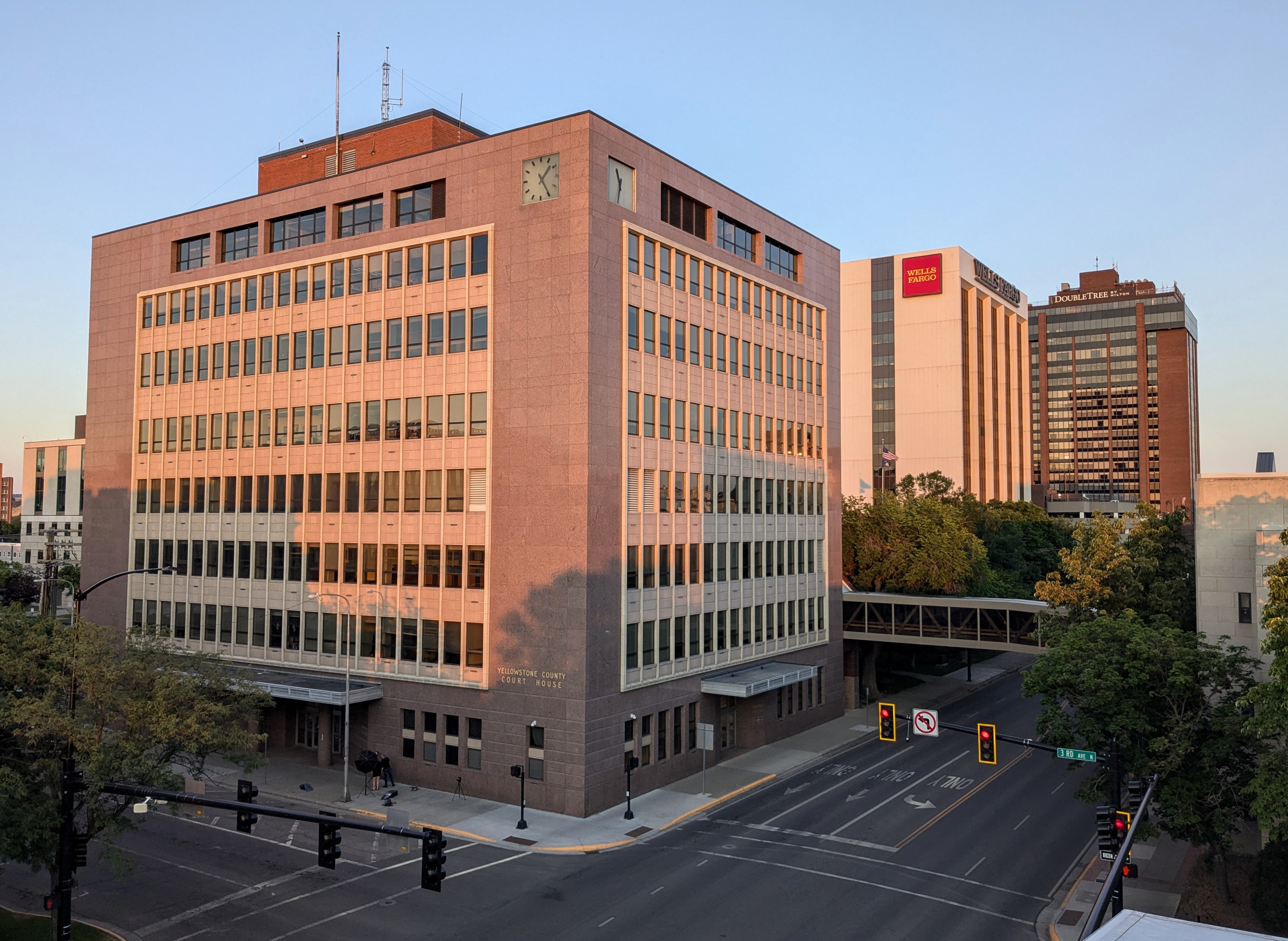
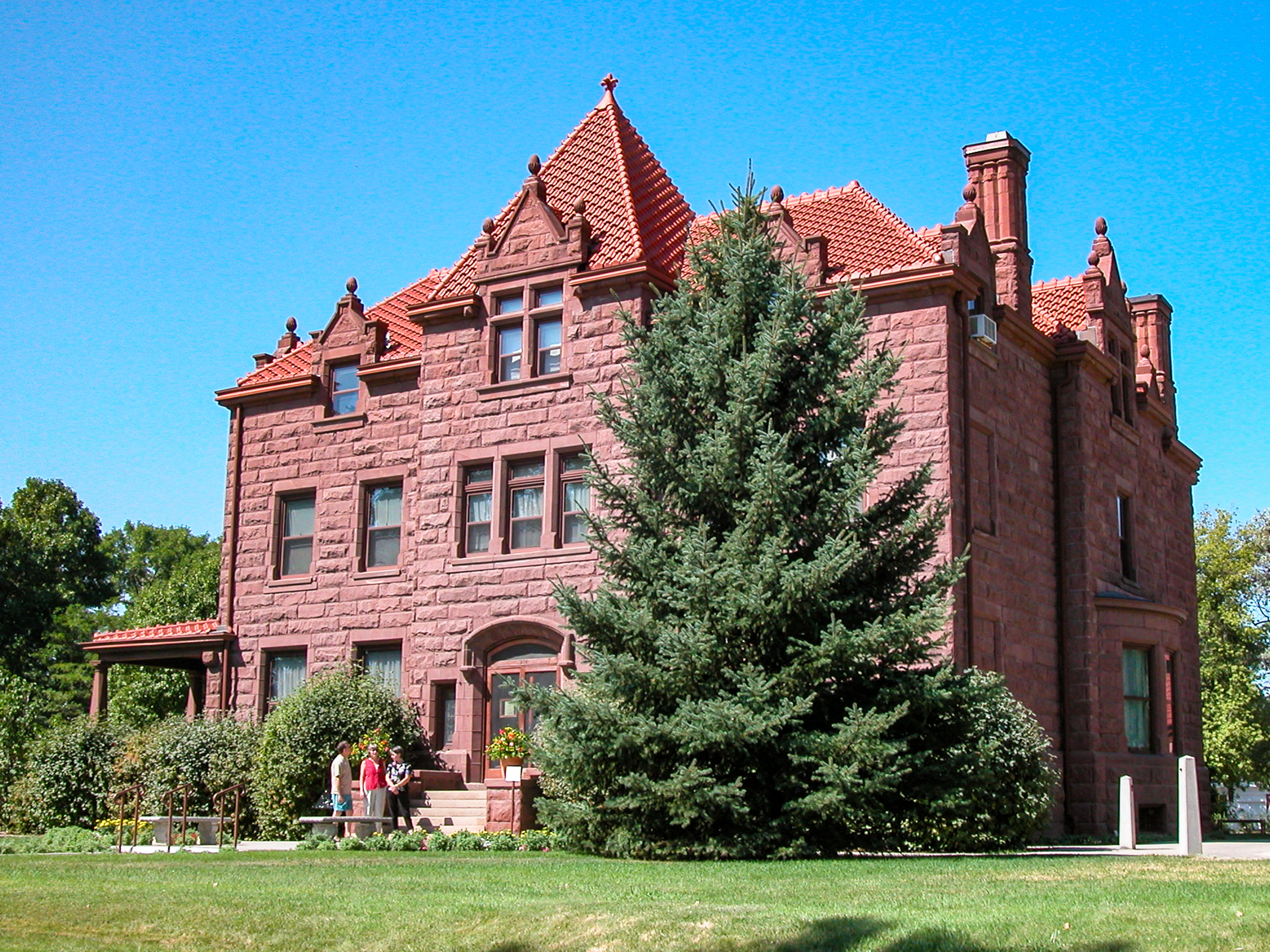
- Billings skyline Four Dances Natural Area First Interstate Center Billings Logan International Airport Yellowstone County Courthouse Moss Mansion

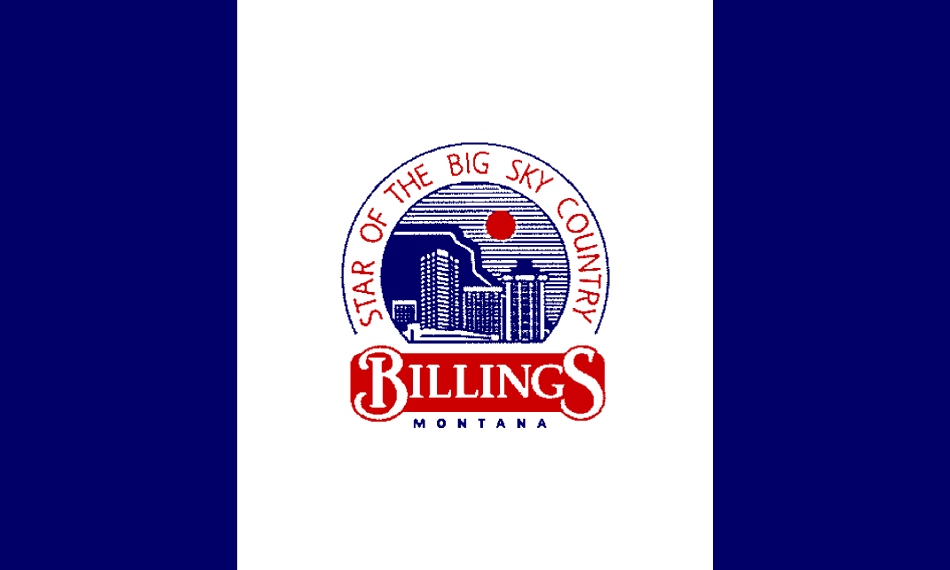
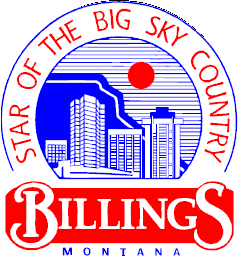
- Flag Seal Logo
- Nicknames: "Magic City", "City by the Rims", "Star of the Big Sky Country", "Montana's Trailhead"
- Interactive map of Billings
- Location within Montana Location within the United States
- Coordinates: 45°47′01″N 108°30′22″W
- Country: United States
- State: Montana
- County: Yellowstone
- Founded: 1877
- Incorporated: March 24, 1882
- Named for: Frederick H. Billings

Government
  - Type: Mayor–council
  - Body: City Council
  - Mayor: Mike Nelson
  - City administrator: Kevin Iffland (interim)

Area
  - City: 45.39 sq mi (117.57 km^{2})
  - Land: 45.29 sq mi (117.29 km^{2})
  - Water: 0.11 sq mi (0.28 km^{2})
- Elevation: 3,212 ft (979 m)

Population (2025)
  - City: 121,239
  - Rank: US: 242nd MT: 1st
  - Density: 2,586/sq mi (998.5/km^{2})
  - Urban: 114,773 (US: 273rd)
  - Metro: 193,603 (US: 232nd)
- Demonym: Billingsite
- Time zone: UTC−7 (Mountain)
  - Summer (DST): UTC−6 (Mountain)
- ZIP codes: 59101-59117
- Area code: 406
- FIPS code: 30-06550
- GNIS feature ID: 2409849
- Website: billingsmt.gov

Billings is the most populous city in the U.S. state of Montana, and the 253rd most populous city in the United States. The population was 117,116 at the 2020 census, while the Billings metropolitan area has an estimated 193,000 people. Located in the south-central portion of the state, it is the county seat of Yellowstone County. Billings is the trade and distribution center for much of Montana east of the Continental Divide and has one of the largest trade areas in the United States. It is also the largest retail destination for much of the same area. The Billings Chamber of Commerce claims the area of commerce covers more than 125,000 square miles (320,000 km^{2}).

Billings was nicknamed the "Magic City" because of its rapid growth from its founding as a railroad town in March 1882. The nearby Crow and Cheyenne peoples call the city Ammalapáshkuua and É'êxováhtóva respectively, meaning 'where they cut wood', named as such because of a sawmill built in the area by early white settlers. The city has experienced rapid growth and maintains a strong economy. From 1969 to 2021, the Billings area population growth was 89%, compared to Montana's overall increase of 59%. With more hotel accommodations than any area within a five-state region, the city hosts a variety of conventions, concerts, sporting events, and other rallies. It provides services to the Bakken oil development 250 to 350 miles to the east, as well as the Heath Shale oil discovery north of Billings.

Attractions in and around Billings include ZooMontana, the Yellowstone Art Museum, Pompey's Pillar, Pictograph Cave, Chief Plenty Coups State Park, Little Bighorn Battlefield, Bighorn Canyon, Red Lodge Mountain, and the Beartooth Highway. The northeast entrance to Yellowstone National Park is a little over 100 miles (160 km) from Billings.

== History ==
=== Name ===
The city is named for Frederick H. Billings, a former president of the Northern Pacific Railroad from Woodstock, Vermont. An earlier name for the area was Clark's Fork Bottom.

The Crow people from the nearby Crow Indian Reservation call the city Ammalapáshkuua. It means 'where they cut wood', and is named as such because of a sawmill built in the area by early white settlers. The Cheyenne from the nearby Northern Cheyenne Indian Reservation refer to the city as É'êxováhtóva, 'sawing place' and the Gros Ventre from the nearby Fort Belknap Indian Reservation refer to it as ʔóhuutébiθɔnɔ́ɔ́nh (lit. 'where they saw lumber'), both also named for the sawmill, or translations of the Crow name.

=== Prehistory ===
The downtown core and much of the rest of Billings is in the Yellowstone Valley, a canyon carved out by the Yellowstone River. Around 80 million years ago, the Billings area was on the shore of the Western Interior Seaway. The sea deposited sediment and sand around the shoreline. As the sea retreated, it left a deep layer of sand. Over millions of years, this sand was compressed into stone known as Eagle Sandstone. Over the last million years the river has carved its way down through this stone to form the canyon walls known as the Billings Rimrocks or the Rims.

The Pictograph Caves are about five miles south of downtown. These caves contain over 100 pictographs (rock paintings), the oldest of which is over 2,000 years old. Approximately 30,000 artifacts (including stone tools and weapons) have been excavated from the site. These excavations have proven the area has been occupied since at least 2600 BC until after AD 1800.

The Crow Indians have called the Billings area home since about 1700. The present-day Crow Nation is just south of Billings.

=== Lewis and Clark Expedition ===
In July 1806, William Clark (of the Lewis and Clark Expedition) passed through the Billings area. On July 25 he arrived at what is now known as Pompey's Pillar and wrote in his journal, "... at 4 P M arrived at a remarkable rock, I ascended this rock and from its top had a most extensive view in every direction." Clark carved his name and the date into the rock, leaving the only remaining physical evidence of their expedition. He named the place Pompey's Tower, naming it after the son of his Shoshone interpreter and guide Sacajawea. In 1965, Pompey's Pillar was designated as a national historic landmark, and was proclaimed a national monument in January 2001. An interpretive center has been built next to the monument.

=== Coulson/Billings ===
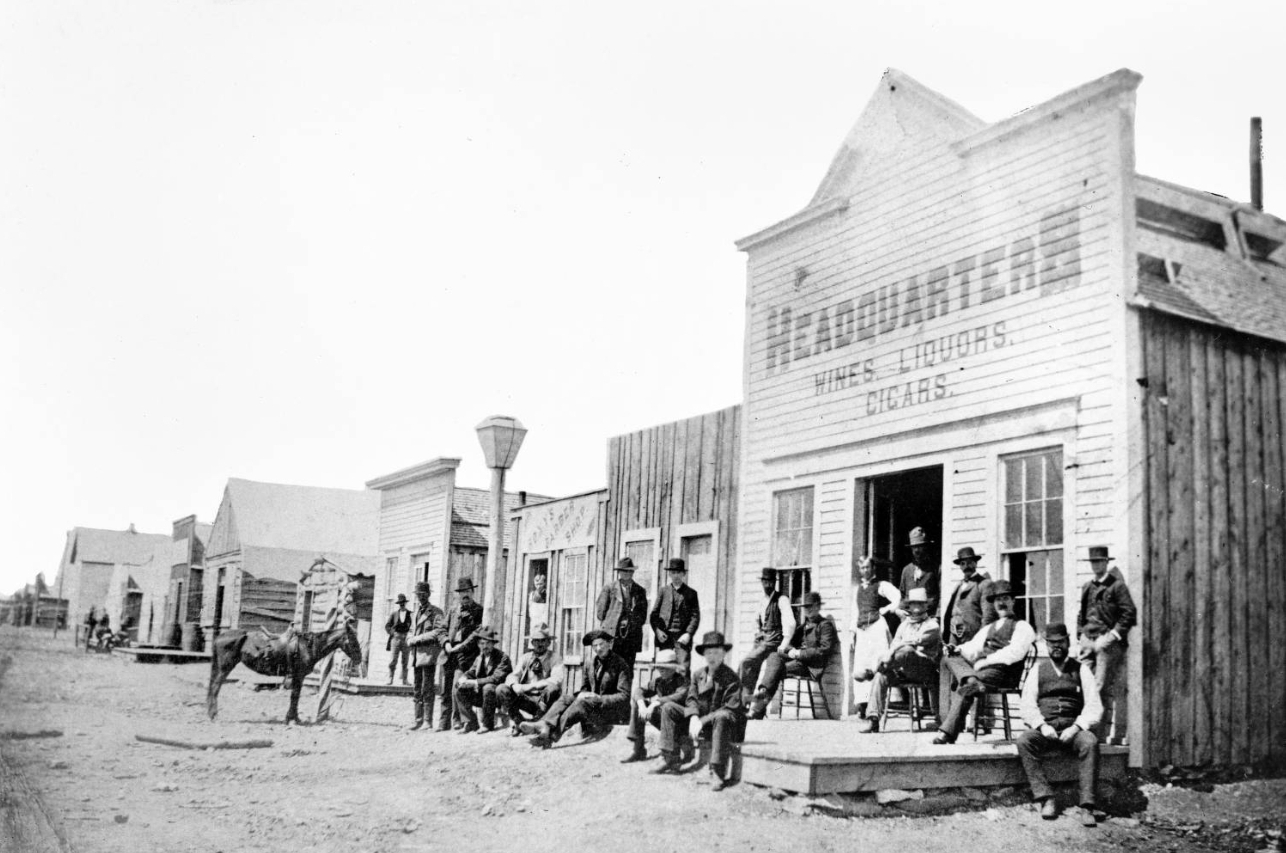
Coulson, Montana

The area where Billings is today was known as Clark's Fork Bottom. Clark's Fork Bottom was to be the hub for hauling freight to Judith and Musselshell Basins. At the time these were some of the most productive areas of the Montana Territory. The plan was to run freight up Alkali Creek, now part of Billings Heights, to the basins and Fort Benton on the Hi-Line.

In 1877, settlers from the Gallatin Valley area of the Montana Territory formed Coulson, the first town of the Yellowstone Valley. The town was started when John Alderson built a sawmill and P. W. McAdow opened a general store and trading post on land Alderson owned on the bank of the Yellowstone River. Other buildings and tents were built as the town began to grow. At this time, before the coming of the railroad, most goods coming to and going from the Montana Territory were carried on paddle riverboats. The town was named Coulson in an attempt to attract the Coulson Packet Company that ran riverboats between St. Louis and many points in the Montana Territory. However, riverboats would only rarely run so far upriver.

Coulson was a rough town of dance halls and saloons and not a single church. Needing a sheriff, Coulson recruited John "Liver-Eating" Johnson. Many disagreements were settled by gunfire, and a graveyard was soon needed. The result was Boothill Cemetery, so named because most of those interred were said to have died with their boots on. One notable burial in Coulson's Boothill Cemetery is H.M. "Muggins" Taylor, the scout who carried the news of Custer's Last Stand at the Battle of Little Bighorn to the world. Today, Boothill Cemetery is the only remaining physical evidence of Coulson's existence.

When the railroad came to the area, Coulson residents were sure the town would become the railroads hub and Coulson would soon be the territory's largest city. The railroad only had claim to odd sections and it had two sections side-by-side about two miles west of Coulson. Being able to make far more profit by creating a new town on these two sections, the railroad decided to create the new town of Billings. For a short time, the two towns existed side by side with a horse-drawn trolley running between them. However, most of Coulson's residents gradually moved to the new booming town of Billings. The last remains of Coulson disappearing in the 1930s. Today, Coulson Park—along the Yellowstone River—marks the site of the former town.

=== Early railroad town ===
Named after the Northern Pacific Railway president Frederick H. Billings, the city was founded in 1882. The Railroad formed the city as a western railhead for its further westward expansion. At first the new town had only three buildings, but within just a few months, it had grown to over 2,000. This spurred Billings's nickname of the Magic City because, like magic, it seemed to appear overnight.

Billings's original townsite flanked the Northern Pacific Railroad line. The street layout was based on Bismarck and Jamestown, North Dakota. Uniquely, Billings was designed with two main commercial streets along each side of the railroad: Montana Avenue on the north, and Minnesota Avenue to the south. The streets were named after the Minnesota & Montana Land Improvement Company, which plotted the townsite. The original railroad depot, on Montana Avenue at 28th St. (Broadway), spurred early business development along with north side of the tracks.

Street parade on Montana Avenue, late 1880s

During the fledgling town's first year of existence, the institutions required to support a permanent settlement were quickly established. Billings became home to two newspapers: the Post (formerly published in Coulson) and the Herald. The Congregational church began holding services in early spring, and soon after, built a temporary building on land donated by the townsite company. A post office was established in Billings in July, and school classes began in September. After Yellowstone County was divided from Custer County that winter—with Billings named the county seat—the newly formed School District 2 was formalized in June 1883. Frederick and Julia Billings donated much of the funding for a permanent school building. They also provided funding for a brick edifice for the Congregational church.

Despite the markers of organized society, Billings retained some of the colorful character of a frontier town. On July 13, 1891, a mob hung an unidentified man who had been arrested for the murder of well-liked barkeeper Joseph Clancy, who owned a bar on Minnesota Avenue. This was the only lynching in the city's history. A few years later, Minnesota Avenue earned a reputation as Billings's red-light district, with prostitutes operating out of high-end "parlor houses." Other prostitutes operated out of lower-end "cribs" or engaged in streetwalking. Olive Warren, who moved to Billings in 1897 after working in the Denver red-light district, opened the Lucky Diamond—the finest brothel in Montana—in 1902. Minnesota Avenue also anchored a small Chinese district. This included the L and L Building, owned by entrepreneur Yee Sam Lee and occupied for a short time by Calamity Jane.

=== 20th century ===
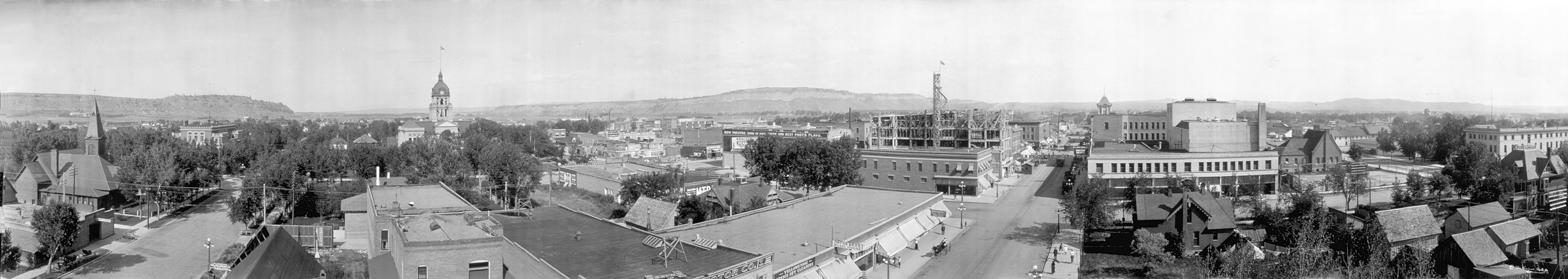
Panoramic view of downtown Billings, 1915, looking east and south from the intersection of North 28th Street (extending away in the photo's right half) and 3rd Avenue North (extending away in the photo's left half). Visible landmarks include First Congregational Church (far left), the Electric Building (center, under construction), and the Babcock Theatre (right).

In the early 1900s, business activity on the north side of the track was booming. The Billings Depot was rebuilt four blocks east of the original depot site in 1909, prompting the construction of new hotels, eateries, and saloons along Montana Avenue to serve railroad passengers. Downtown was expanding to the north as well, along North Broadway, with buildings such as the old City Hall and the Babcock Theatre. The lots adjoining the railroad were largely occupied by wholesale warehouses, making Billings an important regional distribution hub. These included two entire South Side blocks occupied by the Yegen Brothers' wholesale grocery business.

A sugar beet factory was established in Billings in 1906. Immigrants from countries including Japan, Mexico, and Germany were employed as laborers and lived with their families near the factory on Billings's South Side. The local Mexican community was celebrating an annual fiesta as early as the 1930s. Some of the German families later relocated east of Billings to farm land irrigated by the Huntley Project.

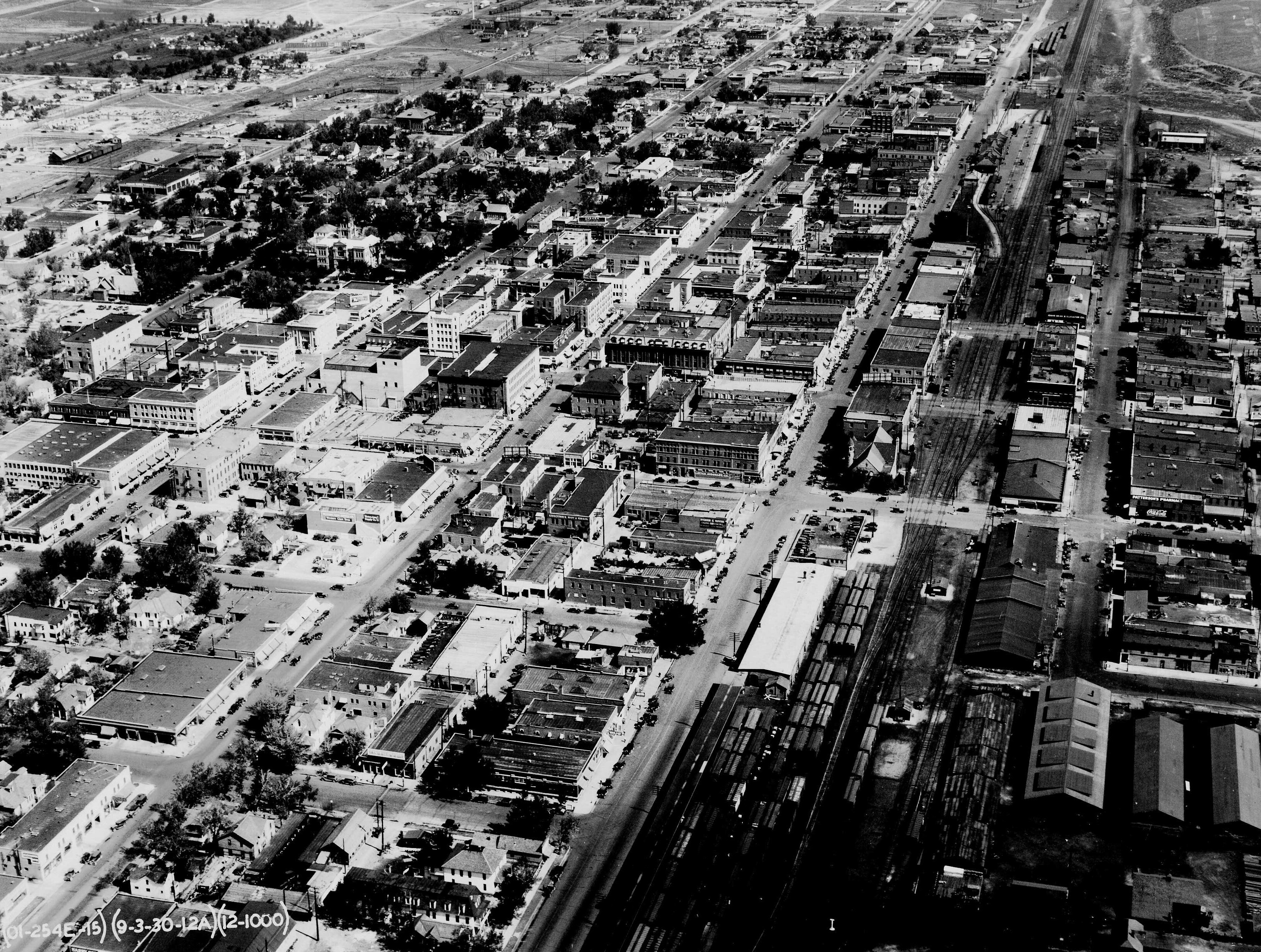
Aerial view of Downtown Billings, 1930

By the 1910 census, Billings's population had risen to 10,031, ranking it the sixth fastest-growing community in the nation. Billings became an energy center in the early years of the twentieth century with the discovery of oil fields in Montana and Wyoming. Then, the discovery of large natural gas and coal reserves secured the city's rank as first in energy. Billings developed into the regional trading center and energy hub for eastern Montana and northern Wyoming, an area then known as the Midland Empire.

After World War II, Billings became the region's major financial, medical and cultural center. Largely because of the energy sector, the city's growth remained robust. After oil was discovered in the Williston Basin in 1951, Billings became a hub for related economic activity, with several companies building regional division offices in the city. Though the boom ended by the end of the decade, Billings had grown by 66 percent. Later, the 1973 oil embargo by OPEC spurred an oil boom in eastern Montana, northern Wyoming and western North Dakota. With this increase in oil production, Billings became the headquarters for energy sector companies. Then, between 1975 and 1986, Billings benefited from four new coal-fire generation plants at Colstrip.

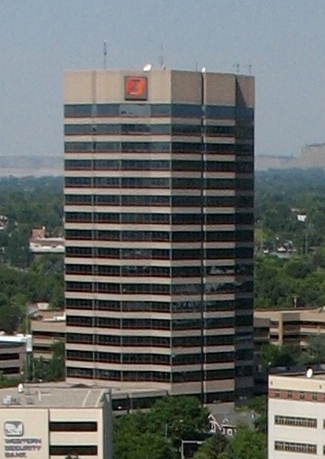
Built in 1985 and standing at 272 feet (83 m), First Interstate Center is the tallest building in Montana.

In the 1970s and 1980s, Billings saw major growth in its downtown core; the first high-rise buildings to be built in Montana were erected. In 1980, the 22-floor Sheraton Hotel was completed. Upon its completion, it was declared "the tallest load-bearing brick masonry building in the world" by the Brick Institute of America. During the 1970s and 1980s, other major buildings were constructed in the downtown core; the Norwest Building (now Wells Fargo), Granite Tower, Sage Tower, the MetraPark Arena, the TransWestern Center, many new city-owned parking garages, and the First Interstate Center, the tallest building in Montana.

With the completion of large sections of the interstate system in Montana in the 1970s, Billings became a shopping destination for an ever-larger area. Rimrock Mall opened in 1975, on what was then the city's west end. Cross Roads Food Center, the largest supermarket in Montana, opened in 1976 in the Billings Heights and gradually expanded into Crossroads Mall. West Park Plaza opened in Midtown. Several new business parks were also developed on the city's west end during this period.

Billings was affected by the 1980 eruption of Mount St. Helens in May; the city received about 1-inch (25 mm) of ash on the ground. The Yellowstone fires of 1988 blanketed Billings in smoke for weeks.

In the 1990s, the service sector in the city increased with the development of new shopping centers built around big box stores which built multiple outlets in the Billings area. With the addition of more interchange exits along I-90, additional hotel chains and service industry outlets are being built in Billings. Development of business parks and large residential developments on the city's west end, South Hills area, Lockwood, and the Billings Heights were all part of the 1990s. Billings received the All-America City Award in 1992.

=== 21st century ===
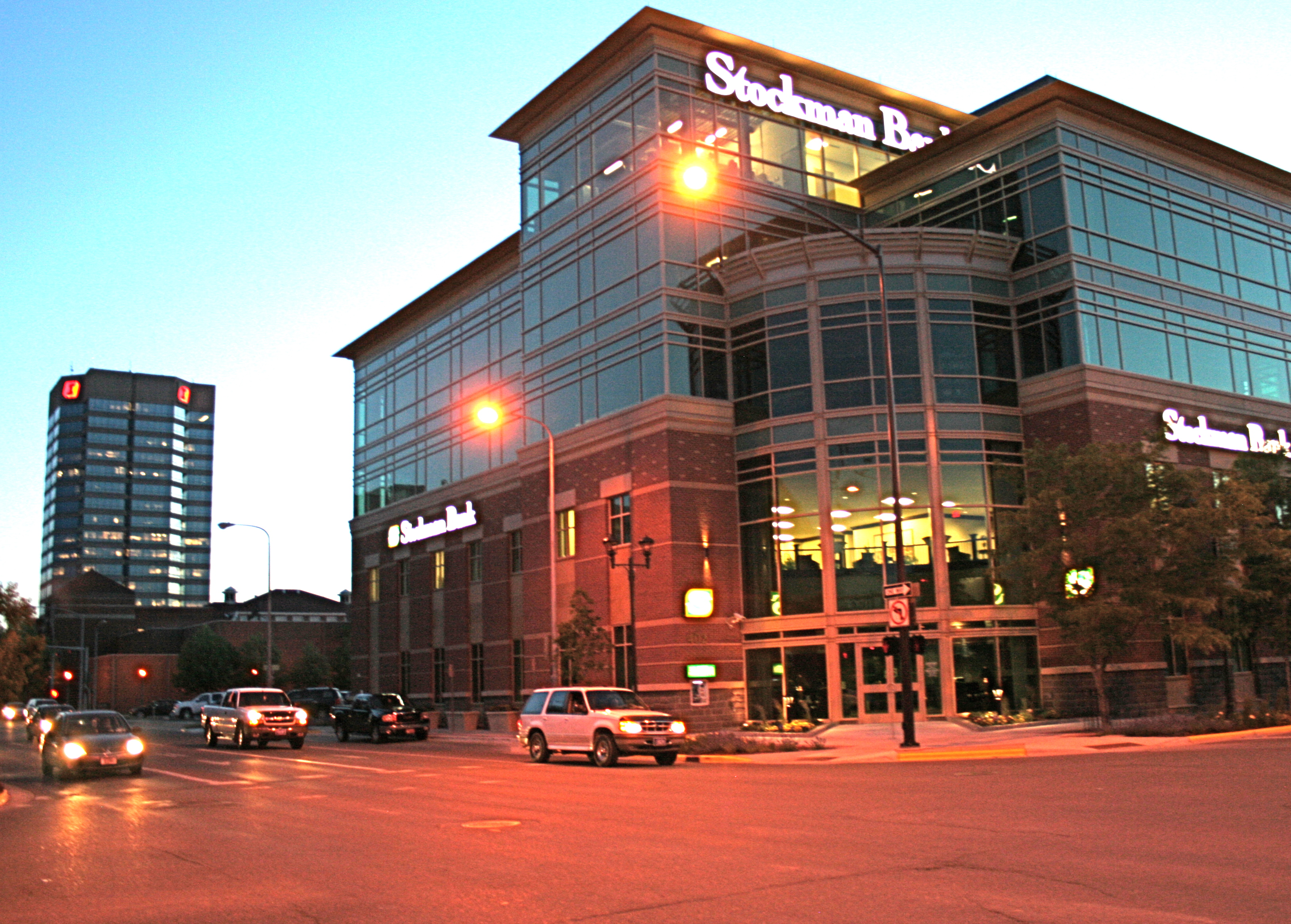
Intersection of 4th Ave. N., and N. 28th St. downtown

In the 21st century, Billings saw the development of operations centers in the city's business parks and downtown core by such national companies as GE, Wells Fargo, and First Interstate Bank. Downtown saw a renaissance of the historic area as building after building was restored, and Skypoint was completed in 2002, providing a defining area to host events. In 2006 Crossroads Mall was demolished. In 2007, Billings was designated a Preserve America Community.

Billings avoided the economic downturn and housing bubble that affected most of the nation from 2008 to 2012. Eastern Montana and North Dakota experienced an energy boom due to the Bakken formation, the largest oil discovery in U.S. history. The boom stimulated the Billings economy, and during the same period, the city experienced healthy growth in the agricultural and healthcare sectors. With the completion of the Shiloh interchange exit, the TransTech Center was developed and more hotels were built. In 2010 the Shiloh corridor was open for business with the completion of the Shiloh parkway, a 4.8-mile (7.7 km) multi-lane street with eight roundabouts.

On June 20, 2010 (Father's Day), a tornado touched down in the downtown core and Heights sections of Billings. The MetraPark Arena and area businesses suffered major damage.

During the COVID-19 pandemic, Billings did not experience the same rapid growth or housing supply issues as Bozeman or Missoula. However, the city did steadily grow at a rate of 2% to 3% per year during the early 2020s. Billings's urban core, like many downtowns across the United States, suffered from increased office vacancies. However, it was simultaneously transformed through major projects like the renovation of the former federal courthouse into the current Billings City Hall, the construction of a replacement hospital by Intermountain Health, and renewed retail activity in the historic district.

In 2022, Billings received LEED Gold certification, the first city to do so in Montana and the 21st globally. Projects to achieve this status included increased efficiency at the water and wastewater treatment plant, adding electric city buses and EV charging stations, and creating the Shiloh Conservation Area on the West End.

Continued growth required new infrastructure, such as the Billings Bypass—an arterial roadway connecting Lockwood to the Heights over the Yellowstone River. On the other side of the Heights, the long-planned Skyway Drive beltway opened in 2023, creating development opportunities to the north and west of the airport. Construction began in 2025 on the new West End Water Treatment Plant, which will include two reservoirs fed by the Billings Bench Water Association Canal.

== Geography ==
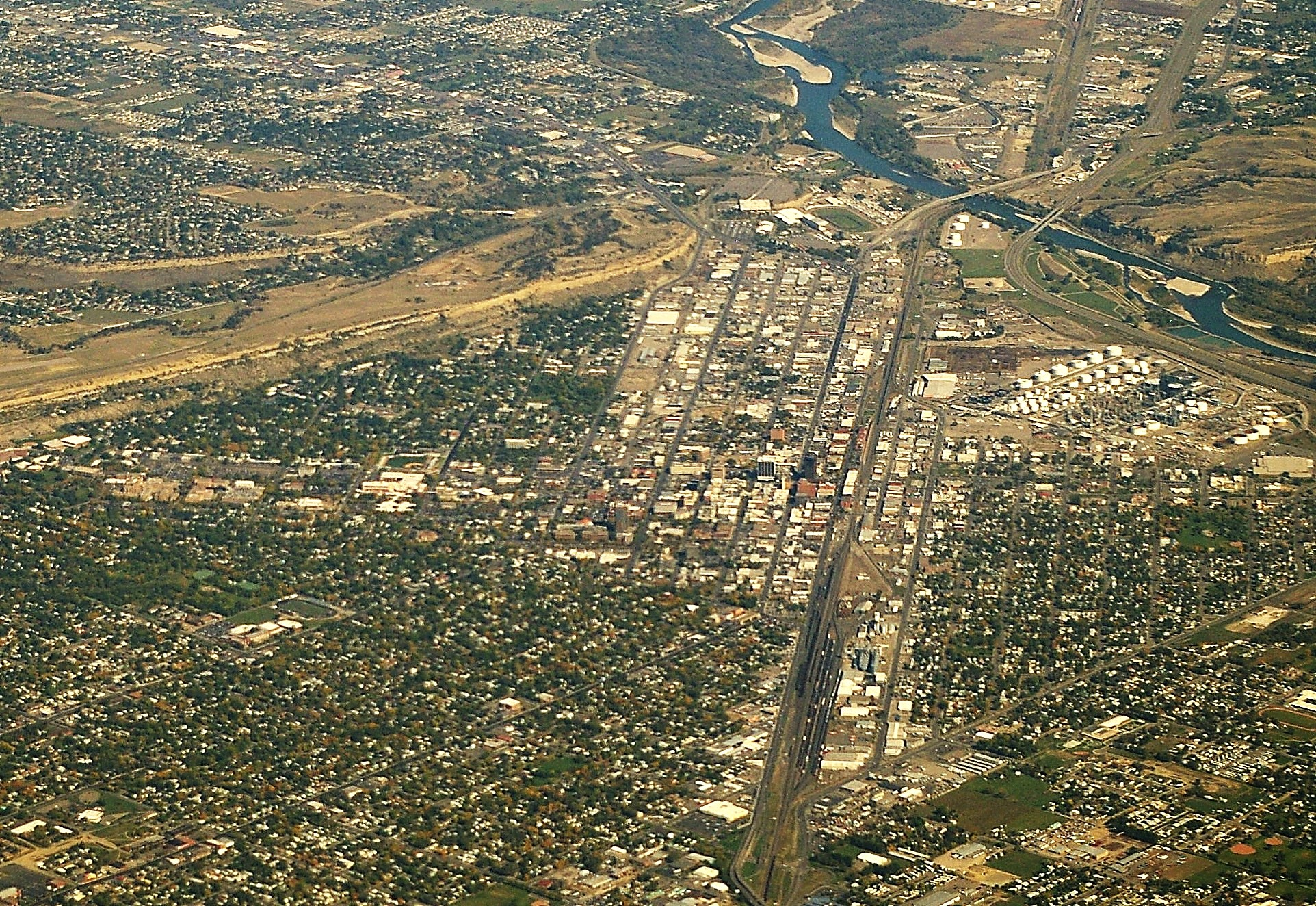
The Rims border the northern and eastern edges of the downtown core.

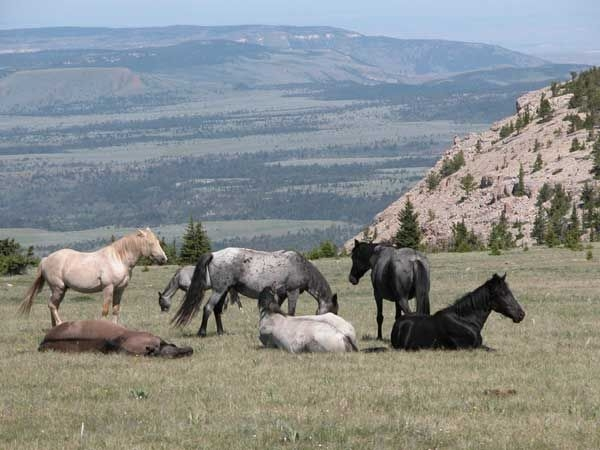
Feral horses - Pryor Mountain Wild Horse Range - Montana

Two-thirds of the city is in the Yellowstone Valley and the South Hills area and one-third in the Heights-Lockwood area. The city is divided by the Rims, long cliffs, also called the Rimrocks. The Rims run to the north and east of the downtown core, separating it from the Heights to the north and Lockwood to the east, with the cliffs to the north being 500 feet (150 m) tall and to the east of downtown, the face rises 800 feet (240 m). The elevation of Billings is 3,126 feet (953 m) above sea level. The Yellowstone River runs through the southeast portion of the city. According to the United States Census Bureau, the city has an area of 43.52 square miles (112.72 km^{2}), of which 43.41 square miles (112.43 km^{2}) is land and 0.11 square miles (0.28 km^{2}) is water.

Around Billings, seven mountain ranges can be viewed. The Bighorn Mountains have over 200 lakes and two peaks that rise to over 13,000 feet (4,000 m): Cloud Peak, at 13,167 ft (4,013 m) and Black Tooth Mountain, at 13,005 ft (3,964 m). The Pryor Mountains directly south of Billings rise to a height of 8,822 feet (2,689 m) and are unlike any other landscape in Montana. They are also home the Pryor Mountain Wild Horse Range. The Beartooth Mountains are the location of Granite Peak, which at 12,807 feet (3,904 m) is the highest point in the state of Montana. The Beartooth Highway, a series of steep zigzags and switchbacks along the Montana–Wyoming border, rises to 10,947 feet (3,337 m). It was called "the most beautiful drive in America" by Charles Kuralt. The Beartooth Mountains are just northeast of Yellowstone National Park. The Crazy Mountains to the west rise to a height of 11,209 feet (3,417 m) at Crazy Peak, the tallest peak in the range. Big Snowy Mountains, with peaks of 8,600 feet (2,600 m), are home to Crystal Lake. The Bull Mountains are a low-lying heavily forested range north of Billings Heights. The Absaroka Range stretches about 150 mi (240 km) across the Montana–Wyoming border, and 75 miles (121 km) at its widest, forming the eastern boundary of Yellowstone National Park.

=== Climate ===
Climate chart for Billings

Downtown Billings has a cold semi-arid climate (Köppen: BSk) bordering humid continental climate at the Water Treatment Plant (Köppen: Dfa) even when using the 27 °F (−3 °C) isotherm or at either weather station if using the 32 °F (0 °C) isotherm, with dry, hot summers, and cold, dry winters. However, Billings Logan International Airport borders on an extremely marginal humid subtropical climate (Koppen: Cfa) when using the 27 °F (−3 °C) isotherm. In the summer, the temperature can rise to over 100 °F (37.8 °C) on an average of 1 to 3 days per year, while the winter will bring temperatures below 0 °F or −17.8 °C on an average of 12.9 days per year. The snowfall averages 57.4 inches (146 cm) a year, but because of warm chinook winds that pass through the region during the winter, snow does not usually accumulate heavily or remain on the ground for long: the greatest depth has been 33 inches (84 cm) on April 5, 1955, after a huge storm which dumped 4.22 inches (107 mm) of water equivalent precipitation as snow in the previous three days under temperatures averaging 26.7 °F (−2.9 °C).

The snowiest year on record was 2017–18, with 106.1 inches (269 cm), topping the 2013–14 previous record of 103.5 inches (263 cm). The first freeze of the season on average arrives by October 6 and the last is May 5. Spring and autumn in Billings are usually mild, but brief. Winds, while strong at times, are considered light compared with the rest of Montana and the Rocky Mountain Front.

On June 20, 2010, a tornado touched down in the Billings Heights and Downtown sections of the city. The tornado was accompanied by hail up to golf ball size, dangerous cloud-to-ground lightning, and heavy winds. The tornado destroyed a number of businesses and severely damaged the 12,000-seat MetraPark Arena.

Climate data for Billings, Montana (Billings Logan International Airport), 1991–2020 normals, extremes 1934–present
Month	Jan	Feb	Mar	Apr	May	Jun	Jul	Aug	Sep	Oct	Nov	Dec	Year
Record high °F (°C)	68 (20)	72 (22)	83 (28)	90 (32)	96 (36)	105 (41)	111 (44)	105 (41)	103 (39)	91 (33)	77 (25)	73 (23)	111 (44)
Mean maximum °F (°C)	56.3 (13.5)	59.7 (15.4)	70.1 (21.2)	79.0 (26.1)	85.8 (29.9)	94.1 (34.5)	99.9 (37.7)	98.4 (36.9)	93.0 (33.9)	81.3 (27.4)	67.3 (19.6)	56.2 (13.4)	101.1 (38.4)
Mean daily maximum °F (°C)	36.0 (2.2)	39.2 (4.0)	49.0 (9.4)	56.9 (13.8)	66.9 (19.4)	77.0 (25.0)	87.3 (30.7)	85.8 (29.9)	74.3 (23.5)	58.8 (14.9)	45.7 (7.6)	36.1 (2.3)	59.4 (15.2)
Daily mean °F (°C)	27.0 (−2.8)	29.4 (−1.4)	38.0 (3.3)	45.8 (7.7)	55.3 (12.9)	64.7 (18.2)	73.3 (22.9)	71.6 (22.0)	61.4 (16.3)	47.9 (8.8)	36.2 (2.3)	27.6 (−2.4)	48.2 (9.0)
Mean daily minimum °F (°C)	17.9 (−7.8)	19.7 (−6.8)	26.9 (−2.8)	34.7 (1.5)	43.8 (6.6)	52.4 (11.3)	59.3 (15.2)	57.5 (14.2)	48.6 (9.2)	37.1 (2.8)	26.7 (−2.9)	19.2 (−7.1)	37.0 (2.8)
Mean minimum °F (°C)	−7.4 (−21.9)	−2.3 (−19.1)	5.9 (−14.5)	20.9 (−6.2)	30.6 (−0.8)	41.3 (5.2)	50.6 (10.3)	46.5 (8.1)	35.1 (1.7)	18.4 (−7.6)	4.5 (−15.3)	−4.0 (−20.0)	−15.7 (−26.5)
Record low °F (°C)	−30 (−34)	−38 (−39)	−21 (−29)	−5 (−21)	14 (−10)	32 (0)	41 (5)	35 (2)	22 (−6)	−7 (−22)	−22 (−30)	−32 (−36)	−38 (−39)
Average precipitation inches (mm)	0.55 (14)	0.57 (14)	0.90 (23)	1.72 (44)	2.36 (60)	2.22 (56)	1.22 (31)	0.87 (22)	1.36 (35)	1.37 (35)	0.60 (15)	0.57 (14)	14.31 (363)
Average snowfall inches (cm)	10.6 (27)	9.1 (23)	8.2 (21)	7.5 (19)	0.9 (2.3)	0.0 (0.0)	0.0 (0.0)	0.0 (0.0)	0.3 (0.76)	4.5 (11)	6.5 (17)	9.8 (25)	57.4 (146)
Average extreme snow depth inches (cm)	6.5 (17)	4.9 (12)	5.0 (13)	2.3 (5.8)	0.3 (0.76)	0.0 (0.0)	0.0 (0.0)	0.0 (0.0)	0.2 (0.51)	2.3 (5.8)	3.6 (9.1)	5.7 (14)	10.1 (26)
Average precipitation days (≥ 0.01 in)	6.6	6.9	8.6	10.4	12.2	11.2	7.7	6.0	6.8	8.2	6.1	6.2	56.9
Average snowy days (≥ 0.1 in)	6.8	7.0	6.4	4.2	0.8	0.0	0.0	0.0	0.2	2.5	4.4	6.5	38.8
Average relative humidity (%)	60.2	59.3	58.2	53.8	54.9	53.3	45.6	44.5	51.6	52.7	59.4	60.9	54.5
Average dew point °F (°C)	9.9 (−12.3)	14.7 (−9.6)	19.8 (−6.8)	26.8 (−2.9)	36.3 (2.4)	44.6 (7.0)	47.1 (8.4)	44.6 (7.0)	38.1 (3.4)	29.7 (−1.3)	20.1 (−6.6)	12.4 (−10.9)	28.7 (−1.8)
Mean monthly sunshine hours	130.2	156.6	236.5	255.5	282.0	304.7	355.4	329.0	255.8	203.2	127.6	116.4	2,752.9
Percentage possible sunshine	46	54	64	63	61	65	75	75	68	60	45	43	62
Source 1: NOAA (relative humidity, dew points and sun 1961–1990)
Source 2: National Weather Service

Climate data for Billings Water Treatment Plant, 1991–2020 normals, extremes 1894–present
Month	Jan	Feb	Mar	Apr	May	Jun	Jul	Aug	Sep	Oct	Nov	Dec	Year
Record high °F (°C)	75 (24)	76 (24)	82 (28)	92 (33)	99 (37)	108 (42)	112 (44)	107 (42)	101 (38)	95 (35)	80 (27)	75 (24)	112 (44)
Mean maximum °F (°C)	57.4 (14.1)	61.4 (16.3)	72.1 (22.3)	80.8 (27.1)	86.4 (30.2)	94.4 (34.7)	99.4 (37.4)	98.5 (36.9)	94.3 (34.6)	83.2 (28.4)	69.0 (20.6)	57.7 (14.3)	100.5 (38.1)
Mean daily maximum °F (°C)	36.5 (2.5)	40.6 (4.8)	50.9 (10.5)	58.6 (14.8)	67.6 (19.8)	76.9 (24.9)	86.3 (30.2)	85.4 (29.7)	75.2 (24.0)	60.4 (15.8)	46.5 (8.1)	36.8 (2.7)	60.1 (15.6)
Daily mean °F (°C)	25.4 (−3.7)	29.0 (−1.7)	37.8 (3.2)	45.8 (7.7)	54.7 (12.6)	63.7 (17.6)	71.2 (21.8)	69.6 (20.9)	60.1 (15.6)	47.3 (8.5)	35.1 (1.7)	26.3 (−3.2)	47.2 (8.4)
Mean daily minimum °F (°C)	14.4 (−9.8)	17.3 (−8.2)	24.7 (−4.1)	33.1 (0.6)	41.9 (5.5)	50.4 (10.2)	56.2 (13.4)	53.7 (12.1)	45.0 (7.2)	34.3 (1.3)	23.7 (−4.6)	15.8 (−9.0)	34.2 (1.2)
Mean minimum °F (°C)	−11.2 (−24.0)	−4.1 (−20.1)	4.8 (−15.1)	20.3 (−6.5)	30.2 (−1.0)	39.5 (4.2)	48.2 (9.0)	44.7 (7.1)	33.4 (0.8)	17.9 (−7.8)	3.1 (−16.1)	−6.3 (−21.3)	−18.8 (−28.2)
Record low °F (°C)	−39 (−39)	−49 (−45)	−34 (−37)	−5 (−21)	14 (−10)	26 (−3)	37 (3)	28 (−2)	18 (−8)	−11 (−24)	−28 (−33)	−41 (−41)	−49 (−45)
Average precipitation inches (mm)	0.56 (14)	0.57 (14)	0.97 (25)	1.88 (48)	2.47 (63)	2.45 (62)	1.31 (33)	0.80 (20)	1.52 (39)	1.60 (41)	0.68 (17)	0.62 (16)	15.43 (392)
Average snowfall inches (cm)	7.5 (19)	4.7 (12)	4.9 (12)	3.2 (8.1)	0.1 (0.25)	0.0 (0.0)	0.0 (0.0)	0.0 (0.0)	0.0 (0.0)	1.7 (4.3)	3.1 (7.9)	9.8 (25)	35.0 (89)
Average precipitation days (≥ 0.01 in)	5.0	4.8	5.7	8.9	10.7	10.4	6.9	5.1	6.3	7.3	5.6	4.5	81.2
Average snowy days (≥ 0.1 in)	3.5	3.2	1.9	1.3	0.1	0.0	0.0	0.0	0.0	1.0	1.8	3.9	18.7
Source 1: NOAA
Source 2: National Weather Service

=== Neighborhoods and sections ===
Billings has 10 sections within its city limits, most of which have their own designated neighborhood task forces.

The South Side is one of the oldest residential areas in the city, and it is the city's most culturally diverse neighborhood. Its South Park is an old-growth City park, host to several food fairs and festivals in the summer months. Clark Avenue in the Terry–Central Park neighborhood is home to many of Billings's first mansions. Midtown, the most densely populated portion of the city is in the midst of gentrification on a level few, if any, areas in Montana have ever seen. New growth is mainly concentrated on Billings's West End, where Shiloh Crossing is a new commercial development, anchored by Scheels, Montana's largest retail store. Residentially, the West End is characterized by upper income households. Denser, more urban growth is occurring in the Southwest Corridor's Josephine Crossing, one of Billings's many new contemporary neighborhoods. Downtown is a blend of small businesses and office space, together with restaurants and a walkable brewery district. The Heights, defined as the area of the city northeast of the Metra, is predominantly residential, and a new school was completed in 2016 to accommodate growth in the neighborhood. The Rimrocks ("Rims") separate the Heights from Downtown.

=== Tallest buildings ===
The tallest building in Billings and Montana is the First Interstate Center, which stands at 272 feet (83 m) and 20 floors above ground level. The second-tallest building in Billings is the DoubleTree Hotel, which stands at 256 feet (78 m). The building has been called the tallest load-bearing brick structure in the world; however, the Guinness World Records awards that title to Chicago's Monadnock Building. The Wells Fargo Building, formerly the Norwest Bank Building, was the tallest building in Montana from 1977 until 1980.

The new facility for St. Vincent Regional Hospital, which is currently under construction, will stand at 285 feet (87 m) when completed in 2029.

=== Surrounding areas ===
Billings is the principal city of the Billings Metropolitan Statistical Area. The metropolitan area consists of three counties: Yellowstone, Stillwater, and Carbon. The population of the entire metropolitan area was at 184,167 in the 2020 Census.

== Demographics ==
Historical population
Census	Pop.	Note	%±
1870	145		—
1880	587		304.8%
1890	836		42.4%
1900	3,211		284.1%
1910	10,031		212.4%
1920	15,100		50.5%
1930	16,386		8.5%
1940	23,216		41.7%
1950	31,834		37.1%
1960	52,851		66.0%
1970	61,581		16.5%
1980	66,798		8.5%
1990	81,151		21.5%
2000	89,847		10.7%
2010	104,170		15.9%
2020	117,116		12.4%
U.S. Decennial Census; 2020 Census

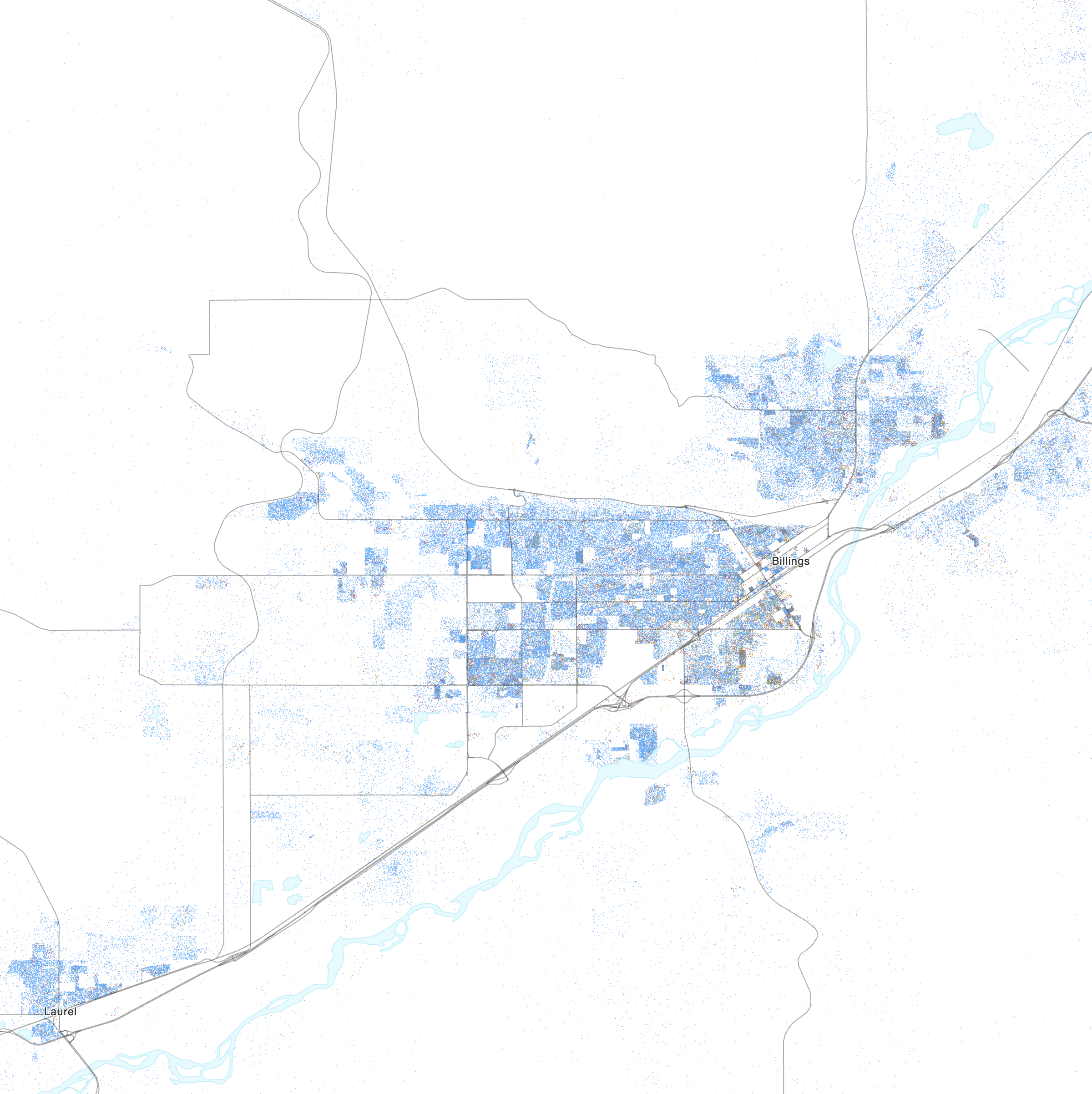
Map of racial distribution in Billings, 2020 U.S. census. Each dot is one person: ⬤ White ⬤ Black ⬤ Asian ⬤ Hispanic ⬤ Multiracial ⬤ Native American/Other

=== 2020 census ===
Billings, Montana – Racial and ethnic composition Note: the US Census treats Hispanic/Latino as an ethnic category. This table excludes Latinos from the racial categories and assigns them to a separate category. Hispanics/Latinos may be of any race.
Race / Ethnicity (NH = Non-Hispanic)	Pop 2000	Pop 2010	Pop 2020	% 2000	% 2010	% 2020
White alone (NH)	80,770	90,503	95,214	89.90%	86.88%	81.30%
Black or African American alone (NH)	466	750	1,039	0.52%	0.72%	0.89%
Native American or Alaska Native alone (NH)	2,860	4,204	5,227	3.18%	4.04%	4.46%
Asian alone (NH)	516	755	1,057	0.57%	0.72%	0.90%
Pacific Islander alone (NH)	35	84	187	0.04%	0.08%	0.16%
Other race alone (NH)	44	61	421	0.05%	0.06%	0.36%
Mixed race or Multiracial (NH)	1,398	2,357	6,034	1.56%	2.26%	5.15%
Hispanic or Latino (any race)	3,758	5,456	7,937	4.18%	5.24%	6.78%
Total	89,847	104,170	117,116	100.00%	100.00%	100.00%

=== 2010 census ===
As of the census of 2010, there were 104,170 people, 43,945 households, and 26,194 families residing in the city. The population density was 2,399.7 inhabitants per square mile (926.5/km^{2}). There were 46,317 housing units at an average density of 1,067.0 per square mile (412.0/km^{2}). The racial makeup of the city was 89.6% White, 4.4% Native American, 0.8% Black, 0.7% Asian, 0.1% Pacific Islander, 1.4% from other races, and 2.9% from two or more races. Hispanic or Latino of any race were 5.2% of the population.

There were 43,945 households, of which 28.9% had children under the age of 18 living with them, 43.7% were married couples living together, 11.3% had a female householder with no husband present, 4.6% had a male householder with no wife present, and 40.4% were non-families. 32.6% of all households were made up of individuals, and 12% had someone living alone who was 65 years of age or older. The average household size was 2.29 and the average family size was 2.90.

In the city, the population was spread out, with 22.6% of residents under the age of 18; 9.8% between the ages of 18 and 24; 26.3% from 25 to 44; 26.3% from 45 to 64; and 15% who were 65 years of age or older. The median age in the city was 37.5 years. The gender makeup of the city was 48.3% male and 51.7% female.

=== Income ===
As of 2000 the median income for a household in the city was $35,147, and the median income for a family was $45,032. The per capita income for the city was $19,207. As of 2021, the median household income had risen to $63,608, slightly higher than the statewide median income of $60,560. Per capita income was $37,976. About 9.2% of families and 11.1% of the population were below the poverty line, including 16.5% of those under age 18 and 7.0% of those age 65 or over. 36.6% of the population has a bachelor's degree or higher.

== Economy ==
Billings's future as a major trade and distribution center was basically assured from its founding due to its geographic location. As Billings quickly became the region's economic hub, it outgrew the other cities in the region. The Billings trade area serves over a half million people. Because Montana has no sales tax, Billings is a retail destination for much of Wyoming as well as much of Montana east of the Continental Divide. $1 out of every $7 spent on retail purchases in Montana is spent in Billings. The percentage of wholesale business transactions done in Billings is even stronger: Billings accounts for more than a quarter of the wholesale business for the entire state (these figures do not include Billings portion of sales for Wyoming and the Dakotas).

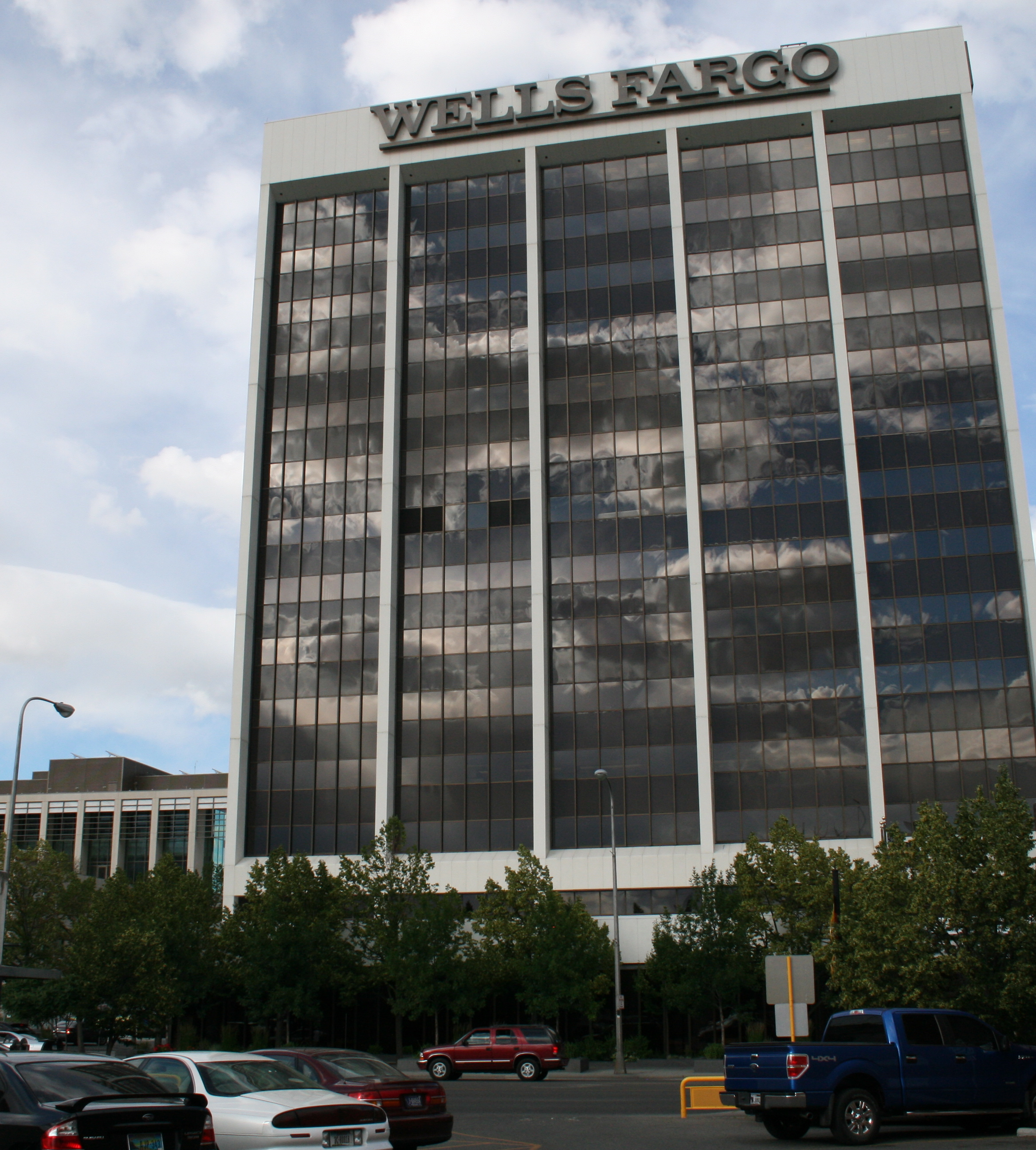
Wells Fargo Center

The largest employment sector in Billings is healthcare and social assistance. The two hospitals anchoring Billing's growing medical corridor are Billings Clinic (One Sky Health), which employs 4,500 people, and St. Vincent Regional Hospital (Intermountain Health), which employs 2,200 people. Further healthcare facilities include dozens of clinics, RiverStone Health, and Advanced Care Hospital of Montana, a long-term care hospital operated by Ernest Health. St. John's United, with multiple campuses in Billings, provides services such as senior living, elder care, outpatient therapy, and hospice care.

Billings contributes to Montana's agricultural economy with the Western Sugar Cooperative Plant, processing multi-million dollar crops of sugar beets each year. Other crops include alfalfa, wheat, barley, and corn. Billings has two livestock auction locations out of the 13 statewide. Several farm and ranch supply stores are located in Billings, providing for the large retail radius the city serves.

Billings is an energy center because it sits amidst the largest coal reserves in the United States, as well as large oil and natural gas fields. Out of Montana's four oil refineries, the largest three are in Yellowstone County. Montana has about three-tenths of the nation's estimated recoverable coal reserves.

Kampgrounds of America and First Interstate Bank are headquartered in Billings. The Montana Women's Prison, with a capacity of 250, is the state's largest facility for female incarcerees. The city has manufacturing facilities for Coca-Cola, Franz Bakery, and Meadow Gold.

== Arts and culture ==
=== Attractions ===
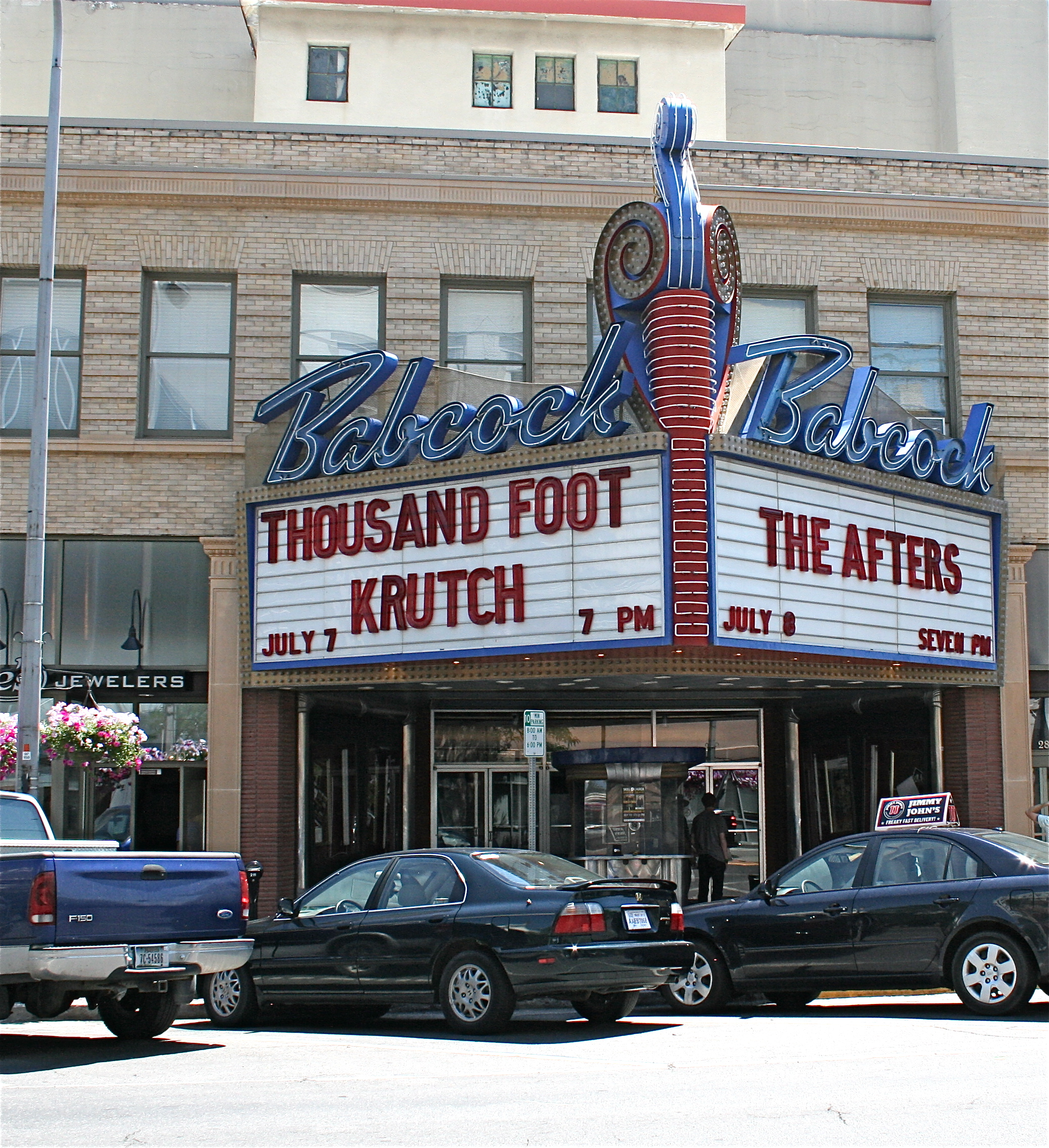
The historic Babcock Theatre

Museums in Billings are concentrated in and around downtown. The Moss Mansion is a historic house museum built in 1913 by influential businessman P. B. Moss. The Western Heritage Center, housed in the former public library, creates exhibits and programming to tell the stories of historical people and places. The Yellowstone Art Museum spotlights contemporary art. The Yellowstone County Museum, on the grounds of the Billings Logan International Airport, includes a steam engine and log cabin. The Wise Wonders Science and Discovery Museum engages children and families with an interactive learning environment. East of Billings in Osborn is the Huntley Project Museum, dedicated to the communities impacted by the 1907 Huntley Project.

Historic landmarks inside the city include the Billings Depot, Boothill Cemetery, and Yellowstone Kelly's grave. Billings is near Pompey's Pillar, Pictograph Cave, Chief Plenty Coups State Park, and the Little Bighorn Battlefield.

=== Libraries ===
Billings Public Library serves Billings and Yellowstone County. It was founded in 1901 in honor of Parmly Billings. The current downtown facility opened in 2014.

=== Zoos ===
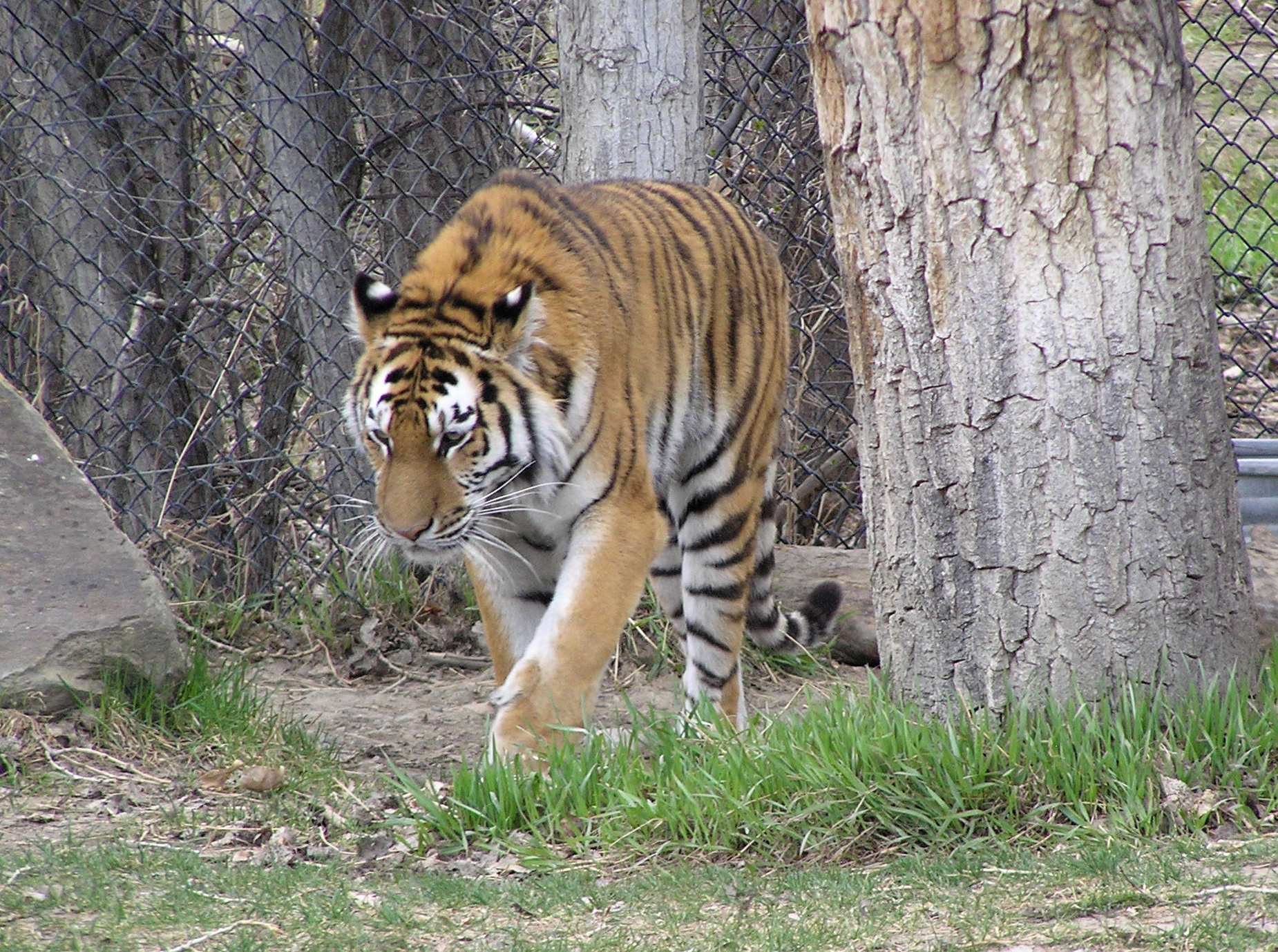
Siberian tiger at ZooMontana

ZooMontana is a 70-acre (28 ha) zoo and botanical garden on the West End. It is the only accredited zoo in the state.

=== Music ===
Recurring music events include Alive After 5—a downtown concert series—and Julia Louis Dreyfest, a punk rock festival highlighting musicians from across the Mountain West. Billings's music scene has traditionally included punk and garage rock, and the Magic City Blues Festival was held in Billings for 22 years (2002–2023). Venues for the local music scene include Pub Station, Kirks' Grocery, and Craft Local.

The Billings Symphony, established in 1951, includes an orchestra, chorale, and youth orchestra. The Billings Symphony presents a regular annual season that includes a summer concert at Pioneer Park. Other concert acts include the Yellowstone Chamber Players and Billings Community Band.

Major touring acts commonly perform at First Interstate Arena at MetraPark.

=== Theatre ===
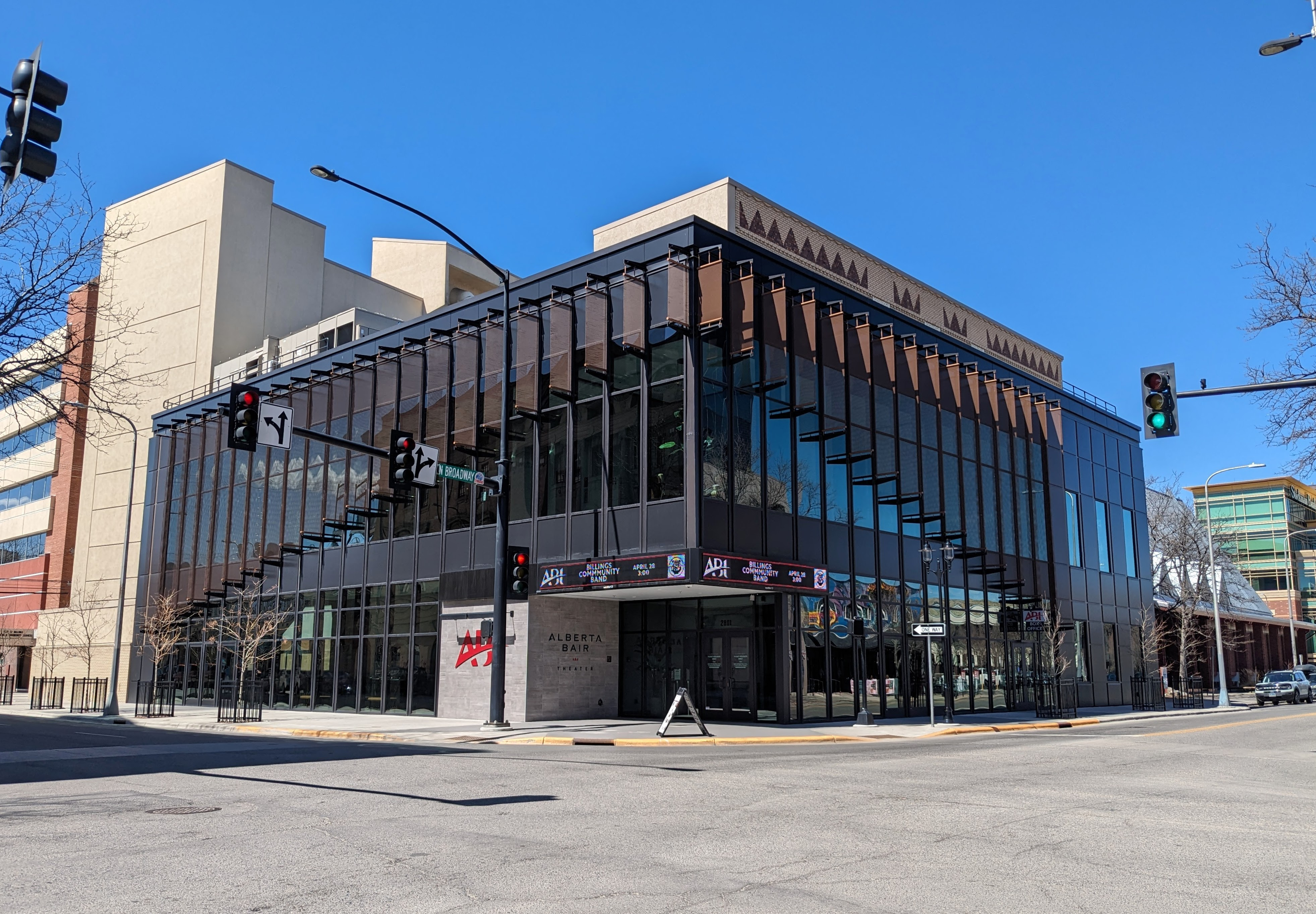
Alberta Bair Theater

Touring theatre shows typically play at the Alberta Bair Theater, a 1,400-seat performing arts venue noted for its 20-ton capacity hydraulic lift that raises and lowers the stage apron. Local theatre, including plays and musicals, is provided by NOVA Center for the Performing Arts and Billings Studio Theater. Local production organizations include Yellowstone Repertory Theatre and Backyard Theatre.

=== Events ===
Event	Occurrence	Location
St. Patrick's Day Parade	March	Downtown
Montana Renaissance Festival	June	MetraPark
Billings Pride	June	Downtown
Strawberry Festival	July	Downtown
Big Sky Balloon Rally	July	Amend Park
MontanaFair	August	MetraPark
Julia Louis Dreyfest	August	Downtown
Billings Artwalk	First Friday of every other month	Downtown

=== Breweries and distilleries ===
With nine microbreweries in the metropolitan area, Billings has more breweries than any community in Montana. The downtown breweries include Montana Brewing Co., Thirsty Street Tap Room, Angry Hank's Tap Room, Carters Brewery, and Überbrew. Downtown Billings is also home to two distilleries, offering a variety of handcrafted spirits and cocktails. The West End is the location of several other breweries and a third distillery. The Billings Brew Trail features all of the distilleries and breweries across the city, as well as a cider house and a winery.

== Sports ==
The Billings Mustangs are an independent Pioneer League baseball team. The team plays home games at Dehler Park. Baseball in Billings dates back almost to the city's founding, with a city team formed in 1883. Prior to the Mustangs, a local team called the Young Democrats was active for several decades. The Mustangs were founded in 1948 by Bob Cobb, namesake of the former Cobb Field. Dehler Park replaced Cobb Field in 2008.

The Billings Cattle Punchers are a Tier II junior ice hockey team in the North American Hockey League, set to begin in the 2026–27 season. The team will play at Signal Peak Energy Arena. The arena is also home to Billings Amateur Hockey League, which was founded in the mid-1970s and previously played at Centennial Ice Arena.

Annual sporting events include the Big Sky State Games and the Northern International Livestock Exposition (NILE) Rodeo. The Great American Hill Climb, a motorcycle race, has been held since 1918.

== Parks and recreation ==
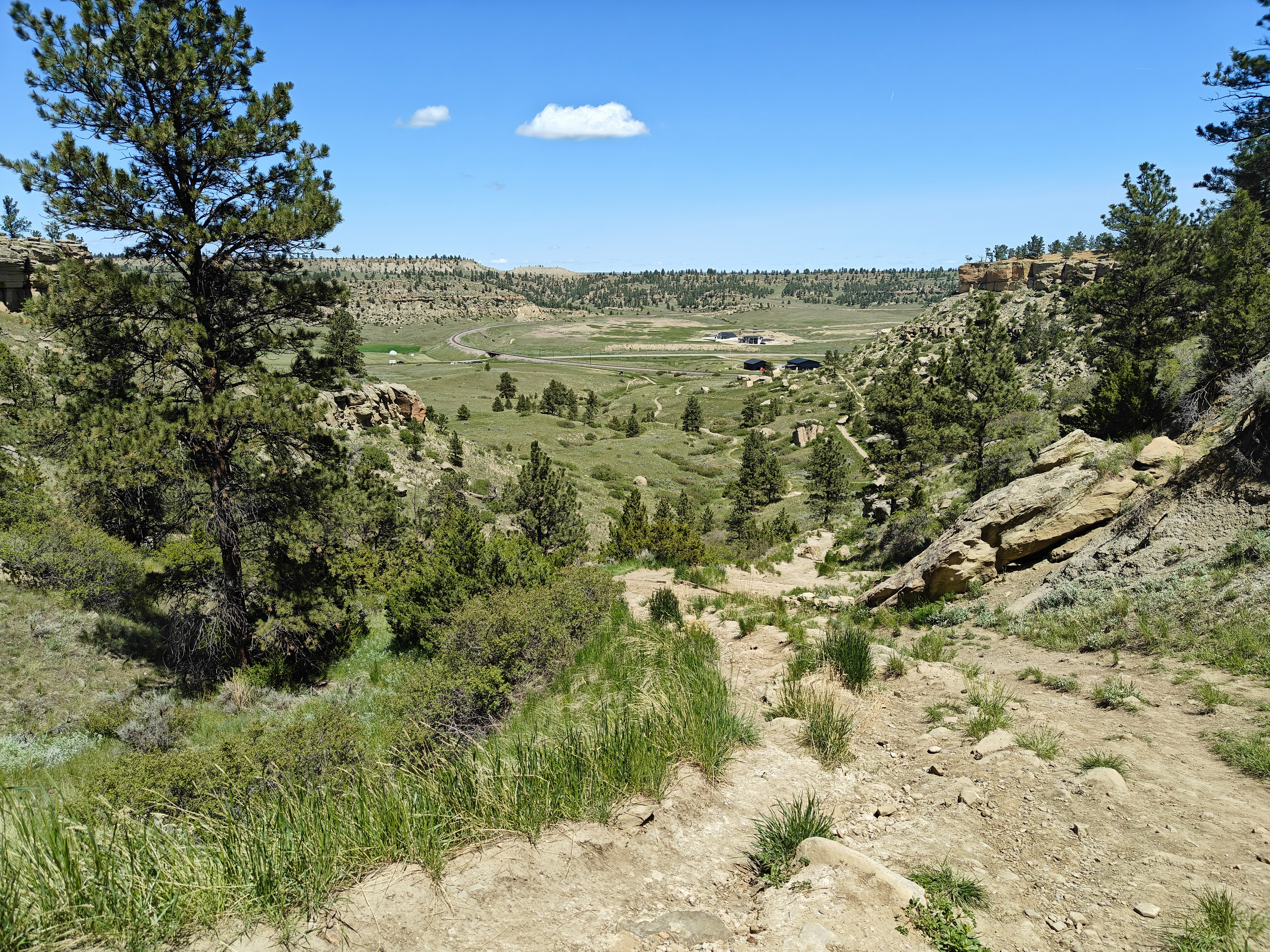
Phipps Park (Diamond X)

Within Billings, there are approximately 3,000 acres (1,200 ha) of parkland and natural areas available for public recreation. Parkland is largely concentrated along the Rimrocks, including Four Dances Natural Area, Zimmerman Park, and Swords Park; and the Yellowstone River corridor, including Riverfront Park, Two Moon Park, and Coulson Park. Billings has approximately 90 playgrounds, 65 basketball courts, and 35 tennis courts in total. Specialized facilities include the Downtown Skate Park, four disc golf courses, and two dog parks. The city operates swimming pools in Rose Park and South Park. Some other neighborhood parks have spray grounds or wading ponds.

Neighborhood parks are more common near the urban core than in the West End or the Heights. The oldest neighborhood parks are North Park, which once served as a fairgrounds, and South Park, which anchors the historic South Side. Pioneer Park, known for its wooded grounds and winding walkways, was dedicated in 1932 and is listed on the National Register of Historic Places.

Lake Elmo State Park provides public access to a 64-acre (26 ha) reservoir in the Billings Heights.

== Government ==
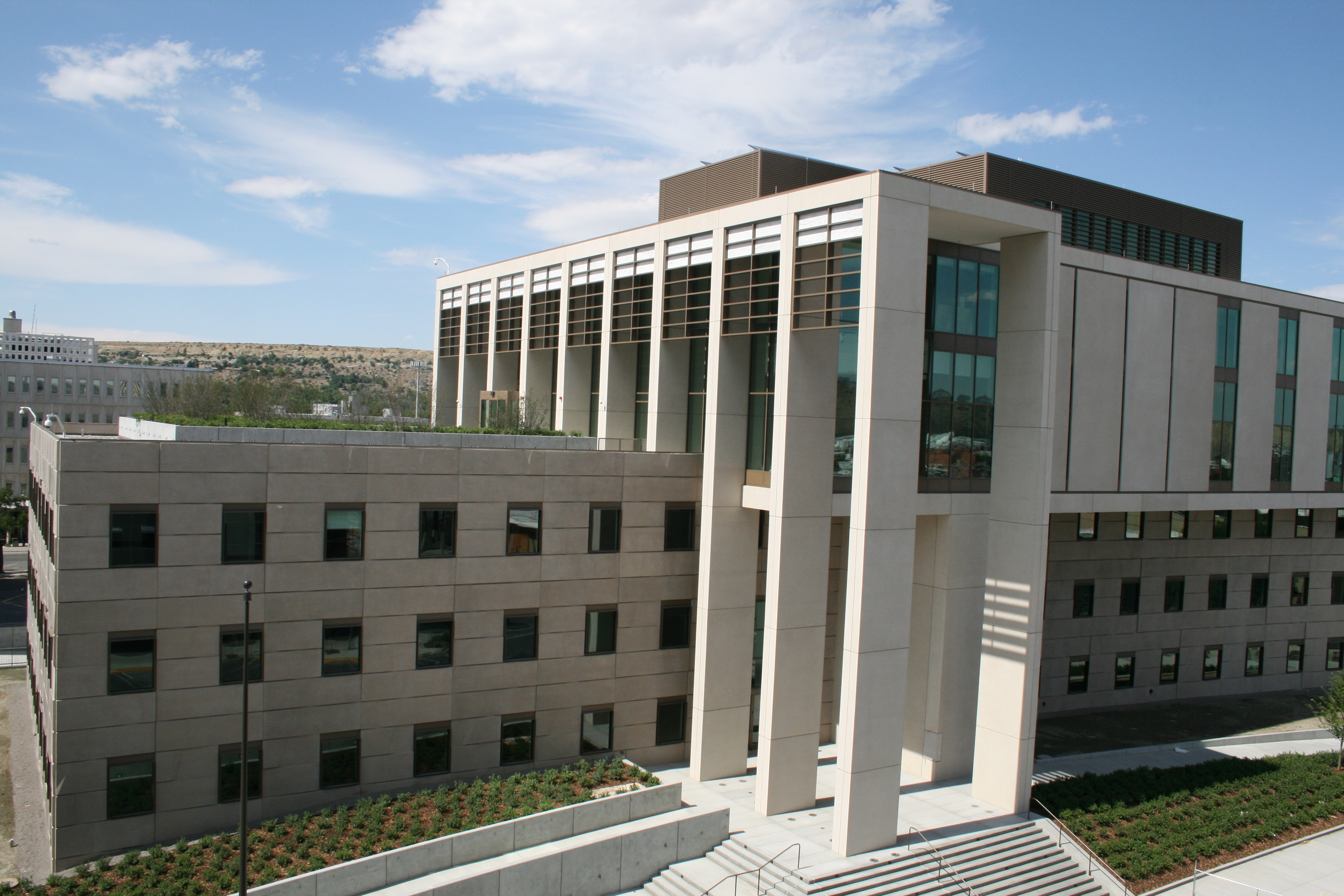
James F. Battin Federal Courthouse

Billings is the county seat of Yellowstone County, the most populous county in Montana. It is also the location of the James F. Battin Federal Courthouse, one of five federal courthouses for the District of Montana.

Billings is governed via the mayor council system. There are ten members of the city council who are elected from one of five wards with each ward electing two members. The mayor is elected in a citywide vote. Both the mayor and council members are officially nonpartisan. The city charter, also called the Billings, Montana City Code (BMCC) was established 1977. The mayor is Mike Nelson.

Unlike some other cities in Montana, Billings's city ordinances do not contain provisions that forbid discrimination on the basis of sexual orientation or gender identity. An effort to pass a non-discrimination ordinance in Billings failed in 2014, after then-mayor Tom Hanel cast a tie-breaking vote against it at the conclusion of a meeting that lasted 8.5 hours. An effort to introduce an NDO measure to the City Council was briefly floated in September 2019, but was abandoned approximately a month later. Another vote to consider a non-discrimination ordinance failed in February 2020.

== Education ==
=== Primary and secondary ===
==== Public ====
Billings Public Schools includes both the Billings Elementary School District and Billings High School District. Billings Public Schools has 21 elementary schools, six middle schools, and three high schools (Senior High, Skyview High, and West High) that have approximately 16,000 students and 1,800 full-time employees. Other elementary school districts in Yellowstone County that cover parts of Billings are Blue Creek, Elder Grove, Canyon Creek, Elysian, and Independent.

==== Private ====
Billings Catholic Schools is a private Roman Catholic school district that operates Billings Central Catholic High School (grades 9–12), St. Francis Catholic School (grades K–8), and the Early Childhood Education Center preschool. Billings Catholic Schools has around 1,000 students and 100 teachers.

Other private schools include the non-denominational Billings Christian School (grades Pre–12) and Grace Montessori Academy (grades Pre–8). The Lutheran Church – Missouri Synod operates two schools: Mount Olive Lutheran (grades Pre–8) and Trinity Lutheran (grades Pre–8).

=== Colleges and universities ===
==== Montana State University Billings ====
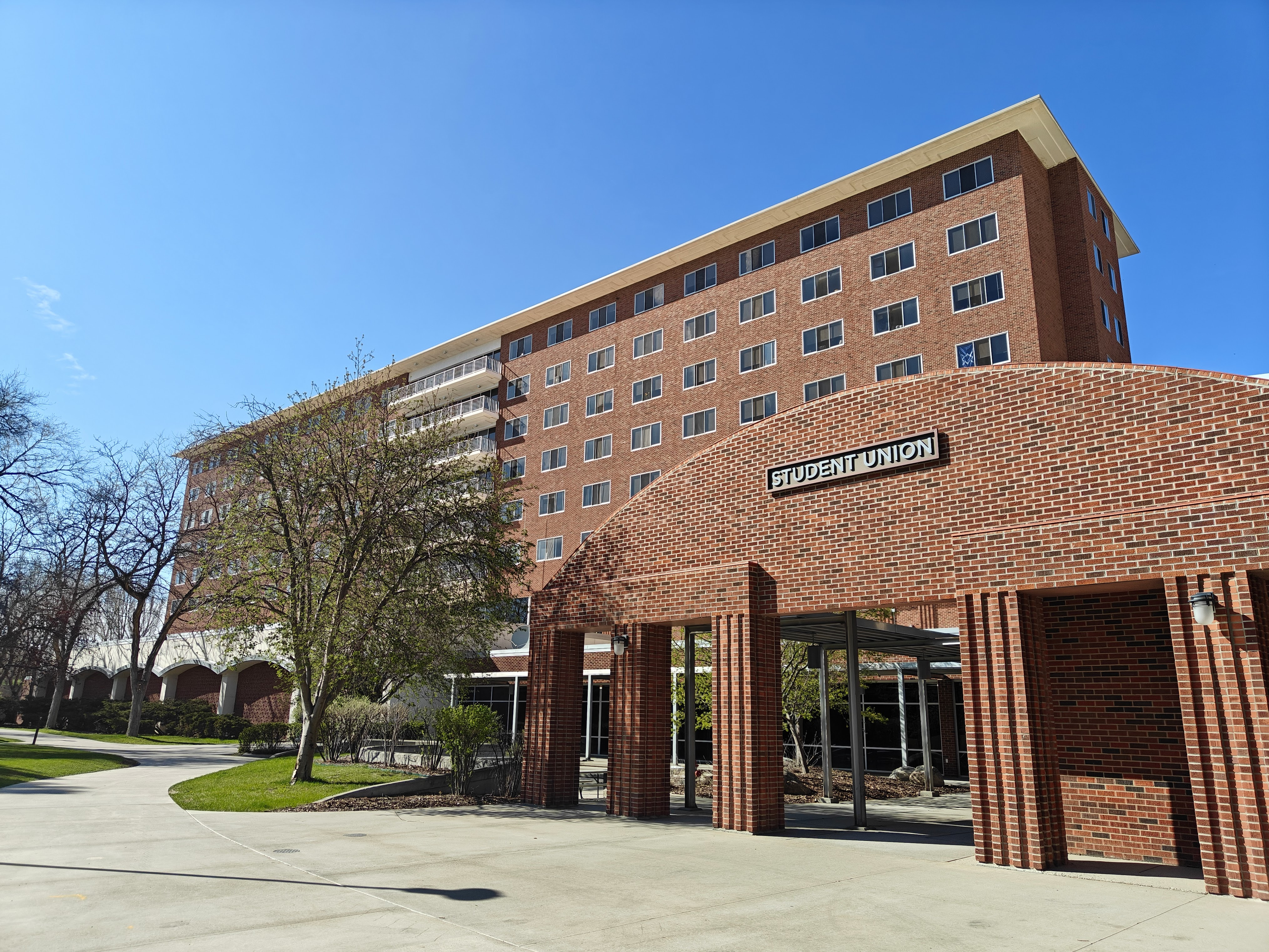
Petro Hall at Montana State University Billings

Montana State University Billings is a public university affiliated with the Montana University System. It offers associate/bachelor's/master's degrees and certificates in fields such as business, education, and medicine. Around 4,100 students attend MSU Billings. The institution was founded in 1927 as a normal school, and was known as Eastern Montana College from 1949 to 1994.

City College at MSU Billings is the "comprehensive two-year college arm" of MSU Billings. The college offers degrees and programs in fields including automotive, business, computer technology, and nursing. It was established in 1969 as the Billings Vocational-Technical Education Center, and merged with MSU Billings (Eastern Montana College) in 1994.

==== Rocky Mountain College ====
Rocky Mountain College is a private institution that offers majors in fields including art, education, music, psychology, and theater. Around 1,000 students attend the institution. RMC is affiliated with the United Church of Christ, the United Methodist Church, and the Presbyterian Church (U.S.A.). Through the marriage of three earlier entities, Rocky Mountain College is Montana's oldest institution of higher learning. The campus that became RMC was known as the Billings Polytechnic Institute until 1947, when it joined the Montana Collegiate Institute in Deer Lodge (Montana's first institution of higher learning) and Intermountain Union College in Helena to form Rocky Mountain College.

==== Rocky Vista University ====
Rocky Vista University, a private for-profit school of osteopathic medicine, operates the Montana College of Osteopathic Medicine on the West End. Classes began in 2023. The university plans to establish a College of Veterinary Medicine at the Billings campus by 2026.

==== Other college and universities ====
Montana Bible College is a small, private, religious institution that offers undergraduate degrees. Around 40 students attend the college.

Other institutions that maintain a Billings presence include Walla Walla University, the University of Mary, and the Montana State University College of Nursing. Yellowstone Christian College was headquartered in Billings from 1974 to 2021, when it moved to Kalispell.

== Media ==
=== Newspapers ===
The largest media market in Montana and Wyoming, Billings is serviced by a variety of print media. Newspaper service includes the Billings Gazette, a daily morning broadsheet newspaper owned by Lee Enterprises. It is the largest daily newspaper in Montana.

Yellowstone County News is the next leading print newspaper, owned by Jonathan & Tana McNiven. It is published on a weekly basis and provides news and columns for "Yellowstone County and the communities of Lockwood, Shepherd, Huntley, Worden, Ballanatine, Pompey's Pillar, Custer and Billings." It is also recognized as the Publication of Record for both the City of Billings and Yellowstone County.

=== Magazines ===
Billings has several community magazines including Simply Local Magazine and Yellowstone Valley Woman.

=== Television and radio ===
The Billings area has four major non-news television stations, two major news television stations, one community television station, four PBS channels and several Low-Power Television (LPTV) channels. The major TV stations include KTVQ channel 2 (CBS affiliate and part of the Montana Television Network [MTN]), KHMT channel 4 (FOX affiliate), KSVI channel 6 (ABC affiliate with The CW on DT2), KULR-TV channel 8 (NBC affiliate) and PBS member station KBGS-TV on channel 16.

It is also served by twenty-two commercial radio stations, Yellowstone Public Radio (NPR), and a Low-Power (LP) radio station. KFHW-LP is a radio station at 101.1 FM in Billings, an extension of the Yellowstone County News, also known as "YCN Radio" and/or "YCN Sports & Radio."

== Infrastructure ==
=== Transportation ===
==== Airports ====
Billings Logan International Airport is close to downtown; it sits on top of the Rims, a 500-foot (150 m) cliff that overlooks the downtown core. Scheduled passenger service and air cargo flights operate from this airfield.

The Laurel Municipal Airport is a publicly owned public-use airport in Laurel, Montana, eleven miles (18 km) southwest of downtown Billings. It has three runways exclusively serving privately operated general aviation aircraft and helicopters.

==== Public transportation ====
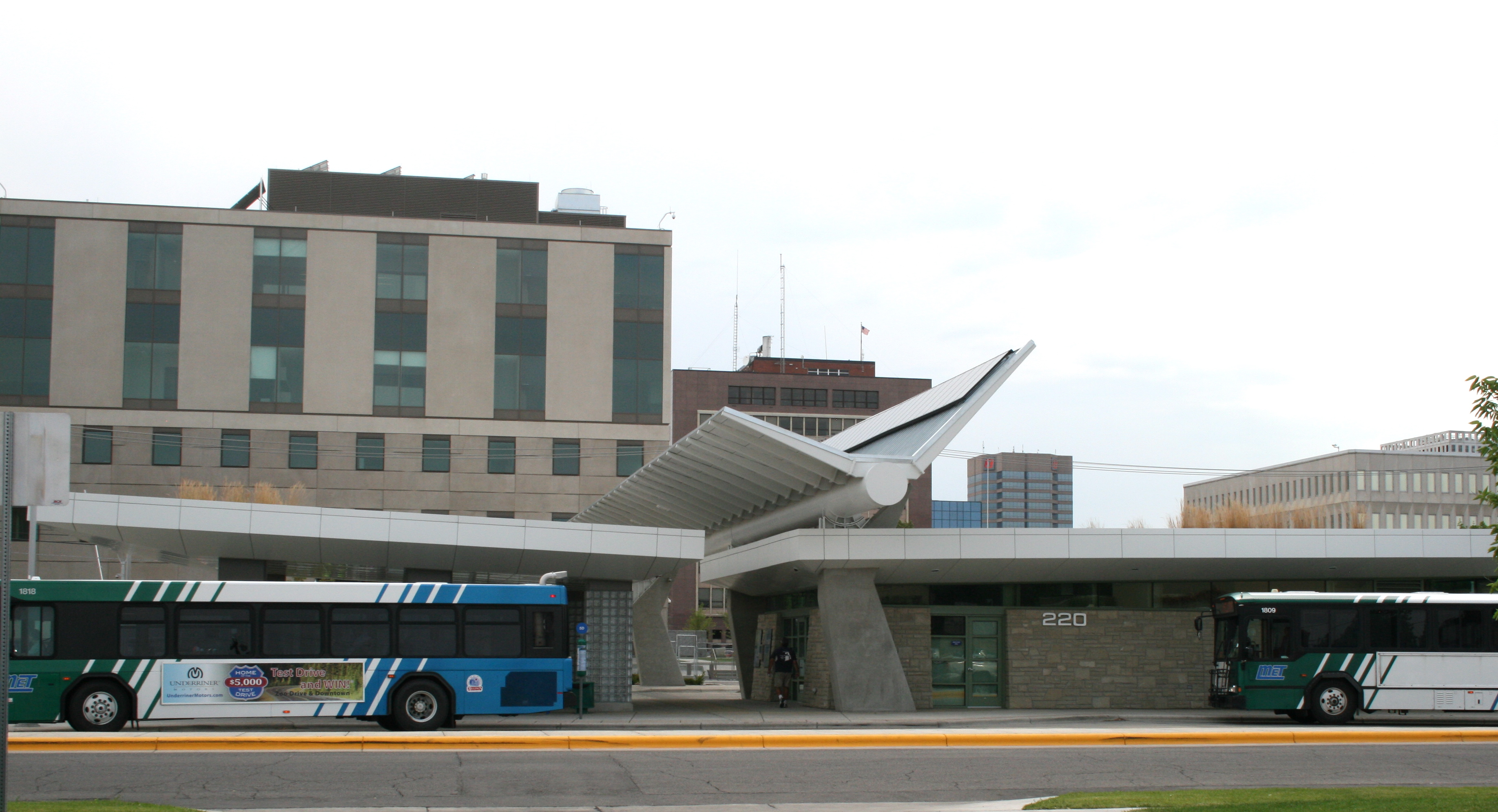
Downtown MET transit center

The Billings METropolitan Transit is Billings's public transit system. MET Transit provides fixed-route and paratransit bus service to the City of Billings. All MET buses are accessible by citizens who use wheelchairs and other mobility devices. They are wheelchair lift-equipped and accessible to all citizens who are unable to use the stairs. MET buses are equipped with bike racks for their bike-riding passengers. There are Westend and Downtown transit centers allowing passengers to connect with all routes. The Billings Bus Terminal is served by Express Arrow, Greyhound, and Jefferson Lines, which also provide regional and interstate bus service.

==== Trail system ====
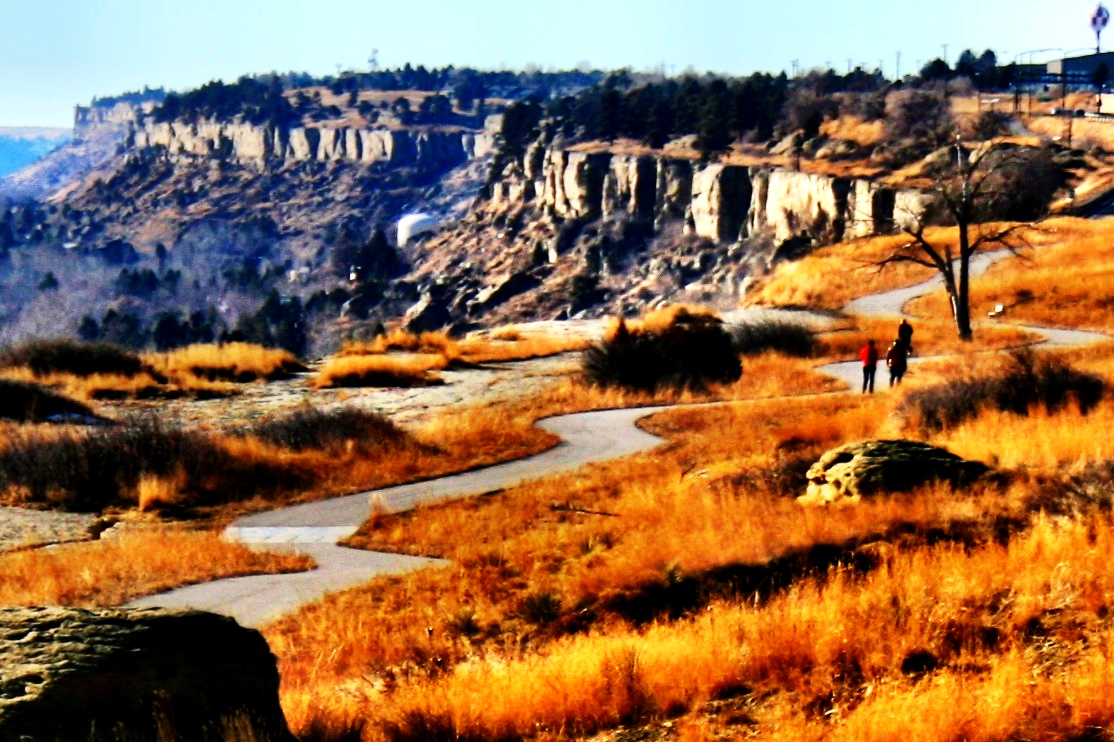
Swords Park Trail

Billings has over 50 miles of trails running in and around the city. This includes approximately seven continuous miles of trails along the top of the Rimrocks.

==== Highways ====
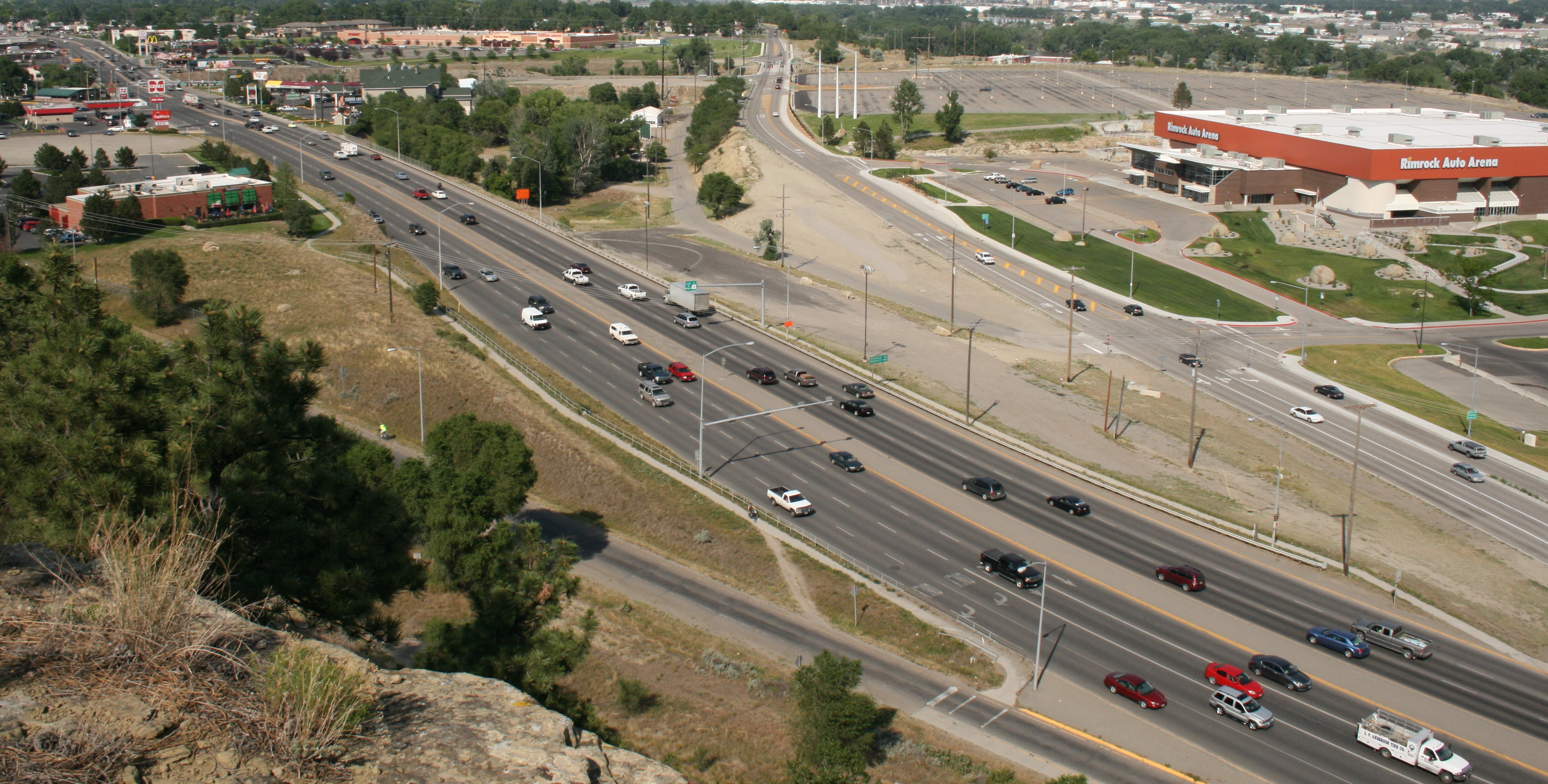
US-87 in Billings Heights

Interstate 90 runs east–west through the southern portion of Billings, serving as a corridor between Billings Heights, Lockwood, Downtown, South Hills, Westend, Shiloh, and Laurel. East of Downtown, between Billings Heights and Lockwood, Interstate 90 connects with Interstate 94, which serves as an east–west corridor between Shepherd, Huntley, Lockwood, Downtown, South Hills, Westend, Shiloh, and Laurel via its connection with I-90.

Montana Highway 3 is a north–south highway that runs along the edge of the North Rims connecting Downtown and the West End with the Rehberg Ranch, Indian Cliffs, and Billings Heights. U.S. Highway 87 runs through the center of Billings Heights and is known as Main Street within the city limits. This is the busiest section of roadway in the state of Montana. It connects to U.S. Highway 87 East, which runs through Lockwood as Old Hardin Road.

The Billings Bypass will create a new and more direct connection between the Billings Heights and Lockwood by connecting I-90 with Montana Highway 87 and Old Highway 312. The project will include a new bridge over the Yellowstone River (completed in 2023) and the reconstruction of the I-90 Johnson Lane Interchange.

==== Rail ====
There is currently no service, though until 1979 Amtrak's North Coast Hiawatha stopped at the Billings Depot, serving a Chicago to Seattle route. Before Amtrak, Billings was well-served by Northern Pacific, Great Northern, and Chicago, Burlington, and Quincy railroads with direct routes to Kansas City, Denver, Chicago, Great Falls, and the West Coast. (Billings was the northern and western terminus for the Chicago, Burlington and Quincy Railroad).

The Big Sky Passenger Rail Authority was formed in 2020 to advocate for restoring Amtrak's North Coast Hiawatha route. In 2023, the organization was awarded $500,000 by the Corridor Identification and Development Program to explore the proposal's logistics and feasibility. The North Coast Hiawatha received further recognition from its identification in the 2024 Amtrak Daily Long-Distance Service Study.

=== Water infrastructure ===
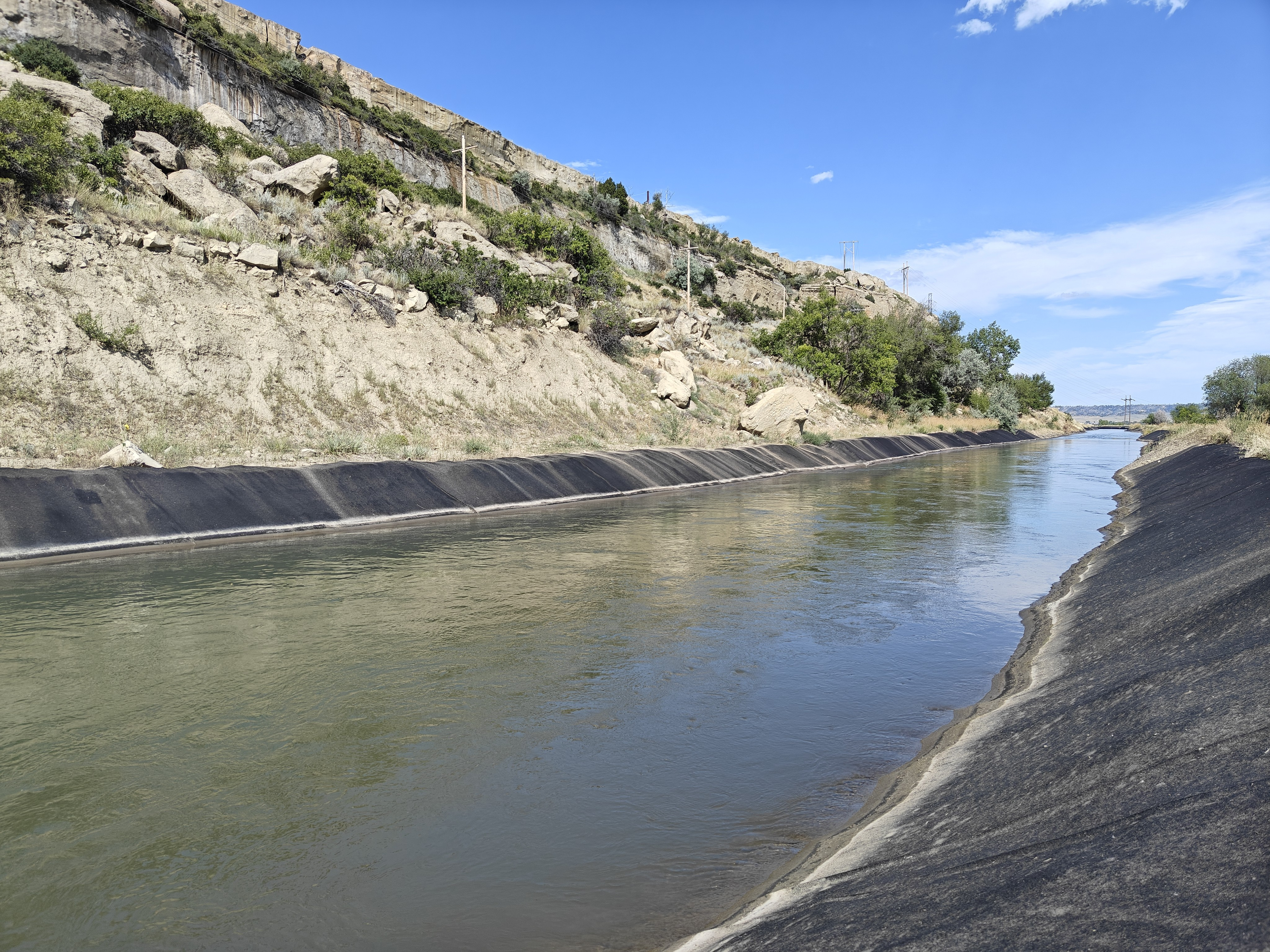
A portion of the Billings Bench Water Association Canal alongside the Rimrocks

Six different irrigation canals divert water from the Yellowstone River into Billings. The canals are controlled by private ditch companies. These include the Big Ditch, Canyon Creek Ditch, Cove Ditch, and High Ditch, which serve the city and the agricultural land to the west. The Billings Bench Water Association Canal extends the furthest, running through the city and to the east. The irrigation canals were all built between 1881 and 1910; the oldest is the Big Ditch (M&M Canal), built to attract farmers to the area when the city was founded.

A separate series of open canals and pipes serve as drains, discharging runoff and stormwater into the Yellowstone River. Some of these are natural streams that have been highly modified. Major drains include Hogan's Slough, the City/County Drain, the Yegen Drain, and Alkali Creek.

Billings's treated water supply is distributed from the Belknap Water Treatment Plant on the Yellowstone River. The plant feeds the city's 13 pump stations and 18 storage reservoirs. It also feeds 7 pump stations and 3 reservoirs owned by the County Water District of Billings Heights, which purchases and distributes city water to a portion of the Heights neighborhood. A second water treatment plant on the West End, fed by the Billings Bench Water Association Canal, is slated for completion in late 2026.

=== Healthcare ===
The city has two hospitals with Level I Trauma Center status: St. Vincent Regional Hospital and Billings Clinic. Other medical facilities include the Northern Rockies Radiation Oncology Center, Rimrock Foundation (addiction treatment both inpatient and outpatient), Advanced Care Hospital of Montana (a 40-bed long-term acute-care hospital), South Central Montana Mental Health Center, Billings VA Community-Based Outpatient Clinic, RiverStone Health, HealthSouth Surgery Center and Physical Therapy offices, Baxter/Travenol BioLife plasma collection center, and many independent practices.

==== St. Vincent Regional Hospital ====
St. Vincent Regional Hospital was founded in 1898 by the Sisters of Charity of Leavenworth as St. Vincent Hospital. The name was changed to the present name in 2024. In 2011, the hospital and its 30 clinics employed approximately 2,100 people and received more than 400,000 patient visits each year. In 2022, the hospital announced plans to build a new facility as a replacement for its current building. The following year, it achieved Level I Trauma Center status. It is the second largest hospital in the state, behind Billings Clinic. St. Vincent Regional Hospital is run by Intermountain Health, which operates over 30 hospitals across the mountain west, including two others in Montana.

==== Billings Clinic ====
Billings Clinic started in 1911 as the general practice of Dr. Arthur J. Movius. By 1939, three new general practitioners had joined Dr. Movius's practice and the name was changed to The Billings Clinic. Billings Deaconess Hospital (founded in 1907) merged with Billings Clinic in 1990 to form the current hospital. Billings Clinic now employs over 4,500 people, including nearly 600 physicians, and is one of the largest employers in Montana. In January 2013, Billings Clinic was added to the Mayo Clinic Care Network, only the 12th hospital nationally to be added to the network and the only such health system in Montana. In 2023, Billings Clinic became the first Level I Trauma Center in Montana and Wyoming, covering a region of nearly 550 miles. Billings Clinic is part of One Sky Health.

=== Public safety ===
The Billings Police Department is the main law enforcement agency in Billings. It is the largest city police force in Montana, with about 162 sworn officers and 80 civilian employees. There are nine police beats.

The Billings Fire Department was founded in 1883 as a volunteer fire company named the Billings Fire Brigade. The Yellowstone Hook and Ladder Company was founded in 1886; that company was disbanded in 1888 after the mayor criticized the group for how that handled a fire, leaving the town without a fire department for almost six months. The last volunteer fire company, Maverick Hose Company, served as the city's fire department until 1918. The modern fire department has eight stations, employs 179 people, and received a class two rating by ISO.

== Notable people ==
More widely famous people who have lived in Billings include:

=== Historical ===
- Frank Borman, astronaut
- Albert D. Cooley, aviator and Lieutenant general, USMC; Navy Cross
- Will James, artist and author
- Calamity Jane, frontierswoman
- Liver-Eating Johnson, mountain man and sheriff
- Terry C. Johnston, western novelist
- Charles Lindbergh, aviator

=== Sports ===
- Gary Albright, wrestler
- Carolin Babcock, tennis player
- Jeff Ballard, Major League Baseball pitcher
- Ed Breding, former NFL player
- Julie Brown, distance runner
- Kurt Burris, former NFL player
- Mike Burton, Olympic gold medalist in swimming
- Ruben Castillo, boxer
- Jim Creighton, former NBA player
- Mitch Donahue, former NFL player
- Dwan Edwards, NFL player
- Brad Holland, former NBA player
- Chris Horn, former AFL and NFL player
- Dave McNally, Major League Baseball pitcher
- Roy McPipe, former ABA player
- Andy Moog, former NHL player
- Brent Musburger, sportscaster
- Nich Pertuit, football player
- Pat Pitney, Olympic gold medalist
- Kirk Scrafford, former NFL player
- Greg Smith, former NHL player
- Leslie Spalding, LPGA golfer
- Keith Wortman, former NFL player

=== Arts and entertainment ===
- Carson Allen, singer and musician
- Stanley Anderson, actor
- Katie Blair, Miss Montana Teen USA 2006, Miss Teen USA 2006
- John Dahl, movie director
- Timothy DeLaGhetto, internet and television personality
- Annie Duke, professional poker player and author
- Bob Enevoldsen, jazz multi-instrumentalist
- Andrea Fraser, artist
- Arlo Guthrie, folk singer
- Ethel Hays, cartoonist and illustrator
- David T. Hanson, environmental photographer
- Will James, western artist
- Brandon Jovanovich, opera singer
- Wesley Kimler, artist
- Jeff Kober, actor
- Leo Kottke, musician
- Wally Kurth, actor
- Joyce La Mers, author of light poetry
- Bud Luckey, Academy Award Nominee, famed Pixar animator for Toy Story 1–3
- Helen Lynch, actress
- T. J. Lynch, screenwriter
- Stan Lynde, creator of the comic strip Rick O'Shay, painter, and novelist
- Chase McBride, singer, musician, and visual artist
- Ralph McQuarrie, Academy Award-winning designer for Cocoon, the original Star Wars trilogy, the original Battlestar Galactica, and E.T.: The Extra-Terrestrial
- Marlene Morrow, former Playboy Playmate of the Month
- J. K. Ralston, Western painter
- Chan Romero, pioneer of rock and roll was born in Billings
- Rick Rydell, talk radio host
- Pete Simpson, musician and television performer in the 1950s in Billings; later member of the Wyoming House of Representatives; Republican nominee for governor of Wyoming in 1986.
- Auggie Smith, comedian
- Carol Thurston, actress
- Chuck Tingle, two-time Hugo Award nominee
- David Yost, actor and producer, most notably the Blue Power Ranger on the Mighty Morphin Power Rangers

=== Political ===
- James F. Battin, former congressman from Montana
- Jim Battin, California state senator
- Shane Bemis, Mayor of Gresham, Oregon
- John Bohlinger, former lieutenant governor of Montana
- Roy Brown, former Montana state senator for District 25 and former gubernatorial candidate
- Conrad Burns, served in the U.S. Senate from 1988 to 2007
- Amanda Curtis, Montana state representative for District 76 and U.S. Senate Democratic candidate
- Hazel Hunkins Hallinan, women's rights activist and journalist
- Mike Mansfield, U.S. representative and U.S. senator for Montana, longest-serving Senate majority leader for Democratic Party, and U.S. Ambassador to Japan
- Margaret MacDonald, former Montana state senator and representative
- Jonathan McNiven, former Montana state representative
- Ray Metcalfe, member of the Alaska House of Representatives
- Henry L. Myers, U.S. senator and justice of the Supreme Court of Montana
- I. D. O'Donnell, Supervisor of Irrigation for the U.S. Reclamation Service from 1913 to 1918
- Denny Rehberg, former congressman from Montana and former lieutenant governor of Montana
- Tom Stout, former congressman from Montana and editorial writer for the Billings Gazette
- Burt L. Talcott, former congressman from California

== Sister cities ==
- Billings, Hessen, Germany
- Kumamoto, Kumamoto, Japan

== See also ==
- The USS Billings (LCS-15), a Freedom-class littoral combat ship of the United States Navy that is named after the city of Billings
