= Four Dances Natural Area =

Public land in Billings, Montana, US

Coordinates: 45°45′54″N 108°27′25″W

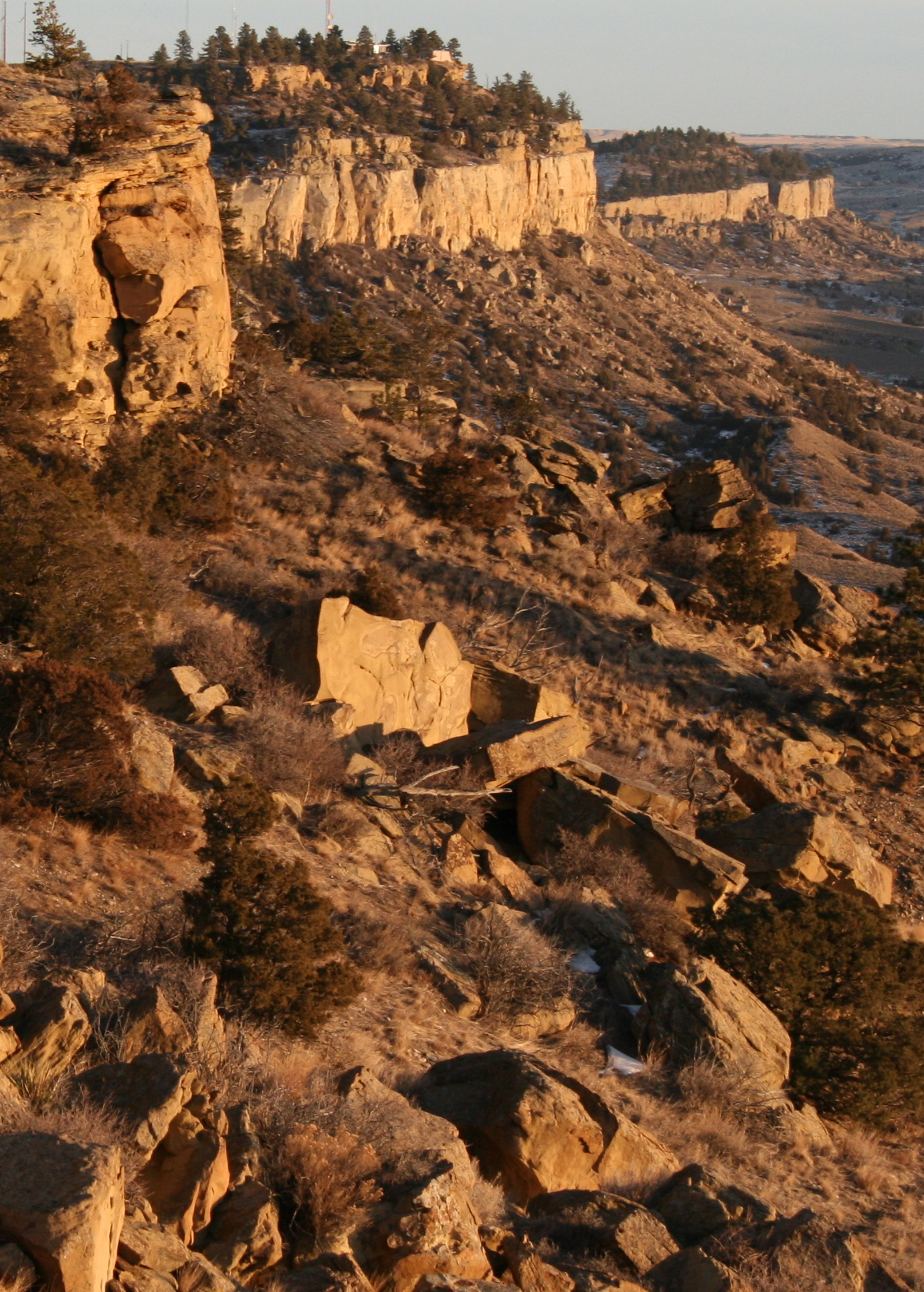
Billings, Montana Four Dances Natural Area

Four Dances Natural Area is 765 acres (310 ha) of undeveloped open space which were preserved in Billings, Montana, United States, and became public land. The area was named after Chief Four Dances, an important religious and military figure in the history of the Crow Nation. The name in the Crow language is Annishi Shopash, translated as "Place of Four Dances". This area is traditionally recognized as a fasting site used by Four Dances in the 1830s, during the height of the Rocky Mountain fur trade and the intertribal plains wars. Four Dances took his name from the vision he received while fasting at this place.

The area is on a plateau located 2 miles (3 km) east of downtown Billings and is bordered on the east side by Coburn Road. On the west, the plateau is edged with cliffs that drop 200 to 800 feet (61 to 244 m) to the Yellowstone River.
