= Diamond X =

Disc golf course in Montana, USA

Coordinates: 45.816365°N 108.688315°W

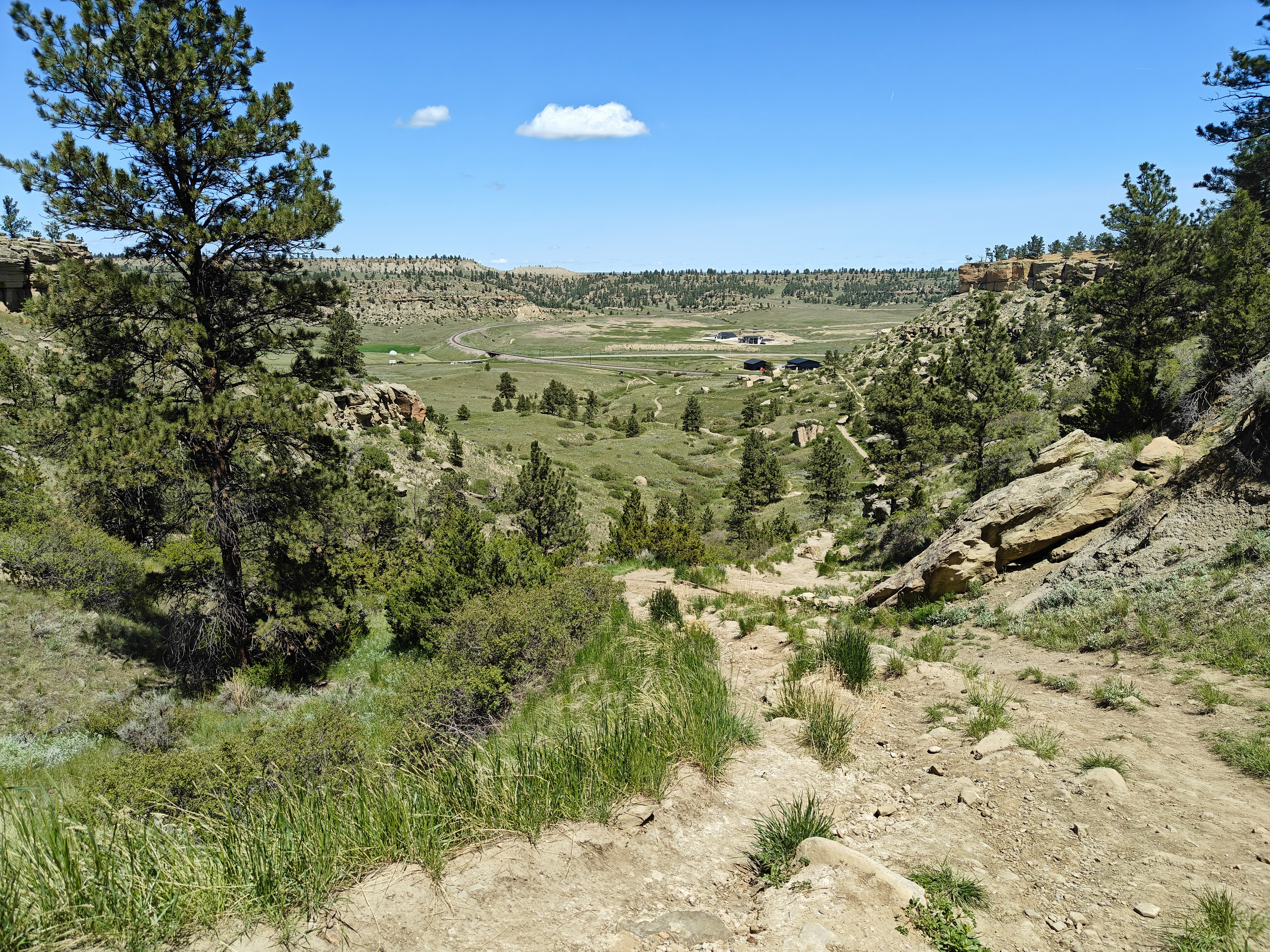
Phipps Park, 2025

Diamond X is a 36-hole disc golf course located in Phipps Park, in Billings, Montana. Established in 1997, it is widely regarded as one of the most challenging and most wish-listed courses in the sport. Diamond X is notable for being where Brent Bell set the world record for disc golf's longest ace at 726 feet during the 2002 Big Sky State Games.
