= Flag of Billings, Montana =

City of Billings
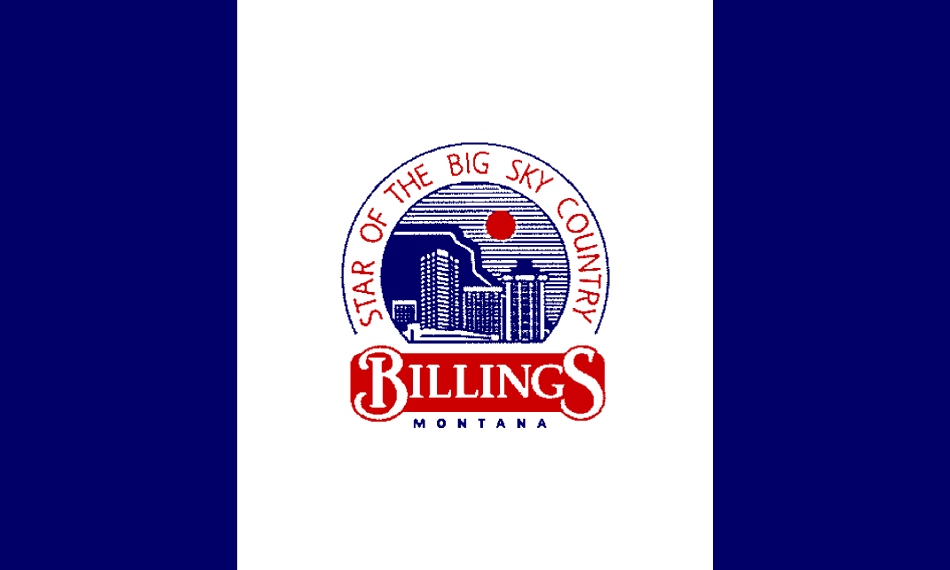
- Proportion: 3:5
- Adopted: June 1986
- Design: A blue and white tricolor containing a logo-style seal in the middle.
- Designed by: Fernando Méndez

The current flag of Billings, Montana is a triband of dark blue and white with the city seal on the central white panel. The center white band (pale) occupies half the length of the flag in a 1:2:1 proportion. The seal shows the city skyline line-drawn in blue, with a red disc representing the sun. The seal is outlined in blue with the text "Star of the Big Sky Country" in red capitals. It was designed by Fernando Méndez and adopted in June 1986.

== History ==
On February 3, 1986, the City Council of Billings approved a citywide contest to design a new flag and seal with a $500 prize for each with a deadline set for May 15. The two contests drew 66 total entries and were won by Fernando Méndez, an immigrant from the Philippines who worked part-time as an art director for a local advertising firm. He was paid $1,000 for his work and the flag was adopted by the city government.

In 2004, the North American Vexillological Association conducted an internet survey of 150 city flags across the US. Billings' flag ranked 106th place out of 150 flags. It received 3.35 points on a 0-10 scale, or D+ rating.
