= Boothill Cemetery (Billings, Montana) =

Historic cemetery in Yellowstone County, Montana, US

- U.S. National Register of Historic Places
- Boothill Cemetery, 2026

- Location within Montana Location within the United States
- Nearest city: Billings, Montana
- Coordinates: 45°48′09″N 108°28′50″W
- Area: 0.1 acres (0.040 ha)
- NRHP reference No.: 79001428
- Added to NRHP: April 17, 1979

Boothill Cemetery, also known as Coulson Cemetery, is a historic pioneer cemetery in Billings, Montana. It is the only surviving remnant of the ghost town of Coulson. Boothill Cemetery has been listed on the National Register of Historic Places since April 17, 1979.

== History ==
Boothill Cemetery was founded as the burial ground for Coulson, Montana, which was active from 1877 to 1882. Coulson was located on the nearby bank of the Yellowstone River. It was founded by P. W. McAdow, who predicted the success of a town at the site once the area was reached by the Northern Pacific Railway. As one of the earliest settlements in the area, Coulson is remembered as a "wild and woolly" town with frequent violent deaths. Thus, the cemetery gained its named because of Coulson residents who died "with their boots on." However, some deaths were nonviolent, instead being caused by diseases or accidents.

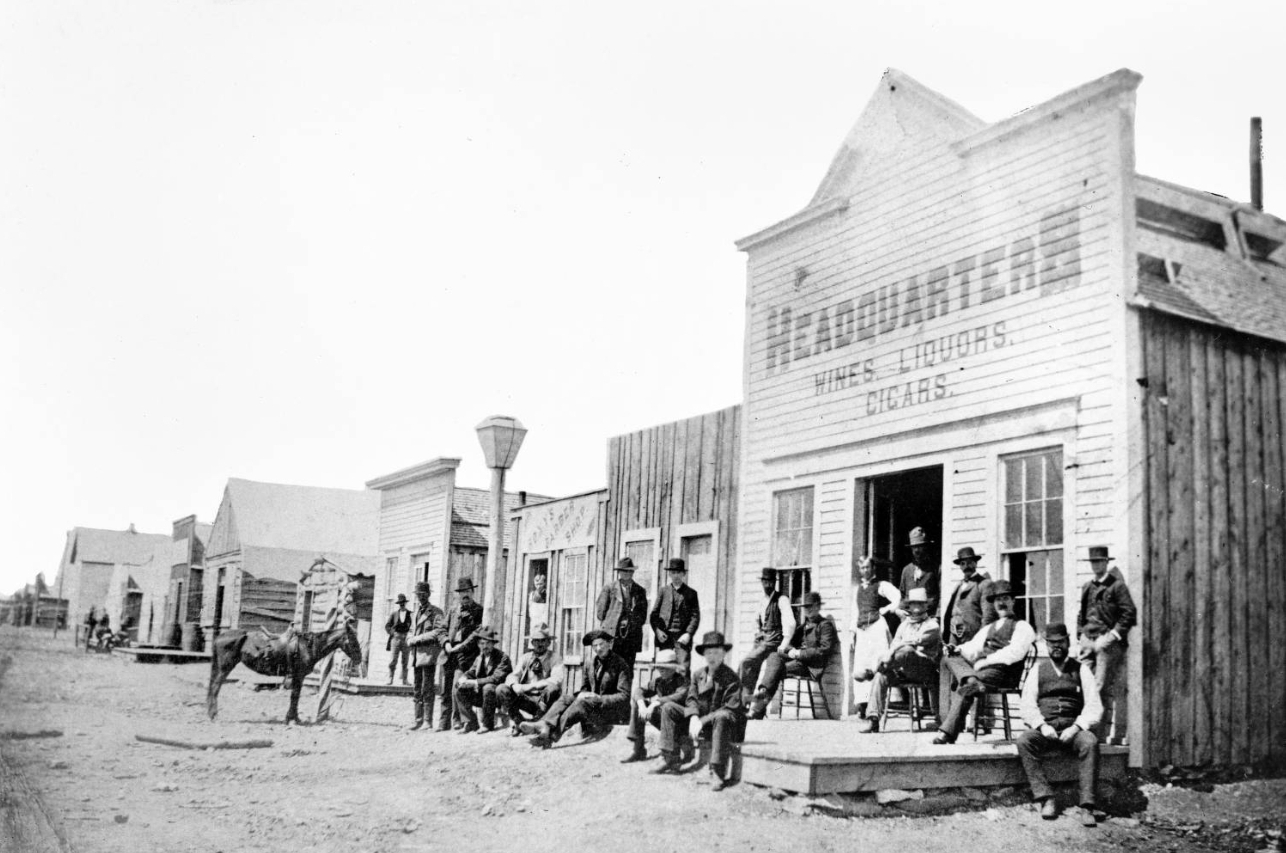
Coulson in 1882

At its height, Coulson had a hotel, three general stores, five saloons, a post office, and a newspaper, among other businesses. However, when the railroad was finally built in 1882, it bypassed Coulson. It was instead routed through the new townsite of Billings, where the residents of Coulson soon relocated. Soon after the last burial at Boothill Cemetery in 1884, the cemetery entered a period of abandon and neglect.

In the 1920s, ownership of the cemetery was granted to I. D. O'Donnell, a Billings businessman who paved the way for agriculture in the region through his innovations at Hesper Farm. O'Donnell, who was interested in preserving the cemetery, researched the its burials. He also erected a rock-and-mortar obelisk—the first memorialization of a historic site in Billings, tapping into the romanticization of the Wild West. Observing the city growing closer to Boothill Cemetery, O'Donnell deeded the cemetery to the City of Billings in 1929, intending to preserve it as a city park.

Another round of improvements came in the 1970s. A steel entrance sign was installed in 1970. The Billings Parks Department and Heights Kiwanis Club installed a fence and regularly mowed the grass. Boy Scouts created replicas of the original wooden headboards. In 1978, multiple local organizations collaboratively purchased and dedicated a new granite headstone for H. M. "Muggins" Taylor.

In 2023 and 2024, a group named Friends of Boothill Cemetery renewed efforts to maintain and improve the site. Renovations included moving the interpretive sign to the parking lot, adding two roadside signs, and installing a flag pole and park benches. An interpretative sign related to the cliff at MetraPark was relocated from the cemetery to the Earl Guss Park nearby.

== Description ==
Boothill Cemetery viewed from the Rimrocks

Boothill Cemetery sits on a small hill at the eastern end of the North Rimrocks, near MetraPark. The cemetery is the namesake of the Boothill Inn, a hotel directly across the street. Boothill Cemetery is one of several historic burial sites in the immediate area. One is Skull Mountain ("The Place of the Skulls"), which in the 19th century was the site of Apsáalooke scaffold burials associated with the smallpox epidemic. The other is the grave of Luther Kelly.

Early historical research identified around 35 people buried at Boothill Cemetery. The actual number of burials is likely between 130 and 150, according to ground-penetrating imaging research in 2019 led by MSU Billings history professor Tom Rust. Known burials include Coulson residents, soldiers, a Northern Pacific employee, and Judge Faulkes (a Justice of the Peace who was struck by a railroad locomotive). The oldest burials are Milton Summer and Klint Dills, both trappers, who were killed by Nez Perce warriors in 1877.

Map plaque (left) and obelisk (right)

One notable burial is H. M. "Muggins" Taylor, a civilian scout who rode to Fort Ellis to deliver news of General Custer's defeat at the Battle of the Little Bighorn. Taylor later served as the deputy sheriff for Coulson, reporting to the Custer County Sheriff. Taylor died in 1882 during a dispute with a drunk Coulson resident.

The rock-and-mortar obelisk at the cemetery dates to 1922. Marble plaques embedded in the obelisk's four sides are inscribed with verses memorializing the individuals buried at the site. The verses were written by Anna Shuart, whose husband Benjamin F. Shuart conducted multiple funerals at the cemetery soon after his 1882 arrival in Billings.

== See also ==
- Boot Hill
- Timeline of Billings, Montana
