= Angus V. McIver =

American architect

Angus Vaughn McIver
- Born: April 29, 1892; Great Falls, Montana, U.S.
- Died: July 24, 1974 (aged 82); Great Falls, Montana, U.S.
- Education: University of Michigan
- Occupation: Architect
- Spouses: Loneta E. Kuhn; Valborg Ryan
- Children: 1 daughter

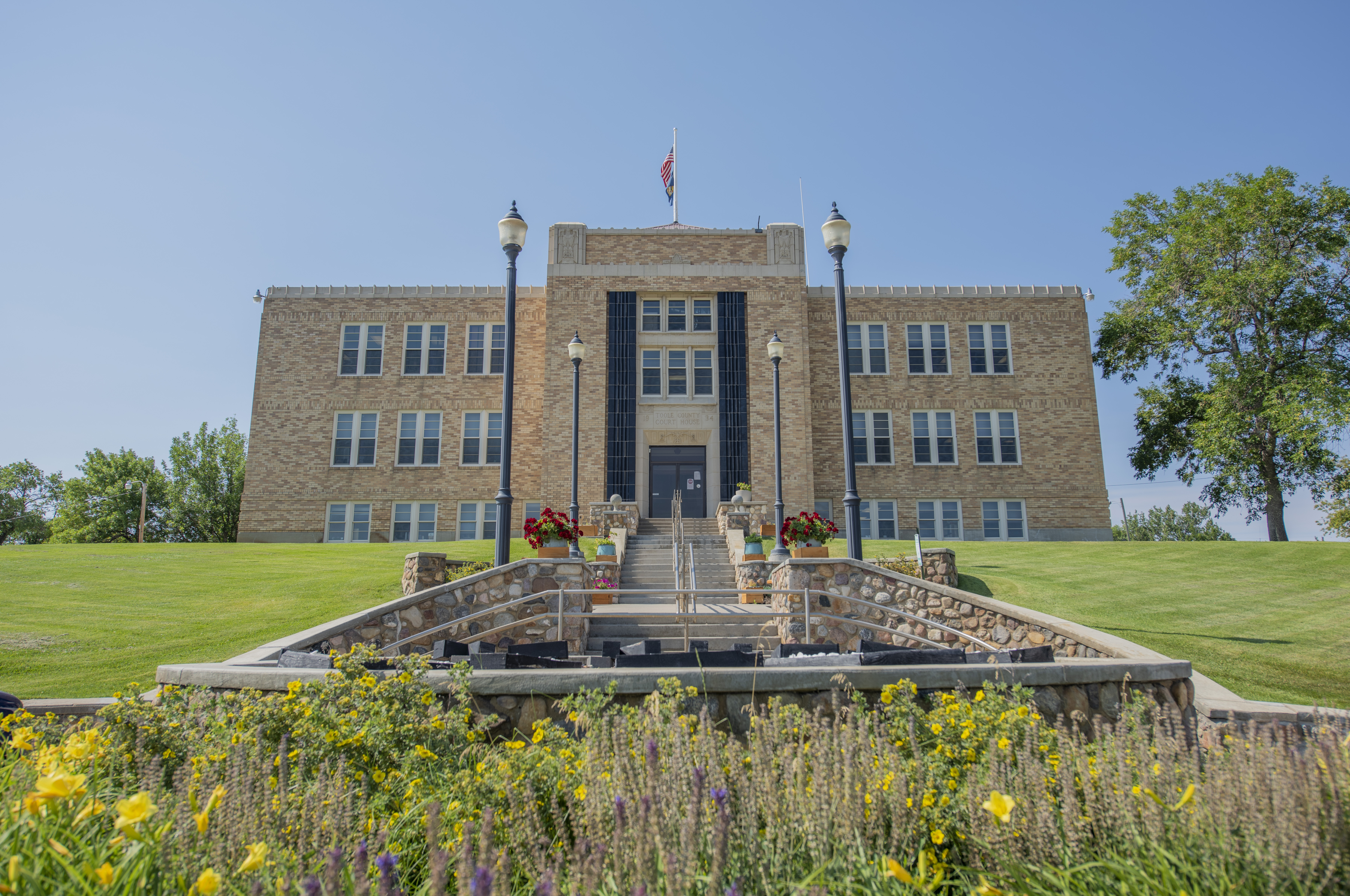
The Toole County Courthouse in Shelby, designed by McIver, for McIver & Cohagen, in the Art Deco style and completed in 1934.

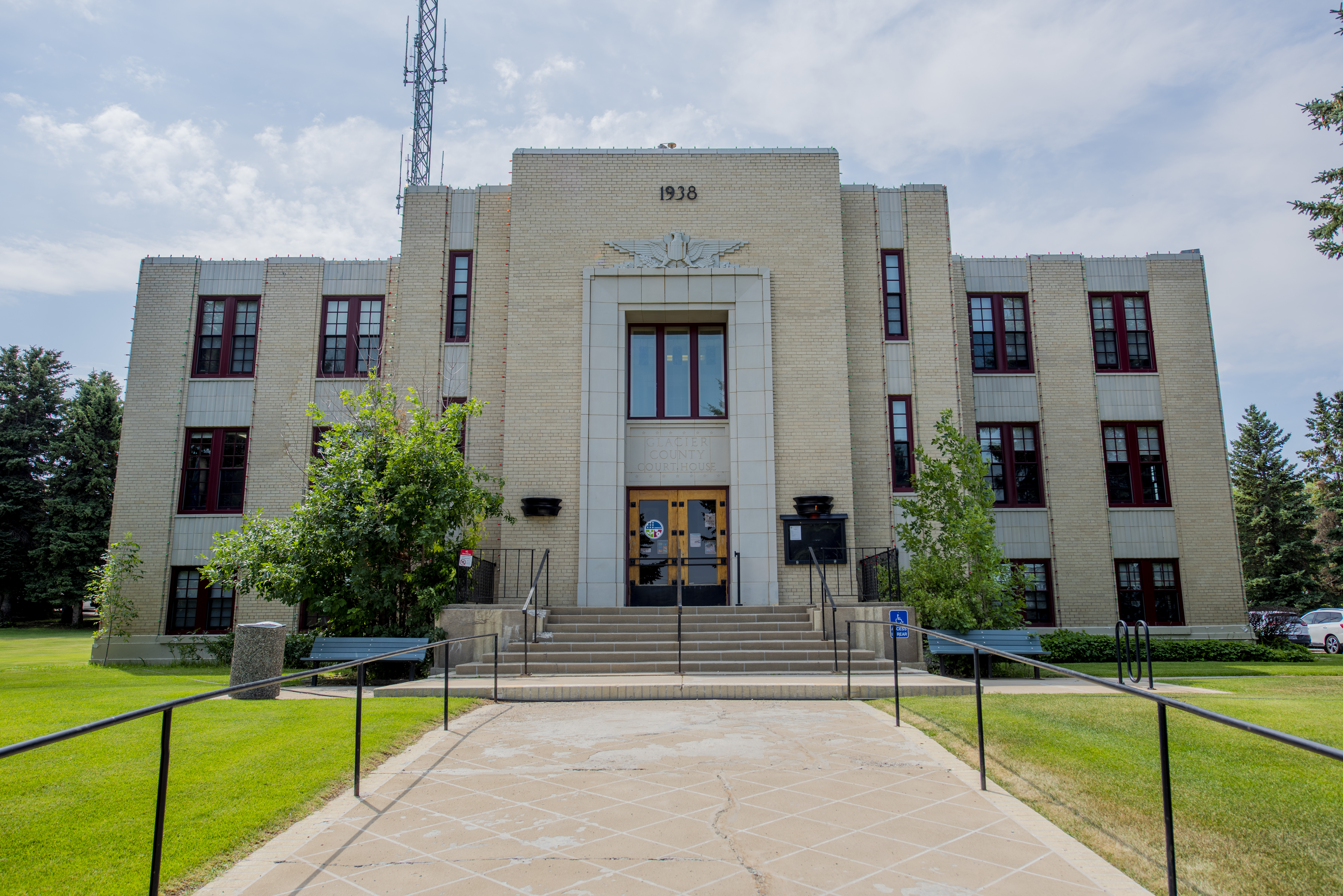
The Glacier County Courthouse in Cut Bank, designed by McIver in the Art Deco style and completed in 1939.

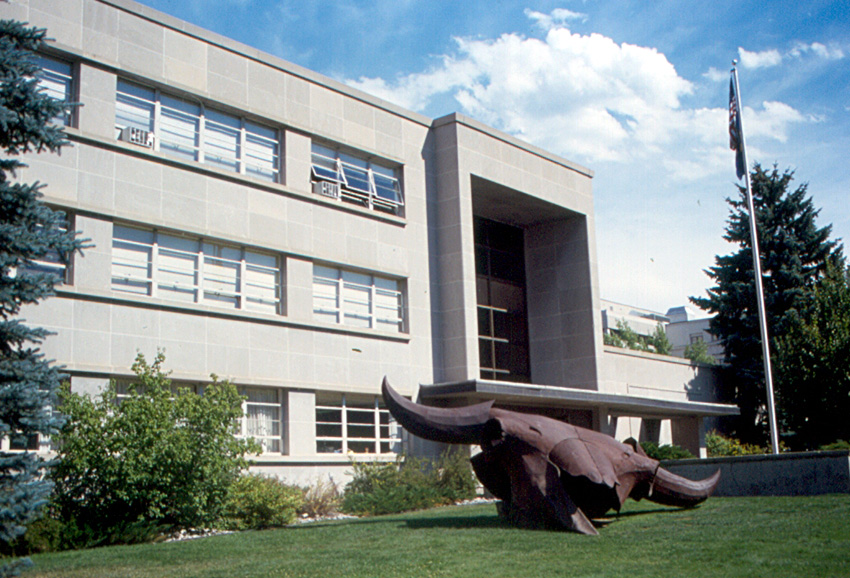
The Montana Veterans and Pioneers Memorial Building in Helena, designed by A. V. McIver & Associates and completed in 1953.

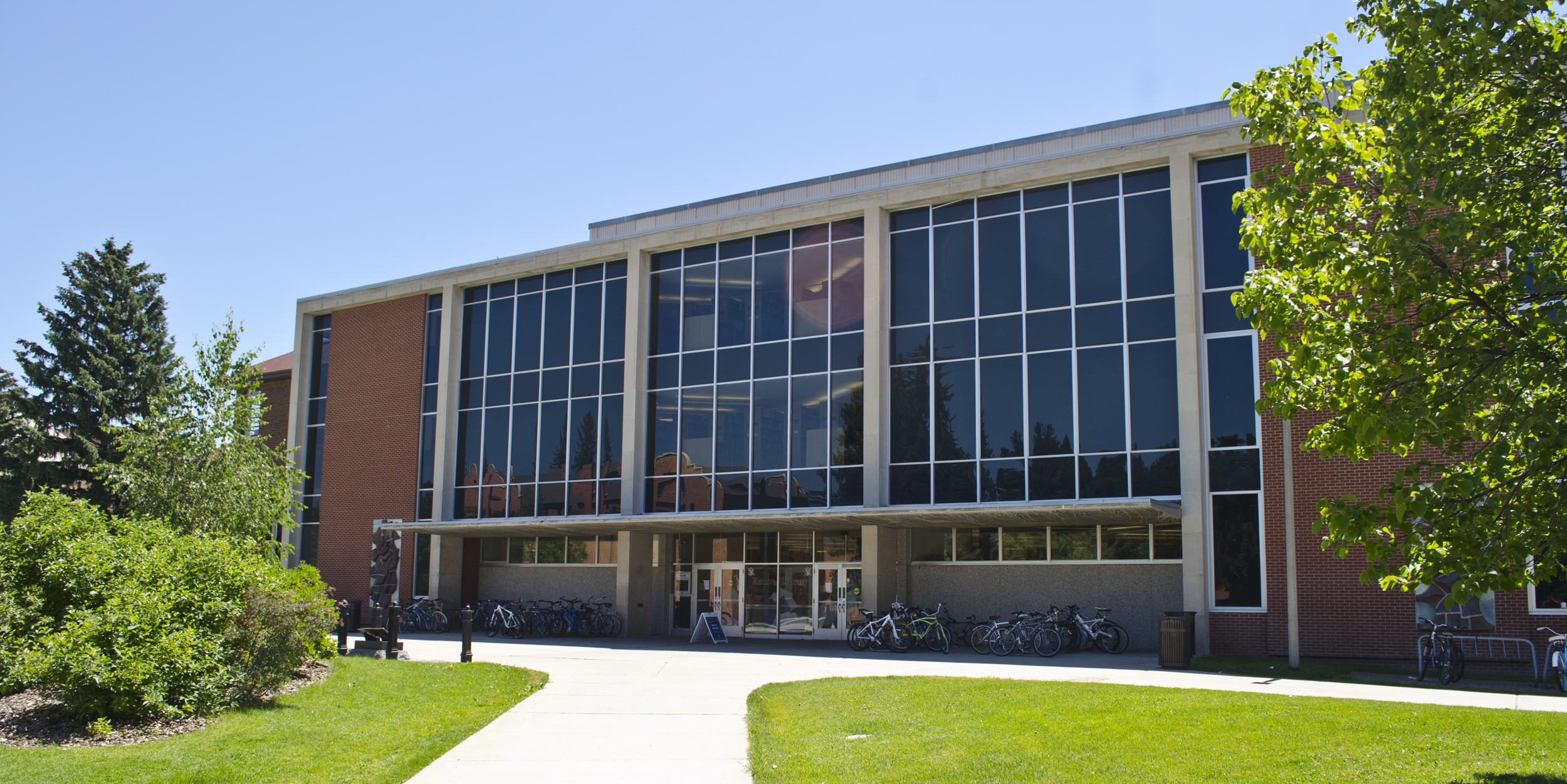
The Montana State University Library, designed by McIver & Hess in a modernist style and completed in 1966.

Angus V. McIver (April 29, 1892 – July 24, 1974) was an American architect who designed many buildings in the state of Montana.

== Early life ==
McIver was born on April 29, 1892, in Great Falls, Montana. He graduated from the University of Michigan in 1915.

== Career ==
McIver became an architect in Great Falls, Montana, in 1915, when he co-founded the firm of McIver, Cohagen & Marshall with Chandler C. Cohagen and Walter V. Marshall. He served in the United States Army during World War I from 1917 to 1919. From 1919 to 1936, he was a partner in McIver & Cohagen. In 1950 he formed a new partnership, A. V. McIver & Associates, with William J. Hess, his chief draftsman, and Knute Haugsjaa, chief designer. In 1953 the firm was renamed McIver, Hess & Haugsjaa and McIver & Hess in 1959 after Haugsjaa's death. McIver retired in 1969. Over the course of his career, McIver designed many churches, hospitals and schools, as well as the courthouses of Toole County, Glacier County and Pondera County. Among his major works is the Montana Veterans and Pioneers Memorial Building in Helena, built from 1950 to 1953 and listed on the National Register of Historic Places in 2004.

In 1949 McIver was the first Montana architect to be elected a Fellow of the American Institute of Architects.

== Personal life and death ==
McIver was married twice. He was married to Loneta E. Kuhn in 1915 until her death in 1959. He married Valborg Ryan in 1966. He had a daughter. He was a Freemason.

McIver died at 82 on July 24, 1974, in Great Falls.

== Architectural works ==
=== McIver & Cohagen, 1919–1936 ===
- 1920 – First Presbyterian Church (former), 1180 Cedar St, Forsyth, Montana
  - Designed by Howard Van Doren Shaw, architect, with McIver & Cohagen, supervising architects. NRHP-listed.
- 1920 – Garfield School, 3212 First Ave S, Billings, Montana
  - NRHP-listed.
- 1921 – Rosebud County Deaconess Hospital (former). 281 N Seventeenth Ave, Forsyth, Montana
  - NRHP-listed.
- 1921 – Hardin Primary School, 314 3rd St, Hardin, Montana
- 1923 – University Library (former), University of Montana, Missoula, Montana
  - Now the Social Science Building.
- 1928 – Montana Odd Fellows Home (former), 2245 Head Ln, Helena, Montana
- 1930 – Oliver Building reconstruction, 2702 Montana Ave, Billings, Montana
  - Originally built in 1910 and rebuilt by McIver & Cohagen after a fire. NRHP-listed.
- 1932 – United States Post Office and Courthouse additions, 2602 First Ave N, Billings, Montana
  - Originally built in 1914 from plans by Supervising Architect Oscar Wenderoth. NRHP-listed.
- 1934 – Toole County Courthouse, 226 1st St S, Shelby, Montana
- 1935 – McMullen Hall, Montana State University Billings, Billings, Montana
  - NRHP-listed.
- 1937 – Grand Lodge of Montana, 425 N Park Ave, Helena, Montana

=== A. V. McIver, 1936–1950 ===
- 1938 – Pondera County Courthouse, 20 Fourth Ave SW, Conrad, Montana
- 1939 – Glacier County Courthouse, 512 E Main St, Cut Bank, Montana
  - NRHP-listed.
- 1951 – Miles City VA Hospital, 210 S Winchester Ave, Miles City, Montana
  - Designed by A. V. McIver and Cushing & Terrell, associated architects.

=== A. V. McIver & Associates, 1950–1953 ===
- 1953 – Montana Veterans and Pioneers Memorial Building, 225 N Roberts St, Helena, Montana
  - NRHP-listed.
- 1953 – C. M. Russell Museum, 400 13th St N, Great Falls, Montana

=== McIver, Hess & Haugsjaa, 1953–1959 ===
- 1955 – St. Paul Lutheran Church, US-2, Cut Bank, Montana

=== McIver & Hess, 1959–1969 ===
- 1960 – Langford Hall, Montana State University, Billings, Montana
- 1966 – Montana State University Library, Montana State University, Billings, Montana
- 1967 – Great Falls Public Library, 301 2nd Ave N, Great Falls, Montana
