= National Register of Historic Places listings in Yellowstone County, Montana =

Location of Yellowstone County in Montana

This is a list of the National Register of Historic Places listings in Yellowstone County, Montana. It is intended to be a complete list of the properties and districts on the National Register of Historic Places in Yellowstone County, Montana, United States. The locations of National Register properties and districts for which the latitude and longitude coordinates are included below, may be seen in a map.

There are 47 properties and districts listed on the National Register in the county, including 2 National Historic Landmarks.

This National Park Service list is complete through NPS recent listings posted September 25, 2026.

== Listings county-wide ==
	Name on the Register	Image	Date listed	Location	City or town	Description
1	Acme Building	Acme Building	November 9, 2005 (#05001279)	109-111 N. Broadway; 45°46′59″N 108°30′14″W	Billings	
2	Antelope Stage Station	Antelope Stage Station	January 19, 1983 (#83001078)	East of Broadview; 46°02′38″N 108°43′53″W	Broadview	
3	Armour Cold Storage	Armour Cold Storage	July 7, 2004 (#04000670)	1 S. Broadway; 45°46′50″N 108°30′12″W	Billings	
4	Babcock Theatre Building	Babcock Theatre Building	April 9, 2013 (#13000153)	114-124 N. 28th & 2808-2812 2nd Aves. 45°46′58″N 108°30′26″W	Billings	
5	James F. Battin Federal Building (Courthouse & Federal Office Building)	James F. Battin Federal Building (Courthouse & Federal Office Building)	January 13, 2023 (#100008535)	316 North 26th St. 45°47′07″N 108°30′20″W	Billings	
6	Billings Chamber of Commerce Building	Billings Chamber of Commerce Building	January 20, 1972 (#72000739)	303 N. 27th St. 45°47′05″N 108°30′19″W	Billings	
7	Billings Communal Mausoleum	Billings Communal Mausoleum	June 28, 2021 (#100006704)	1704 Central Ave. 45°46′04″N 108°33′40″W	Billings	
8	Billings First Congregational Church	Billings First Congregational Church	December 29, 2025 (#100012464)	310 N. 27th St. 45°47′04″N 108°30′24″W	Billings	
9	Billings Historic District	Billings Historic District	March 13, 1979 (#79001427)	Roughly bounded by N. 23rd and N. 25th Sts. and 1st and Montana Aves.; also 2600 (2528), 2604-2606, 2608, 2610-2614, and 2624 Montana Ave. 45°47′02″N 108°29′59″W	Billings	Locally also known as the Billings Townsite Historic District, this district was created in 1979 and expanded on April 20, 2006
10	Billings Old Town Historic District	Billings Old Town Historic District	September 16, 2010 (#10000753)	Generally bounded by Montana Ave. on the north; S. 26th on the east; 1st Ave., S on the south; and S. 30th St. on the west 45°46′50″N 108°30′15″W	Billings	
11	Billings West Side School	Billings West Side School	March 20, 2002 (#02000214)	415 Broadwater Ave. 45°46′40″N 108°31′32″W	Billings	
12	Black Otter Trail	Black Otter Trail	January 5, 2007 (#06001224)	Black Otter Trail; 45°48′02″N 108°29′49″W	Billings	
13	Boothill Cemetery	Boothill Cemetery	April 17, 1979 (#79001428)	North of Billings; 45°48′09″N 108°28′48″W	Billings	
14	Carpenter Paper Company	Carpenter Paper Company	December 29, 2025 (#100012486)	2019 Montana Ave. 45°47′09″N 108°29′47″W	Billings	Event Center at the Paper Mill
15	Crystal Ice & Fuel Company	Crystal Ice & Fuel Company	April 15, 2024 (#100010218)	19 North 22nd Street; 45°47′07″N 108°29′53″W	Billings	
16	Dude Rancher Lodge	Dude Rancher Lodge	July 22, 2010 (#10000489)	415 N. 29th St. 45°47′05″N 108°30′35″W	Billings	
17	Electric Building	Electric Building	March 1, 2002 (#02000105)	113-115 Broadway; 45°47′04″N 108°30′22″W	Billings	
18	Abraham and Carrie Erb House	Abraham and Carrie Erb House	June 9, 2005 (#05000564)	110 4th Ave. 45°40′12″N 108°46′32″W	Laurel	
19	Fire House No. 2	Fire House No. 2	February 29, 1980 (#80002436)	201 E. 30th St. 45°46′39″N 108°30′12″W	Billings	
20	Fratt-Link House	Fratt-Link House	November 9, 2020 (#100005777)	142 Clark Ave. 45°46′48″N 108°31′12″W	Billings	
21	Kate Fratt Memorial Parochial School	Kate Fratt Memorial Parochial School	July 28, 2020 (#100005389)	205 North 32nd St. 45°46′52″N 108°30′43″W	Billings	
22	Garfield School	Garfield School	October 3, 2012 (#12000830)	3212 1st Ave., S 45°46′35″N 108°30′30″W	Billings	
23	Arnold Graf House	Arnold Graf House	April 20, 2015 (#15000160)	633 Highland Park Dr. 45°47′49″N 108°31′57″W	Billings	
24	Hoskins Basin Archeological District	Hoskins Basin Archeological District	November 20, 1974 (#74001100)	Address restricted	Billings	
25	Huntley Bridge	Huntley Bridge	March 26, 2012 (#12000175)	Mile 12, MT 312, over the Yellowstone River; 45°54′14″N 108°19′04″W	Huntley	
26	Huntley Project Office	Huntley Project Office	June 5, 2017 (#100001033)	2291 2nd St., W. 45°57′00″N 108°08′42″W	Ballantine	
27	L and L Building	L and L Building	October 1, 1979 (#08001227)	2624 Minnesota Ave. 45°46′53″N 108°30′07″W	Billings	
28	Laurel Downtown Historic District	Laurel Downtown Historic District	September 16, 2010 (#10000768)	Roughly bounded by the Burlington Northern Santa Fe Railway Company tracks to the south, Third St., S. to the north, Wyoming Ave. 45°40′11″N 108°46′12″W	Laurel	
29	Masonic Temple	Masonic Temple	April 17, 1986 (#86000847)	2806 3rd Ave., N. 45°47′01″N 108°30′25″W	Billings	
30	McKinley Elementary School	McKinley Elementary School	March 16, 2021 (#100006311)	820 North 31st St. 45°47′12″N 108°30′57″W	Billings	
31	McMullen Hall	McMullen Hall	September 8, 2015 (#15000574)	1500 University Dr. 45°47′48″N 108°31′19″W	Billings	
32	Montana National Bank	Montana National Bank	March 14, 2022 (#100007494)	201 North Broadway; 45°46′59″N 108°30′24″W	Billings	
33	Preston B. Moss House	Preston B. Moss House	April 30, 1982 (#82003181)	914 Division St. 45°46′46″N 108°30′55″W	Billings	
34	Mossman Overpass	Mossman Overpass	March 26, 2012 (#12000174)	Mile 57 on an Interstate 90 frontage road 45°40′57″N 108°42′50″W	Laurel	Over railroad tracks.
35	Austin North House	Austin North House	November 23, 1977 (#77000822)	622 N. 29th St. 45°47′11″N 108°30′41″W	Billings	
36	North Elevation Historic District	North Elevation Historic District	November 29, 2016 (#16000807)	Bounded by 12th Ave. N, alley between N 31st & 30th Sts., 9th Ave. N & 32ns St. N 45°47′23″N 108°31′08″W	Billings	
37	Northern Hotel	Northern Hotel	June 12, 2013 (#13000369)	19 N. Broadway; 45°46′55″N 108°30′20″W	Billings	
38	I.D. O'Donnell House	I.D. O'Donnell House	November 23, 1977 (#77000823)	105 Clark Ave. 45°46′49″N 108°31′02″W	Billings	
39	Oliver Building	Oliver Building	October 1, 1979 (#08001228)	2702 Montana Ave. 45°46′54″N 108°30′14″W	Billings	
40	Parmly Billings Memorial Library	Parmly Billings Memorial Library	October 26, 1972 (#72000740)	2822 Montana Ave. 45°46′50″N 108°30′21″W	Billings	
41	Pictograph Cave	Pictograph Cave	October 15, 1966 (#66000439)	7 miles (11 km) southeast of Billings in Indian Caves Park; 45°44′12″N 108°25′56″W	Billings	
42	Pioneer Park	Pioneer Park	April 13, 2021 (#100006391)	Roughly bounded by Parkhill Dr., 3rd St. West, and Virginia Ln. 45°47′16″N 108°31′30″W	Billings	
43	Pompey's Pillar	Pompey's Pillar	October 15, 1966 (#66000440)	West of Pompey; 45°59′44″N 108°00′17″W	Pompey's Pillar	
44	Prescott Commons	Prescott Commons	April 30, 1982 (#82003182)	Rimrock Rd. 45°47′52″N 108°33′08″W	Billings	
45	Riverside Park, Laurel	Riverside Park, Laurel	2024-11-044 (#100010974)	1425 U.S. Highway 212 South; 45°39′12″N 108°45′26″W	Laurel	
46	Harold and Marion Ruth House		June 21, 2007 (#07000578)	111 Emerald Dr. 45°48′21″N 108°28′56″W	Billings	
47	U.S. Post Office and Courthouse-Billings	U.S. Post Office and Courthouse-Billings	March 14, 1986 (#86000678)	2602 1st Ave., N. 45°46′58″N 108°30′10″W	Billings	
48	Christian Yegen House	Christian Yegen House	October 1, 1979 (#79003779)	208 S. 35th St. 45°46′26″N 108°30′36″W	Billings	
49	Peter Yegen House	Peter Yegen House	April 16, 1980 (#80002437)	209 S. 35th St. 45°46′27″N 108°30′35″W	Billings	

== See also ==
- List of National Historic Landmarks in Montana
- National Register of Historic Places listings in Montana
