= Billings First Congregational Church =

- First Congregational United Church of Christ
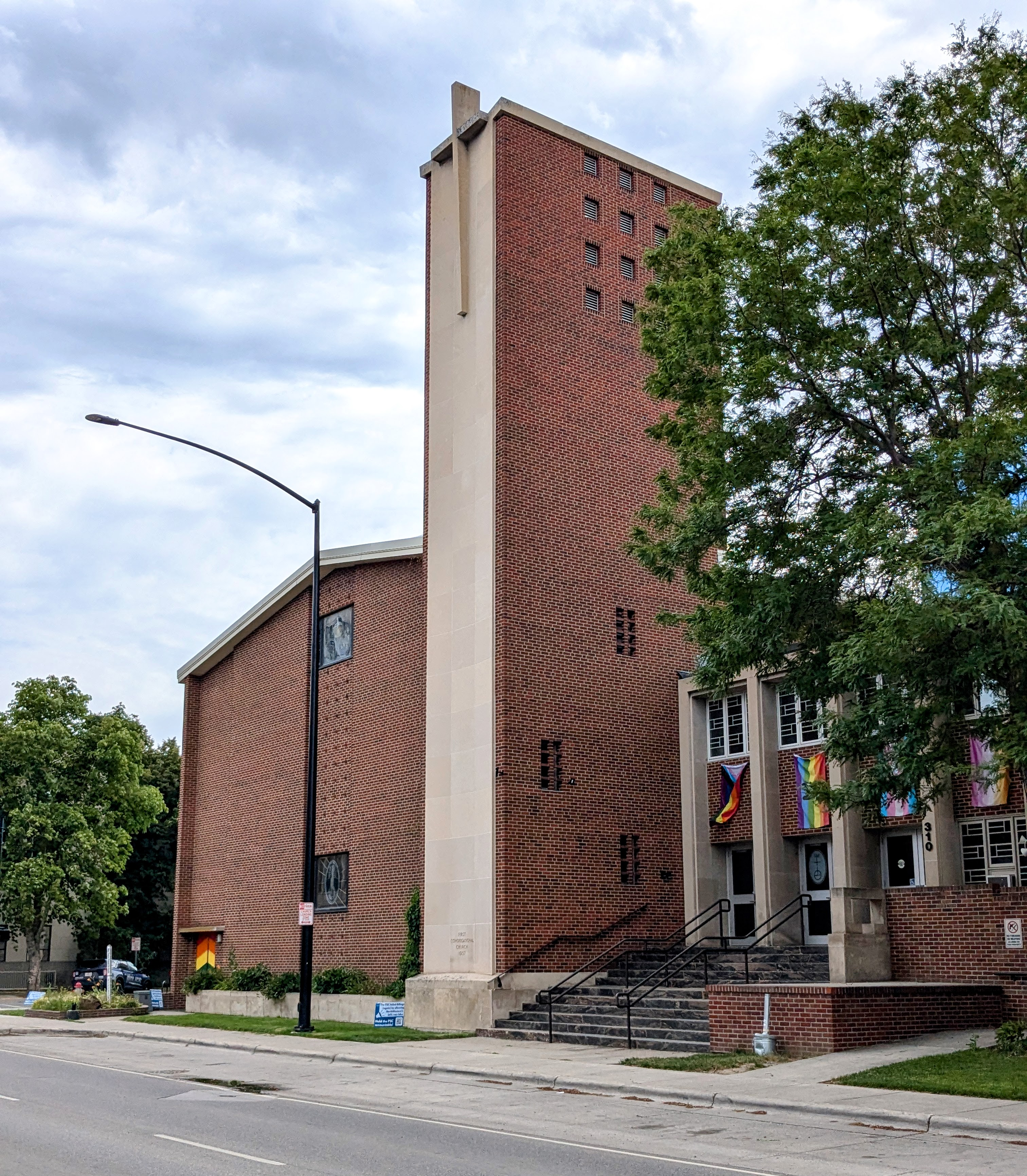
- Belltower and front entry, 2024
- Location: 310 N. 27th St. Billings, Montana 59101
- Country: United States
- Denomination: United Church of Christ
- Previous denomination: Congregational Christian Churches
- Website: billingsfirstchurch.org

History
- Founded: 24 May 1882
- Founder: Benjamin F. Shuart

Administration
- Division: Montana–Northern Wyoming Conference
- Billings First Congregational Church
- U.S. National Register of Historic Places
- Coordinates: 45°47′04″N 108°30′25″W
- Built: 1957 (Church Addition); 1951 (Education Wing); 1928 (Parish House)
- Architectural style: Mid-Century Modern; Colonial Revival
- NRHP reference No.: 100012464
- Added to NRHP: December 29, 2025

Billings First Congregational Church, also known as Billings First Church, is an Open and Affirming United Church of Christ (UCC) congregation in downtown Billings, Montana.

First Congregational was founded in 1882 as Billings' first church of any Christian denomination. Its initial building was funded by Frederick Billings, for whom the city is named. First Congregational is the oldest church in the UCC's Montana–Northern Wyoming Conference and was historically known as the conference's unofficial "cathedral church." The current church building is listed on the National Register of Historic Places.

== History ==
=== Founding ===
American Home Missionary Society superintendents Delavin L. Leonard and Henry Clay Simmons visited Montana in 1882. In prior years, the Society had considered Montana too sparsely populated to justify missionary work, but access to the state was improving as the Utah and Northern Railway and Northern Pacific Railway extended their reaches. A church was established in Butte in April; the congregation would last 13 years before dissolving in 1895. In May, the Society established as second church, this one in Billings. At the time, Billings was a tent city with few permanent residents.

To establish a Billings church, the American Home Missionary Society sent Benjamin F. Shuart, a newly ordained minister from Ohio. Shuart rode a train to Miles City, then road his horse and buggy to Coulson. Upon staying at a hotel, he was warned that he would surely starve in Billings, and he would be wise to find mission prospects beyond the mountains. Upon arriving in Billings, Shuart found a town characterized by gambling, prostitution, and heavy drinking. Undeterred, Shuart found enough congregants to formally organize Billings' first church on May 24, 1882.

=== 1882–1950 ===
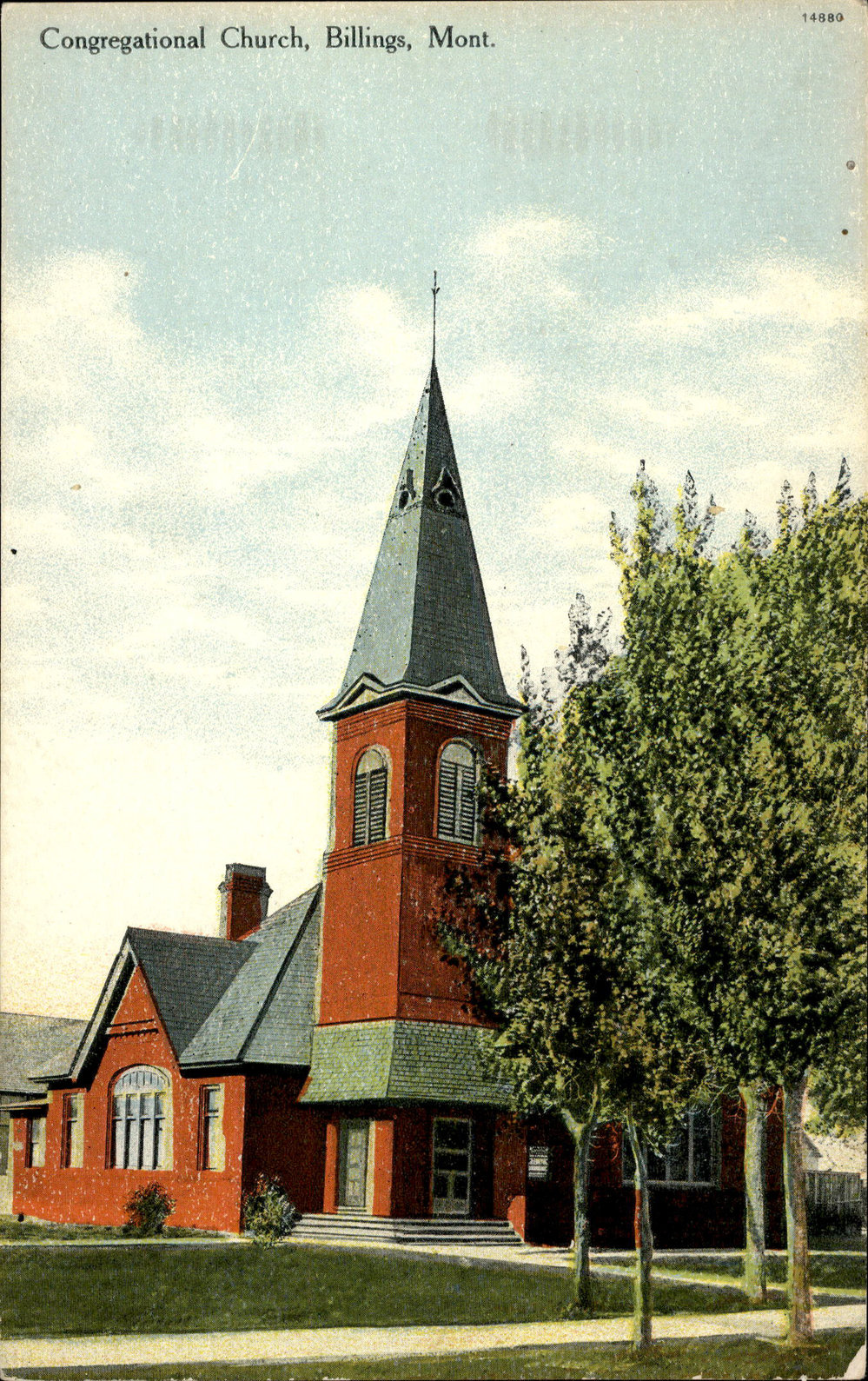
Postcard of the 1883 building

For its first two months, the fledgling congregation met at various locations, including an unfinished saloon and a bakery. Land for a building, located at the northwest corner of N. 27th Street and 3rd Avenue North, was donated by the Montana & Minnesota Land Company. The church trustees built a small frame building to serve as a temporary church, with a lean-to on the back for the pastor's residence. Railroad magnate Frederick Billings—along with his wife, Julia—donated $12,000 towards the construction of a permanent brick church on the same site. During its construction, Shuart resigned due to health issues; he remained in Billings to pursue business enterprises, including acting as an agent for Frederick Billings and the land company. Shuart was succeeded by A. Stryker Wallace, who would serve the church until 1891.

The church building, designed by Plant & Whitney and topped by an 83-foot steeple, was dedicated on November 18, 1893. In the church's early days, intoxicated cowboys would attempt to shoot the steeple's weathervane while riding by on their horses.

First Congregational was an early hub for initial Christian activity in the young city. The Methodist and Episcopal denominations began organizing in Billings in 1882, with both assembling at the Congregational church early on. (The Methodist meetings were led by William Wesley Van Orsdel, a prominent circuit rider.) The Methodists and Episcopalians would both erect their own dedicated churches in 1886. The first Roman Catholic mass in the city was held at First Congregational in 1883; St. Joaquim's Catholic Church was built in 1887.

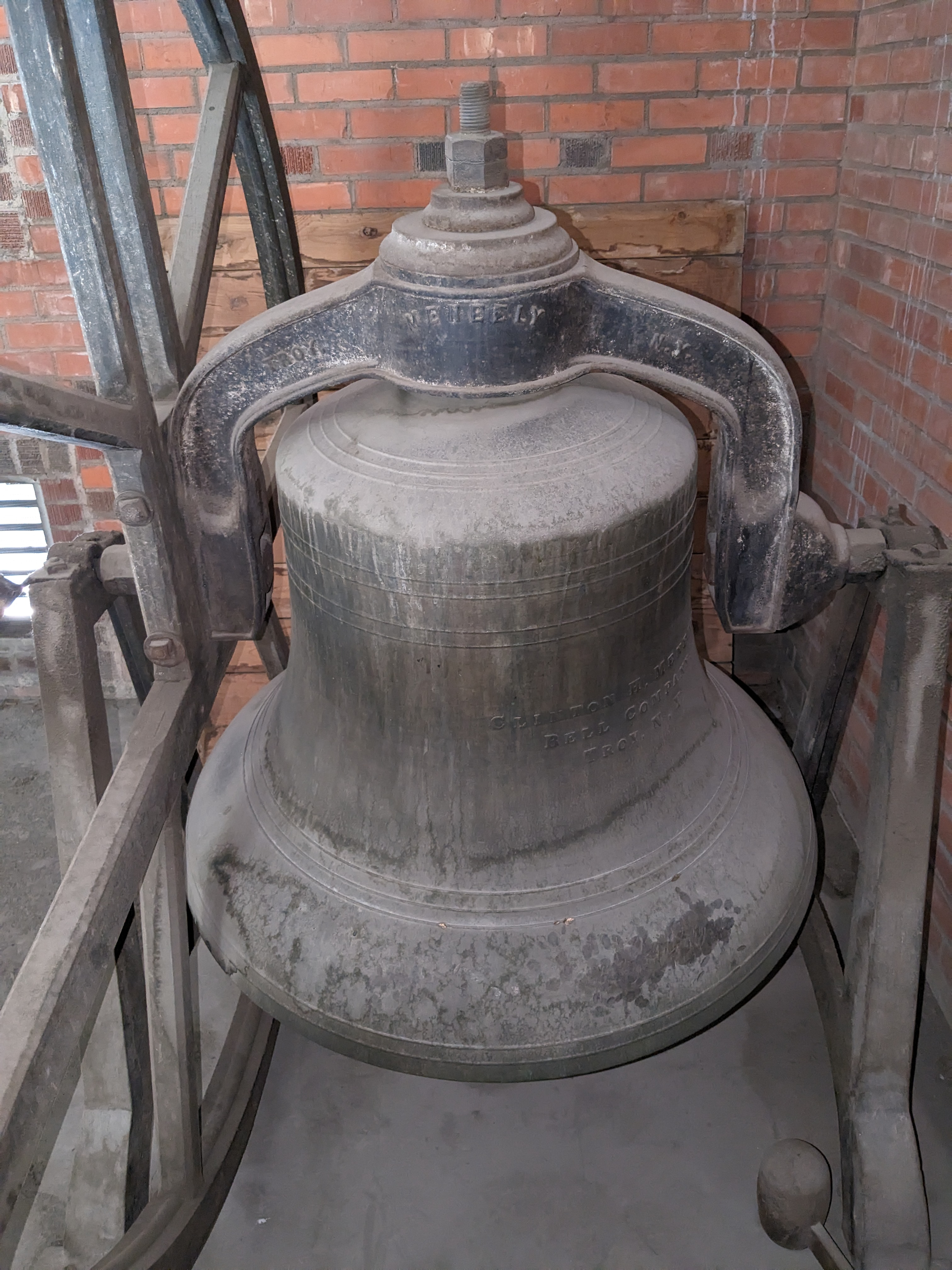
1889 Meneely bell

In 1916, First Congregational chartered Boy Scout Troop 2. The troop eventually became the oldest scout troop in the state, celebrating its centennial anniversary in 2016.

The church added a Parish Wing, designed by McIver & Cohagen, on the north side of the building in 1927. The sanctuary was extended eastward, adding a balcony. Plans for further construction were laid aside because of the onset of the Great Depression.

=== 1950–2000 ===
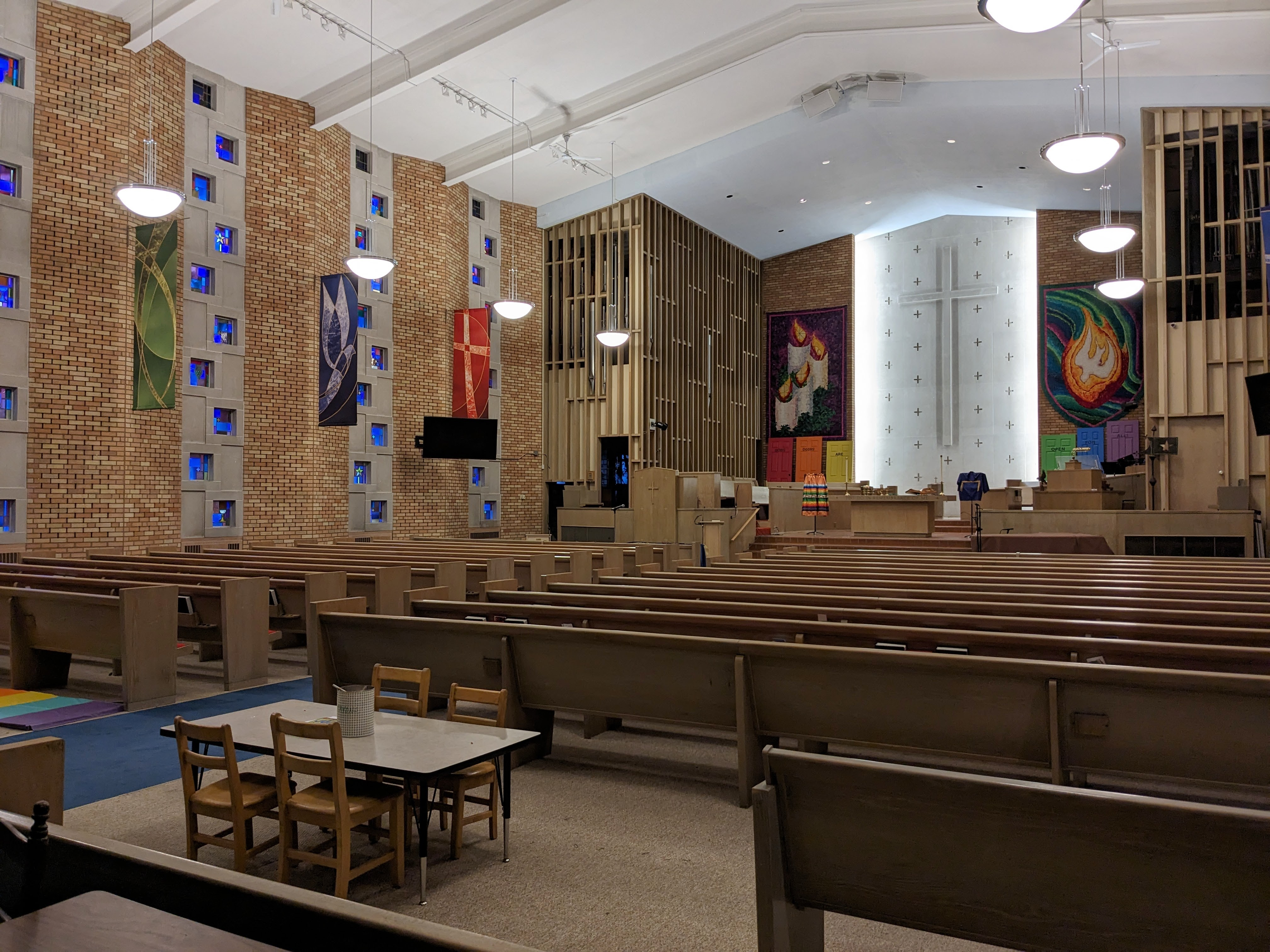
Current sanctuary, 2024

When the church's membership swelled following World War II, an Education Wing was added to the rear of the building in 1951. Meanwhile, the congregation had long outgrown the original 1883 sanctuary. The old church was torn down in 1956 to make way for a new building designed by Orr Pickering Associates. Dedicated on November 3, 1957, this new building became known among Montana Congregationalists as the conference's de facto "cathedral church." Features retained from the old building included the 1889 Clinton H. Meneely bell and a stained glass window designed after a J. K. Ralston painting.

In 1960, First Congregational's burgeoning membership during the midcentury period necessitated the creation of a new church on Billings' west end. The new Mayflower Congregational Church initially met at Rocky Mountain College before completing its own dedicated building in 1962. The steeple from First Congregational's former building was moved to Mayflower to serve as a belltower. It remains as one of the oldest structures in Billings.

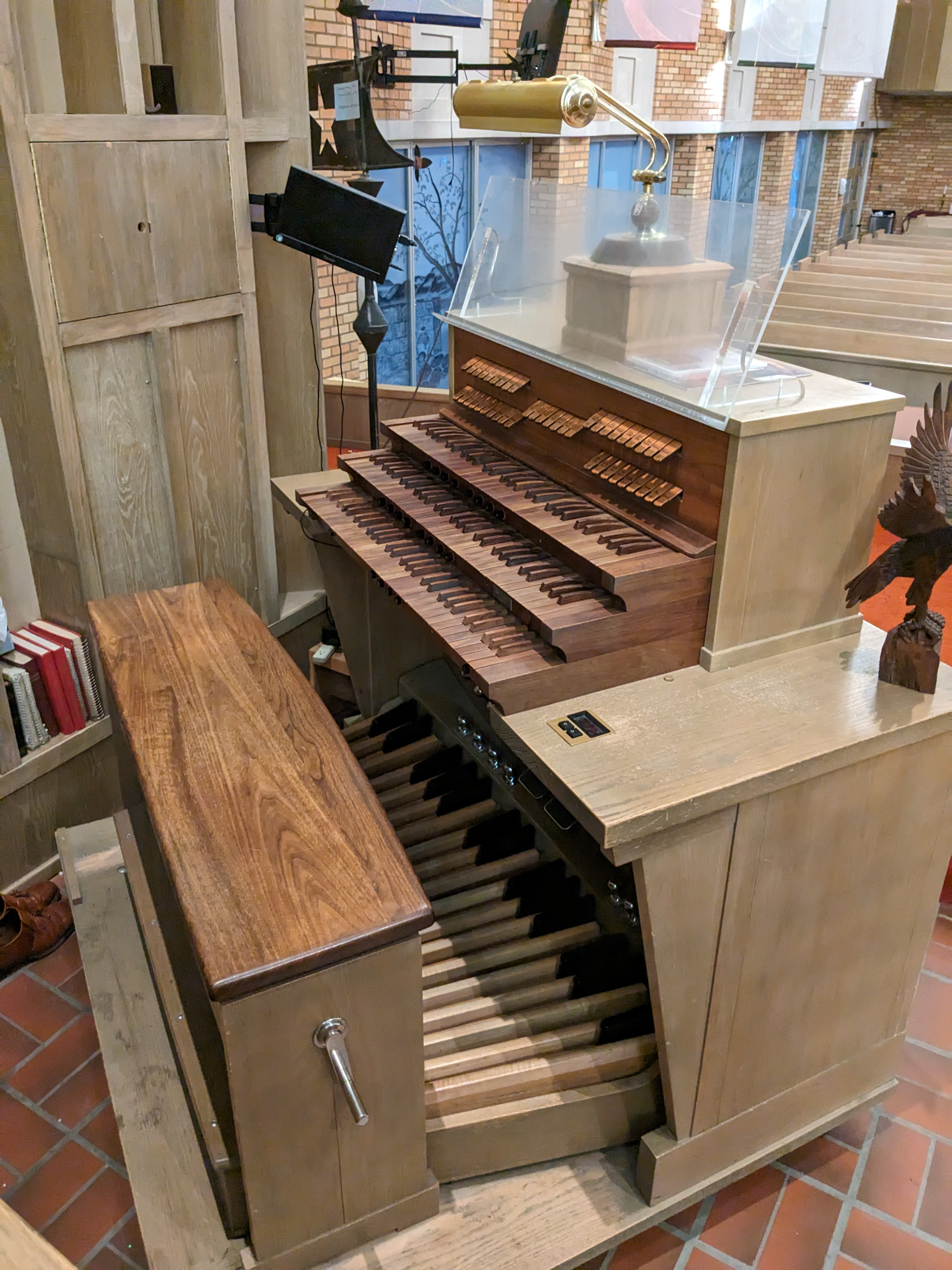
Organ console

The Holtkamp Organ Company built a new 30-rank pipe organ for First Congregational in 1972, replacing an earlier M. P. Moller instrument. The organ was expanded to 44 ranks in 1982. With 2,326 pipes, it is the largest pipe organ in Montana.

In 1993, a brick was thrown through the window of the Schnitzer family of Billings, who had placed a menorah in their window. Montana Association of Churches executive director Margaret MacDonald, a member of First Congregational, contacted minister Keith Torney with the idea of creating paper menorahs as a sign of solidarity. Members of First Congregational and other churches displayed the paper menorahs; soon after, the Billings Gazette printed a full-size menorah in its pages for readers to cut out for their own windows. This event was the impetus for the Not in Our Town project.

=== 2000–present ===
As of the 2020s, the church building is increasingly used for community initiatives and events. These include Alcoholics Anonymous meetings and the recording sessions for a Native podcast about addiction recovery, Unspoken Words. An LGBTQ+ resource center, operated by 406 Pride, is located in the church. In the winter of 2022–2023, First Congregational hosted a low-barrier shelter for community members experiencing homelessness.

In 2024, the church was awarded a matching grant of $250,000 from the National Fund for Sacred Spaces, a program affiliated with the National Trust for Historic Preservation. The grant will fund improvements to the building's safety and serviceability, including accessibility upgrades, asbestos remediation, and updates to HVAC and electrical systems.
