= Haugsjaa =

Haugsjaa is a surname. Notable people with the surname include:

- Ansel Haugsjaa (born 2004), American luger
- Knute Haugsjaa (1915–1959), American architect
