= Oliver Building =

Oliver Building may refer to

- Oliver Building (Chicago), headquarters of the Oliver Typewriter Company
- Oliver Building (Pittsburgh), a skyscraper also known as the Henry W. Oliver building
- Oliver Building (Billings, Montana), listed on the National Register of Historic Places listings in Yellowstone County, Montana
