= William Hess =

William Hess may refer to:

- Willy Hess (violinist) (1859–1939), violin virtuoso and violin teacher
- Willy Hess (composer) (1906–1997), Swiss musicologist, composer, and Beethoven scholar
- William E. Hess (1898–1986), U.S. representative
- Bill Hess (1923–1978), head coach
- William J. Hess (died 1988), American architect
- William M. Hess (1928-2017), American chemist known for contributions to characterization of carbon black dispersion in rubber
