= L and L Building =

- U.S. National Register of Historic Places
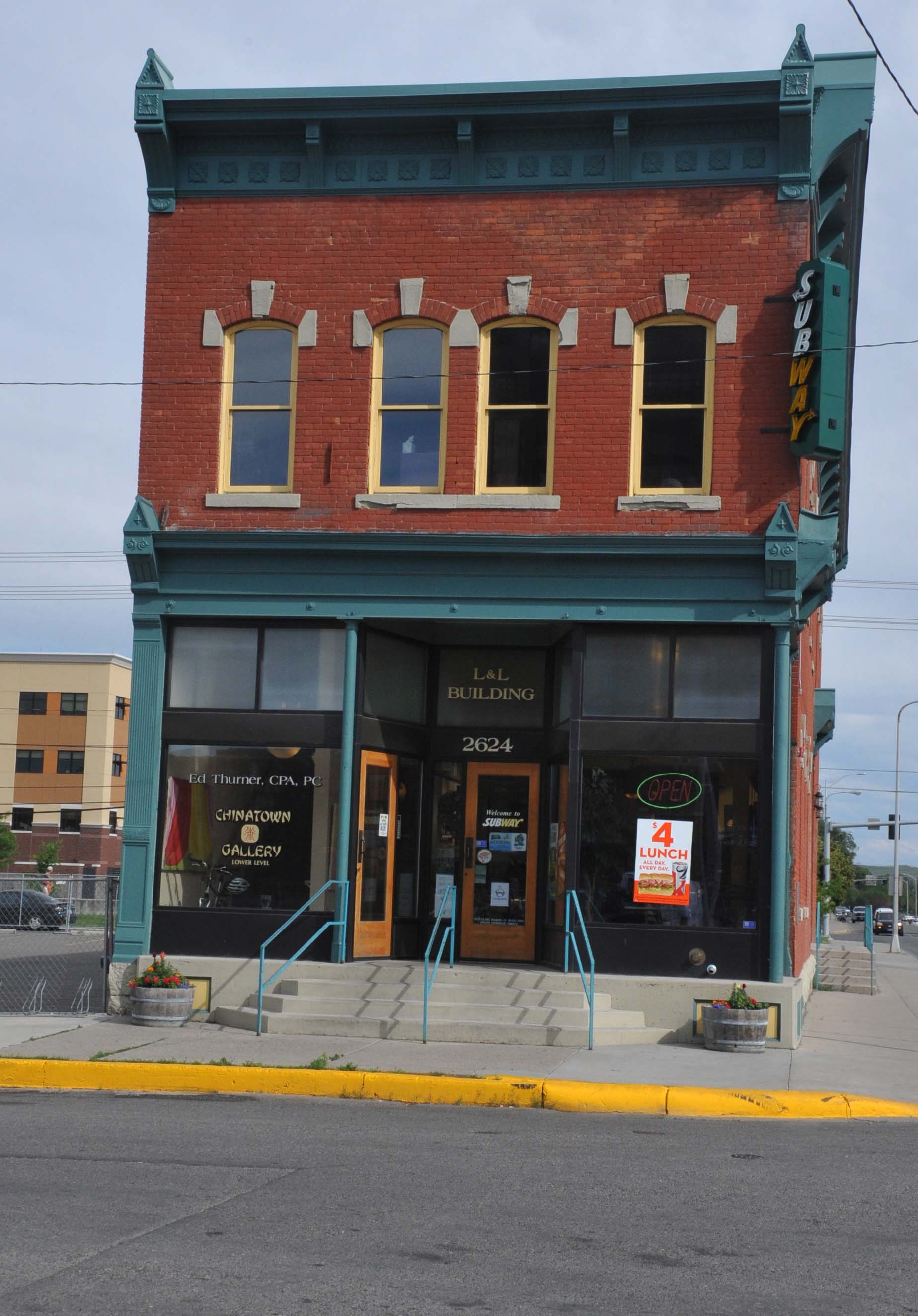
- The building in 2013

- Location within Montana Location within the United States
- Location: 2624 Minnesota Avenue, Billings, Montana
- Coordinates: 45°46′53″N 108°30′07″W
- Area: less than one acre
- Built: 1893
- Architectural style: Italianate
- NRHP reference No.: 08001227
- Added to NRHP: December 19, 2008

The L and L Building is a historic two-story building in Billings, Montana. It was designed in the Italianate style, and built in 1893-1896 by Sam and Yee Quong Lee, two brothers who were born in China and emigrated to the United States in 1865. It housed a dry goods store, a restaurant, and a lodging house until the late 1910s, when the first floor was remodelled as a saloon and a liquor store. It later housed the Arcade Bar, which became known as "an eyesore and a gathering spot for the city's criminal underbelly," The bar closed temporarily after it was raided by the police, who arrested a bartender and two customers on marijuana charges in January 1993, and it closed down in May 1994. The building was refurbished in 2004–2006. It has been listed on the National Register of Historic Places since December 19, 2008.
