= Walter V. Marshall =

American architect

Walter Vancleve Marshall
- Born: March 20, 1890; Helena, Montana, U.S.
- Died: June 10, 1967 (aged 77); Dearborn, Michigan, U.S.
- Resting place: Ann Arbor, Michigan, U.S.
- Education: University of Michigan
- Occupations: Architect, professor

Walter V. Marshall (March 20, 1890 - June 10, 1967) was an American architect and university administrator.

== Life ==
Marshall was born on March 20, 1890, in Helena, Montana. He grew up in Great Falls, Montana from the age of 10, and he graduated from the University of Michigan in 1915.

Marshall co-founded the firm of McIver, Cohagen and Marshall with Angus V. McIver and Chandler C. Cohagen in 1915, and they designed many buildings in Great Falls, Montana. He taught at his alma mater, the University of Michigan, from 1925 to 1960, when he retired as Assistant Dean of the College of Architecture and Design.

Marshall died on June 10, 1967, in Dearborn, Michigan. He was buried in Ann Arbor.
