= Acme Building =

- U.S. National Register of Historic Places
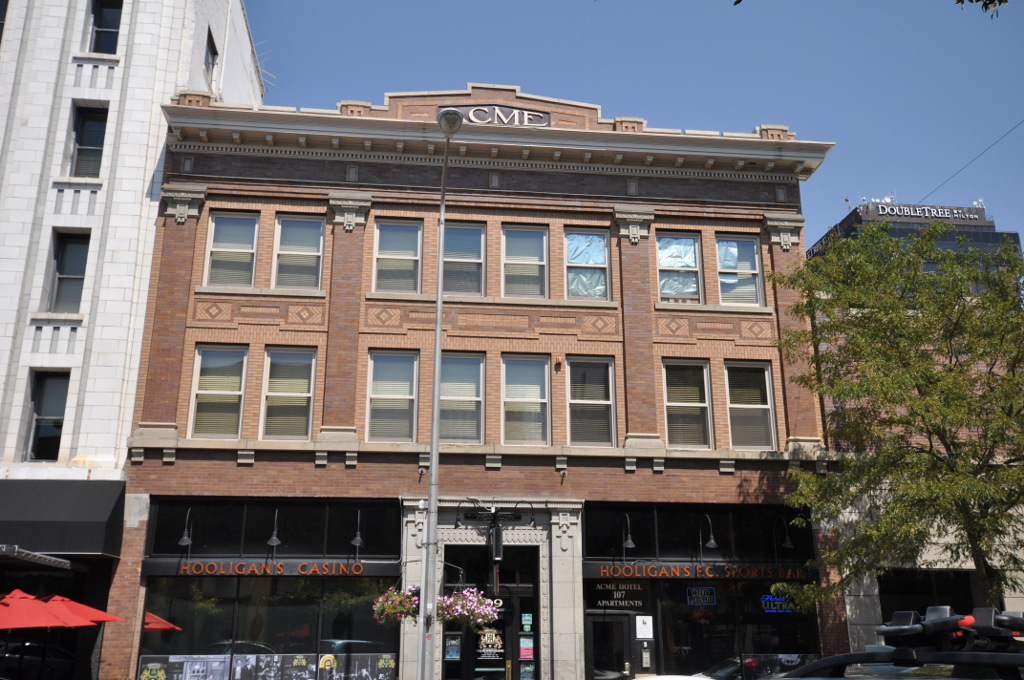
- The building in 2017

- Location within Montana Location within the United States
- Location: 109-111 North Broadway, Billings, Montana
- Coordinates: 45°46′59″N 108°30′14″W
- Area: less than one acre
- Architectural style: Western Commercial, Neoclassical, Craftsman
- NRHP reference No.: 05001279
- Added to NRHP: November 9, 2005

The Acme Building is a historic three-story building in Billings, Montana. It was designed in the Western Commercial style with Classical Revival and American Craftsman features on the facade, and built in 1911-1912. It was known as the Acme Theater in 1912 and the Broadway Theater from 1912 to 1916, followed by the Regent Theater until the 1930s. It has been listed on the National Register of Historic Places since November 9, 2005.
