= Montana Governor's Residence =

Historic house in Montana, United States

- Former Montana Executive Mansion
- U.S. National Register of Historic Places
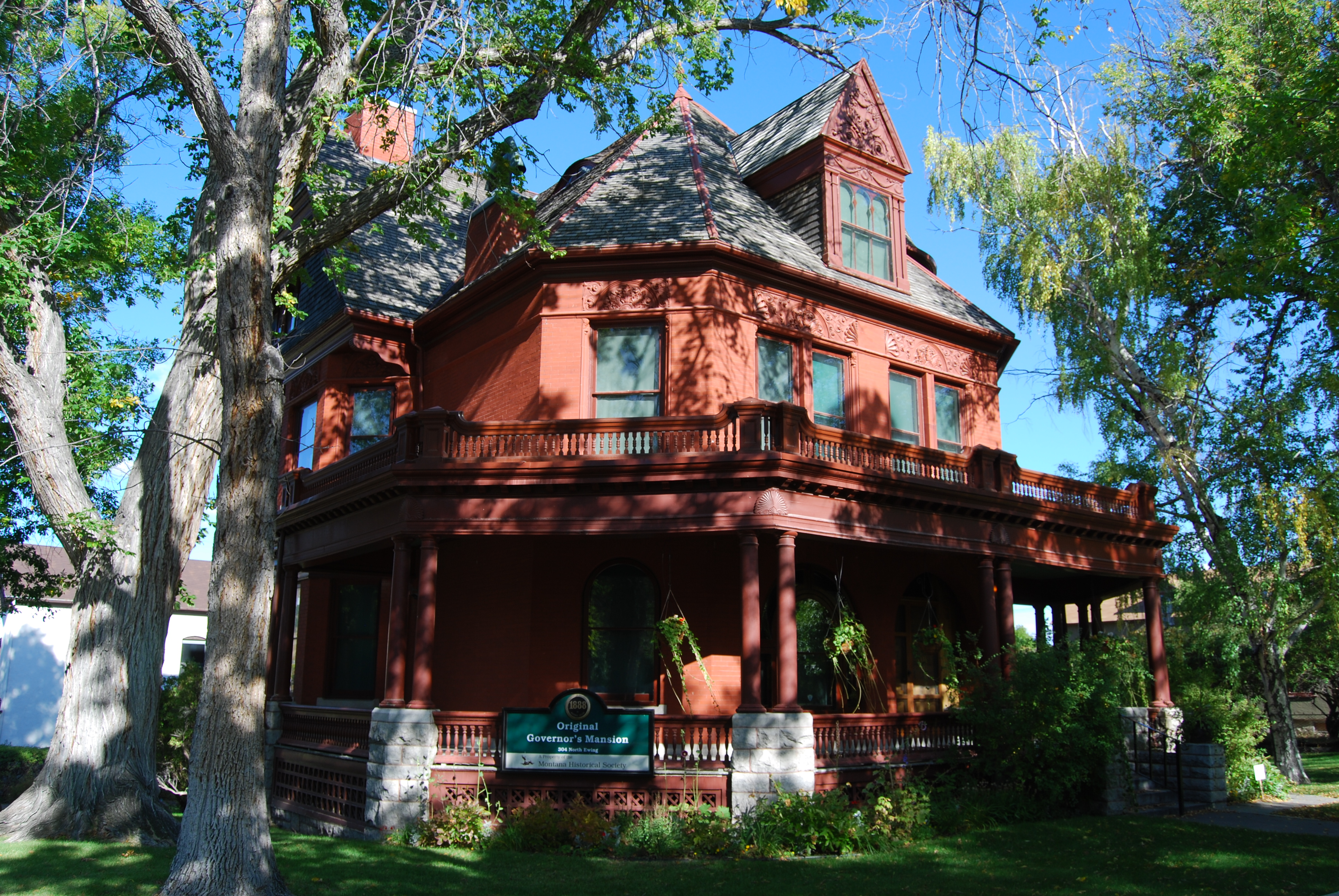

- Location within Montana Location within the United States
- Interactive map of Former Montana Executive Mansion
- Location: 304 N Ewing St, Helena, Montana
- Coordinates: 46°35′16.2″N 112°02′06.5″W
- Area: 1 acre (0.40 ha)
- Built: 1888
- Architect: Hodgson, Stem, & Welter
- Architectural style: Queen Anne
- NRHP reference No.: 70000357
- Added to NRHP: April 28, 1970

The Former Montana Executive Mansion, also known as the Original Governor's Mansion, was built in 1888. Between 1913 and 1959, it served as the official residence of the governor of Montana. It is located in Helena, the capital of Montana. It was listed on the National Register of Historic Places in 1970.

== Original mansion ==
The house was originally built in 1888 by William Chessman. In 1913, the state of Montana acquired the building to serve as the official residence for the governor of Montana. It served this role until 1959, and was home to nine governors and their families.

It was originally known as the William Chessman Mansion, and after 1959 was referred to as the Governor's Old Mansion.. It is in Queen Anne style and was designed by the St. Paul, Minnesota, firm of Hodgson, Stem, & Welter. It is three stories and built of pressed brick, terracotta and stone. The interior has seven fireplaces and 20 rooms.

Said to have cost $85,000 to build, the NRHP listing includes two contributing buildings still standing, the house and a two-story brick carriage house, on an area of 1 acre (0.40 ha).

== Current residence ==
The current Montana Governor's Residence is located at 2 Carson Street in Helena, Montana (46.5845°N 112.0126°W). It began operation as the governor's residence in 1959, replacing the original governor's mansion. The residence is a two-level steel and brick house located two blocks from the Montana State Capitol building. It was designed by architect Chandler C. Cohagen.

== Sources ==
- Original Governor's Mansion Self-Guided Tour
