= Austin North House =

Historic house in Montana, United States

- U.S. National Register of Historic Places
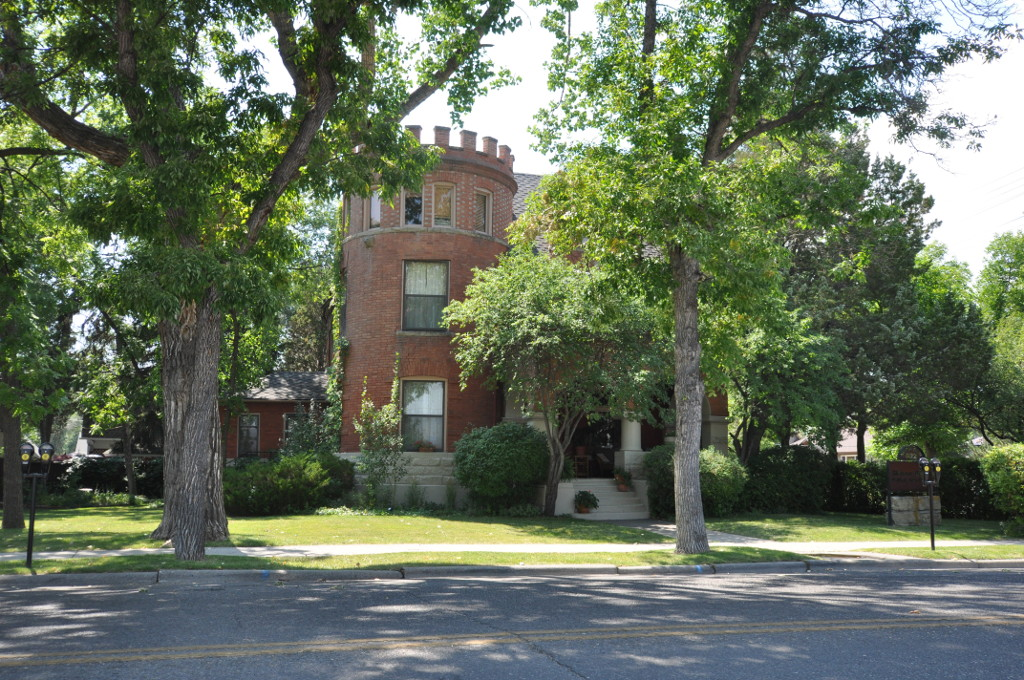
- The house in 2017

- Location within Montana Location within the United States
- Location: 622 North 29th Street, Billings, Montana
- Coordinates: 45°47′10.7″N 108°30′43.8″W
- Area: 0.5 acres (0.20 ha)
- Built: 1902
- Architect: Link & Haire
- Architectural style: Medieval style
- NRHP reference No.: 77000822
- Added to NRHP: November 23, 1977

The Austin North House, also known as The Castle, is a historic house in Billings, Montana. It was built in 1902-1903 for Austin North, his wife née Hattie Swartz, and their five children. North was a native of Iowa and he split his time between Billings and San Antonio, Texas. He was the president of the North Real Estate Investment Company, a real estate, mortgage and insurance company. He died in 1928. By the 1970s, the house was in mixed use, with stores on the first floor and residential apartments on the upper floors.

The house was designed in the Medieval style by Link & Haire, a prolific Montana-based architectural firm. It has been listed on the National Register of Historic Places since November 23, 1977.
