= Prescott Commons =

- U.S. National Register of Historic Places
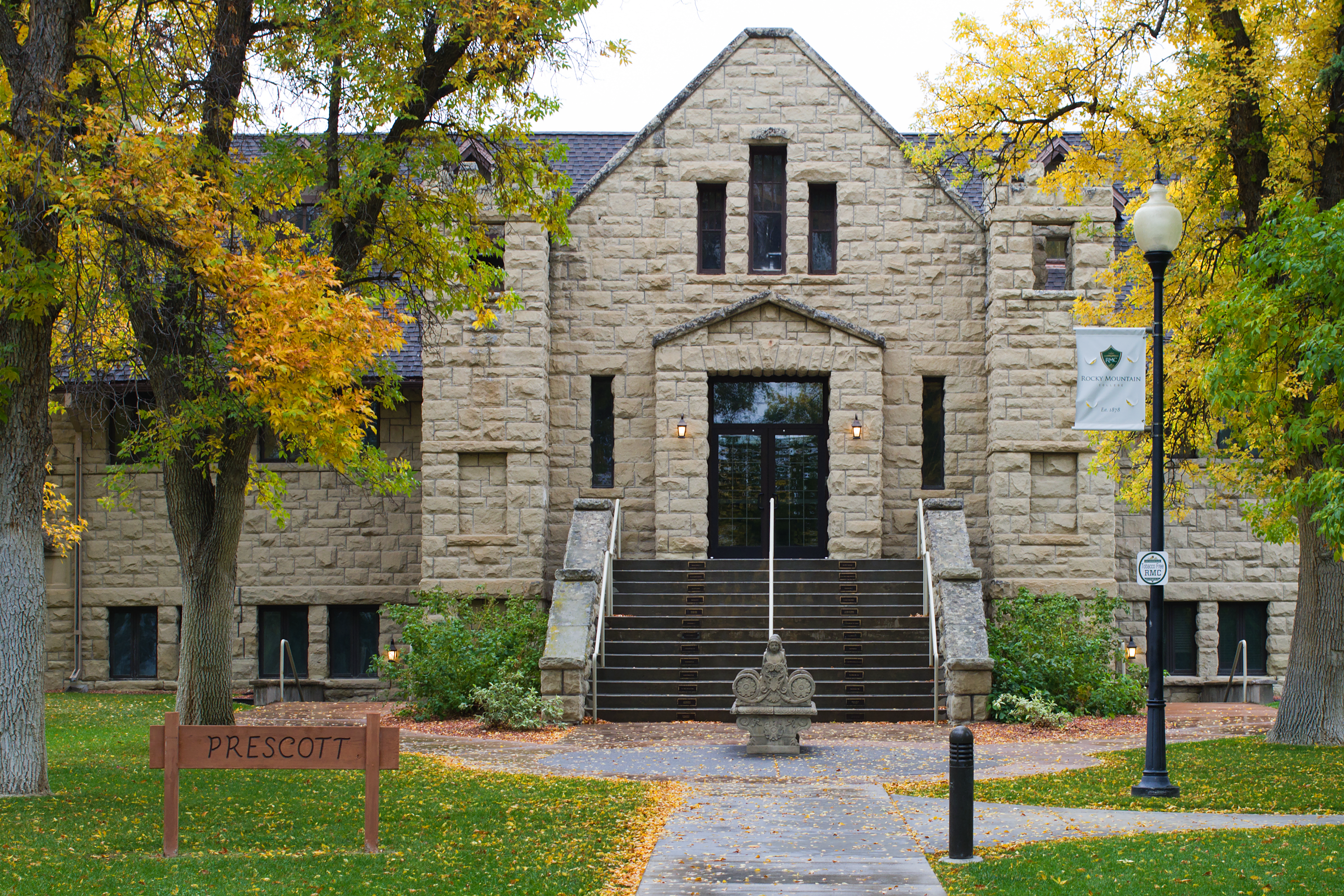
- The building in 2016

- Location within Montana Location within the United States
- Location: Rimrock Road, Billings, Montana
- Coordinates: 45°47′52″N 108°33′08″W
- Area: less than one acre
- Built: 1915
- Architect: Wallace H. Comstock
- Architectural style: Late Gothic Revival, Tudor Revival, Tudor Gothic
- NRHP reference No.: 82003182
- Added to NRHP: April 30, 1982

Prescott Commons is a historic building on the campus of Rocky Mountain College in Billings, Montana. It was designed in the Tudor Revival style by Wallace H. Comstock, and built in 1915–1916 thanks in part to a donation from Amos L. Prescott, a financier from New York. It has been listed on the National Register of Historic Places since April 30, 1982.
