= Montana Veterans and Pioneers Memorial Building =

- U.S. National Register of Historic Places
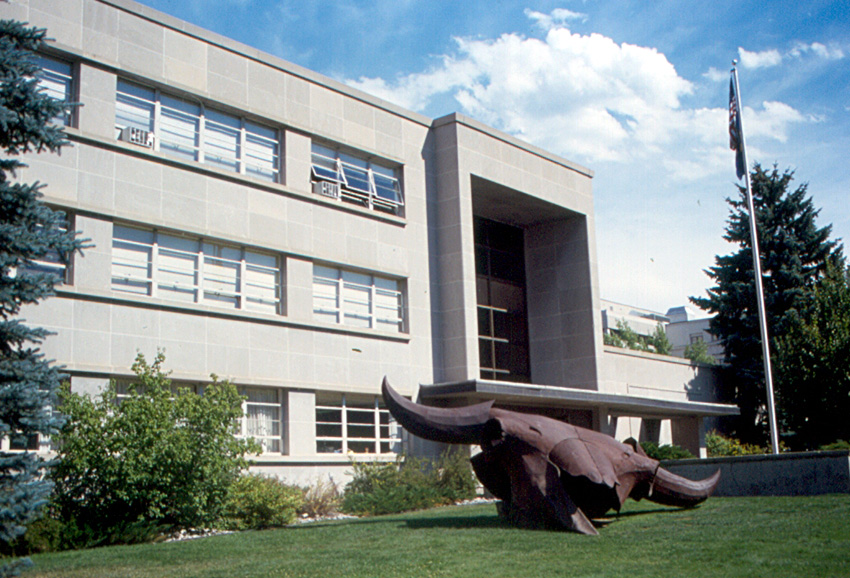

- Location within Montana Location within the United States
- Location: 225 North Roberts, Helena, Montana
- Coordinates: 46°35′11″N 112°0′55″W
- Area: 2 acres (0.81 ha)
- Built: 1953
- Built by: Carson Construction Company
- Architect: Angus Vaughn McIver
- Architectural style: Modern Movement
- NRHP reference No.: 04001357
- Added to NRHP: December 15, 2004

The Montana Veterans and Pioneers Memorial Building, at 225 North Roberts in Helena, Montana is the Modern Movement-style headquarters of the Montana Historical Society. It was built in 1953 and was listed on the National Register of Historic Places in 2004.

The design of Great Falls architect Angus Vaughn McIver won the architectural design contest. It was built by Carson Construction Company.
