= Hesper, Montana =

- Unincorporated community
- Location within Montana Location within the United States
- Coordinates: 45°44′30″N 108°42′31″W
- Country: United States
- State: Montana
- County: Yellowstone
- Elevation: 3,327 ft (1,014 m)

Population (2010)
  - Total: N/A
- Time zone: UTC-7 (Mountain (MST))
  - Summer (DST): UTC-6 (MDT)
- ZIP code: 59106
- Area code: 406
- GNIS feature ID: 772359

Hesper is an unincorporated community in western Yellowstone County, Montana, United States. It is located northeast of Laurel and west of Billings. Hesper appears on the Mossmain U.S. Geological Survey Map.

== History ==
Hesper was established in 1917. The name Hesper or Hesperus, is the evening star, and according to old mythology, the king of the western land. The name has Masonic roots. The community is named after the Hesper Farm, which was named by Benjamin F. Shuart, who operated it for Frederick H. Billings after resigning from the pastorate of Billings First Congregational Church. Frederick Billings later sold the farm to I. D. O'Donnell, a prominent agriculturalist and businessman. It was at Hesper Farm that O'Donnell planted and produced the first alfalfa crop in Montana.

In its heyday, the depot in Hesper served as a hub for surrounding farms and ranchers in the area. However, by the 1940s the town began to lose importance and declined.

Most of the original township itself is no longer in use, with many of the original structures leveled or abandoned. The community is home to the Yellowstone Boys and Girls Ranch and is now considered a subdivision of the Billings metropolitan area.

The former Hesper School District is currently the Elder Grove Elementary School District, serving grades kindergarten through eight.
