= William J. Hess =

American architect

William James Hess
- Born: October 21, 1914; Teton County, Montana, US
- Died: January 25, 1988 (aged 73); Great Falls, Montana, US
- Education: Montana State University
- Occupation: Architect

William J. Hess (1914-1988) was an American architect who designed many buildings in the state of Montana. He was elected as the president of the Montana chapter of the American Institute of Architects in 1954.

== Life and career ==
William James Hess was born October 21, 1914, in rural Teton County, Montana. He attended the Bozeman schools and graduated from the architecture school of the Montana State College in 1937. After two years with architect Chandler C. Cohagen, he joined Angus V. McIver of Great Falls as a draftsman and engineer in 1939. In 1942 he left to work for Boeing in Seattle as an engineer, returning to McIver in 1946 as his chief draftsman. In 1950 McIver formed a partnership with Hess and his chief designer, Knute Haugsjaa, to form the firm of A. V. McIver & Associates, which became McIver, Hess & Haugsjaa in 1953. Haugsjaa died in 1959, and the remaining partners continued as McIver & Hess. In 1969 McIver retired, and Hess reorganized the firm as Hess, Gillis & Vigesaa with new partners.

Hess died January 25, 1988, in Great Falls at the age of 73.
