= I. D. O'Donnell =

American agriculturalist and businessman (1860–1948)

Ignatius Daniel O'Donnell
- Born: 1860; Norfolk, Ontario
- Died: 1948 (aged 87–88); Billings, Montana
- Resting place: Mountview Cemetery, Billings, Montana, U.S.
- Occupations: Agriculturalist, businessman
- Spouse: Louise Roeser
- Children: 6

Ignatius Daniel O'Donnell (1860–1948), better known as I. D. O'Donnell, was an agriculturalist and businessman in Billings, Montana. He attracted national attention for promoting efficiencies in irrigation and agriculture. In 1919, O'Donnell was recognized by The Country Gentleman as "The Best Farmer in Montana."

== Biography ==
Ignatius Daniel O'Donnell was born in Norfolk, Ontario, in 1860. His parents were of Scots-Irish descent. After spending his childhood in Saginaw, Michigan, O'Donnell was an early settler in the Billings area, arriving in 1882 and working as a ranch foreman for Frederick Billings.

O'Donnell earned national recognition for his innovations in irrigation and agricultural efficiency, largely based on his own experiences at his farm at Hesper, Montana. He cultivated the first successful sugar beet and alfalfa crops in the state. Realizing both crops required irrigation to be successful, he worked with other local businessmen to build irrigation ditches throughout the Billings area. These included the Billings Bench Water Association Canal and culminated in the Huntley Project, built by the United States Reclamation Service.

From 1913 to 1918, O'Donnell joined the Reclamation Service as its Supervisor of Irrigation, a position he embraced as a platform to promote successful farming and irrigation techniques on a national stage. O'Donnell conducted regular site visits to federal irrigation projects, met with farmers, promoted efficient methods and alfalfa farming, and contributed articles to Reclamation Service publications. After resigning from the position, O'Donnell continues to advocate for irrigation and diversified farming techniques, working for a time as an agricultural specialist for the Great Northern Railway.

Among his civic accomplishments, O'Donnell served as a founding board member for the Billings Polytechnic Institute and the Parmly Billings Memorial Library, remaining on the latter for 44 years. He served as the director of the Commercial Club and the board president of the Yellowstone County Fair, and was appointed to several state-level boards and councils. He acquired the historic Boothill Cemetery in the 1920s and spearheaded the preservation of the site, building a stone obelisk and conducting research on the history of the cemetery's burials. He would later gift the cemetery to the City of Billings to preserve it as a park.

== Legacy ==
I. D. O'Donnell House, 2024

As observed by Montana historian Carroll Van West in 2002, I. D. O'Donnell was, by that time, "mostly forgotten even in his home of Yellowstone County." However, O'Donnell and his contributions to Montana were more widely recognized in the 21st century. He was inducted into the Montana Cowboy Hall of Fame in 2018, and recognized as a member of the Gallery of Outstanding Montanans by the Montana Historical Society. The Western Heritage Center hosted a lecture on O'Donnell in 2026.

The O'Donnell family home in Billings is listed on the National Register of Historic Places. It is near the home of Preston B. Moss, one of O'Donnell's closest business associates.

== Publications ==
- O'Donnell, I. D. (1918). Better business. Better farming. Better living. Hints from a practical farmer to the settlers on the projects of the United States Reclamation service. Washington: Government Printing Office.
- O'Donnell, I. D. (1984). Montana Monographs. Yellowstone Historical Society.
