= Knute Haugsjaa =

American architect

- Born: December 29, 1915; Pekin, North Dakota, US
- Died: March 20, 1959 (aged 43); Great Falls, Montana, US
- Occupation: Architect
- Spouse: Eleanor Haugsjaa
- Children: 4

Knute Haugsjaa (1915-1959) was an American architect who designed several buildings in the state of Montana.

== Life and career ==
Knute Haugsjaa was born December 29, 1915, in Pekin, North Dakota. He was educated in the local schools and at the North Dakota Agricultural College, graduating in 1939. Haugsjaa then joined the office of Great Falls architect Angus V. McIver, one of the leading architects in the state. In 1941 he went to work for the McNeil Construction Company of Los Angeles and Las Vegas, and in 1943 joined Boeing in Seattle as a factory and hangar designer. Concurrent with his time with Boeing he served in the United States Coast Guard Reserve. In 1945 Haugsjaa returned to Montana, rejoining McIver as chief designer. In 1950 McIver formed a partnership with Haugsjaa and his chief draftsman, William J. Hess, to form the firm of A. V. McIver & Associates, which became McIver, Hess & Haugsjaa in 1953. This firm lasted until Haugsjaa's death, which occurred on March 20, 1959.
