= William Wesley Van Orsdel =

American Methodist reverend (1848-1919)

Reverend William Wesley Van Orsdel
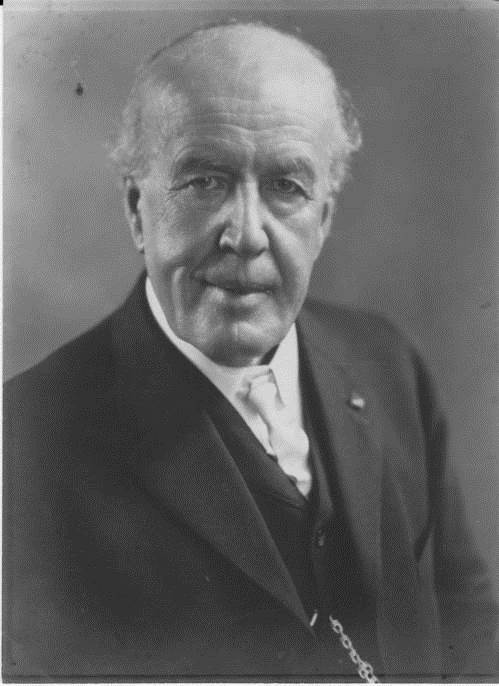
- Born: March 20, 1848; Hunterstown, Pennsylvania, U.S.
- Died: December 19, 1919 (aged 71); Great Falls, Montana
- Church: Methodist Episcopal Church

Rev. William Wesley Van Orsdel (March 20, 1848 – December 19, 1919), or "Brother Van", was a Methodist circuit rider in Montana who made a significant contribution to the spread of Methodism in Montana and to the early development of the state's public institutions. Throughout his career, Brother Van founded churches, universities, and hospitals; he converted and ministered to homesteaders, miners, and Native Americans; he worked with the elites and the poor, the famous (C.M. Russell counted Brother Van among his friends) and the forgotten in a career that spanned nearly fifty years.

== Life ==
=== Early life ===
Van Orsdel was born in Hunterstown, Pennsylvania, on March 20, 1848. He arrived in Fort Benton, Montana by steamboat in 1872. Initially, he sought to work among the new cowboys that were exploiting with cattle the open grass ranges left after the decimation of the vast buffalo herds. Van Orsdel traveled by horse from cow-camp to cow-camp spreading the gospel and baptizing the young cow hands. Artist Charles Marion Russell remembered those early years when he first met Brother Van at a ranch in the Judith Basin in central Montana, "These men who knew little law, and one of them I knew wore notches in his gun, men who had not prayed since they knelt at their mother's knees, bowed their heads while you, Brother Van, gave thanks."

As the Native American population lost control of their lands and Montana was settled by white migrants, Van Orsdel began to minister to homesteaders and the larger communities that supported them in Great Falls and Helena, Montana.

=== Public institutions ===
Van Orsdel founded over one hundred churches in northern and central Montana, but his greatest contribution was the establishment of public institutions including hospitals and universities. He was influential in the founding of hospitals in Great Falls and Bozeman, Montana. In 1890, with Van Orsdel's leadership, the Methodist church established Montana Wesleyan University in the Prickly Pear Valley near Helena. After that institution moved to downtown Helena, Van Orsdel facilitated the conversion of the abandoned campus into a school. With a staff of deaconesses trained at the Chicago Training School for Home and Foreign Missions, the Montana Deaconess Preparatory School opened in 1909. The school's name changed several times over the years, and today it is known as Intermountain.

Van Orsdel was also influential in the establishment of present-day Rocky Mountain College, one of the first institutions of higher learning in the state.

He died in Great Falls, Montana, on December 19, 1919. He is buried at Forrestvale Cemetery in Helena, Montana.
