= Glacier County Courthouse =

- U.S. National Register of Historic Places
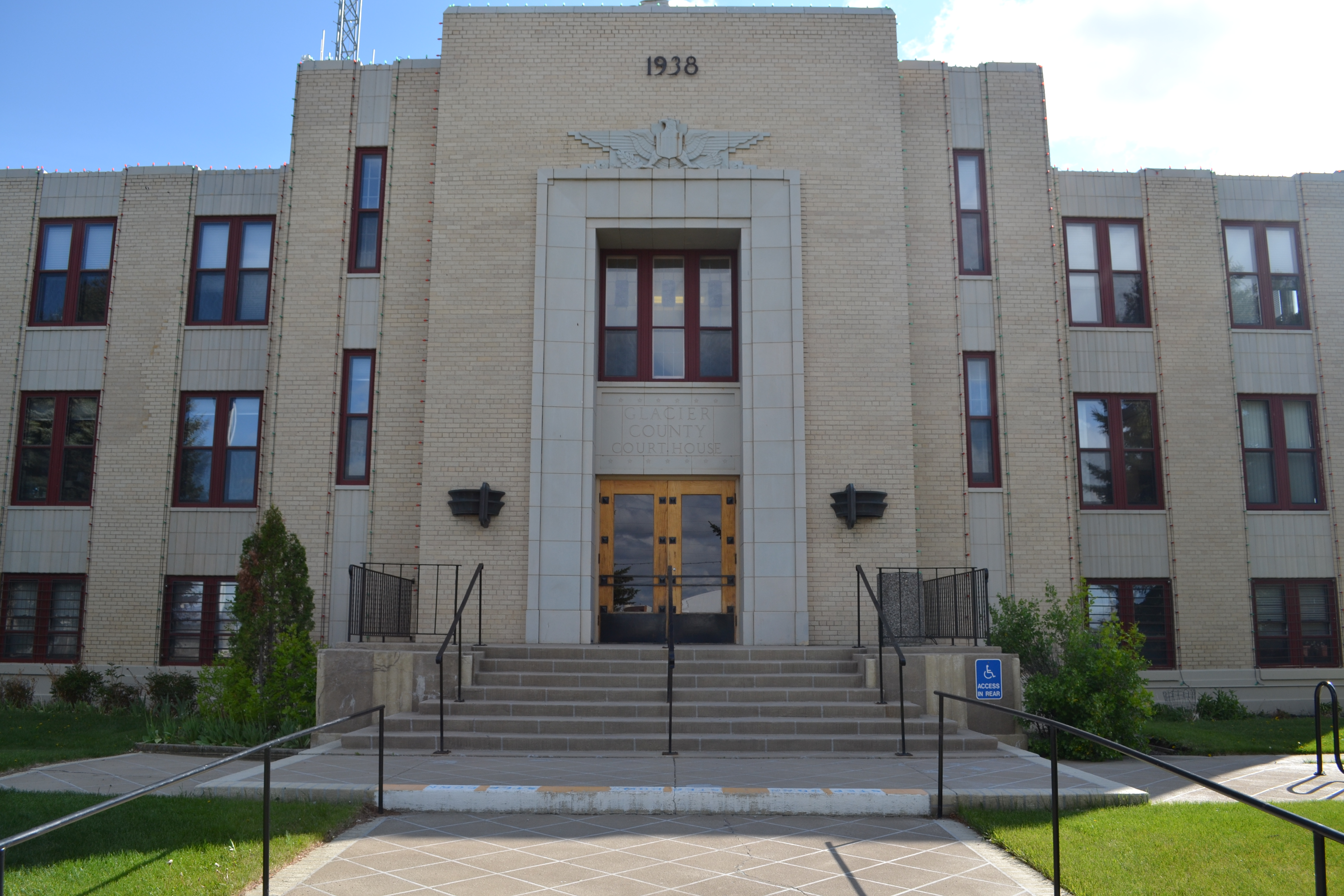

- Location within Montana Location within the United States
- Interactive map showing the location of Glacier County Courthouse
- Location: 512 East Main Street, Cut Bank, Montana
- Coordinates: 48.63237°N 112.32639°W
- Built by: Angus McIver
- Architectural style: PWA Moderne
- NRHP reference No.: 13000446
- Added to NRHP: June 25, 2013

Glacier County Courthouse, a PWA Moderne-style courthouse at Cut Bank in Glacier County, Montana, was listed on the National Register of Historic Places in 2013.

It was built in 1938-1939 during an economic boom in Glacier County, while the Great Depression was going on in the rest of the nation, as the "Santa Rita Strip" provided oil boom jobs and optimism.
