= Oliver Building (Billings, Montana) =

- U.S. National Register of Historic Places
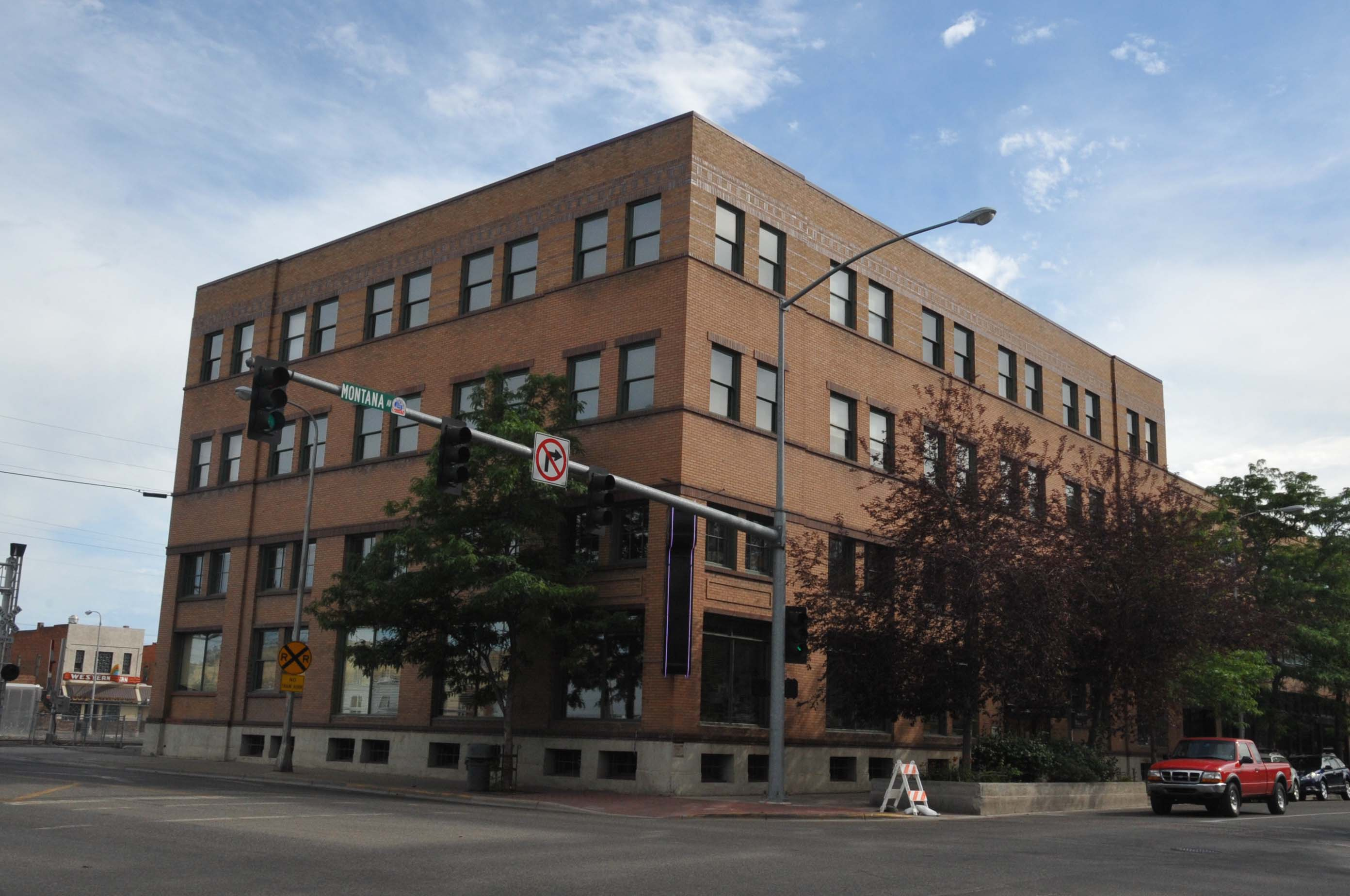
- The building in 2013

- Location within Montana Location within the United States
- Location: 2702 Montana Avenue, Billings, Montana
- Coordinates: 45°46′53″N 108°30′11″W
- Area: less than one acre
- Built: 1910
- Architect: Chandler C. Cohagen
- Architectural style: Chicago, Art Deco, Moderne
- NRHP reference No.: 08001228
- Added to NRHP: December 19, 2008

The Oliver Building is a historic building in Billings, Montana. It was built in 1910 as a warehouse for Oliver Chilled Plow Works, a manufacturer of tractors and plows. It was remodelled by architect Chandler C. Cohagen in 1930. It has been listed on the National Register of Historic Places since December 19, 2008.
