= Not In Our Town =

Anti-racist organization in the United States

Not In Our Town is a project that uses documentary film, new media, and organizing to stop hate, address bullying, and build safe, inclusive communities. Not In Our Town is the primary program of The Working Group, an Oakland, California-based nonprofit media production company founded in 1988.

== Original story ==
The Not In Our Town project began in 1995 with a national PBS special that told the story of how citizens of Billings, Montana, joined forces to respond to hate crimes in their town. The program set a new standard for television impact, launching screenings and town hall meetings in hundreds of communities nationwide. The first campaign mobilized faith-based organizations, non-profits, law enforcement agencies, educators, public TV stations, labor representatives and many other stakeholders to organize anti-hate actions in local communities. Locals in Billings were surprised by the attention the town's actions received. "These are our neighbors," union organizer Rand Siemers said. "If someone throws a brick into your neighbor's house, in Montana you run out there and try to stop them. Don't they do that anywhere else in the country?"

== Subsequent projects ==
The project laid the groundwork for many subsequent films. For the past 20 years, Not In Our Town has documented hundreds of community response and proactive efforts to prevent hate and address intolerance. In addition to film making, Not In Our Town plays a direct role with schools and communities by providing hands-on support, tools, training, and coaching.

The original Not In Our Town website was hosted by PBS. In 2010, Not In Our Town expanded online offerings at NIOT.org, including over 100 short community films, crowd-sourced lessons from local communities, tools and resources, as well as an interactive map. The site is also the digital home of Not In Our School, which has more than 50 streaming school films. Many of the films have guides and lesson plans that are aligned to the Common Core State Standards. NIOT.org also features a portal for law enforcement at NIOT.org/COPS.

PBS and public media stations for key partners for Not In Our Town. Not In Our Town has collaborated with other organizations, including the U.S. Department of Justice Community Oriented Policing Services (COPS Office), the National Parent Teacher Association and Facing History and Ourselves. Their work is used overseas in Russia, Ukraine, Hungary, South Africa, and Northern Ireland.

== PBS films and public television campaigns ==
Over the past two decades, Not In Our Town produced five PBS documentaries, held thousands of community screenings nationwide. In an engagement effort sponsored by PBS and the Corporation for Public Broadcasting, Light In the Darkness involved partnerships with 17 public media stations, nearly 20 national organizations and more than 300 community screenings nationwide. Public media stations created local content and Not In Our School resources around the film, including WDET, WUSF-TV Tampa, KQED San Francisco, WQED Pittsburgh, KCPT Kansas City, Cleveland Ideastream, NPR, Nashville Public Television, and KPBS San Diego of the Fronteras network.

PBS and public television films, in reverse chronological order:

Waking in Oak Creek (2014) follows residents in Oak Creek, Wisconsin after six Sikh worshippers are killed by a white supremacist and the local community finds inspiration in the Sikh tradition of forgiveness and faith. Lt. Brian Murphy, shot 15 times in the attack, joins the mayor and police chief as they forge new bonds with the Sikh community. Young temple members, still grieving, emerge as leaders in the quest to end the violence. In the year following the tragedy, thousands gather for vigils and community events to honor the victims and seek connection. Together, a community rocked by hate is awakened and transformed by the Sikh spirit of relentless optimism.

Not In Our Town: Class Actions (2012, 30 min) profiles students and community members who are creating change in the wake of racism, anti-Semitism, and the traumatic consequences of bullying. University of Mississippi students peacefully confront old divisions and the Ku Klux Klan by turning their backs on hate, hundreds gather on the Indiana University campus to light menorah candles after anti-Semitic attacks on campus, and a massive circle of Southern California high school students break the silence about bullying at school with a loud and united chant, "Not In Our Town."

Not In Our Town: Light in the Darkness (2011, 60 min and 27 min versions), follows a community in crisis after the fatal attack of local immigrant resident Marcelo Lucero in Patchogue, New York. Stunned by the violence, diverse community stakeholders openly confront the crime and the divisive atmosphere, and commit to ongoing actions to prevent future hate crimes and intolerance.

Not In Our Town Northern California: When Hate Happens Here (2005, 60 min), a co-production with [KQED], looks at five Northern California communities dealing with deadly hate violence over a five-year period. Together, the stories reveal that whether the motivation is racism, anti-Semitism, or crimes motivated by gender or sexual orientation, hate requires a joint response. Californians find innovative ways to respond to hate and build community.

Not In Our Town II (1996, 60 min) briefly recaps the Billings story and tells six new stories about people working to create hate-free towns, cities, workplaces and schools. A Klan rally is countered with a diversity celebration; citizens work with police to address hate crimes; young people discuss how hate crimes affect their lives; office workers discover that improved communication skills can ease racial tensions and create a more harmonious workplace; people come together to rebuild burnt churches in the South; and a town finds that preventing hate before it starts is the best solution.

Not In Our Town I (1995, 30 min) is the film that launched the movement. Not In Our Town follows the citizens of Billings, Montana as they join together to respond to a series of hate crimes in their town. White supremacist activities had been on the rise. Racist literature was found around town, skinheads disrupted the services of an African-American church, the home of a Native American family was spray painted with swastikas and racist slurs, and a brick was thrown through the window of a Jewish family's home. The film follows a powerful local force—law enforcement, civic leaders, faith groups, citizen activists and local media outlets—that sent a simple and powerful message to white supremacists, "Not In Our Town." after the film was broadcast in 1995, viewers around the country began to apply this model to their own communities.

Minister and musician Fred Small wrote a song of the same name, published in 1994, telling the same story in a different format. Psychotherapist Janice Cohn wrote a book, Christmas Menorahs, and play, Paper Candles, detailing the Billings story.

== The Not In Our Town model and community campaigns ==
Many communities use Not In Our Town campaigns to bring together stakeholders from various civic sectors — school, community, law enforcement, media, and faith leaders — to address or prevent hate incidents. Bloomington, Illinois, was the first Not In Our Town city. Many other cities have passed Not In Our Town proclamations and pledges and sponsored Not In Our Town days or weeks in order to raise the issue of hate and create safe environments for their citizens, including Las Vegas, Nevada, San Francisco, California and San Antonio, Texas. In 2012, Marshalltown, Iowa launched a proactive Not In Our Town Anti-Bullying Campaign.

The model rests on several core assumptions, namely that cross-constituency engagement gives everyone a voice and leads to great inclusion; bystander behavior must be addressed and that any single person can become an "upstander" to support victims; and that positive stories can offer solutions and help shift community norms.

To help equip communities, the project provides specific films, resources and training for these key stakeholders. Not In Our Town serves educators and parents through the Not In Our School program and law enforcement—including police chiefs and prosecuting attorneys—through a collaboration with the U.S. Department of Justice Community Oriented Policing Services (COPS Office).

== Not In Our School ==
Not In Our School grew from the lessons of Not In Our Town. An initial campaign was launched by a middle school teacher in Auburn, Maine in 1996. A hallmark of Not In Our School campaigns is that students are supported in defining the problems and identifying solutions. These solutions incorporate peer-to-peer actions to make schools safe and help bystanders gather the courage to become upstanders.

Many innovative Not In Our School ideas were piloted in the Palo Alto Unified School District in Palo Alto, California starting in 2005. Today, Not In Our School supports efforts that not only address bullying, but all forms of intolerance. The program combines film, resources and coaching that help educators develop student-led programs that create safe and inclusive schools.

Lancaster, California, Marshalltown, Iowa and Paducah, Kentucky, among others, have launched citywide anti-bullying programs under the Not In Our School banner. Facing History and Ourselves co-authored curriculum on five Not In Our School films. The BULLY DVD Educator Toolkit features several Not In Our School films and materials.

The Not In Our School short film, "Gunn High School Sings Away the Hate," spread across the internet after it was tweeted by celebrity Ellen DeGeneres. More than 50 short school films are available online including "Students Map Bully Zones to Create a Safer School," "Students Take on Cyberbullying," "Lancaster, CA: A City Unites to End School Bullying," and "New Immigrants Share Their Stories."

== Not On Our Campus ==
Like Not In Our School, the original Not In Our Town story sparked a number of college campus campaigns. Scottsdale Community College in Arizona took a Not On Our Campus pledge, UC Santa Barbara created a Not In Our Hall campaign and guide for resident assistants, and Bowling Green State University as well as Skidmore College created Not On Our Campus pledge cards.

Not On Our Campus films also feature efforts at the University of Mississippi, University of San Diego and Indiana University.

== International work ==
The Not In Our Town project has sparked anti-intolerance activity in hundreds of communities in the United States and in other countries including South Africa, Ireland, Czech Republic and Ukraine. Women groups through Project Kesher started 20 Not In Our Town campaigns across the former Soviet Union starting in 2011. Not In Our Town was introduced in three cities in Hungary in Spring 2013, and was presented to six U.S. Embassies in Central Europe by the State Department. In Fall 2013, concerned Hungarian citizens launched [Nalunknem.org Nalunknem.org], modeled after NIOT.org.

== Community responses to hate incidents and crimes ==
Not In Our Town films document community responses to hate incidents and crimes. Some notable incidents include:

- Mass shooting at the Sikh Temple of Wisconsin in Oak Creek, Wisconsin in a forthcoming 30-min film, Waking in Oak Creek
- Attack on 15-year-old Walter Currie, Jr. who was set on fire in Poplar Bluff, Missouri in 2009 short film, "What About Walter?"
- Hate crime killing of Marcelo Lucero in Patchogue, New York in 2008 in Not In Our Town: Light in the Darkness
- Church shooting at the Tennessee Valley Unitarian Universalist Church in 2008 short film, "Instruments of Peace: Anniversary of Hate Attack on Unitarians"
- Murder of day laborer Serafin Negrete in Prince William County, Virginia in 2006 short film, "After an Immigrant Murder - A Call for Response and Unity."
- Cross-burning on an African-American family's lawn in Anderson, California in 2004 in Not In Our Town: Northern California.
- Murder of transgender teen Gwen Araujo in Newark, California in 2002 in Not In Our Town: Northern California.
- Murder of gay couple Gary Matson and Winfield Mowder by two white supremacist brothers in Redding, California in 1999 in Not In Our Town: Northern California.
- Arsons at three Sacramento, California-area synagogues in 1999 in Not In Our Town: Northern California.

== Community responses to hate groups ==
Not In Our Town films have featured creative community responses to hate group rallies and protests.

- Responses to Westboro Baptist Church hate group protests, including the use of singing at Gunn High School in Palo Alto, California; dancing at Lowell High School in San Francisco, California; umbrellas and shields in Bloomington, Illinois; angel costumes in Newark, California; and a flash mob in Charleston, West Virginia.
- Response to the Aryan Nations hate group in Gettysburg, Pennsylvania
- Response to the National Socialist Movement hate group in Olympia, Washington and Leith, North Dakota
- Response to the Ku Klux Klan hate group in Kokomo, Indiana and Oxford, Mississippi
