= Garfield School (Billings, Montana) =

- U.S. National Register of Historic Places
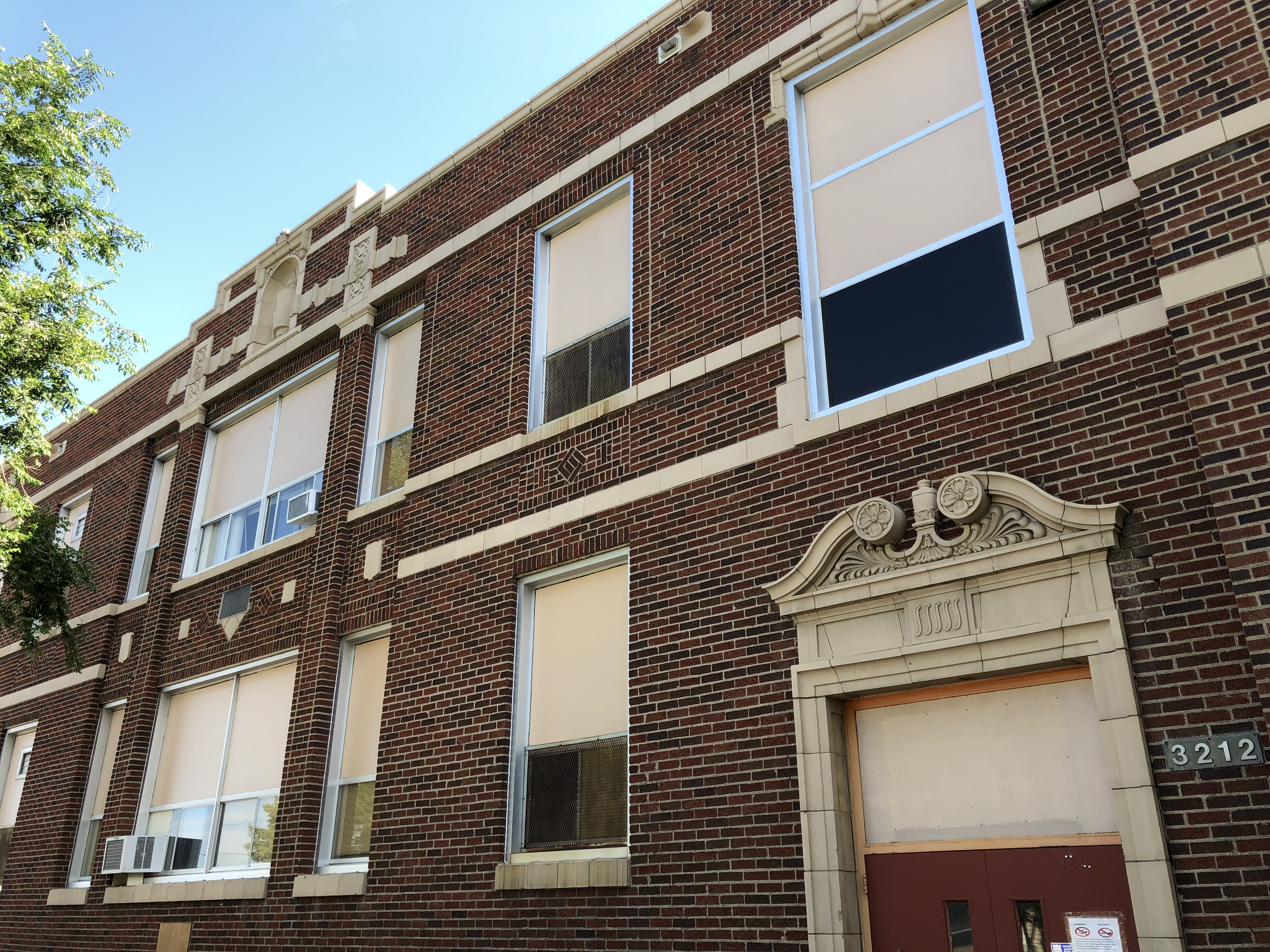

- Location within Montana
- Location: 3212 1st Ave., S.S, Billings, Montana
- Coordinates: 45°46′35″N 108°30′30″W
- Area: 2 acres (0.81 ha)
- Built: 1920, 1934, 1948
- Architect: McIver & Cohagen; Cohagen, Chandler C.
- Architectural style: Classical Revival
- NRHP reference No.: 12000830
- Added to NRHP: October 3, 2012

The Garfield School, at 3212 1st Ave., S.S in Billings, Montana, was built in 1920 and was listed on the National Register of Historic Places in 2012. It has also been known as the New South School and the Garfield Building.

It is a two-storey brick masonry building with a daylit basement. It was built in stages in 1920, 1934, and 1948 as additions to an original 1901 building, which was itself demolished in 1981. The additions were all designed by Chandler C. Cohagen of McIver & Cohagen.
