= Chandler C. Cohagen =

American architect

- Born: April 24, 1889; Pierson, Iowa, U.S.
- Died: December 9, 1985 (aged 96); Billings, Montana, U.S.
- Education: University of Michigan
- Occupation: Architect
- Spouse: Flora J. Brown

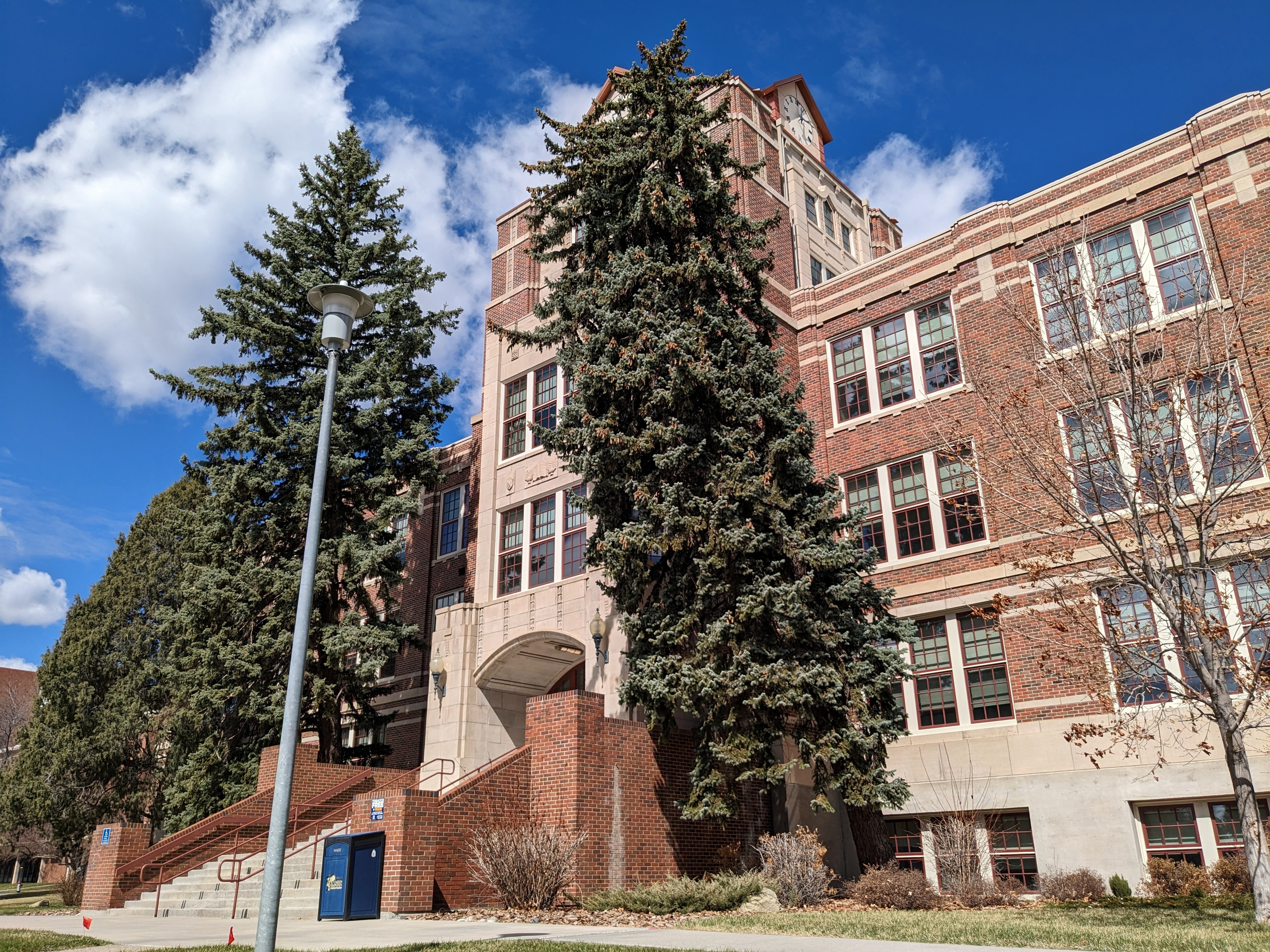
McMullen Hall of Montana State University Billings, designed by Cohagen, for McIver & Cohagen, in the Collegiate Gothic style and completed in 1935.

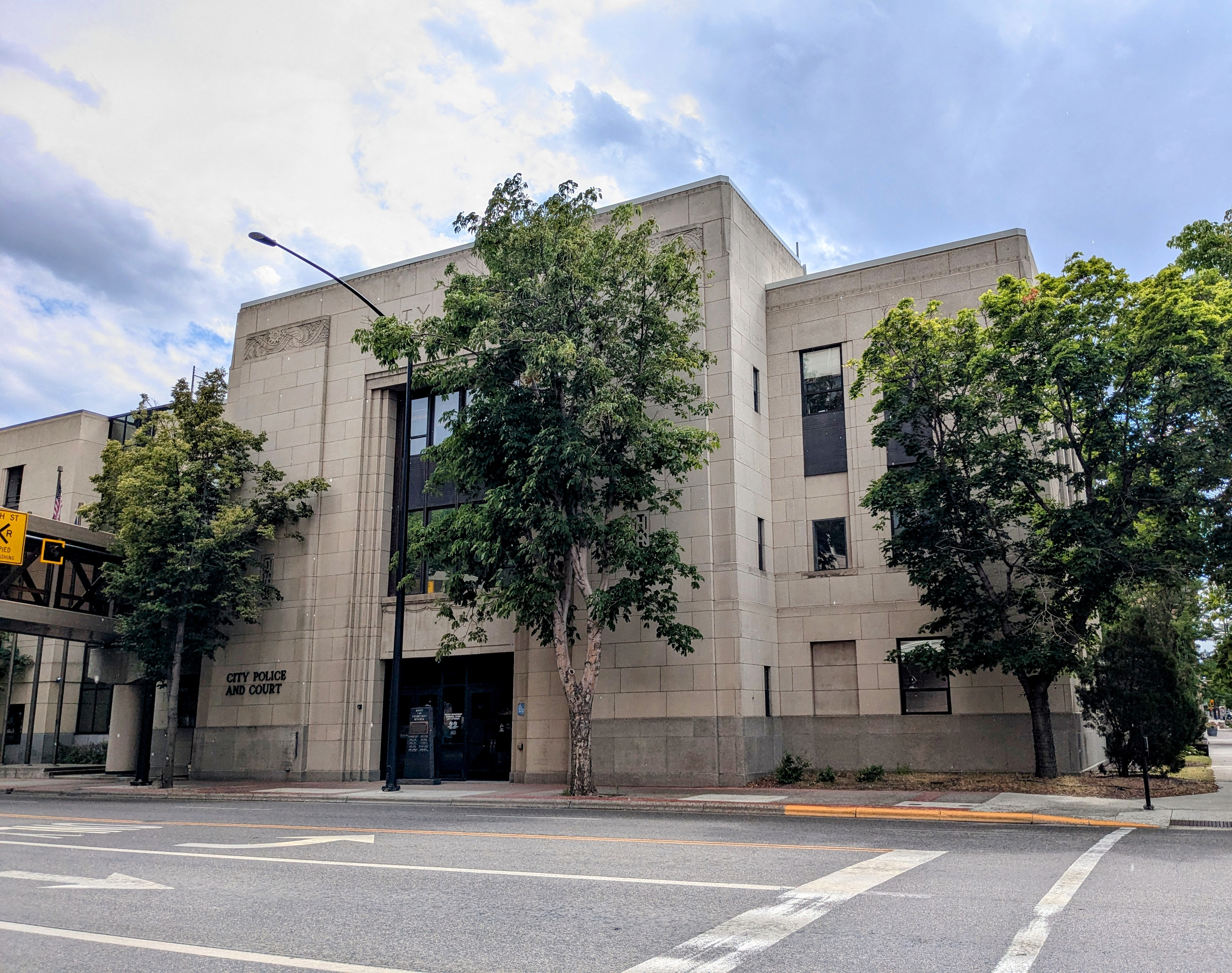
The former Billings City Hall, designed by associated architects Chandler C. Cohagen, Cushing & Terrell and J. G. Link & Company in the Art Deco style and completed in 1940.

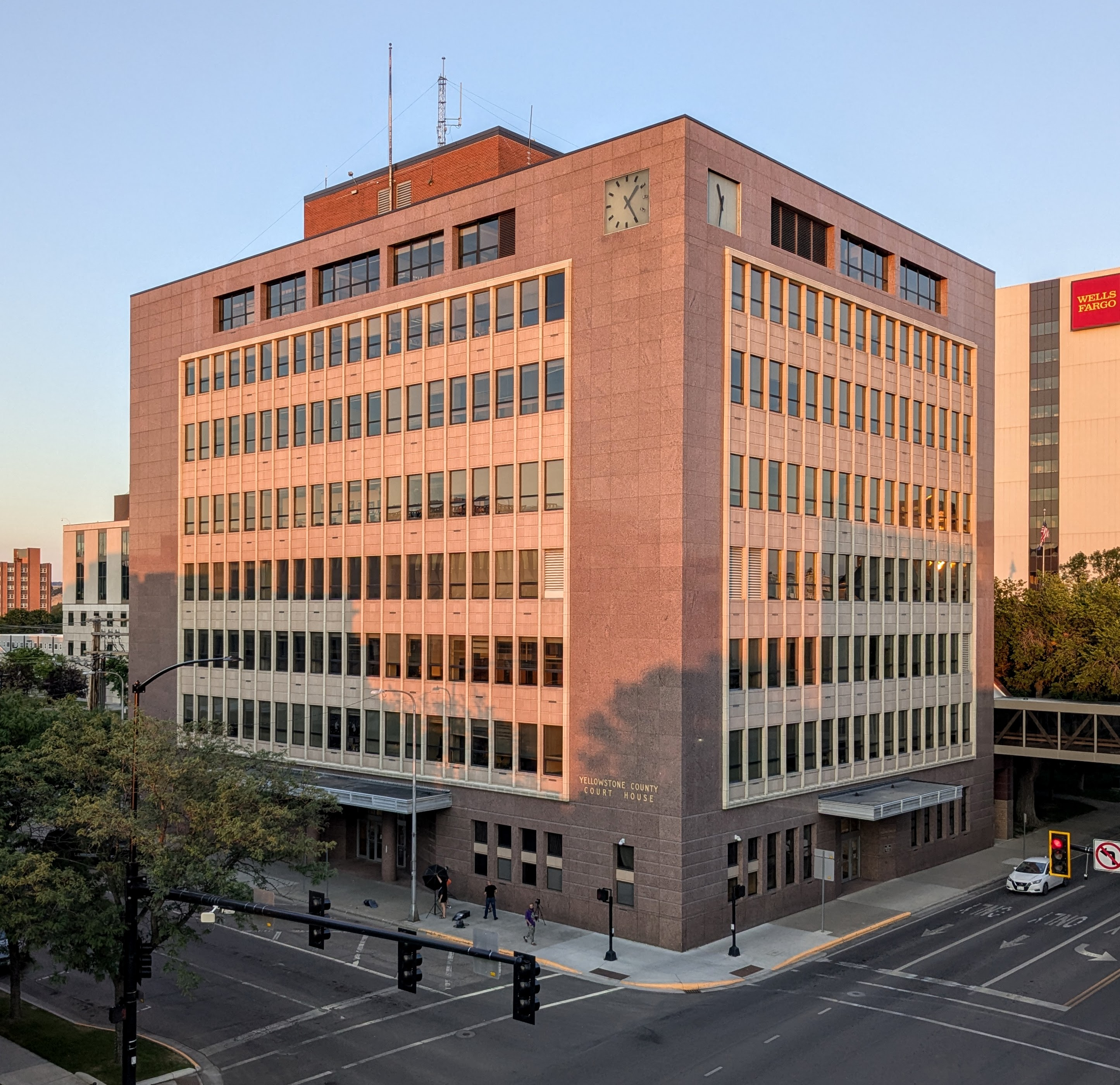
The Yellowstone County Courthouse in Billings, designed by Cohagen in a modernist style and completed in 1958.

Chandler C. Cohagen FAIA (April 24, 1889 - December 9, 1985) was an American architect who designed around 200 buildings in the state of Montana, including the current Montana Governor's Residence.

== Early life ==
Cohagen was born on April 24, 1889, in Pierson, Iowa near Sioux City. He was educated in Le Mars, Iowa, and he moved to Billings, Montana with his family in 1907. He graduated from the University of Michigan in 1915. While he was at UM, he co-founded the Alpha Rho Chi fraternity.

== Career ==
Cohagen became an architect in Great Falls in 1915, when he co-founded the firm of McIver, Cohagen and Marshall with Angus Vaughn McIver and Walter Vancleve Marshall, returning to Billings shortly thereafter. Marshall left the partnership in 1919 and in 1936 Cohagen and McIver, who had remained in Great Falls, dissolved their partnership. Cohagen spent most of his life in Billings, where he served on the city council from 1925 to 1927.

Cohagen designed around 200 buildings in Montana over the course of his career. Major projects included McMullen Hall (1935) of Montana State University Billings, the former Billings City Hall (1940), Yellowstone County Courthouse (1958) and the current Montana Governor's Residence (1959).

Cohagen was a member of the Montana Board of Architects, which regulates the profession in the state, from 1925 to 1962, variously filling the roles of secretary, vice-president and president. In 1958 he joined the board of National Council of Architectural Registration Boards (1958), which coordinates the activities of such boards. He served two terms as first and second vice president and as president for the year 1963. Cohagen became a Fellow of the American Institute of Architects in 1951.

== Personal life and death ==
Cohagen married Flora J. Brown in 1917, and she died in 1958. A Freemason, he was a member of the Order of DeMolay and the Grand Lodge of Montana.

Cohagen died on December 9, 1985, in Billings, Montana. His papers are held in the Montana State University Library in Bozeman, Montana.

== Architectural works ==
For works of McIver & Cohagen, see Angus V. McIver

- 1938 – Hot Springs County Courthouse, 415 Arapahoe St, Thermopolis, Wyoming
- 1939 – Fromberg High School, 319 School St, Fromberg, Montana
  - NRHP-listed.
- 1940 – Billings City Hall (former), 220 N 27th St, Billings, Montana
  - Designed by Chandler C. Cohagen, Cushing & Terrell and J. G. Link & Company, associated architects. At that time there were only these three architectural firms in Billings.
- 1947 – Science Building, Montana State University Billings, Billings, Montana
- 1949 – First Baptist Church, 218 N 34th St, Billings, Montana
- 1953 – Billings Family YMCA, 402 N 32nd St, Billings, Montana
- 1958 – Yellowstone County Courthouse, 217 N 27th St, Billings, Montana
  - Designed by Chandler C. Cohagen, architect, with Loners, Stroebe & Johnson, supervising architects.
- 1959 – Montana Governor's Residence, 2 Carson St, Helena, Montana
- 1961 – Central Christian Church, 1221 16th St W, Billings, Montana
