= Timeline of Billings, Montana =

Coordinates: 45.786667°N 108.537222°W

The following is a timeline of the history of the city of Billings, Montana, USA.

== Prior to 20th century ==
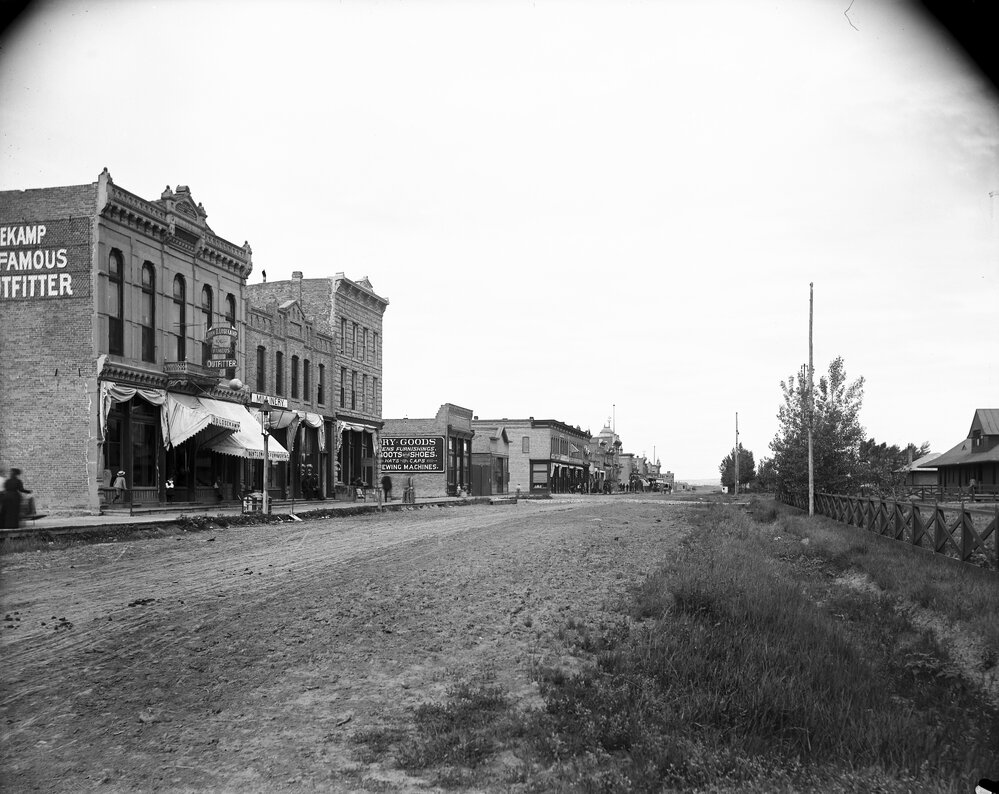
Montana Avenue, 1894

- 1877 – Homesteaders arrive.
- 1882
  - The Northern Pacific Railway reached the Yellowstone river valley.
  - March 24: Incorporation date of the Minnesota and Montana Land and Improvement Company.
  - First church established.
  - Billings Herald newspaper begins publication.
  - Billings Cemetery established.
- 1883
  - Coulson-Billings street railway begins operating.
  - Billings Fire Brigade organized.
  - Billings first depot built.
- 1884 – The city is incorporated. John Tully is elected first mayor.
- 1885 – Billings Daily Gazette newspaper begins publication.
- 1889 – Town becomes part of new State of Montana.
- 1891 – The Weekly Times newspaper begins publication.

== 20th century ==
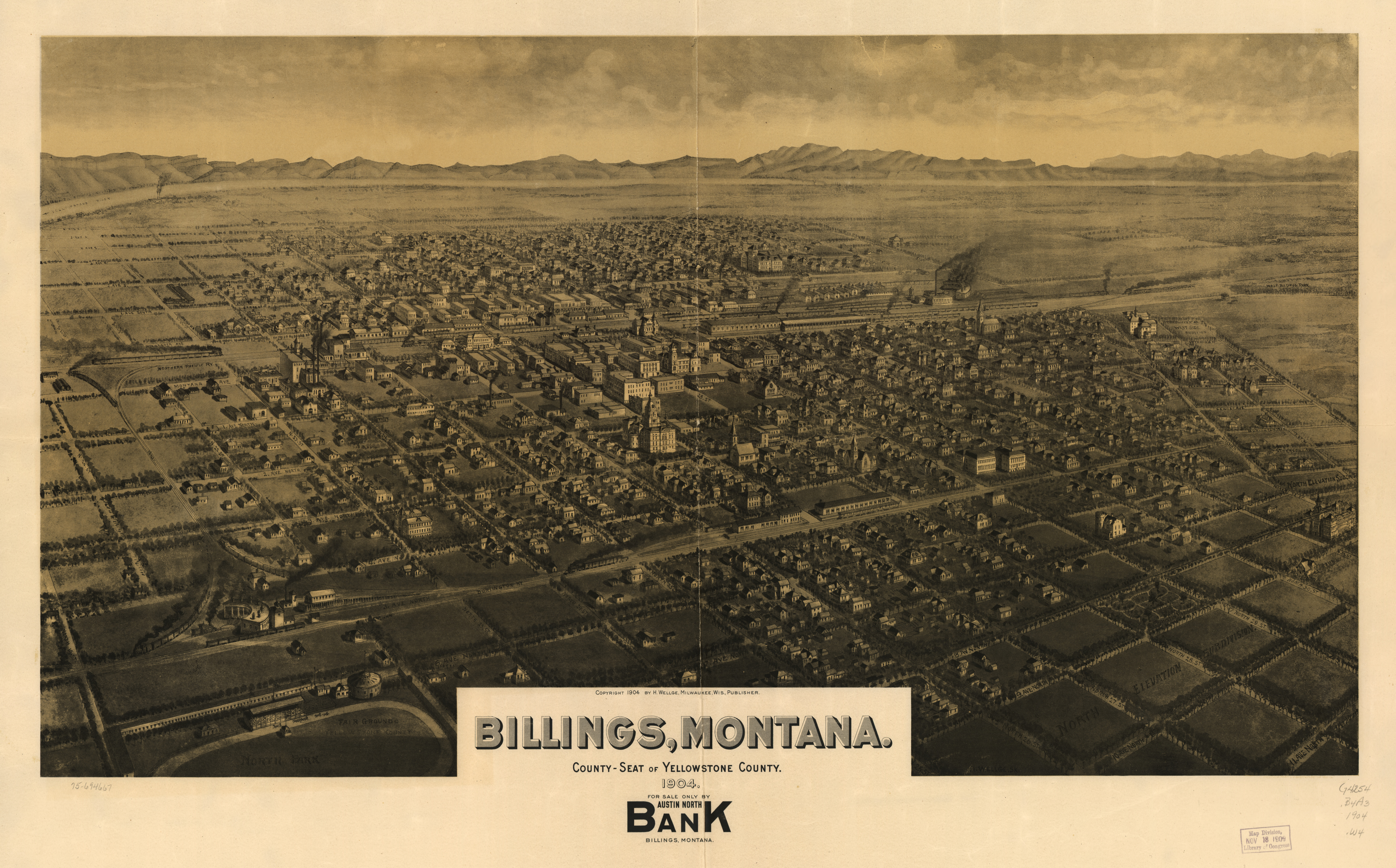
Billings, hand-drawn map, 1904

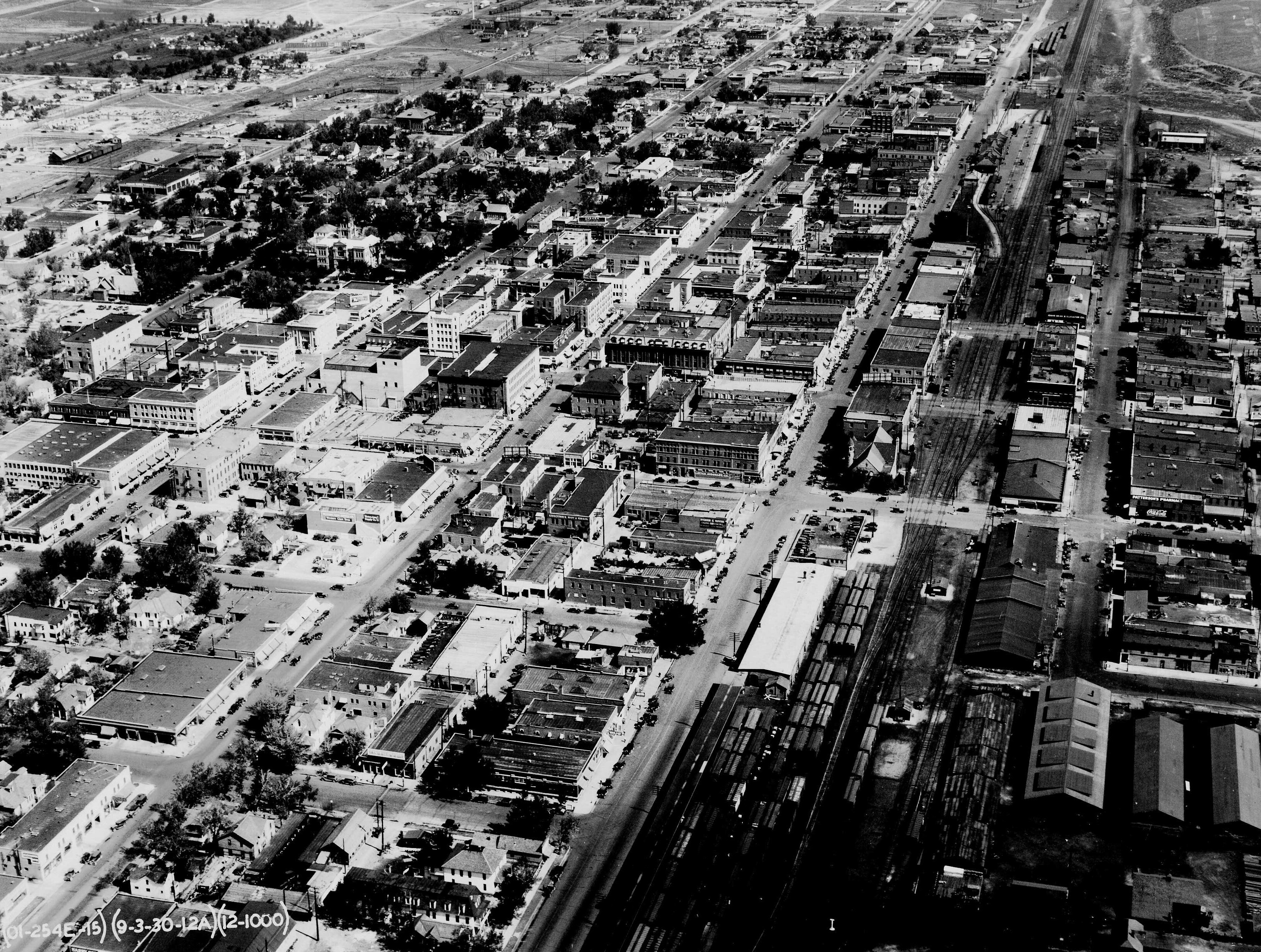
Downtown Billings, 1940s

- 1901 – Public Library established.
- 1903 –
  - Moss Mansion (residence) built.
  - Tunnel for BBWA Canal begins being dug through the Rimrocks.
- 1904 – Northern Hotel opened for business.
- 1907 – Babcock Theatre built.
- 1908 – Billings Polytechnic Institute founded, the first post-secondary school in Billings.
- 1909 – Northern Pacific Depot constructed, replacing former station. In addition to the Northern Pacific railway company, it served Great Northern and Chicago, Burlington and Quincy.
- 1910
  - Masonic Temple (Billings, Montana) built.
  - Population: 10,031.
- 1912 – Billings and Central Montana Railway in operation.
- 1917 – Cereal Food Processor Building constructed.
- 1927 – Eastern Montana Normal School founded.
- 1928 – Billings Municipal Airport begins operating.
- 1929 – Yale Oil refinery begins operating.
- 1931 – Fox Theater opens.
- 1932 – Cobb Field baseball park opens.
- 1935 –
  - Intermountain Union College relocated to Billings (approximate date).
  - McMullen Hall at Eastern Montana Normal School completed.
- 1937 – Pictograph Cave excavation begins near city.
- 1940 –
  - Billings Senior High School opens.
  - Original Northern Hotel burns down.
- 1942 – Newly built 10-story Northern Hotel opens for business.
- 1944 – St. Patrick's High School established.
- 1947
  - Rocky Mountain College established.
  - Carter Oil Company refinery built near Billings.
- 1948 – Billings Mustangs baseball team formed.
- 1950
  - Billings Symphony Orchestra founded.
  - Shrine Auditorium built.
  - Population: 31,834.
- 1953 – Billings Studio Theater company founded.
- 1957 – Yellowstone County Courthouse built.
- 1958 – June 2: Tornado.
- 1959 – Billings West High School established.
- 1962 – Kampgrounds of America headquartered in Billings.
- 1964 – Yellowstone Art Center opens.
- 1969 – Billings Vocational-Technical Education Center (BVTC) opens.
- 1971 – Western Heritage Center opens.
- 1972 – Liberal Arts building completed at Eastern Montana College
- 1974 – Sage Tower built.
- 1975
  - Montana Entertainment Trade and Recreation Arena opens.
  - Granite Tower built.
  - Rimrock Mall in business.
- 1977 – Norwest Bank built.
- 1980
  - Sheraton Hotel built.
  - City covered in ash from 1980 eruption of Mount St. Helens.
  - Population: 66,798.
- 1982 – Rocky Plaza condos built.
- 1985 – First Interstate Center opens.
- 1986 – Flag of Billings, Montana design adopted.
- 1987 – Skyview High School established.
- 1988 – City filled with smoke from Yellowstone fires of 1988.
- 1990 – Population: 81,151.
- 1992 – December 18: Airplane crash.
- 1993
  - Billings Bulls ice hockey team formed.
  - Community members protest antisemitism, launching the Not In Our Town movement.
- 1994 – Montana Women's Prison in operation.
- 1995 –
  - ZooMontana opens.
  - Eastern Montana College and the Vocational-Technical Education Center become Montana State University Billings.

- 1996 – Charles "Chuck" Tooley becomes mayor.
- 1999
  - Four Dances Natural Area acquired by US Bureau of Land Management.
  - City website online.
  - Mormon Temple dedicated.

== 21st century ==
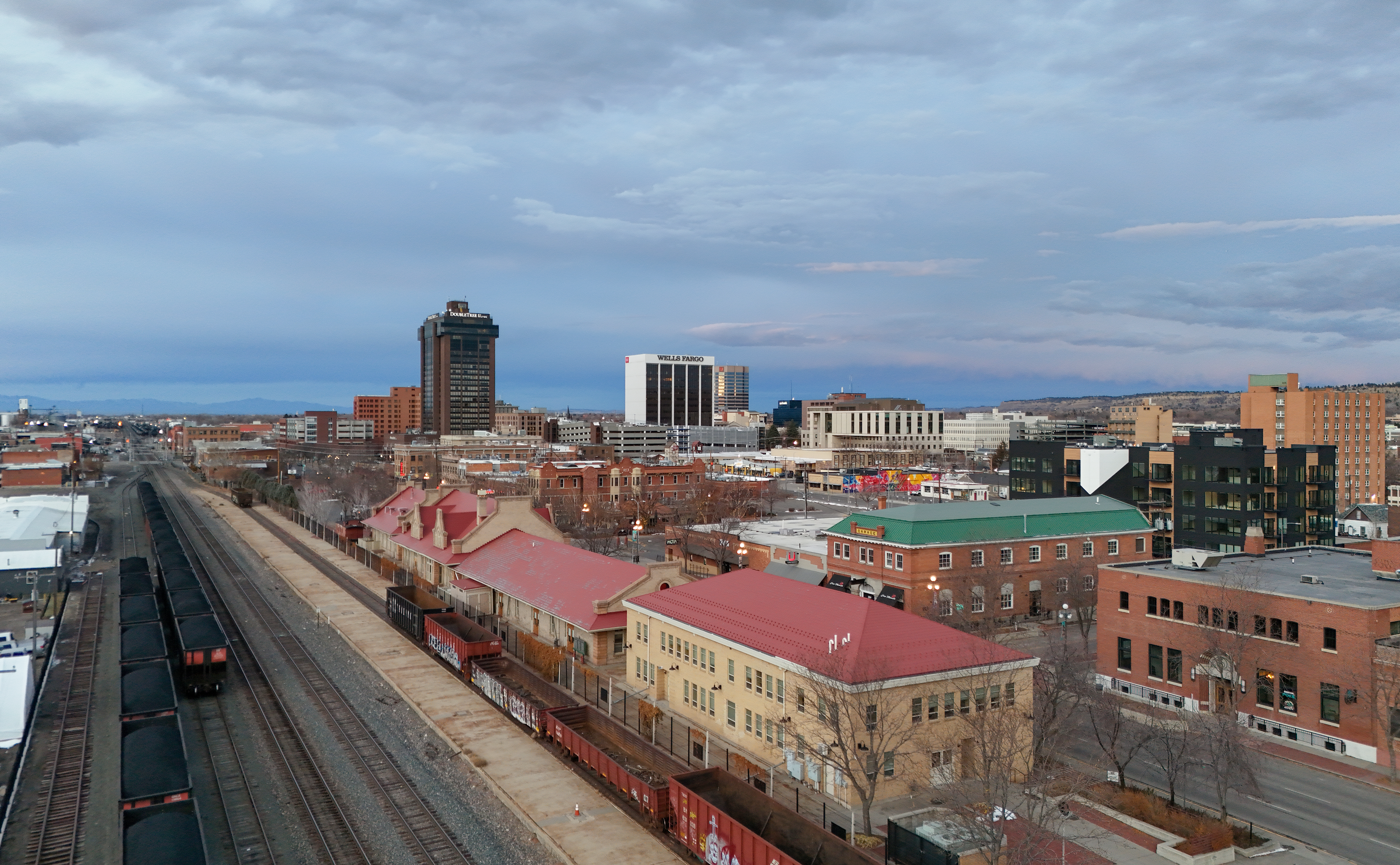
Downtown Billings, 2024

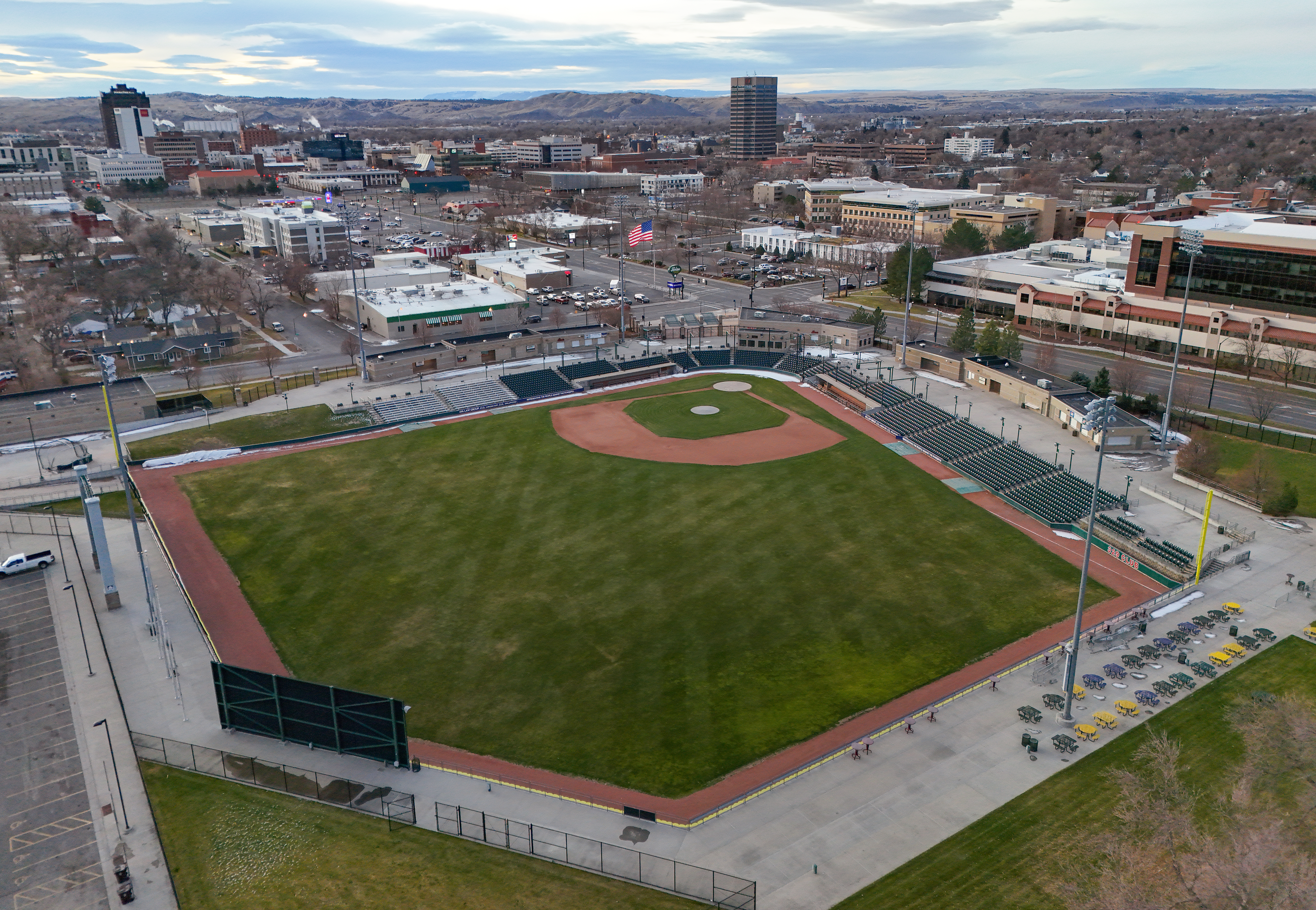
Dehler Park, 2024

- 2000 – Population: 89,847.
- 2002 – Skypoint awning/sculpture installed.
- 2007 – Billings Dharma Center dedicated.
- 2008 – Dehler Park (stadium) opens.
- 2009
  - Magic City Rollers roller derby league formed.
  - Tom Hanel becomes mayor.
- 2010
  - June 20: 2010 Billings tornado.
  - Population: 104,170.
- 2011 – July: Oil pipeline bursts near city.
- 2012
  - New federal courthouse built.
  - Northern Hotel reopens.
- 2014 – New public library built.
- 2017 – Bill Cole becomes mayor.
- 2020 – Population: 117,116.
- 2022 – Shrine Auditorium reopens as the Eagle Seeker Community Center.
- 2023 – Rocky Vista University campus opens.
- 2024
  - Inner Belt Loop (Skyway Drive) completed.
  - Billings Logan International Airport terminal expanded.
- 2025 – Billings City Hall moved to former federal building.
- 2026 – Mike Nelson becomes mayor.

== See also ==
- Billings Metropolitan Area
- Crow Indian Reservation, established 1868
- History of Montana
- List of mayors of Billings, Montana
- Media in Billings, Montana
- Sections of Billings, Montana
- State of Montana
- Territory of Montana
- Timeline of Montana history
  - Timeline of pre-statehood Montana history

== Bibliography ==
- "(Billings)", Official Northern Pacific Railway Guide, St. Paul, Minn.: W.C. Riley, 1899
- "Billings, Montana". National Magazine. Boston. November 1905.
- Marius R. Campbell (1915), "Billings", Guidebook of the Western United States: Northern Pacific Route, U.S. Government Printing Office
- Federal Writers' Project (1939). "Billings". Montana: a State Guide Book. American Guide Series. NY: Viking Press. hdl:2027/mdp.39015005748036. + Chronology
- Kliewer, Waldo O. "The Foundations of Billings, Montana." Pacific Northwest Quarterly 31.3 (1940): 255–283. online
- Van West, Carroll. Capitalism on the frontier: Billings and the Yellowstone Valley in the nineteenth century (U of Nebraska Press, 1993) online.
- George Thomas Kurian (1994), "Billings, Montana", World Encyclopedia of Cities, vol. 1: North America, Santa Barbara, Calif.: ABC-CLIO, OL 1431653M (fulltext via Open Library)
- David J. Wishart, ed. (2004). "Cities and Towns: Billings, Montana". Encyclopedia of the Great Plains. University of Nebraska Press. ISBN 0-8032-4787-7.
- Hardt, Mark D. "The Emergence of a Competitive Core: Bifurcation Dynamics in Billings, Montana." in Downtowns: Revitalizing the Centers of Small Urban Communities (2013).
