= List of mayors of Billings, Montana =

The mayor of Billings, Montana presides over the Billings, Montana city council and executes its legal contracts. The mayor is elected every four years and may serve no more than two consecutive terms. The Billings city council consists of ten members, with two elected for each of the five wards. They are elected to four year terms, limited to two consecutive terms. The Billings city administrator runs the executive branch.

== History ==
Billings was incorporated 1884 with a mayor-council structure. John Tully was elected the first mayor that year.

=== 1900s ===
Since 1911, the office of mayor is non-partisan per state statute.

Billings adopted a charter form of government on September 14, 1976, essentially a council-manager structure. It became effective May 2, 1977. Under this form of government, Billings has a City Administrator who oversees day-to-day administration of Billings while the mayor presides over and votes in the city council meetings.

=== 2000s ===
In 2009, Republican Tom Hanel won the five-candidate September primary for Mayor of Billings with 52%, and went on to beat city councilman Dick Clark 68-32% in November to succeed Ronald Tussing. Hanel was re-elected for his second and final term in November 2013, winning against bail bondsman John McFadden 79-21%. Hanel inaugurated several projects, including the Yellowstone Kelly Interpretive Site, Logan airport renovations, and oversaw cleanup efforts following the 2010 Billings tornado. Hanel also made some controversial decisions in his role on the city council, most notably his tie-breaking vote to kill efforts to pass a Non-Discrimination Ordinance (NDO) in August 2014, which would have given extra legal protections against discrimination on the basis of religion, gender, race, and sexuality. Hanel was succeeded as mayor by Bill Cole in January 2018.

In 2017, Tom Hanel was term-limited. Lawyer Bill Cole faced member of the Montana Senate, Jeff Essmann, with Cole winning by 7,000 votes. He took office on January 2, 2018. Much of his mayoralty was spent dealing with the COVID-19 pandemic and he encouraged residents of Billings to take the COVID-19 vaccine. During his time as mayor Centennial Park was constructed, an $11.6 million was granted for the construction of the Skyline Trail and Skyway Drive, and he passed two public safety levies property tax. Cole announced his intention to run for re-election on April 22, 2021.

In 2025, the mayoral race was between businessowner Mike Nelson, councilwoman Jennifer Owen, councilman Mike Boyett, and recent graduate Amanda Housler. While the election was officially nonpartisan, Nelson was supported by Democratic former governor Brian Schweitzer and former Montana Democratic Party chair Robyn Driscoll, and Owen was backed by 16 local Republican legislators. Nelson avoided all political labels. In the end, Nelson won the November general election by one of the tightest margins in Billings mayoral history, with only 177 votes separating him and Owen. This was the closest Billings mayoral election since 1931, when Fred Tilton won by a margin of 114, though only about 3,000 votes were cast that year.

== Election results ==
Billings Mayoral Primary Election, 2009
Party	Candidate	Votes	%
Nonpartisan	Tom Hanel	10,840	52.3%
Nonpartisan	Dick Clark	3,302	15.9%
Nonpartisan	Mike Yakawich	3,184	15.4%
Nonpartisan	Christopher Cook	2,184	10.5%
Nonpartisan	Ray Tracy	1,117	5.4%
	write-ins	96	0.5%
Total votes		20,723	100%

Billings Mayoral General Election, 2009
Party	Candidate	Votes	%
Nonpartisan	Tom Hanel	15,777	67.8%
Nonpartisan	Dick Clark	7,371	31.7%
	write-ins	129	0.6%
Total votes		23,277	100%

Billings Mayoral General Election, 2013
Party	Candidate	Votes	%
Nonpartisan	Tom Hanel	24,140	78.5%
Nonpartisan	John McFadden	6,386	20.8%
	write-ins	220	0.7%
Total votes		30,746	100%

Billings Mayoral General Election, 2025
Party	Candidate	Votes	%
Nonpartisan	Mike Nelson	11,754	39.1%
Nonpartisan	Jennifer Owen	11,577	38.5%
Nonpartisan	Mike Boyett	4,777	15.9%
Nonpartisan	Amanda Housler	1,912	6.4%
	write-ins	51	0.2%
Total votes		30,071	100%

== List ==
=== 1884–1977 ===
#	Mayor	Term	Notes
1	John Tully	1884 – 1887	Water works and electric lights were installed in 1886.
2	William P. Matheson	July 1885 – April 1887	
3	James R. Gross	April 1887 – April 1888	
4	E.B. Camp	April 1888 – May 1889	
5	Fred H. Foster	May 1889 – April 1890	(1856-1917) Elected four times in three non-consecutive terms. Created the first Board of Health for the city.
6	Joseph Rinehart	April 1890 – April 1891	
7	George Griggs	April 1891 – April 1892	Served twice as mayor.
8	H.K. Fish	April 1892 – January 1893	
9	John D. Losekamp	January 1893 – April 1893	
10	Fred H. Foster	April 1893 – April 1894	Second of three non-consecutive terms
11	George Griggs	April 1895 – May 1897	Second time as mayor
12	Henry H. Chapple	May 1897 – August 1898	resigned
13	P.H. Smith	August 1898 – April 1899	
14	Chris Yegen	April 1899 – May 1901	
15	W.B. George	May 1901 – May 1903	Accepted deed on behalf of the city for new public library from Frederick H. Billings.
16	Fred H. Foster	May 1903 – April 1909	Third and fourth term, two previous non-consecutive
17	H.J. Thompson	April 1909 – May 1911	
18	Frank Woods	May 1911 – April 1912	
19	Robert Leavens	April 1912 – April 1915	
20	E.A. Gerhart	April 1915 – April 1917	
21	W.M. Johnston	April 1917 – April 1919	
22	W. Lee Mains	April 1919 – April 1921	
23	William V. Beers	April 1921 – February 1925	
24	Edwin Grafton	February 1925 – February 1927	resigned
25	Arthur Trenerry	February 1927 – April 1931	(1881-1962) Advocated for city against accusations of graft related to Prohibition
26	Fred Tilton	April 1931 – December 1933	died in office
27	C.J. Williams	1933–1937	
28	Charles T. Trott	1937–1943	
29	Harry E. Biddinger	1943–1949	closed the red-light district
30	Thompson T. Rowe	1949–1953	
31	Earle Knight	1953–1959	
32	Carl J. Clavadetscher	1959–1962	resigned
33	Harold E. Gerke	1962–1963	
34	Willard E. Fraser	1963–1969	Established first city-run bus service. Annexed the Heights.
35	Howard E. Hultgren	1969–1971	
36	Willard E. Fraser	1971–1972	died in office
37	Joseph A. Leone	1972–1977	

=== 1977–Current ===
#	Mayor	Term	Notes
38	William "Bill" B. Fox	1977–1983	
39	James "Jim" Van Arsdale	1984–1990	Was President of the Montana League of Cities and Towns during his tenure., Assisted with Pompeys Pillar becoming a National Monument.
40	Richard "Dick" L. Larson	1990–1996	
41	Chuck F. Tooley	1996–2005	Won three terms. Was appointed a State Human Rights Commissioner.
42	Ronald Tussing	2006–2010	Chief of Police prior to election. Ran for public service commission rather than second term as mayor.
43	Tom Hanel	2010–2018	Cast the tie-breaking vote against a non-discrimination ordinance for Billings Term-limited
44	Bill Cole	2018–2026	Defeated his opponent by nearly double the votes in 2017. Advocated for COVID-19 vaccination. Term-limited
45	Mike Nelson	2026–present	Won 2025 election against 3 other candidates by 177 votes. His primary opponent was backed by Republican-aligned donors while Nelson was backed by Democratic-aligned donors.

== See also ==
- Timeline of Billings, Montana
