= First Interstate =

First Interstate could refer to:

- First Interstate Bancorp, a former bank now a part of Wells Fargo
- First Interstate BancSystem, the current bank based in the upper American Mountain West
- Interstate 1, numerically the first interstate highway
- Pennsylvania Turnpike, one of three highways claimed to be the first interstate highway
- Missouri interstates 44 and 70, second of three states claiming first interstate highways
  - Interstate 44 in Missouri
  - Interstate 70 in Missouri
- Interstate 70 in Kansas, claimed first paved in interstate highway system
