= China Alley =

China Alley may be:

- China Alley (Bakersfield)
- China Alley (Billings)
- China Alley (Hanford)
- China Alley (Ventura)

== See also ==
- Chinatown
