= TierOne Bank =

Defunct American bank based in Nebraska

- Traded as: Nasdaq: TONE
- Founded: 1907; 119 years ago in Lincoln, Nebraska
- Defunct: June 4, 2010; 16 years ago
- Fate: Failed, held in receivership by the FDIC; assets acquired by Great Western Bank
- Successor: Great Western Bank (now First Interstate Bank)
- Headquarters: Lincoln, Nebraska, USA
- Area served: Nebraska, Iowa, Kansas
- Website: http://www.tieronebank.com/ (defunct)

TierOne Bank was a bank based in Lincoln, Nebraska. It was founded in 1907. It traded on the Nasdaq stock exchange until its failure in June 2010. Following an investigation by the FBI and SIGTARP, charges were filed against multiple TierOne executives. The CEO, Gilbert G. Lundstrom, and several other executives and auditors faced charges related to the failure.

== History ==
TierOne Bank was founded as Fidelity Savings and Loan Association in 1907, and underwent several name changes before finally changing its name to TierOne Bank in 2002. The bank received a federal charter in 1935, making it one of the first savings and loan associations to receive this as well as deposit insurance. In April 2002 TierOne announced its intent to change from a mutual bank to a public company. In October 2002, TierOne was listed on the Nasdaq with the stock symbol TONE. Trading of the shares was suspended on May 7, 2010, and the stock was delisted the same month.

=== Failure ===
On June 4, 2010, the Office of Thrift Supervision closed TierOne and appointed the Federal Deposit Insurance Corporation (FDIC) as the receiver. Of the 764 TierOne employees at the time of failure, 550 were retained by the Great Western Bank, who also signed a purchase and assumption agreement with the FDIC. It was the largest bank failure in Nebraska's history.

==== Charges ====
After the failure, CEO Gilbert G. Lundstrom faced 13 criminal charges related to his deception of investors, including conspiracy to commit wire fraud. The prosecution claimed that Lundstrom was "the architect of an aggressive strategy to expand the bank's portfolio" and "Lundstrom's bet on real estate in riskier areas decimated the bank" during the 2008 financial crisis. In March 2016, Lundstrom was sentenced to 132 months in prison, and was ordered to pay a fine of $1.2 million, equivalent to $1.61 million in 2025. $3,122,696 in restitution was ordered to be paid to all defendants.. Lundstrom was released from federal custody on 2 August 2024.

=== Post-failure ===
The FDIC's receivership was terminated in 2022. Great Western Bank was purchased by, and merged into, First Interstate BancSystem in 2022.

== See also ==
- List of banks acquired or bankrupted during the Great Recession
- List of largest bank failures in the United States
