= List of tallest buildings in Billings =

Skyline of Billings
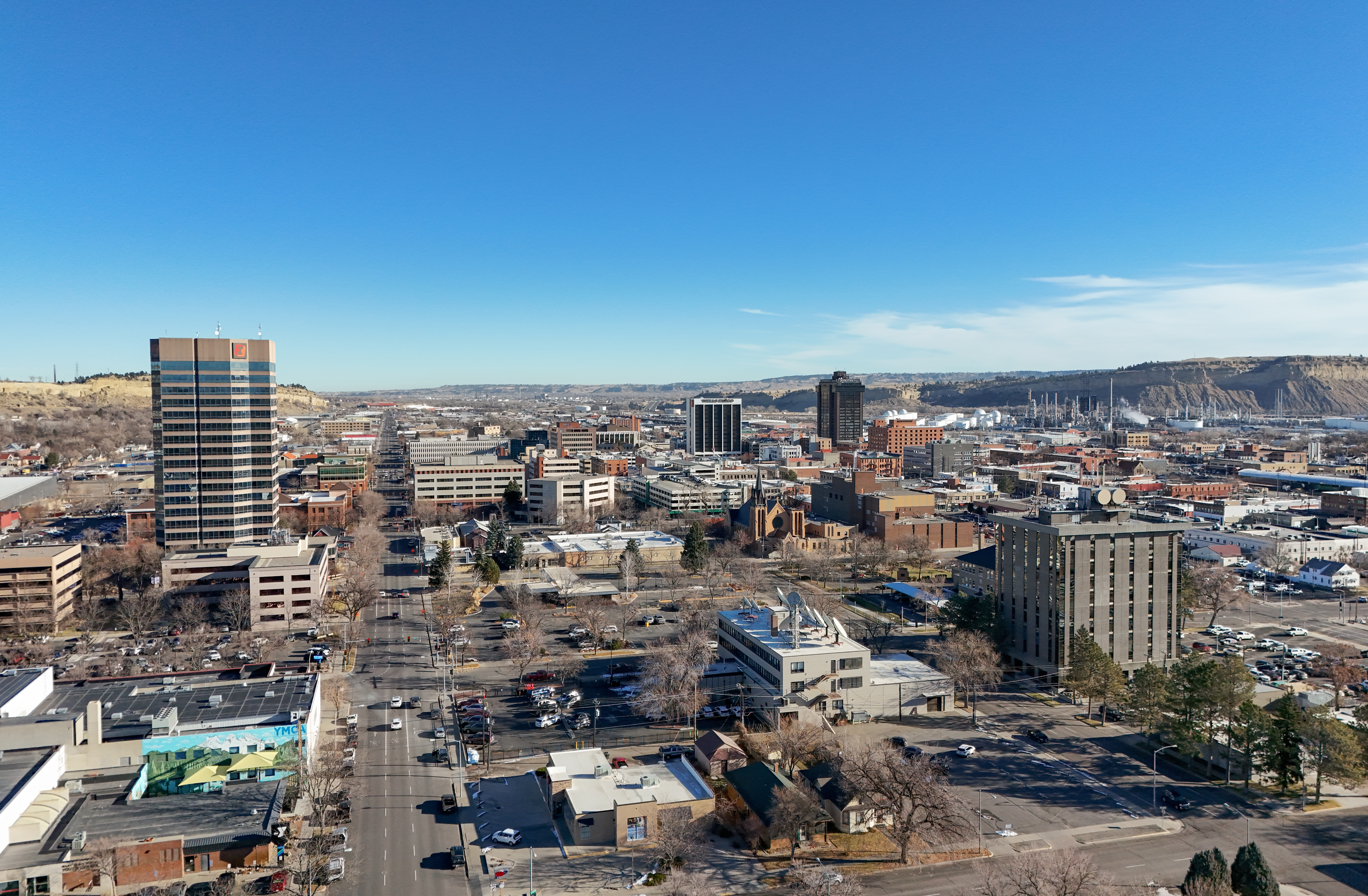
- Downtown Billings in 2024
- Tallest building: First Interstate Center (1985)
- Tallest building height: 272 (83)

Number of tall buildings
- Taller than 50 m (164 ft): 3
- Taller than 75 m (246 ft): 2

Number of tall buildings — feet
- Taller than 200 ft (61.0 m): 2

This is a list of the tallest buildings in Billings, Montana.

== Cityscape ==
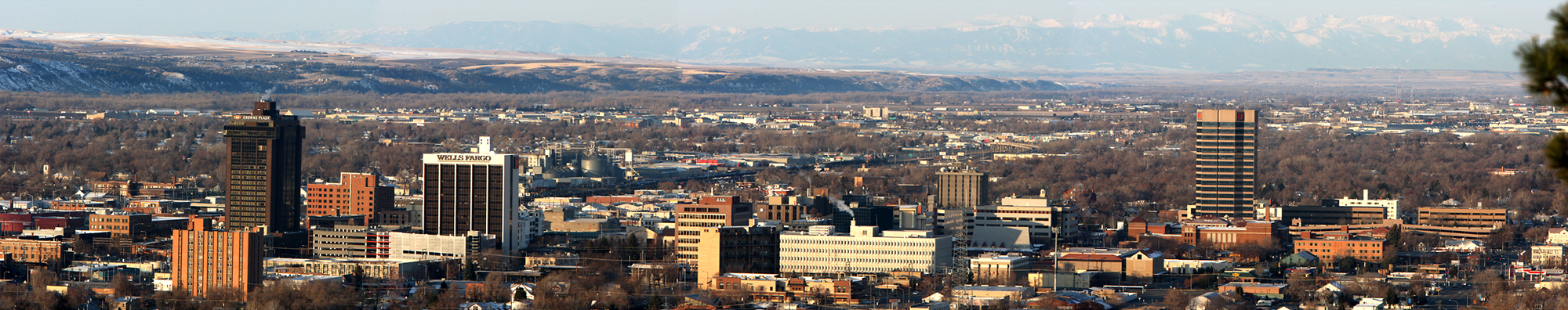
Billings skyline with the Beartooth Mountains in the background

== Tallest buildings ==
This list ranks completed buildings in Billings that stand at least 100 feet (30 m) tall as of 2026, based on standard height measurement. This includes spires and architectural details but does not include antenna masts, unless noted otherwise. The "Year" column indicates the year of completion.

Was the tallest building in Billings upon completion

Rank	Name	Image	Height ft (m)	Floors	Year	Purpose	Notes
1	First Interstate Center		272 (83)	20	1985	Office	The tallest building in Billings and Montana, and the First Interstate BancSystem headquarters. Located in the Transwestern Plaza, a complex consisting of four office towers with a total of 35 floors—the largest commercial development in Montana.
2	Doubletree by Hilton Billings		256 (78)	22	1980	Hotel	The tallest building in Billings from 1980 to 1985, and the tallest hotel in Montana. Upon completion, declared the tallest load-bearing brick building in the world by the Brick Institute of America, with a facade containing 2.3 million bricks. A rarity for its time in that it is built using the facade system of applied masonry, which was usually used in the facade construction of buildings pre-World War II
3	Wells Fargo Plaza		176 (54)	14	1977	Office	The third tallest building in Billings and Montana. Used primarily for office space. Opened in 1977 as First Northwestern Bank, becoming Norwest Bank in 1983, and finally Wells Fargo Plaza in 2000 after Wells Fargo merged with Norwest Bank.
4	Cereal Food Processor Inc Building		141 (43)	12	1917	Industrial	The tallest building in Billings and Montana from 1917 until 1977.
5	Granite Tower		130 (40)	11	1975	Office	The tallest office building in Billings from 1975 to 1977. Designed by Harrison G. Fagg and Associates.
6=	Northern Hotel		129 (39)	10	1942	Hotel	Underwent a major 30 million dollar renovation in 2013. Replaced the original 1902 hotel, which burned down in 1940. Has two mechanical floors above the main roof deck that are not parapet; if included, the floor count is 12.
6=	Rocky Plaza		129 (39)	10	1982	Residential	The tallest building outside of downtown Billings, and the tallest residential complex in the city. Located in Midtown.
6=	Sage Tower		129 (39)	10	1974	Residential	88-unit retirement complex.
9	Liberal Arts Building		126 (38)	8	1972	Office	Located at MSU Billings. The tallest education building in the Montana University System.
10	Yellowstone County Courthouse		108 (33)	8	1957	Office	The main administrative building for Yellowstone County. Home to the office of the Clerk of District Court, which provides administrative functions for the 13th Judicial District Court of Montana.
11	US Bank Tower		104 (32)	8	1956	Office	Bank and office building.
12	The Terrace			11	1972	Residential	

== Tallest under construction ==
This list includes buildings under construction in Boise that are planned to be at least 100 feet (30 m) tall as of 2026, based on standard height measurement. The "Year" column indicates the expected year of completion. Buildings that are on hold are not included.

Name	Height ft (m)	Floors	Year	Purpose	Notes
St. Vincent Regional Hospital	285 (87)	14	2029	Health	Will replace the older, adjacent Intermountain Health hospital facility.
Aeries	—	12	2028	Residential	Apartments for retired seniors at St. John's United on the West End.

== See also ==
- List of tallest buildings in Boise
- List of tallest buildings in Denver
