= Tui Alailefaleula =

American football player (born 1982)

Profile
- Position: Offensive tackle

Personal information
- Born: November 5, 1982 (age 44); Anchorage, Alaska, U.S.
- Listed height: 6 ft 3 in (1.91 m)
- Listed weight: 350 lb (159 kg)

Career information
- High school: Bartlett (Anchorage, Alaska)
- College: Washington (2001–2005)
- NFL draft: 2006: undrafted

Career history

Playing
- New York Giants (2006); New York Jets (2007)

Coaching
- Bartlett HS (AK) (2021–present) Defensive coordinator

Tuiaualuma Alailefaleula (born November 5, 1982) is an American former football offensive and defensive tackle and current coach. He played college football for Washington, where he played on the offensive line. He signed as an undrafted free agent by the New York Giants. Injured in the 2006–2007 NFL season Tui was later cut by the Giants then signed by the New York Jets. Later released on waivers, Tui now works as a youth counselor at the McLaughlin Youth Center in Anchorage, Alaska and is an assistant football coach and offensive line coach at Bartlett High School, where he went to high school. He also plays offensive tackle for the Alaska Wild of the Indoor Football League.
