= Sections of Billings, Montana =

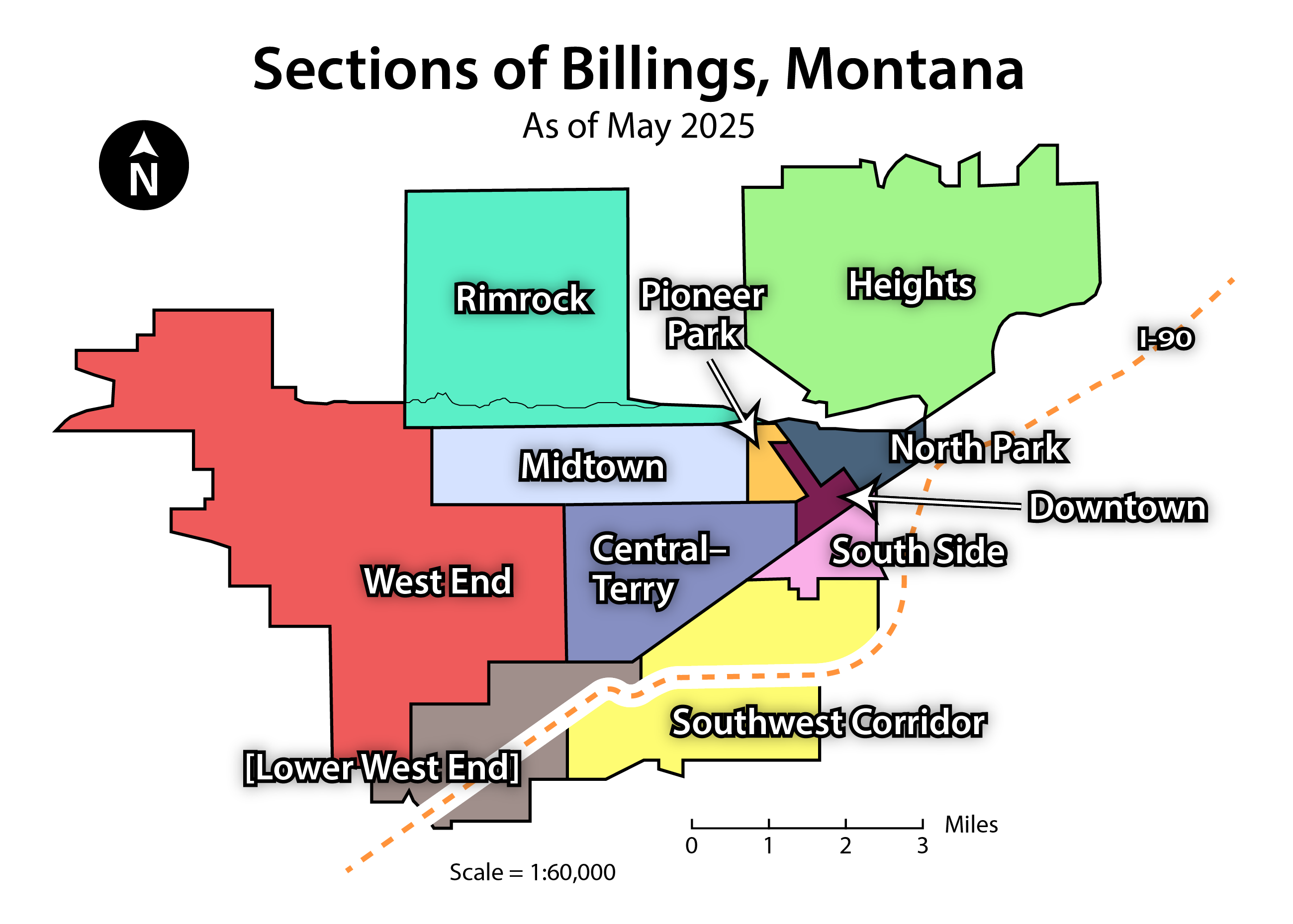
Sections of Billings, Montana

The city of Billings, Montana is subdivided into 10 sections for geographic and planning purposes.

== Sections ==
=== Downtown ===
Downtown Billings is the city's urban and civic core. It is generally located north of the South Side and railroad tracks, west and south of the North Park area, and east of Division Street. It adjoins the medical corridor along North 27th Street/Montana Highway 3 (MT 3), which is anchored by Billings Clinic and St. Vincent Regional Hospital.

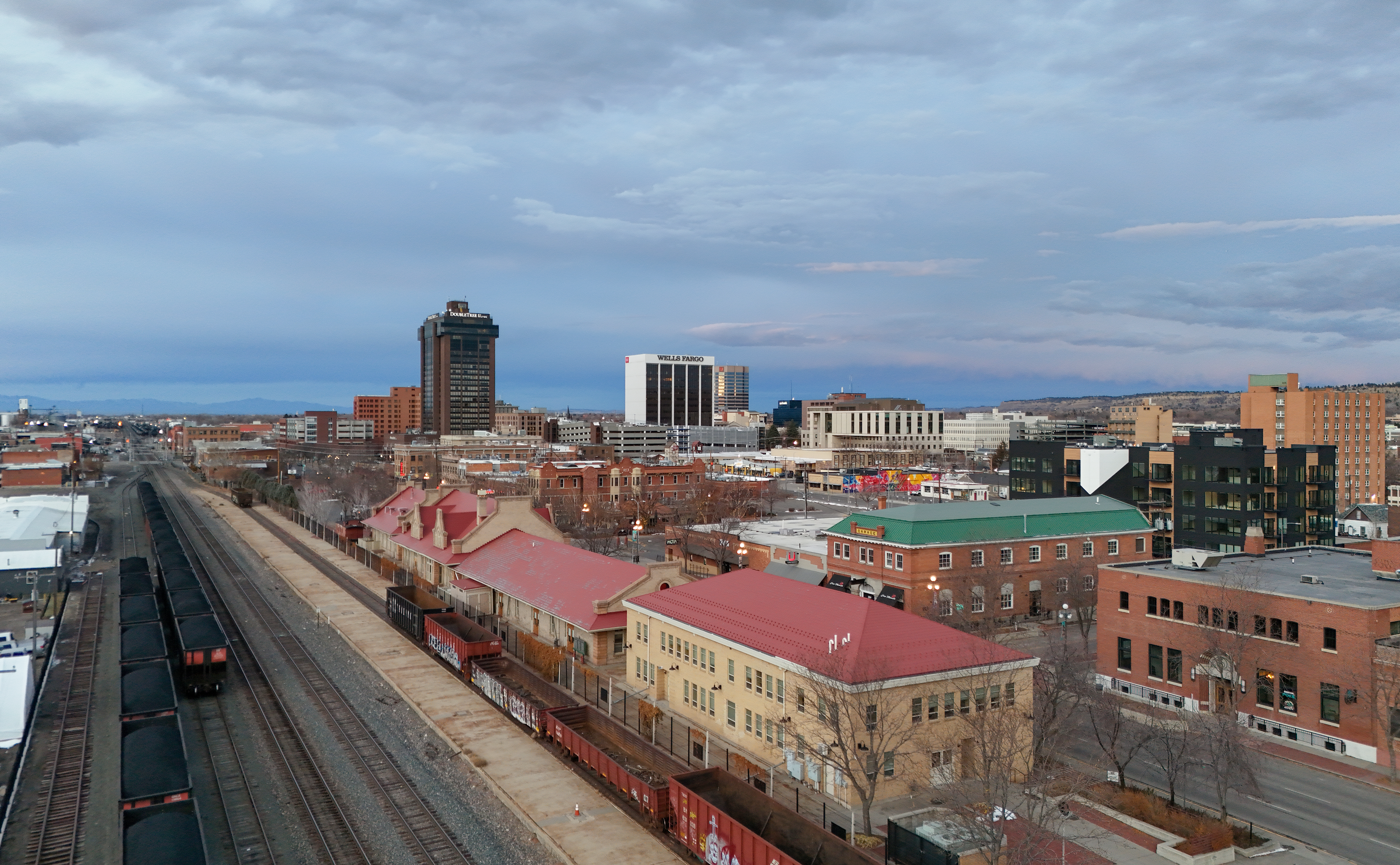
Downtown Billings as seen from the Billings Depot, 2024

The core of downtown is the pedestrian-friendly area clustered around Skypoint, which includes retail, offices, residential properties, hotels, and churches. Directly adjacent is the historic corridor along Montana Avenue and the railroad; this is the oldest part of the city. West of the core is a less dense area anchored by St. Patrick's Co-Cathedral.

Downtown landmarks include Billings City Hall, the Yellowstone County Courthouse, the Western Heritage Center, the Yellowstone Art Museum, and the Alberta Bair Theater. Most of Billings' tallest buildings are downtown, led by First Interstate Center, the tallest building in Montana.

=== South Side ===
The historic South Side, 2026 (sugar beet plant in background)

The South Side is a historic, triangularly shaped neighborhood across the railroad tracks from Downtown Billings. It is primarily residential, with houses on smaller lots, and retains some of the oldest buildings in the city. From early on, the neighborhood drew immigrant populations because of the nearby sugar beet factory. These immigrants were primarily of African, Chinese, Mexican, and German descent. Billings' first school was located on the South Side, and South Park was the city's first park.

South 27th Street (MT 3) runs through this neighborhood, connecting Interstate 90 (I-90) to Downtown. The area east of South 27th Street is largely industrial, with occupants including the Montana Women's Prison and the Billings Refinery (Phillips 66).

=== North Park ===
The North Park neighborhood is east of North 27th Street/MT 3, south of the BBWA Canal along the Rimrocks, and north of Montana Avenue. The neighborhood's namesake North Park was developed in 1902 and served as the city's original fairgrounds; the former fairgrounds pavilion is now an apartment building at 602 North 22nd Street. North Park's founding spurred early residential development in the area, and further houses, along with apartments, were constructed on the northern side of the neighborhood after it was subdivided in the 1960s.

Dehler Park is adjacent to the North Park neighborhood.

==== East Billings ====
East Billings, 2026

East Billings—the portion of the North Park neighborhood south of 6th Avenue North—is largely industrial because of its proximity to the railroad and I-90. However, it also includes some scattered commercial and residential properties. It is simultaneously considered an extension of Downtown, as it serves as a corridor between the urban core and the MetraPark fairgrounds and arena. Property owners and the City of Billings have spearheaded revitalization efforts in East Billings since 2008.

=== Central–Terry ===
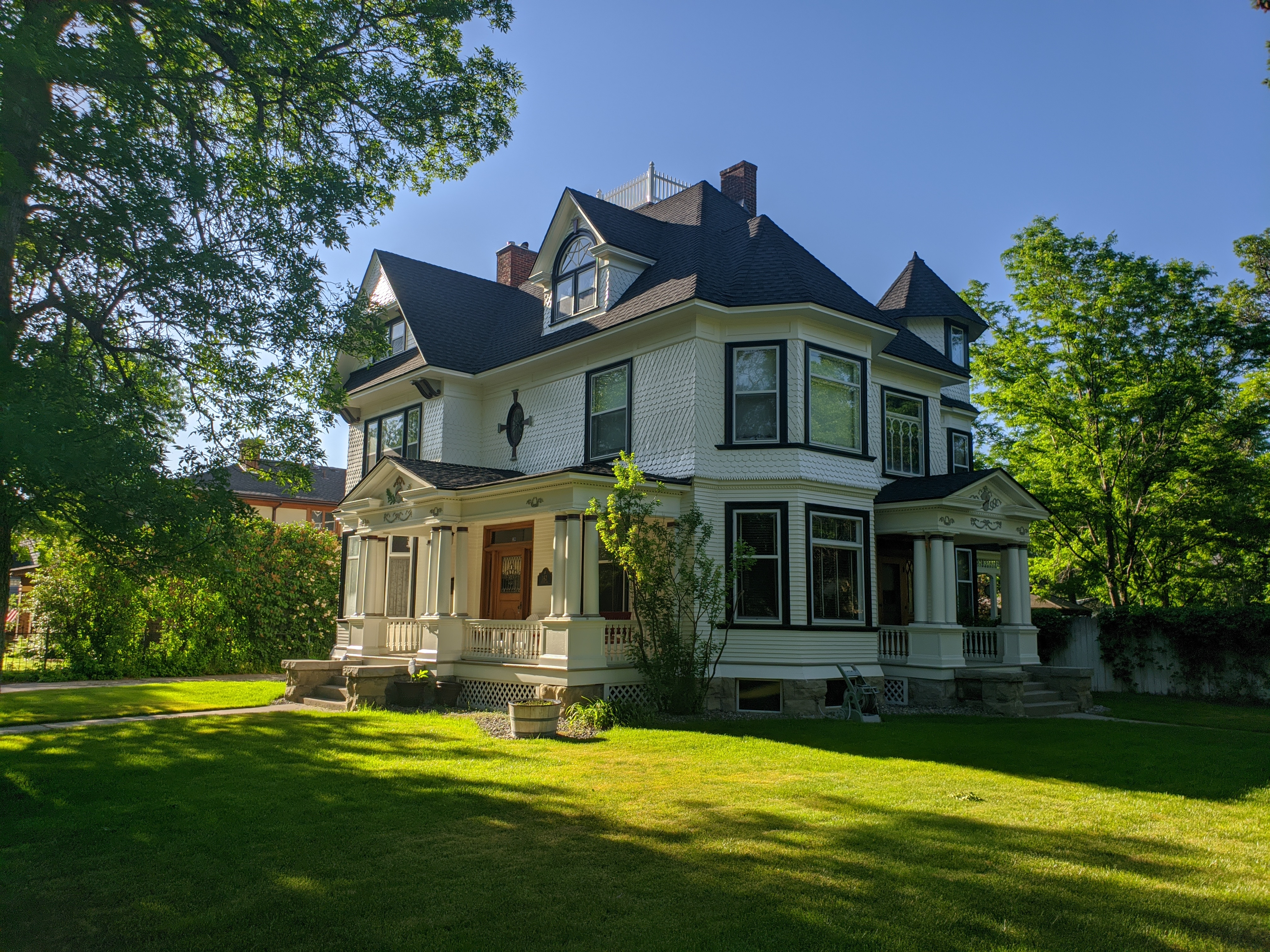
The Fratt-Link House on Clark Avenue, 2021

The Central–Terry Park neighborhood is bordered by Downtown to the east, Grand Avenue to the north, 24th Street West to the west, and Montana Avenue/Laurel Road to the south. However, the neighborhood name originally referred to the area directly around Central and Terry Parks.

Development in this area began in 1889 with the opening of the original St. Vincent's Hospital, and was stimulated by the construction of the Moss Mansion. The older core of the neighborhood was largely completed prior to World War II. Today, Central–Terry is primarily residential, with commercial properties along major roads and some industrial uses south of Central Avenue. The portion of Clark Avenue closest to downtown is known for its architecturally significant historic homes built by Billings' affluent early residents.

Mountview Cemetery is in the Central–Terry Park neighborhood near West High School. Billings Central Catholic High School is on the neighborhood's eastern edge.

=== Pioneer Park ===
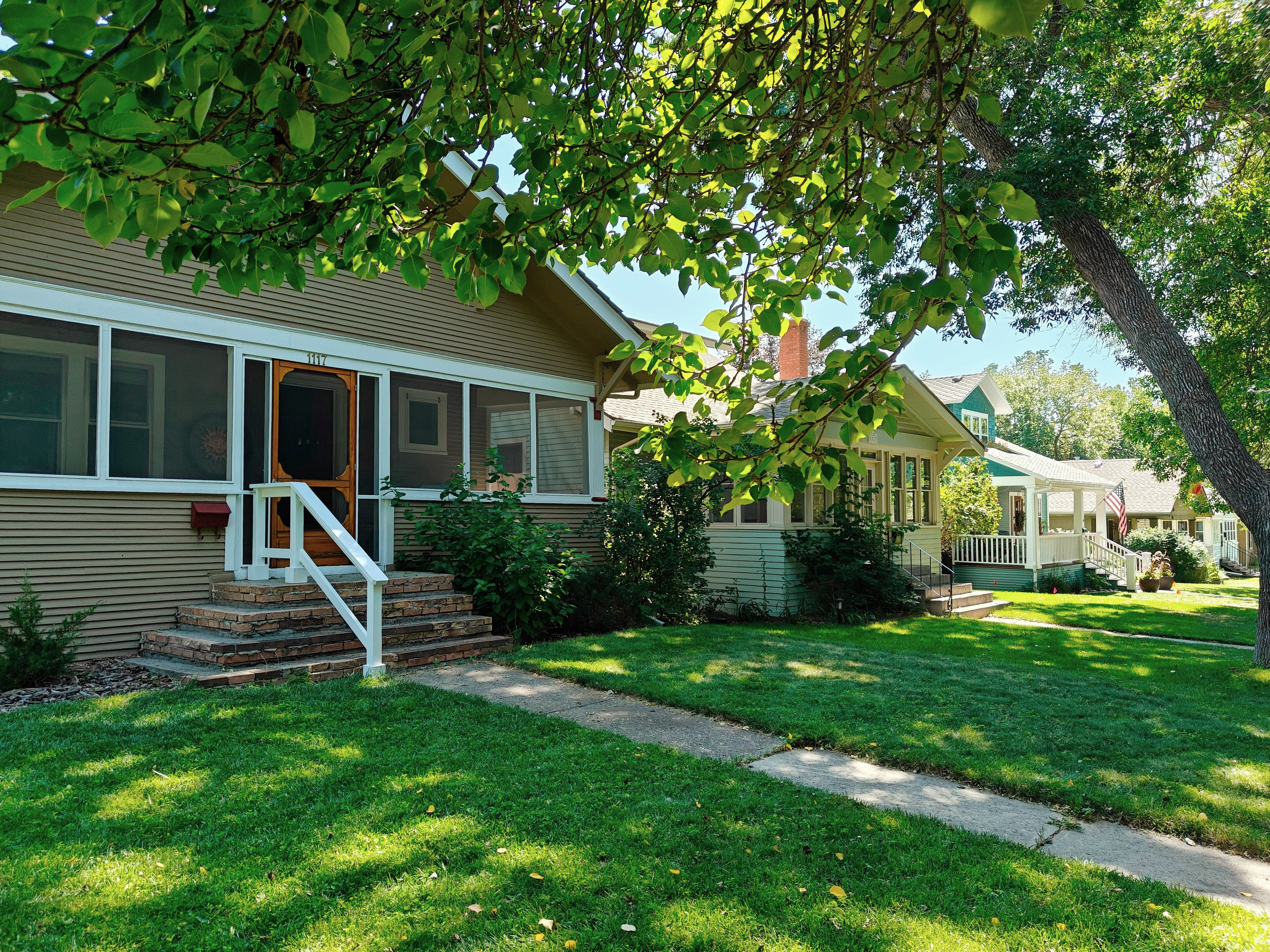
Homes in Pioneer Park's North Elevation District, 2025

The Pioneer Park neighborhood is bordered by Downtown to the east, Rimrock Road to the north, Virginia Lane to the west, and Grand Avenue to the south. It is the site of Pioneer Park, Billings Senior High School, and Montana State University Billings.

The east portion of the neighborhood, next to the medical corridor and Downtown, is the North Elevation District. This neighborhood was platted beginning in 1904, and was fully developed by the 1940s. Many of the older homes are now part of the North Elevation Historic District.

=== Midtown ===
Midtown is bordered by Grand Avenue to the south, Virginia Lane to the east, Rimrock Road to the north, and 38th Street West to the west. Rocky Mountain College is on Midtown's north side. To the south is the former West Park Plaza, which was built on Grand Avenue in 1961 as Montana's first enclosed shopping mall. It has since been renovated into a smaller strip mall.

=== Rimrock ===
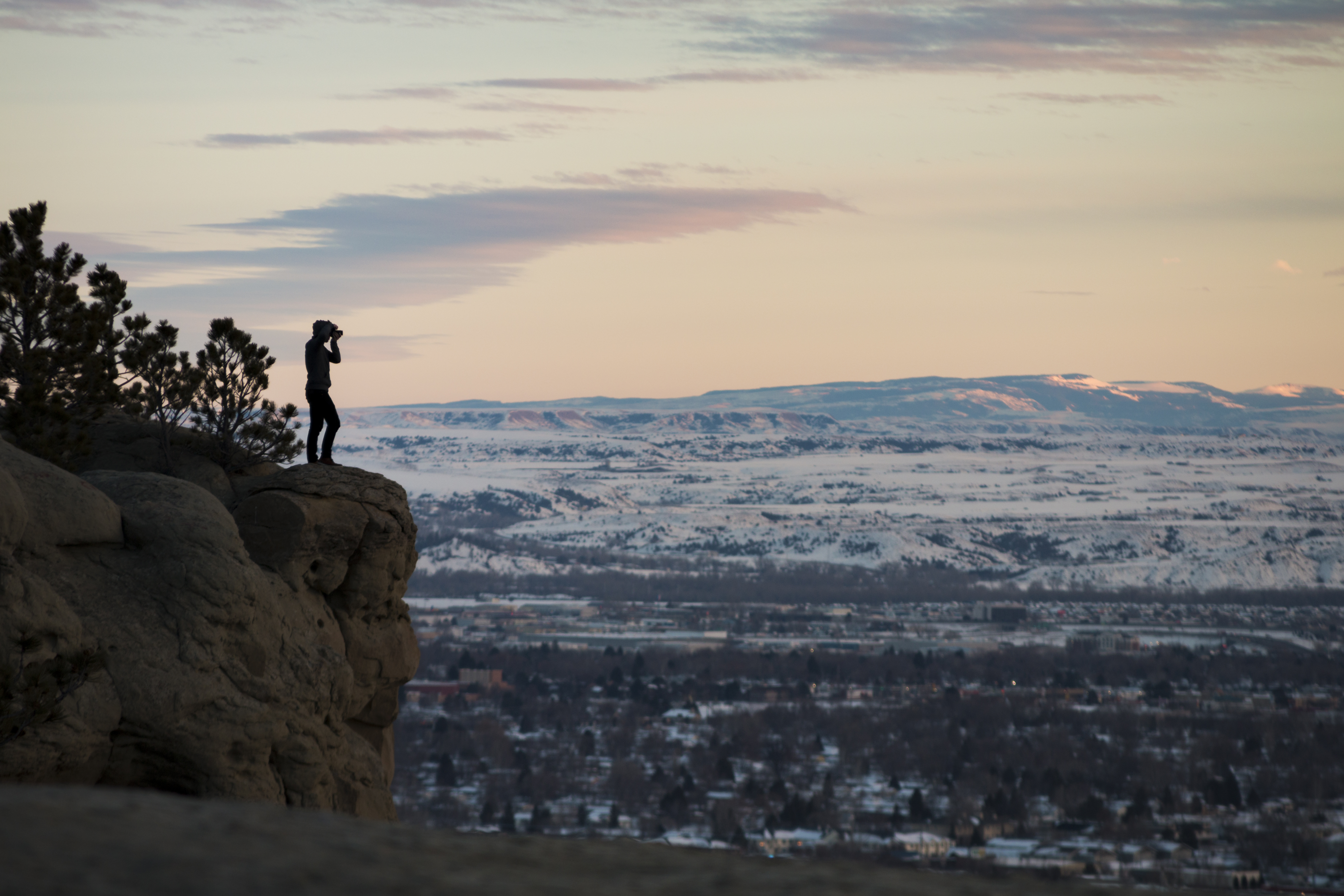
Billings from atop the Rimrocks, 2017

The Rimrock neighborhood includes the residential subdivisions between the base of the Rimrocks and Rimrock Road, as well as the sparsely developed area along Skyway Drive near Billings Logan International Airport.

=== West End ===
The West End neighborhood is generally located west of 24th Street West and Midtown, south of the Rimrocks, and north of the commercial/industrial areas along West King Avenue. Though formerly farmland, the West End is now largely characterized by urban sprawl from Billings' westward expansion, with many single-family homes on large lots in subdivisions. Between 2000 and 2025, the population grew by nearly 160%. New growth has been stimulated by retail development on Montana Highway 302 (Shiloh Road), which has roundabouts at every major intersection.

The West End is the site of Rimrock Mall, the Rocky Vista University Billings campus, and City College.

==== Lower West End ====
Adjacent to I-90, this area is primarily commercial and industrial. It includes ZooMontana, large retail stores along King Avenue West, and the Kampgrounds of America headquarters. This area is generally considered part of the West End, though it is not within the boundaries of that neighborhood's task force.

=== Southwest Corridor ===
The Southwest Corridor is the general area south of State Street and southeast of Montana Avenue/Laurel Road. It includes a mix of residential, commercial, and industrial uses. The area is bisected by I-90. Several large retail stores and some restaurants are clustered by the I-90 exit, near Amend Park, which includes soccer fields, a four-court fieldhouse, and the two-sheet Signal Peak Ice Arena.

The Josephine Crossing and Annafeld subdivisions are south of I-90 near the Yellowstone River.

=== Heights ===
Main Street entering the Billings Heights, 2026

The Heights is northeast of the Rimrocks from Downtown. It is bordered by the Yellowstone River on the east, across which it is connected to Lockwood by the Billings Bypass. Because of its geographic separation from the rest of the city, the Heights is a distinct suburban neighborhood with its own community identity.

The east side of the Heights was historically called the Billings Bench, with farmland irrigated by the Billings Bench Water Association Canal. The transition from farmland to suburbs began after World War II ended, when returning veterans and their families were drawn to the affordable land in the area. The Heights was annexed into Billings in the 1980s.

Businesses are primarily clustered along Main Street/U.S. Route 87. Skyview High School, Centennial Ice Arena, and Lake Elmo State Park are located in this neighborhood.

== Suburbs ==
Lockwood is a Billings suburb outside the city limits. It is located across the Yellowstone River east of MetraPark and the Heights. The population was 7,195 at the 2020 census. Lockwood is the location of the Billings Refinery (Par Pacific).

Other census-designated places considered Billings suburbs include Huntley and Shepherd.

== See also ==
- Billings Metropolitan Area
- Timeline of Billings, Montana
