= Delvin Myles =

American gridiron football player and coach (born 1972)

No. 20
- Position: Wide receiver / defensive back

Personal information
- Born: January 14, 1972 (age 54); Anchorage, Alaska, U.S.
- Listed height: 5 ft 10 in (1.78 m)
- Listed weight: 190 lb (86 kg)

Career information
- High school: Bartlett (AK)
- College: Oklahoma State
- NFL draft: 1995: undrafted

Career history
- Winnipeg Blue Bombers (1997–1998); Anaheim Piranhas (1997); Portland Forest Dragons (1999); Los Angeles Avengers (2000–2001); Oklahoma Wranglers (2002); Bakersfield Blitz (2003); Central Valley Coyotes (2004); Alaska Wild (2008)

Career AFL statistics
- Receptions: 8
- Receiving yards: 82
- Tackles: 86
- Interceptions: 10
- Touchdowns: 1
- Stats at ArenaFan.com

Delvin Myles (born 1972) is an American former professional football wide receiver and defensive back. He played college football for the Oklahoma State Cowboys.

== Early life ==
Myles attended Bartlett High School in Anchorage, Alaska and was a student and a letterman in football. In football, he was an All-Conference selection and an All-State selection.

== College career ==
Myles played college football at the College of the Desert and then transferred to Oklahoma State University.

== Professional career ==
Myles played in the Canadian Football League for the Winnipeg Blue Bombers (1997–1998), in the Spring Football League for the Los Angeles Dragons (2000), in the Arena Football League for the Anaheim Piranhas (1997), the Portland Forest Dragons (1999), the Los Angeles Avengers (2000–2001), and the Oklahoma Wranglers (2002) and in the af2 for the Bakersfield Blitz (2003), Central Valley Coyotes and the Alaska Wild. He was a player-coach for theWild in the Intense Football League.

== Coaching career ==
In 2024, Myles served as defensive coordinator for the Oregon Blackbears of the failed third incarnation of the Arena Football League. In 2025, he was hired for the same position with the Oregon Lightning of Arena Football One, where he previously coached from 2021 to 2023 when they were the Oregon High Desert Storm of the now-defunct American West Football Conference. On August 28, 2025, Myles was hired as new defensive coordinator of the Washington Wolfpack.
