= Bill Cole (Montana politician) =

American politician and attorney

44th Mayor of Billings
- In office January 2, 2018 – January 5, 2026
- Preceded by: Tom Hanel
- Succeeded by: Mike Nelson

Personal details
- Born: Bozeman, Montana, U.S.
- Spouse: Anne Remmer
- Children: 2
- Education: Dartmouth College (BA); Columbia University (JD)

Bill Cole is an American politician who was the mayor of Billings, Montana from 2018 to 2026.

== Early life and education ==
Cole was born and raised in Bozeman, Montana. He earned a bachelor's degree in history from Dartmouth College and received his Juris Doctor degree from Columbia Law School. Cole and his wife, Anne, returned to Billings in 1991, where he practiced law, and she is a professor at the Montana State University Billings campus.

== Career ==
Before entering local politics, Cole practiced real estate, land use, and commercial contracts law. He also served as chair of the Billings Chamber of Commerce.

=== Mayoralty ===
Cole was elected mayor of Billings on November 7, 2017, succeeding two-term mayor, Tom Hanel, who was term-limited. In the election, Cole faced member of the Montana Senate, Jeff Essmann, defeating him by 7,000 votes. He took office on January 2, 2018. Much of his mayoralty was spent dealing with the COVID-19 pandemic and he encouraged residents of Billings to take the COVID-19 vaccine. During his time as mayor Centennial Park was constructed, an $11.6 million was granted for the construction of the Skyline Trail and Skyway Drive, and he passed two public safety levies property tax. Cole announced his intention to run for re-election on April 22, 2021.

Political offices
Preceded by Tom Hanel	Mayor of Billings; 2018–2026	Succeeded by Mike Nelson
