= Bartlett High School (Alaska) =

Coordinates: 61°13′56″N 149°44′03″W

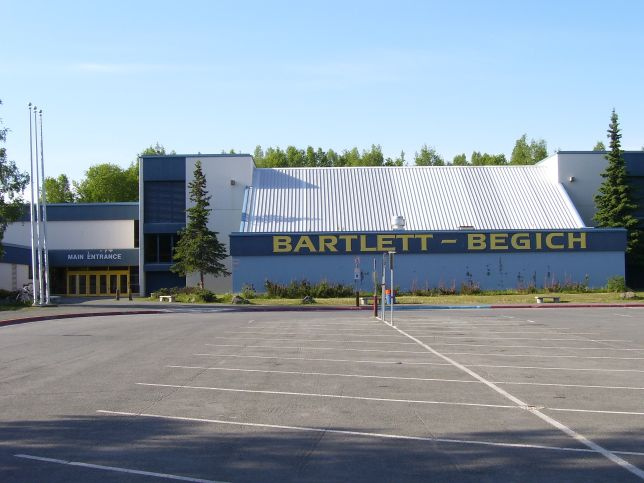

Location
- 1101 Golden Bear Drive; Anchorage, Alaska 99504; United States

Information
- Type: Public, 4-year
- Established: 1973 (53 years ago)
- School district: Anchorage School District
- CEEB code: 020001
- Principal: Sean Prince
- Faculty: 70.25 (FTE)
- Student to teacher ratio: 20.16
- Colors: Blue and gold
- Song: Notre Dame Victory March
- Mascot: Golden bear
- Website: www.asdk12.org/bartlett

Bartlett High School is a high school in Anchorage, Alaska. It had an enrollment of 1,416 as of the 2023-2024 school year. Construction started in 1971, and the first classes were held in 1973. The school originally housed both Bartlett High School, named after U.S. Senator Bob Bartlett, and Begich Junior High School, named after U.S. Representative Nick Begich.

Bartlett is part of the Anchorage School District and is accredited by the Northwest Association of Schools and Colleges. Its attendance area is northeast Anchorage and Elmendorf Air Force Base, and approximately 25% of its students are military dependents. The student body is racially and ethnically diverse. About 43.7% of the students are white, 18.9% are black, 6.1% are Hispanic, 13.5% are Asian/Pacific Islander, and 17.8% are American Indian/Alaska Native.

The school district's 2003-2004 Profile of Performance reported three goals: "Improve school climate" (attained), "increase percentage of students passing HSGQE Math by 5%" (partially attained) and "reduce dropout rate" (attained). The dropout rate in 2003-4 was 7.3%.

Bartlett is classified as a 4A school by the Alaska School Activities Association.

== History ==
Bartlett High School was designed by architects CCC/HOK Architects and Planners and Manley & Mayer of Anchorage.

Bartlett High School was heavily damaged during the 7.0 earthquake that occurred on November 30, 2018.

== Name of school ==
Like other senior-junior school complexes in the Anchorage School District during the 1960s to the early 1970s, the complex housing Bartlett was originally given two names. One was for the senior high school, and the other for the junior high school. In line with this, the complex housing Bartlett was called Bartlett-Begich, denoting Bartlett High School (named after Sen. Bob Bartlett) and Begich Junior High School (named after Rep. Nick Begich). During the late 1970s and early 1980s, the Anchorage School Board began to change all of these complexes into high schools and to create separate junior high schools (now known as middle schools) as new facilities could be constructed, in each case moving the original junior high school name as the new junior high school was built. Hence, the complexes formerly known as Chugiak-Gruening became Chugiak High School and Gruening Middle School, Service-Hanshew became Service High School and Hanshew Middle School, and so on.

At the time the school now named Benny Benson Secondary School (an alternative school originally paired as a junior high with East High School, opened in 1991) was designed and built, it was not anticipated that a junior high school in the northeast Anchorage area would be built. The family of Nick Begich was asked if they would like the new facility named after Begich (rather than Benny Benson), but the family asked rather that the Begich name remain on the Bartlett High School building until a new junior high could be built in the area, with the assumption that Begich's name would be transferred to that school. Thereafter, "Bartlett-Begich" remained technically associated with the school building, but Begich's name was not used on Bartlett High School diplomas, in official documents, or in Anchorage School District communications regarding the school; it was retained only in the words "Bartlett - Begich" painted on the southeast wall of the high school building.

In November 2006, the Anchorage School Board made official that the name of a new middle school in Anchorage would be named after Begich. Begich Middle School opened for classes on August 22, 2007.

== Notable alumni ==
- Tui Alailefaleula (2001), former NFL player for the New York Giants and the University of Washington
- Tom Anderson (1985), lawyer, consultant, politician, and talk radio host, key figure in Alaska political corruption probe
- Zackary Bowman (2003), former NFL player for the Chicago Bears, former player for the Nebraska Cornhuskers
- Mario Chalmers (2005), former NBA player, 2× NBA champion, hit game-tying 3-point shot in the 2008 National Championship Game with 2.1 seconds left in the 2nd half while playing at the University of Kansas
- Johnny Ellis (1978), former majority Leader of the Alaska Senate
- Delvin Myles, former football player in the Arena Football League
- Doron Perkins (2001), professional basketball player, 2009 Israeli Basketball Premier League MVP
- Amerie Mi Marie Rogers (1996), singer popularly known as Ameriie
- Brian P. Schmidt (1985), Nobel Prize laureate (physics), astronomer, vineyard owner
