= Cascade Bancorp =

Bank of the Cascades is the principal subsidiary of Cascade Bancorp (NASDAQ: CACB). Headquartered in Bend, Oregon, it was founded in 1977. It co-sponsored the Bank of the Cascades Center, a 4,000-seat arena in Redmond, Oregon. It announced in 2016 it would be acquired by First Interstate BancSystem of Montana for $589 million. The acquisition was completed May 30, 2017.
