= Billings Bench Water Association Canal =

Canal in Montana, United States

Coordinates: 45°51′20″N 108°27′56″W

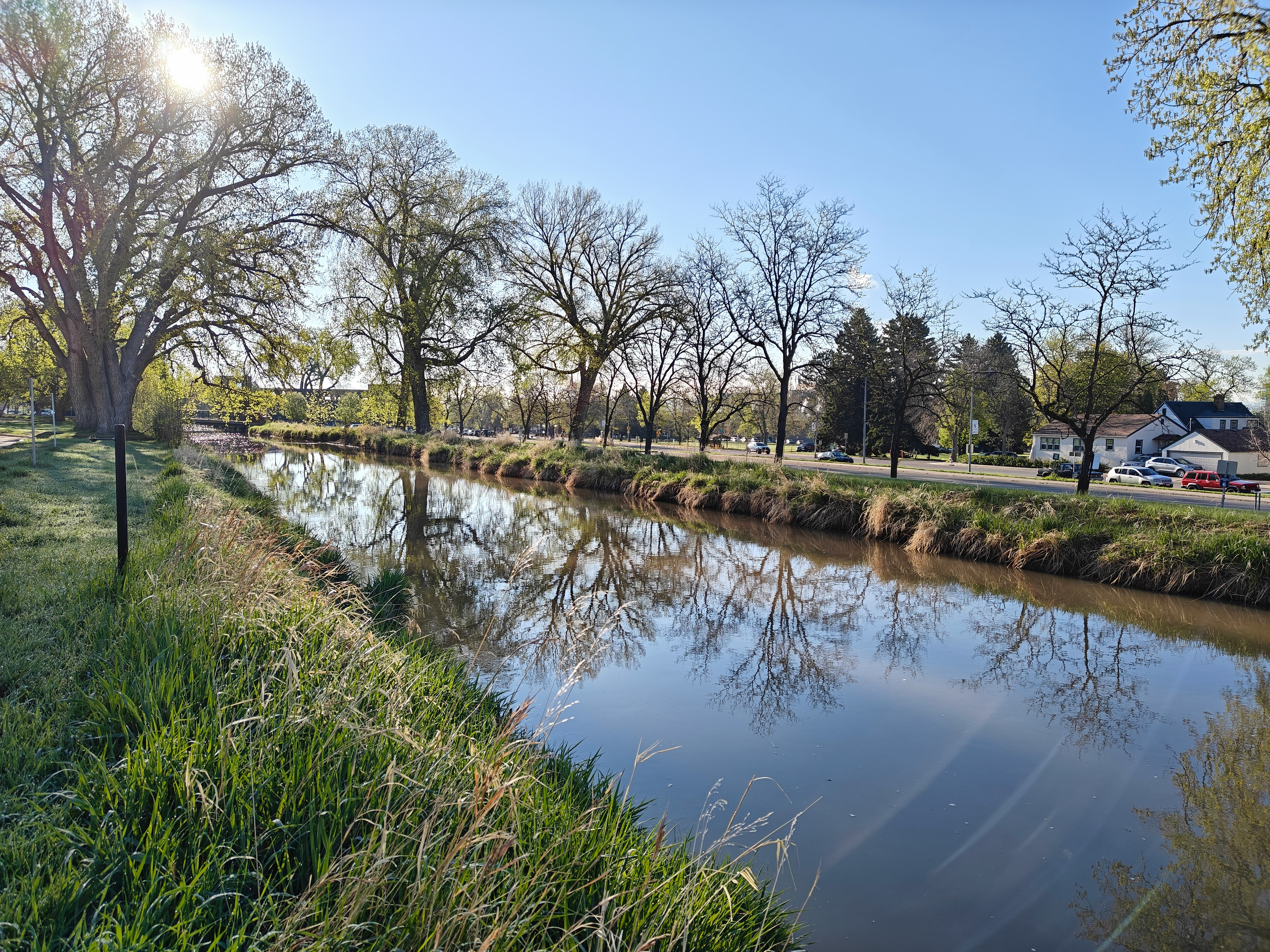
A portion of the BBWA Canal on the MSU Billings campus.

The Billings Bench Water Association Canal, also referred to as the Billings Canal and built as the Billings Land & Irrigation Canal, (Note: The canal is often referred to as "The Big Ditch." However, this name technically refers to another local ditch, the M&M Canal.) is an irrigation ditch that starts at the Yellowstone River in Laurel, Montana. It runs through Billings, Montana, then flows via tunnel under the Rimrocks into the Billings Heights before ending at the Yellowstone River near Shepherd, Montana.

The nonprofit Billings Bench Water Association (BBWA) has operated the canal since 1915. It is largest ditch in Billings and a crucial water source for agriculture in the area between Billings and the Huntley Project.

== History ==
The oldest major irrigation ditch in Billings is the M&M Canal, which Henry W. Rowley conceived prior to the platting of the townsite. (Note: "M&M" is a reference to the Minnesota and Montana Land and Improvement Company, the railroad subsidiary that platted the original Billings townsite.) Built in 1883, this ditch was intended to attract farmers to the area, and to draw interest from financial backers. The M&M Canal was officially renamed the Big Ditch in 1900, but it was eclipsed several years later by a wider and longer ditch—the eventual BBWA Canal—that would serve not only the west Billings area, but land to the northeast as well.

=== Construction ===
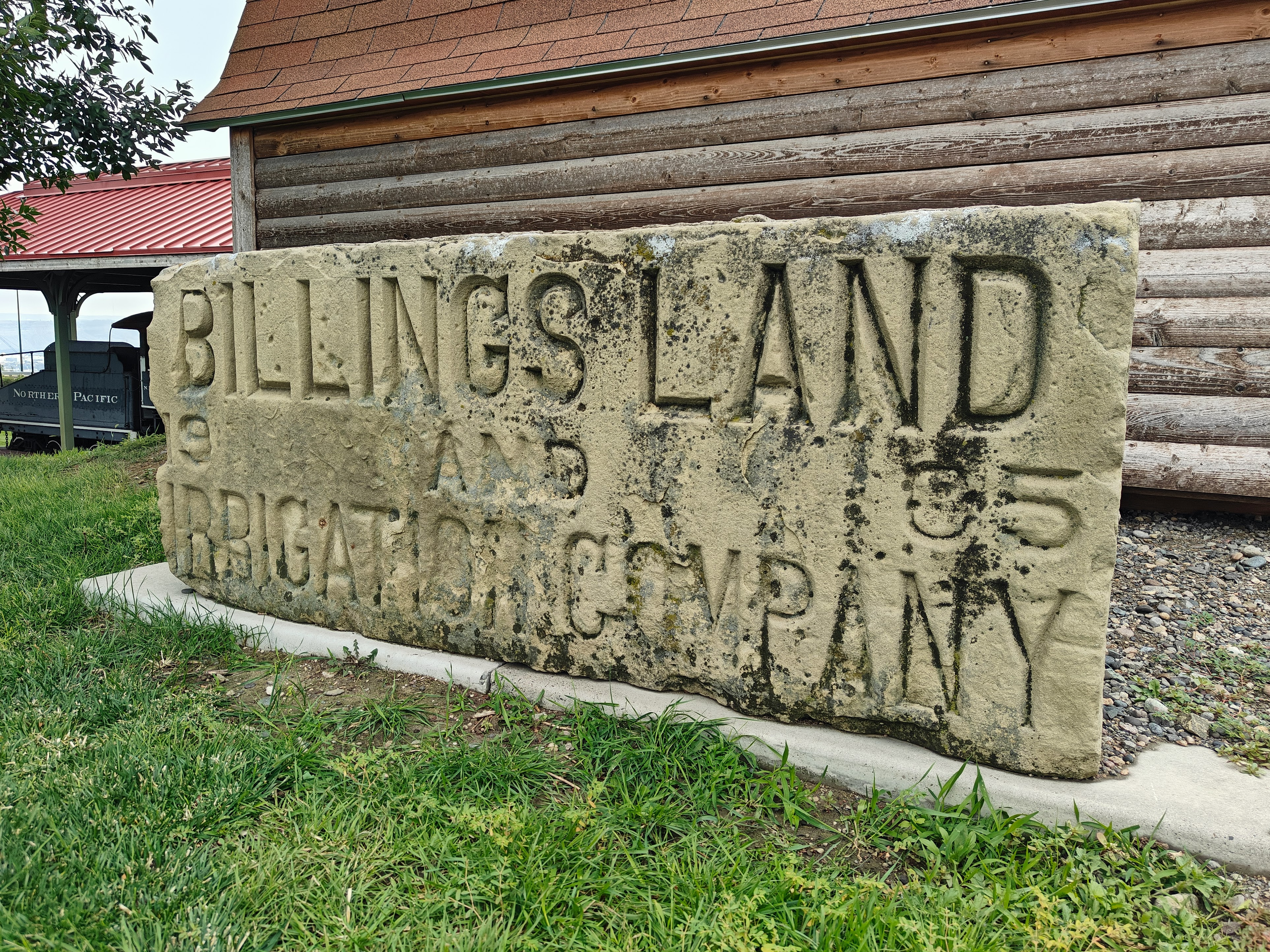
The original inscription stone from the Rimrocks tunnel.

The Billings Land & Irrigation Company was incorporated in 1903 with the intent to provide water to landowners in the Billings Bench area north of downtown, and beyond to the Huntley area. In January 1904, the company filed a water right for 600 cubic feet (17 m^{3}) per second flowing through the Yellowstone River. The original plans called for the canal to pass by the Rimrocks and Boothill Cemetery before heading north toward the Bench; however, irrigation specialist Marvin Chase recommended a shorter route that would cut through the Rimrocks via tunnel.

The Billings Land & Irrigation Company awarded the contract for tunnel construction to H. W. Rowley, who broke ground in December 1903. The tunnel was bored from both ends simultaneously. Upon its completion about a year later, the tunnel was 1,847 feet (563 m) long, 15 feet (4.6 m) feet high at some points, and up to 20 feet (6.1 m) wide. The canal construction necessitated the construction of further infrastructure, such as bridges and a large wooden flume over Alkali Creek. Because horses could not pass through marshy areas, the Company purchased a steam shovel to build these canal sections.

=== 1900s ===
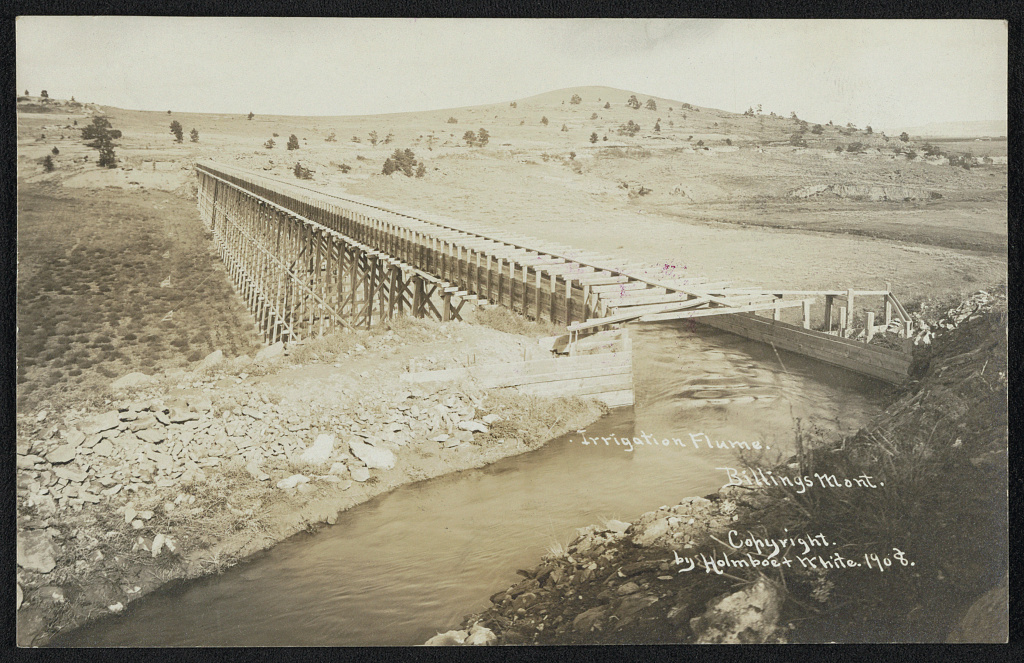
The since-demolished flume across Alkali Creek, 1908.

The canal was legally deemed complete in 1905. A few years late, the canal manager lost his job when Bench farmers blamed a 1908 canal break on his negligence.

The Land & Irrigation Company's successor, the Billings Bench Water Association, was incorporated on September 24, 1915 by 38 landowners along the canal route. The BBWA has operated continuously since that time. The following year, high winds blew down the wooden flume over Alkali Creek. It was replaced by a wooden siphon tube.

The canal's route through Billings changed over the years as the city developed. A notable break north of downtown in July 1924 caused severe flooding, motivating the BBWA to move the canal closer to the Rimrocks and line that section with concrete. The canal broke in approximately the same spot in 1933, but was repaired quickly. The canal broke again on the night of June 11, 1937, after it filled with water from 48 hours of intense rainfall. Various other ditches and creeks overflowed on the same night. The ensuing flood engulfed Billings' downtown and caused several million dollars' worth of damage.

In the 1970s, the wooden siphon tube over Alkali Creek—which had been rebuilt after it was washed away by the 1937 flood—began to leak. It was demolished and replaced by an underground concrete siphon. In 1986, the beams that supported the tunnel for the canal underneath the Rimrocks were replaced.

=== 2000s ===
In August 2016, the canal banks breached near Alkali Creek, disrupting upstream agriculture and prompting over $1 million in repair work. In 2021, the canal slipped about a foot downhill near the entrance to the tunnel. This portion of the canal was stabilized in 2023. The same year, Montana governor Greg Gianforte visited the canal to promote a disaster mitigation bill.

In 2024, the City of Billings broke ground on a second municipal water treatment plant, located on the West End near ZooMontana. The BBWA Canal will supply water to the plant and its two accompanying reservoirs. The water treatment plant is slated for completion in late 2026.

=== Deaths ===
Over the years, the BBWA Canal has been associated with various deaths. During the construction of the tunnel, a man was killed in a blasting powder accident. A 5-year-old boy drowned in the canal in Billings in 1980. In 2010, a man drowned in the canal near Shepherd. In 2020, the body of a 45-year-old man was found floating near Billings' Meadowlark School, and another man's body was discovered in the canal near Lake Elmo in 2024. (Note: This list is not comprehensive.)

== Description ==
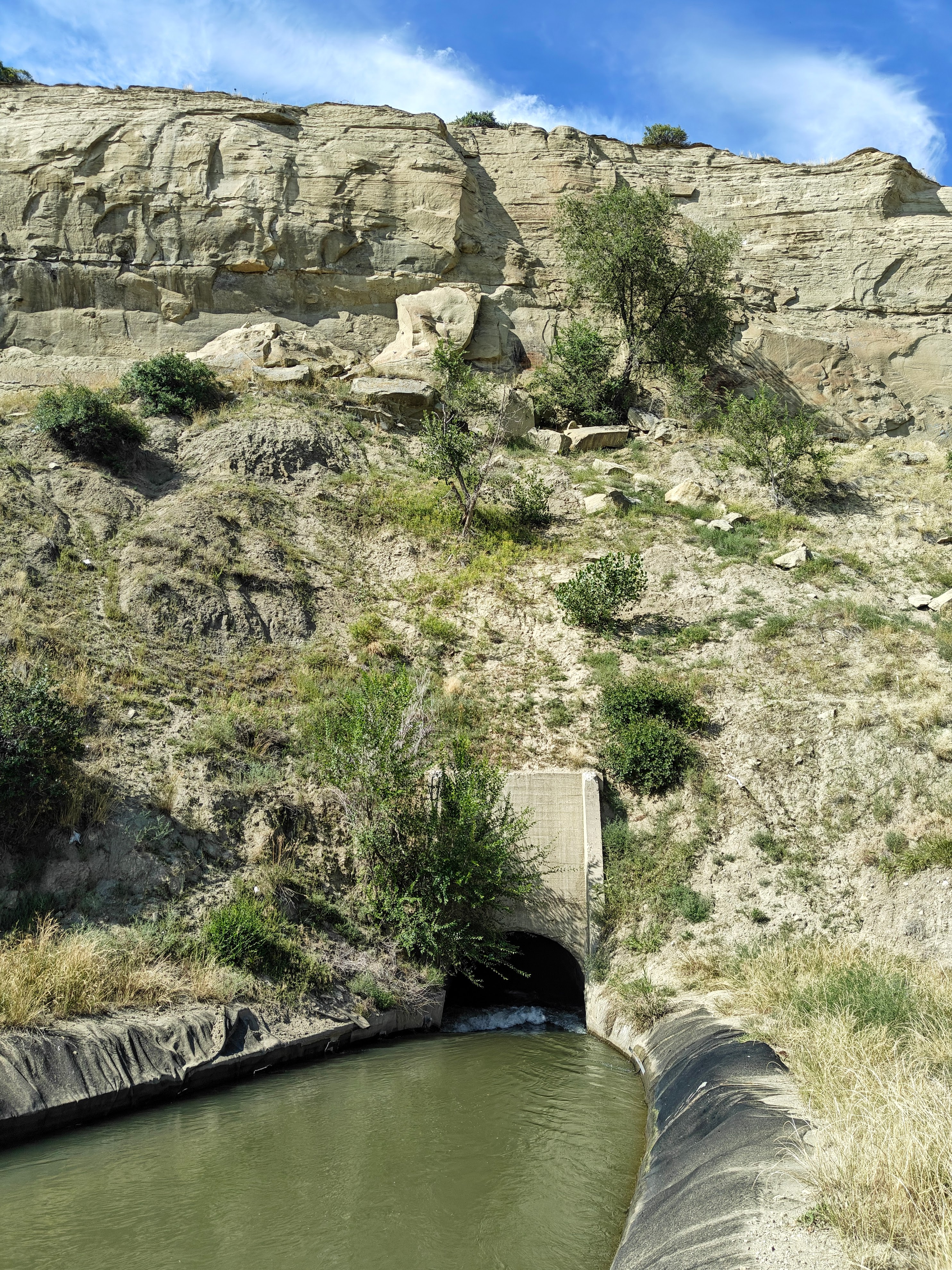
The southern mouth of the BBWA tunnel through the Rimocks.

The main line of the BBWA Canal is 63 miles (101 km) long, with over 200 miles (320 km) of branching laterals. The canal serves around 1,200 users, who serve as the shareholders of the nonprofit Billings Bench Water Association. Every year, the water flow is turned on around April 15 and runs until October 15. The water flow measures between 200 and 600 cubic feet (5.7 and 17.0 m^{3}) per second.

The BBWA system's water is largely used to irrigate agricultural fields totaling 18,000 acres (7,300 ha). It is also used for golf courses, private yards, and public parks. The Montana State University Billings campus is at least partially watered by the canal, which runs through it.

Despite some modernization efforts over the decades, most of the canal's infrastructure still dates from 1940 and earlier, including a wooden flume over Canyon Creek and the tunnel through the Rimrocks. The canal flowed almost entirely through rural areas when it was built, but Billings' growth since then means the canal now flows directly through multiple neighborhoods. Because of the damage that water breaches could cause to the city and surrounding area, the Canal Association staff perform regular monitoring and maintenance.

=== Reservoirs ===
The BBWA Canal feeds two reservoirs. The first is Lake Elmo, a 64-acre (26 ha) public reservoir in the Billings Heights that offers swimming, boating, paddle boarding, and fishing. (Note: In older sources, Lake Elmo is called by its prior name, Holling Reservoir.) Lake Elmo supplies domestic water to a 113-home community north of Billings. The second reservoir fed by the BBWA Canal is Rattlesnake Reservoir north of the Heights. In the future, the canal will feed two additional reservoirs that will supply water to the Billings West End water treatment plant.
