= Great Western Bank (South Dakota) =

Former Regional bank

Great Western Bancorp, Inc.
- Trade name: Great Western Bank
- Type: Public
- Traded as: NYSE: GWB (2004-2022)
- Industry: Financial services
- Founded: 1935; 91 years ago
- Defunct: February 1, 2022; 4 years ago
- Fate: Acquired by First Interstate BancSystem
- Successor: First Interstate Bank
- Headquarters: Sioux Falls, South Dakota, United States
- Key people: Kevin P. Riley, President & CEO
- Products: Financial services
- Total assets: $32.00 billion
- Number of employees: Nearly 1,500 (2012)
- Website: Last snapshot of website prior to merger

Great Western Bank, whose holding company was Great Western Bancorp, Inc. (NYSE: GWB), was a regional bank based in Sioux Falls, South Dakota, United States. There were over 170 locations in Arizona, Colorado, Iowa, Kansas, Minnesota, Missouri, Nebraska, North Dakota and South Dakota. In September of 2021 they announced a merger with First Interstate BancSystem and completed it in February of the following year. Great Western Bank had assets of $12.39 billion at the time of its merger.

== History ==
Great Western Bank's charter began in 1935 with the establishment of the Farmers and Merchants Bank in Watertown, South Dakota. The bank's name was changed to Great Western Bank in 2003. It was acquired by National Australia Bank in 2008. In October 2014, NAB began to release its holding through an initial public offering. NAB sold its final listing in July 2015.

In 2010, Great Western took over the failed Lincoln, Nebraska-based TierOne Bank. In November 2015, Great Western announced the acquisition of Sioux Falls-based HF Financial Corp., the parent company of Home Federal Bank.

In 2021, Great Western Bank signed a definitive agreement to merge with Montana-based First Interstate BancSystem. The merger was completed on February 1, 2022, making Great Western an operating division of First Interstate Bank; Great Western locations became First Interstate Bank branches on May 23, 2022.
