= Northern Hotel =

Coordinates: 45°46′55″N 108°30′18″W

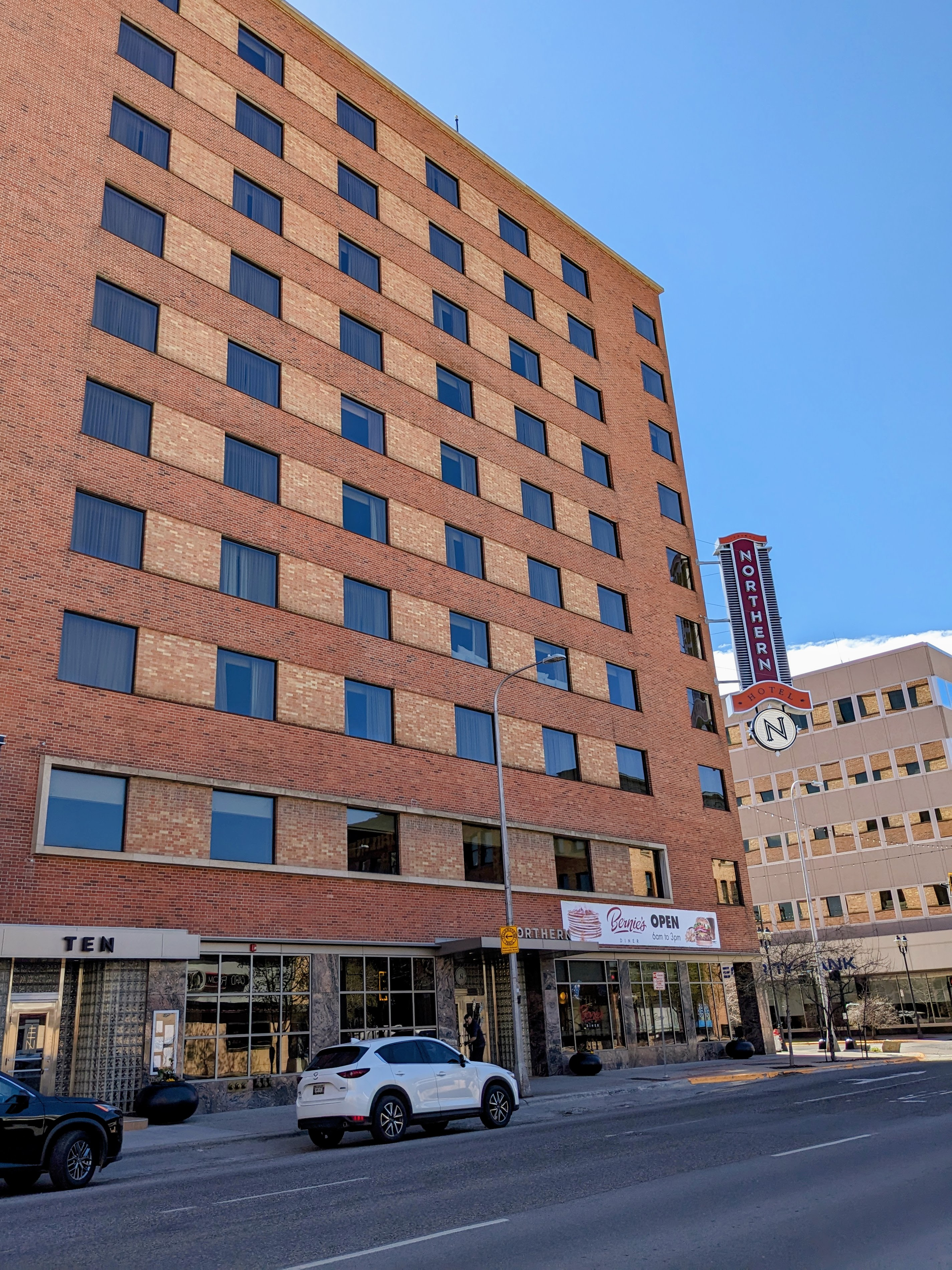

General information
- Location: Billings, Montana

Height
- Antenna spire: none
- Roof: 129 ft (39 m)
- Top floor: 10

Technical details
- Floor count: 12; 10 regular and 2 mechanical
- Lifts/elevators: 2
- Northern Hotel
- U.S. National Register of Historic Places
- Location: 19 N Broadway, Billings, Montana
- Built: 1942
- Architect: Holabird & Root
- NRHP reference No.: 13000369
- Added to NRHP: 21 June 2013

Other information
- Number of rooms: 160

Northern Hotel is a historic hotel located at 19 North Broadway in the downtown core of Billings, Montana, United States.

== History ==
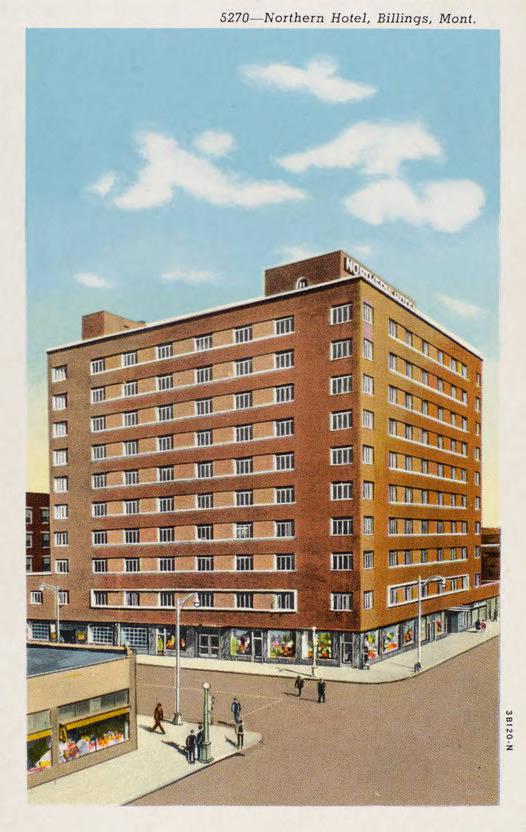
Northern Hotel, 1940s

Construction of the original three-story Northern Hotel was begun in 1902 by two of Billings' early business tycoons, P.B. Moss and Henry W Rowley. The hotel was completed and opened in 1904. It hosted celebrities including Theodore Roosevelt, Woodrow Wilson and Prince (later King) Olav V of Norway and his wife Princess Märtha of Sweden. The original structure was completely destroyed by a massive fire on September 11, 1940. Other downtown structures were threatened, although a five-and-a-half-hour battle with the fire saved the other buildings, and all the hotel's guests were evacuated with no serious injuries.

Construction of the current ten-story replacement Northern Hotel structure, designed by Holabird & Root, began in April 1941. The hotel was completed and reopened on July 7, 1942. The hotel joined the Western Hotels chain on November 1, 1950. The chain was renamed Western International Hotels in 1963. The hotel left the chain on February 21, 1972.

In September 2006, the Northern Hotel closed and in January 2009, the structure was sold at auction. Under new ownership and management the building was stripped back to the beams and completely remodeled. The hotel had its grand opening on March 16, 2013. The hotel was fit with the latest technology, making it one of the most advanced hotels in the country. The four star hotel has been called the finest hotel in Montana. The hotel contains multiple meeting and conference rooms, a ballroom, 160 guest rooms, a gym, a boutique gift shop, and two restaurants: TEN, a fine dining restaurant, and Bernie's Diner. The Northern's four level parking garage was torn down and the city of Billings built a new six level, block long, mixed use parking structure directly south of the Northern Hotel. The hotel has approximately 185 slots available to guests, as well as valet services.

== See also ==
- List of tallest buildings by U.S. state
- List of tallest buildings in Billings
