= DoubleTree by Hilton Hotel Billings =

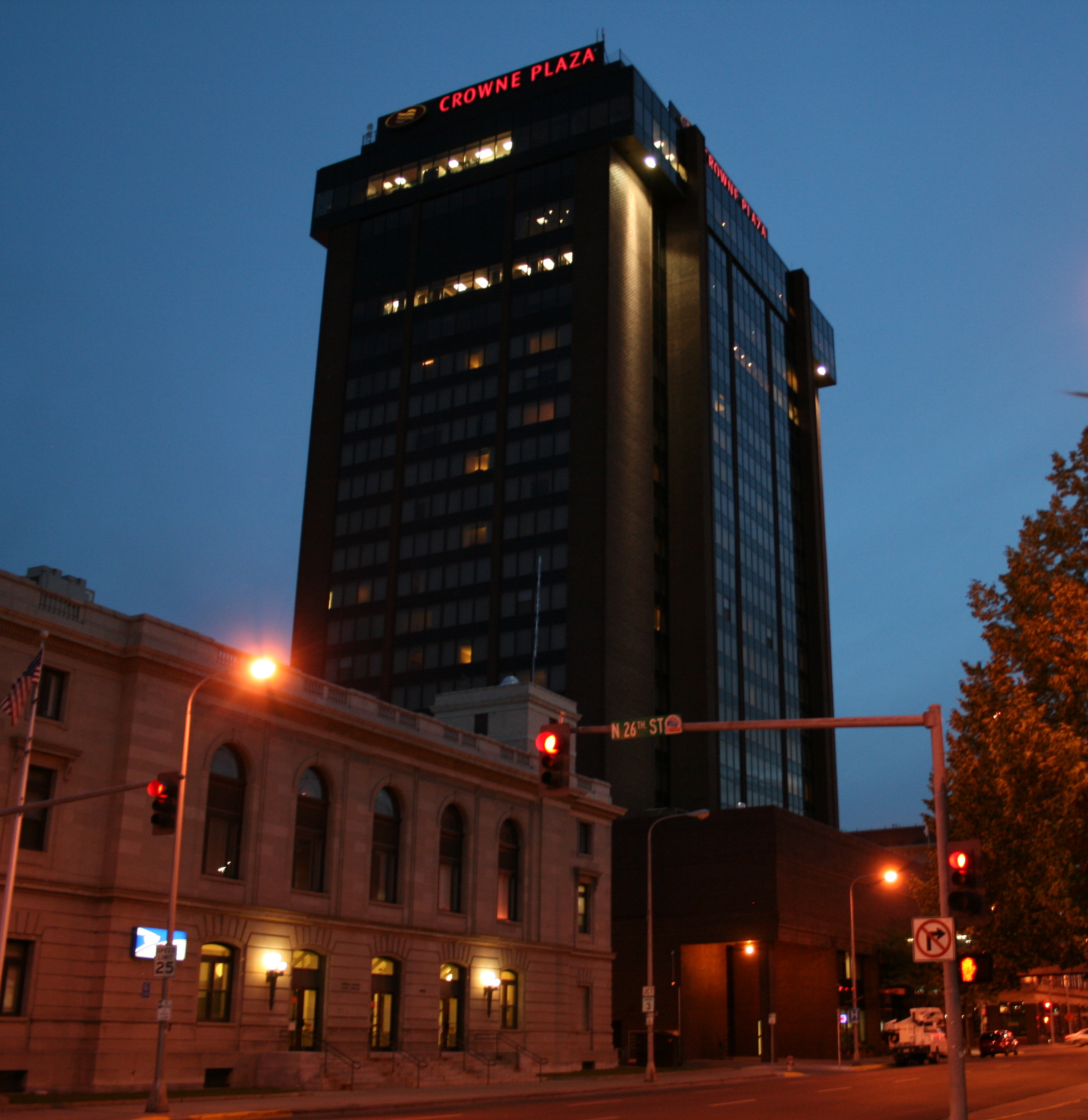
- Interactive map of the DoubleTree by Hilton Hotel Billings area

Record height
- Tallest in Montana from 1980 to 1985^{[I]}
- Surpassed by: First Interstate Center

General information
- Type: Hotel, Restaurant
- Location: 27 North 27th Street, Billings, Montana, United States
- Coordinates: 45.78215°N 108.50368°W
- Construction started: 1979
- Completed: 1980

Height
- Antenna spire: 256 ft (78 m)
- Roof: 245 ft (75 m)

Technical details
- Floor count: 22
- Lifts/elevators: 6 guest and 2 service

Design and construction
- Architects: Harrison G. Fagg & Associates

The DoubleTree by Hilton Hotel Billings is a high-rise hotel in the Downtown Business District of Billings, Montana, United States. At 245 feet (75 m), it is the second-tallest building in the northern Rocky Mountain region and was the tallest from 1980 to 1985 until the completion of the First Interstate Center, also in Billings. It is the tallest hotel in Montana. Upon its completion in 1980, the building was declared the tallest load-bearing brick structure in the world by the Brick Institute of America. (Note: In a Billings Gazette article published on November 22, 2014, Brian Trimble of Brick Industry Association also claimed that the building is the tallest load-bearing brick masonry building in the world.) However, the Guinness World Records awards that title to Chicago's Monadnock Building.

== History ==
Construction started on the Sheraton Billings Hotel in 1979 and it opened in September 1980. The hotel was renamed Crowne Plaza Billings in 2006, and then DoubleTree by Hilton Hotel Billings in 2016.

The DoubleTree is unusual among high-rises in that it is built almost entirely of bricks in an applied masonry facade; the structure contains 2,372,982 red clay bricks that were formed in an 1869 kiln.

The building has twenty two above ground floors with a fine dining restaurant on the twentieth floor. It is connected to a seven level city parking garage and the historic grand building via sky bridges. In 2016, the name changed from ″Crowne Plaza″ to ″DoubleTree by Hilton.″

== See also ==
- First Interstate Center
- List of tallest buildings in Billings
- List of tallest buildings by U.S. state

== Notes ==
Preceded by Wells Fargo Plaza (Billings)	Tallest Building in Billings & Montana; 1980–1985; 75m	Succeeded by First Interstate Center
