= Jeff Essmann =

American politician

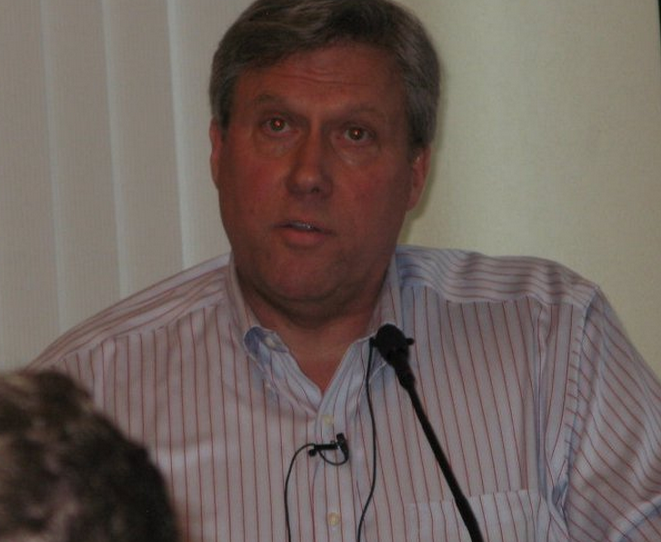

President of the Montana Senate
- In office January 7, 2013 – January 5, 2015
- Preceded by: Jim Peterson
- Succeeded by: Debby Barrett

Member of the Montana Senate from the 28th district
- In office January 2005 – January 5, 2015
- Preceded by: John Bohlinger
- Succeeded by: Tom Richmond

Personal details
- Born: June 29, 1952 (age 74) Billings, Montana, U.S.
- Party: Republican
- Spouse: Sherry Essmann
- Education: Illinois Institute of Technology; University of Montana, Missoula

Jeff Essmann (born June 29, 1952) is an American politician and a Republican former member of the Montana Senate. Essmann was appointed to the Montana Senate in 2005 to represent Senate District 28. He was subsequently elected in 2006, and reelected in 2010. Essmann served as the president of the Montana Senate from 2013 to 2015.

He is most notable for proposing Senate Bill 423 to legalize use of medical marijuana in Montana.

Essmann ran for governor of Montana in the 2012 election. He withdrew after it was determined that he lacked the necessary funds and support. He also ran in the 2017 Billings mayoral election, but was defeated by Bill Cole in the second round by a 28% margin.

Essmann served as the chairman of the Montana Republican Party from 2015 to 2017.
