= Lake Elmo State Park =

State park in Billings, Montana, U.S.

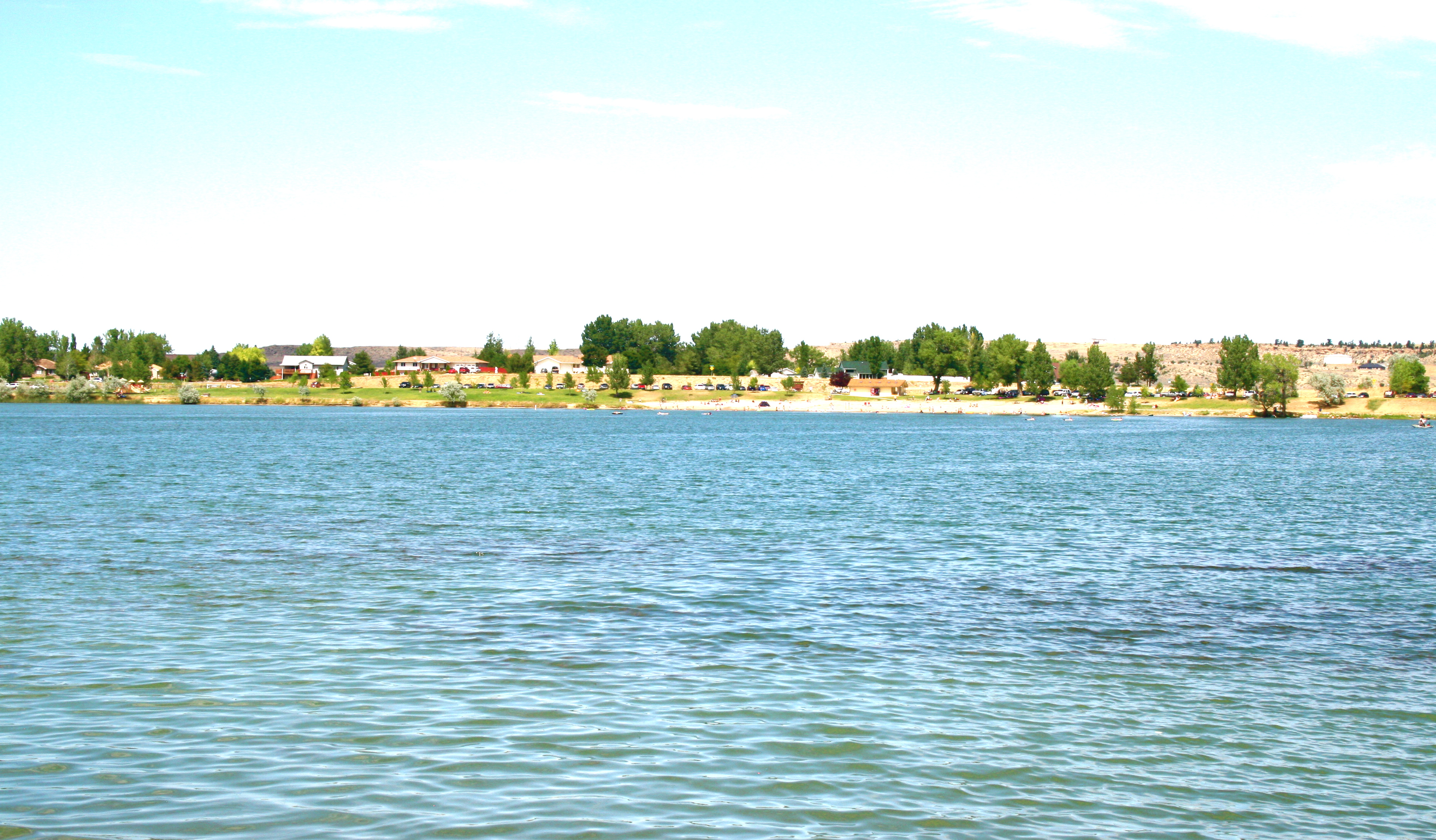
- Lake Elmo

- Location within Montana
- Location: Billings, Montana, U.S.
- Coordinates: 45°50′28″N 108°28′49″W
- Area: 123 acres (50 ha)
- Elevation: 3,199 ft (975 m)
- Designation: Montana state park
- Established: 1983
- Visitors: 165,041 (in 2023)
- Administrator: Montana Fish, Wildlife & Parks
- Website: Lake Elmo State Park

Lake Elmo State Park is a public recreation area located on the northeast side of Billings, Montana. The state park occupies 123 acres (50 ha) and is at an elevation of 3,199 feet (975 m). It offers swimming and non-motorized boating on a 64-acre (26 ha) reservoir, three beach-front areas, fishing pier, grassed multi-use areas, two group-use shelters, playground, and fenced-in dog park on the lake's west side. The reservoir is primarily fed by the Billings Bench Water Association Canal.
