= First Interstate Center =

Commercial skyscraper office building located in Billings Montana

- First Interstate Center in 2025

Record height
- Tallest in Montana since 1985^{[I]}
- Preceded by: DoubleTree by Hilton Hotel Billings

General information
- Status: Completed
- Type: Corporate offices
- Architectural style: Modern
- Location: Billings, Montana, U.S., 401 N 31st St
- Coordinates: 45.7835°N 108.5120°W
- Construction started: 1984
- Completed: 1985
- Opened: September 1985
- Cost: $20 million

Height
- Roof: 272 ft (83 m)

Technical details
- Floor count: 20
- Lifts/elevators: 6

Design and construction
- Architect: Opus Group
- Developer: Joel Long

Other information
- Parking: 750 spaces

Website
- locations.firstinterstatebank.com/mt/billings/401-n-31st-st.html

First Interstate Center is a signature commercial office building located in the Transwestern Plaza, a complex consisting of four office towers with a total of 35 floors (three 5-floor buildings and one 20-story tower), in the downtown core of Billings, Montana, United States. It is the tallest in the state of Montana and the tallest in the northern Rockies within the US. It was built in 1985 and rises to 272 feet (83 meters). It is used primarily for office space.

== Tenants ==
- First Interstate BancSystem

== See also ==
- First Interstate BancSystem
- List of tallest buildings in Billings
- List of tallest buildings by U.S. state

| Preceded by Crowne Plaza (Billings) | Tallest Building in Billings & Montana; 1985–Present; 83m | Succeeded by none |
