= Rimrocks =

Cliffs around Billings, Montana

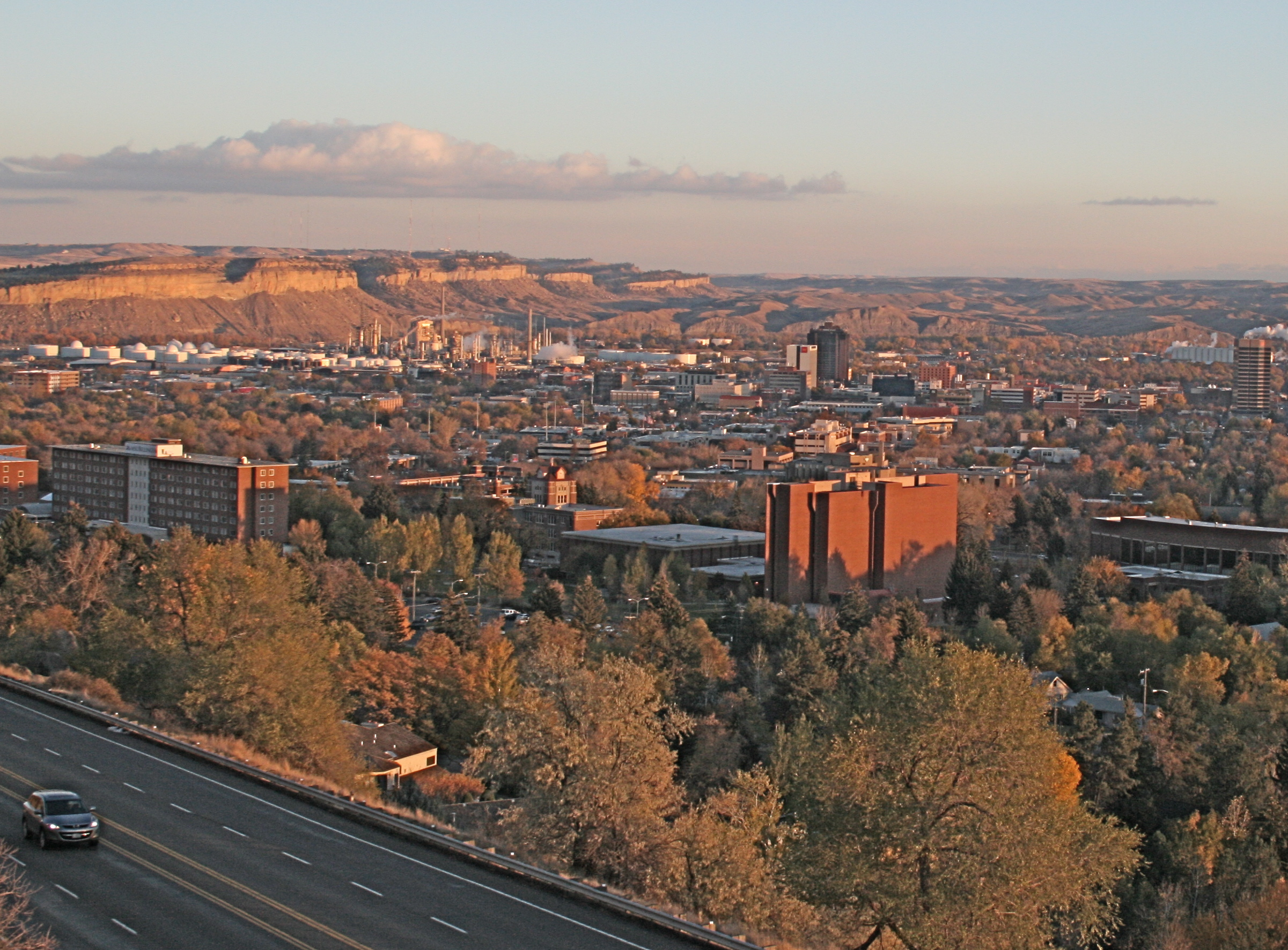
The East Rims. Image taken from the North Rims.

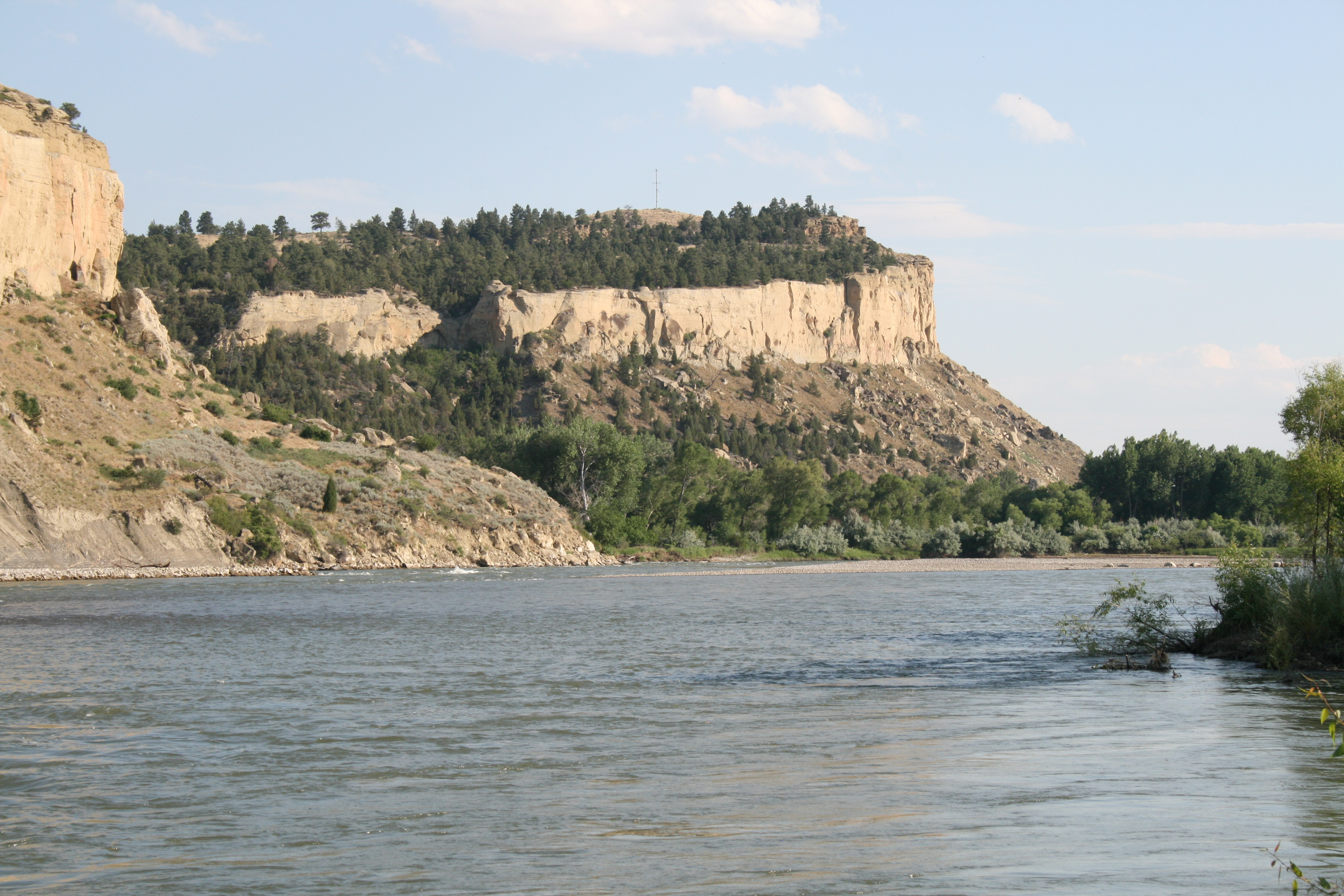
Sacrifice Cliff

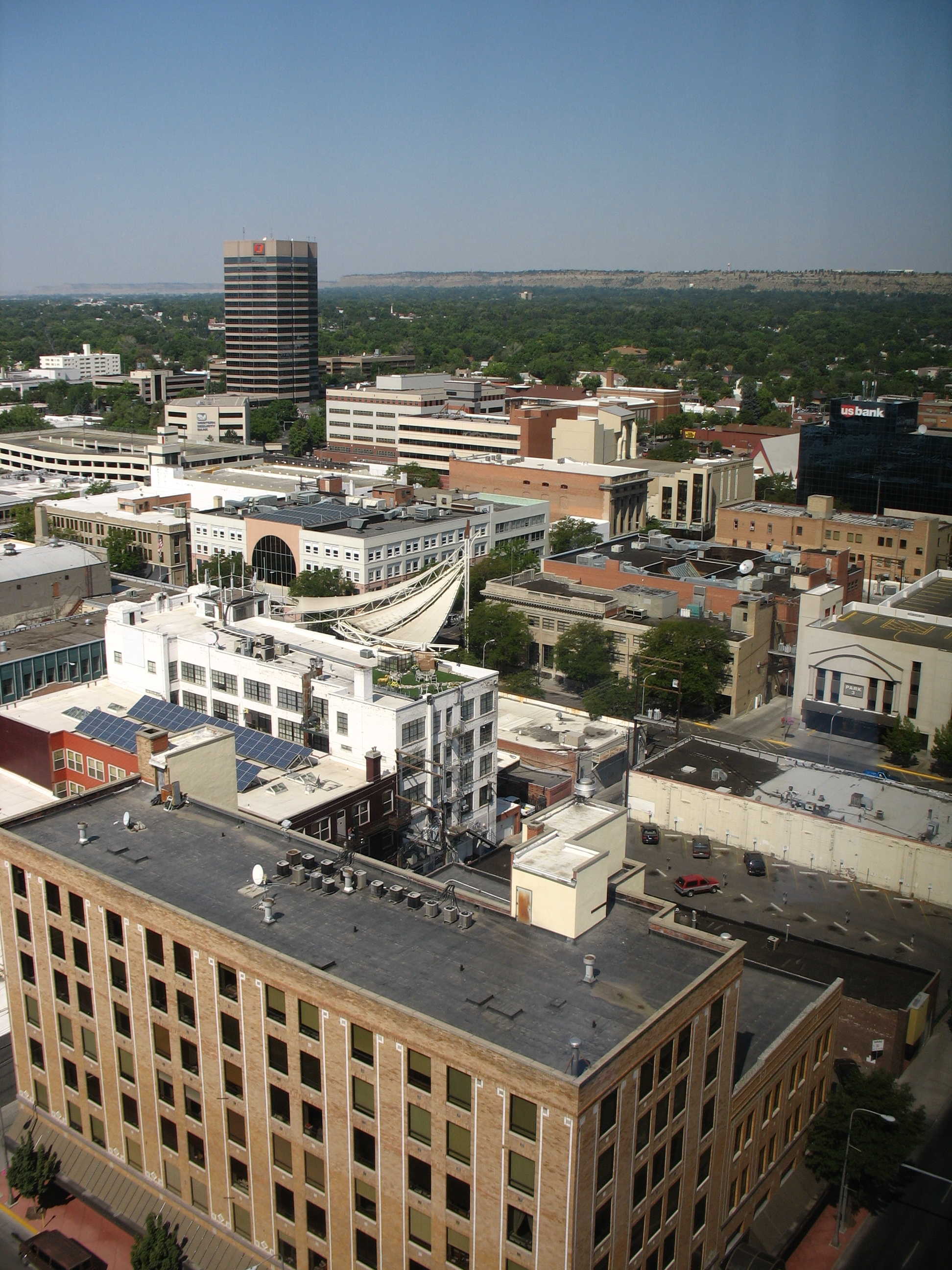
The first rise of the North Rims in the background

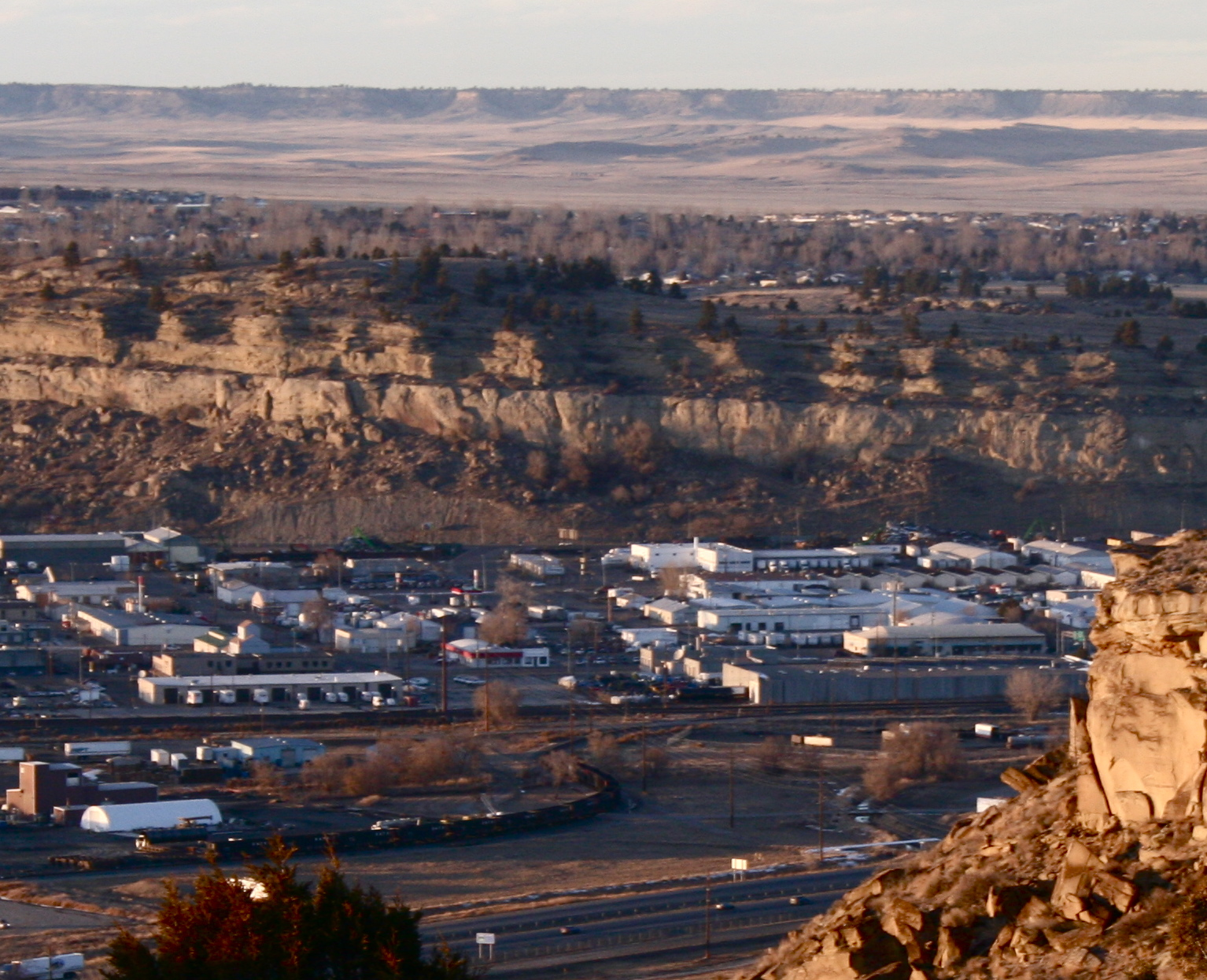
The first rise and, in the distance, the second rise of the North Rimrocks

The Rimrocks (also known as the "Rims") are geological rimrock sandstone formations that outcrop in sections of Billings, Montana.

Eighty million years ago the Billings metro area was the shore of the Western Interior Seaway, a sea that went from the present-day Gulf of Mexico to the Arctic North. Sediment and sand from the sea were deposited around the shoreline. Over time the sea rose and fell leaving behind a deep layer of sand. Over millions of years this sand was compressed into the sandstone the rims are made of. It is known as Eagle Sandstone.

Around a million years ago a much larger river than the current-day Yellowstone River began cutting a canyon into the valley floor of Eagle Sandstone, creating what today is known as the Rimrocks.

The river still continues to cut into the valley floor. This can be witnessed at the base of the Sacrifice Cliff and the Northern Edge of Briarwood Mountain in the South Hills.

The Rimrock's first Caucasian inhabitants were French traders that temporarily resided in the crevasses of the sandstone during the harsh winter of 1832. Veterans of the Napoleonic Wars, William Beshoar and Alexander Coumou were accompanied by Swedish and German businessmen Collin Holmberg and Andrew Strub. In the early 1940s a journal along with remnants of the group were discovered partially buried within the crevasses by geologists Kai Glidden and Kylar Bennett.

The North Rims border the West End, Rimrock, Pioneer Park, and North Park sections of the city. The East Rims border the eastern edge of the Downtown core, the South Hills and Briarwood sections of the city. Much of the Heights and Lockwood sit on top of the first rise of the Rimrocks. A second rise borders the eastern edge of Lockwood and also runs several miles north of the city and borders northeast sections of the city. The second rise is over 600 feet in places making the total from the valley floor to the top of the second rise over 1,400 feet in places. The tallest single section of the Rimrocks starts at the eastern border of the downtown area with a cliff known as Sacrifice Cliff and extends to the south for roughly 18 miles. This area is known as Coburn Hill.

In the late 1960s, concerned citizen Brooke Wirkkala with Better Billings organized a petition campaign to preserve the Rims in their natural state. When the group's effort's failed, the Billings Gazette published an editorial suggesting that the area be preserved as a national monument. The National Park Service considered the idea, but concluded that the Rimrocks were "of less than national significance."

== See also ==
- Sundance Sea
