= First Interstate BancSystem =

American Regional Financial Services Company

First Interstate BancSystem, Inc.
- Trade name: First Interstate Bank
- Company type: Public
- Traded as: Nasdaq: FIBK (Class A); Russell 2000 component; S&P 600 component
- Industry: Financial services
- Founded: 1968; 58 years ago, in Sheridan, Wyoming, United States
- Founder: Homer Scott, Sr.
- Headquarters: First Interstate Center; Billings, Montana, US
- Number of locations: 307 (2022)
- Key people: Stephen B. Bowman (chairman); James A. Reuter (president and CEO)
- Products: Checking accounts; Savings accounts; Mortgage loans; Commercial loans; Insurance; Treasury management; Investments; Escrow services; Consumer finance
- Revenue: ▼US$656 million (2021)
- Operating income: ▲US$259 million (2021)
- Net income: ▲US$192 million (2021)
- Total assets: ▲US$32.06 billion (2022)
- Total equity: ▲US$1.99 billion (2021)
- Number of employees: 2,358 (2021)
- Website: firstinterstatebank.com

First Interstate BancSystem, Inc. is a financial holding company headquartered in Billings, Montana. It is the parent company of First Interstate Bank, a community bank with locations throughout 14 states within the Western and Midwestern United States. It is the largest bank based in Montana, as measured by total assets.

== History ==
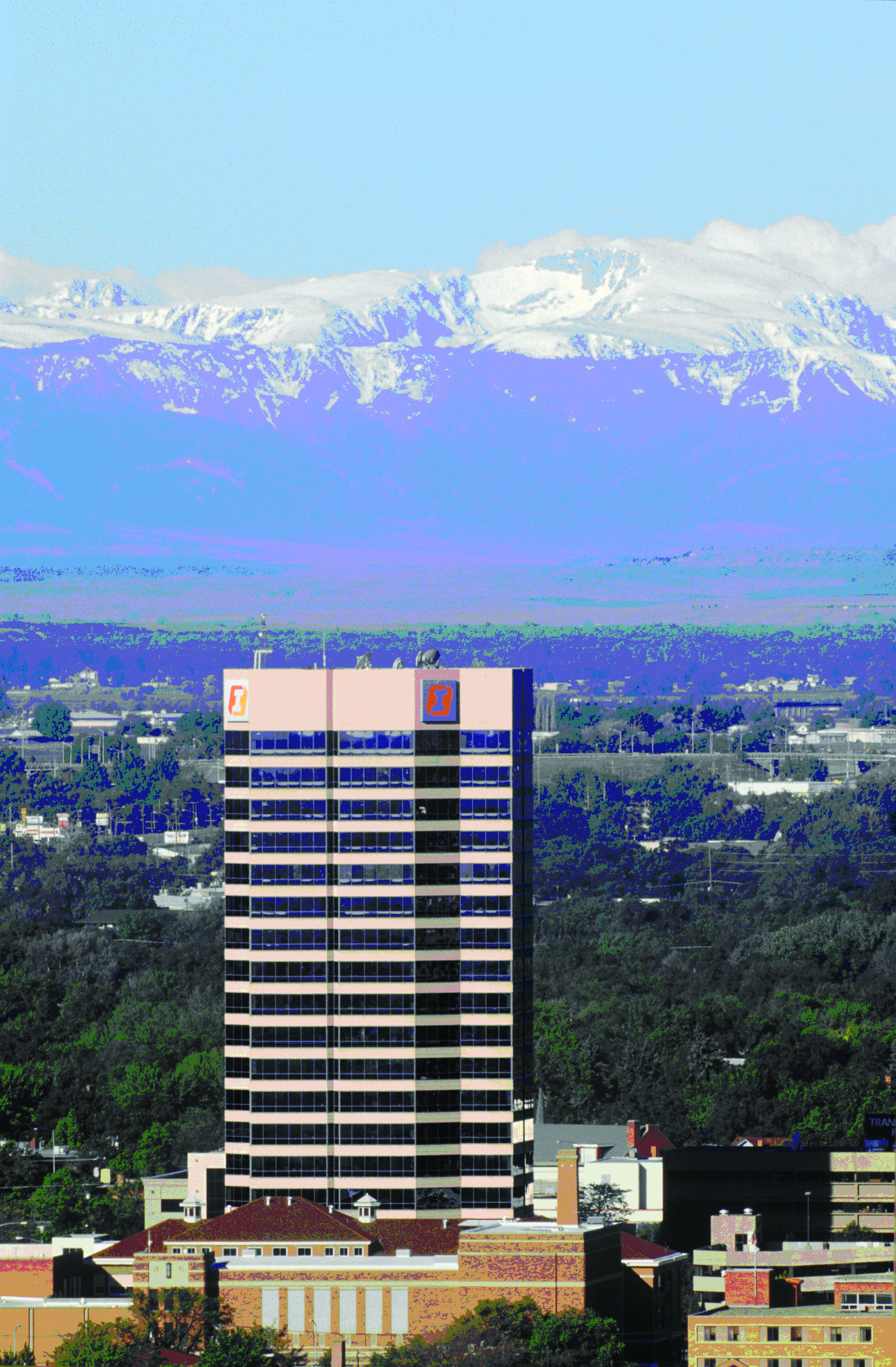
First Interstate Center in Billings, Montana

First Interstate Bank was established in 1968 when its founder, Homer Scott, Sr. purchased the Bank of Commerce in Sheridan, Wyoming. Scott incorporated the company in Montana in 1971 and over the next ten years acquired two more banks and established six de novo banks in Montana and Wyoming.

In 1984, the company entered into a franchise agreement with First Interstate Bancorp, a multistate bank holding company headquartered in Los Angeles, California, to use the First Interstate Bank name and logo.

In 1996, Wells Fargo acquired First Interstate Bancorp, but not First Interstate Bank. Instead, the Montana organization successfully negotiated to retain the well-known First Interstate name and logo. In 2017, the company retained the rights to use the First Interstate name and logo in all 50 states.

By the end of 1999, First Interstate had grown to 42 branches through a combination of de novo start-ups and acquisitions.

In 2008, the Bank expanded into South Dakota by acquiring 18 banking offices pursuant to the purchase of First Western Bank.

The Bank extended into Idaho, Oregon and Washington with the acquisitions of Cascade Bancorp in 2017 and Northwest Bancorporation, Inc., in 2018—the parent companies of Bank of the Cascades and Inland Northwest Bank, respectively. In 2019, Idaho Independent and Community 1st Banks joined the Company, officially becoming First Interstate Bank in June of that year.

In September 2021, First Interstate announced a merger with Sioux Falls, South Dakota–based Great Western Bank. The merger was completed on February 1, 2022, making Great Western an operating division of First Interstate Bank and extended the bank's presence into Arizona, Colorado and within the Midwest, with new locations in Iowa, Kansas, Minnesota, Missouri, Nebraska, North Dakota and South Dakota. Great Western locations then became First Interstate Bank branches on May 23, 2022.

== Properties ==
First Interstate Bank is a 50% owner and primary tenant of the First Interstate Center, a 20-story building in Billings, Montana. Completed in 1985, the 272-foot structure is the tallest building in the state of Montana.
