= Interstate 94 in Montana =

Section of Interstate Highway in Montana, United States

Interstate 94
- I-94 highlighted in red

Route information
- Maintained by MDT
- Length: 249.606 mi (401.702 km)
- NHS: Entire route

Major junctions
- West end: I-90 / US 87 / US 212 in Lockwood
- US 12 near Forsyth; MT 59 in Miles City; US 12 in Miles City; MT 16 in Glendive
- East end: I-94 at the North Dakota state line in Beach, ND

Location
- Country: United States
- State: Montana
- Counties: Yellowstone, Treasure, Rosebud, Custer, Prairie, Dawson, Wibaux

Highway system
- Interstate Highway System; Main; Auxiliary; Suffixed; Business; Future; Montana Highway System; Interstate; US; State; Secondary
← US 93	→ MT 117

Interstate 94 (I-94) is an east–west Interstate Highway, which links Billings, Montana, to the Canada–US border in Port Huron, Michigan. The portion in the US state of Montana is 250 miles (400 km) long, linking seven counties through the central part of the state.

The speed limit has been 80 mph (130 km/h) since January 2016, except near Billings where it is 65 mph (105 km/h).

== Route description ==
=== Yellowstone County ===
I-94 starts in Yellowstone County east of Billings, in the suburb of Lockwood at I-90 and travels northeast to the towns of Huntley, Ballantine, Pompeys Pillar, and Custer. I-94 meets MT 47 near Custer. MT 47 heads south towards I-90 and the city of Hardin. It also junctions with MT 39, which heads south towards Colstrip.

=== Treasure, Rosebud, and Custer counties ===
Entering Treasure County, I-94 passes near the small towns of Bighorn and Hysham; there is a little ranch access at milemarker 63.01. After entering Treasure County, the next county is Rosebud County, about 15 miles (24 km) east. I-94 intersects US Highway 12 before entering Forsyth, after that is Custer County which is where I-94 junctions MT 59 in Miles City, at exit 138, and the east end of US 12 at exit 141, east of Miles City.

=== Prairie, Dawson, and Wibaux counties ===
After entering Prairie County after passing the small towns of Terry and Fallon, the next county is Dawson County, entering the cities of Glendive which connects with MT 16 and entering the city of Wibaux, where it junctions with MT 7, before reaching the North Dakota state line in Beach, North Dakota. I-94 heads east towards Medora, Dickinson, and Bismarck.

== History ==
Between its western terminus in Billings and the North Dakota state line, I-94 replaced US 10.

== Exit list ==
County	Location	mi	km	Exit	Destinations	Notes
Yellowstone	Lockwood	0.000	0.000	0	I-90 / US 87 / US 212 – Billings, Sheridan	I-94 western terminus; I-90 exit 456
Yellowstone	Huntley	6.069	9.767	6	S-522 – Huntley	
Yellowstone	Ballantine	14.705	23.665	14	Ballantine, Worden	
Yellowstone	Pompeys Pillar	23.124	37.214	23	Pompeys Pillar (S-568)	Access to Pompeys Pillar National Monument
Yellowstone		35.890	57.759	36	Waco	
Yellowstone	Custer	47.068	75.749	47	Custer (S-310)	
Yellowstone		49.392	79.489	49	MT 47 south – Hardin	
Treasure		52.552	84.574	53	Bighorn	
Treasure		62.504	100.590	63	Ranch Access	
Treasure		67.379	108.436	67	Hysham (S-311)	Former I-94 Bus.
Treasure		71.468	115.017	72	S-384 (Sarpy Creek Road)	
Rosebud		81.405	131.009	82	Reservation Creek Road	
Rosebud		87.070	140.126	87	MT 39 – Colstrip	
Rosebud	Forsyth	93.038	149.730	93	US 12 west – Forsyth, Roundup	West end of US 12 concurrency, former east I-94 Bus.
Rosebud	Forsyth	94.666	152.350	95	Forsyth	Former west I-94 Bus.
Rosebud		103.447	166.482	103	S-446 (Rosebud Creek Road) / S-447 – Rosebud	
Rosebud		106.563	171.497	106	Butte Creek Road – Rosebud	
Rosebud		117.333	188.829	117	Hathaway	
Custer		125.839	202.518	126	Moon Creek Road	
Custer		128.353	206.564	128	Local Access	
Custer	Miles City	135.098	217.419	135	I-94 BL east – Jordan, Miles City	
Custer	Miles City	137.876	221.890	138	MT 59 – Miles City, Broadus	Access to State Veterans Cemetery, Miles Community College
Custer		140.743	226.504	141	I-94 BL west / US 12 east – Baker, Miles City	East end of US 12 concurrency
Custer		148.534	239.042	148	Valley Access	
Custer		158.841	255.630	159	Diamond Ring	
Prairie		168.299	270.851	169	Powder River Road	
Prairie		175.677	282.725	176	S-253 – Terry	
Prairie		184.860	297.503	185	S-340 – Fallon	
Dawson		191.788	308.653	192	Bad Route Road	
Dawson		197.852	318.412	198	Cracker Box Road	
Dawson		203.439	327.403	204	Whoopup Creek Road	
Dawson		205.693	331.031	206	Pleasant View Road	
Dawson		209.621	337.352	210	I-94 BL east / MT 200S – Glendive, Circle, West Glendive	
Dawson	West Glendive	210.790	339.234	211	MT 200S – Circle	Westbound exit and eastbound entrance
Dawson	West Glendive	212.594	342.137	213	MT 16 – Glendive, Sidney	Access to Regina, Canada via Raymond–Regway Border Crossing
Dawson	Glendive	214.672	345.481	215	I-94 BL west – Glendive City Center	Access to Dawson Community College, Makoshika State Park
Dawson		223.502	359.692	224	Frontage Road – Griffith Creek	
Dawson		230.636	371.173	231	Hodges Road	
Wibaux		235.409	378.854	236	Ranch Access	
Wibaux	Wibaux	241.079	387.979	241	MT 7 / S-261 – Baker, Wibaux	Eastbound exit and westbound entrance, former east I-94 Bus.
Wibaux	Wibaux	241.698	388.975	242	MT 7 / S-261 – Baker, Wibaux	Westbound exit and eastbound entrance, former west I-94 Bus.
Wibaux		248.073	399.235	248	Carlyle Road	
		249.377	401.333	Montana–North Dakota state line		
Golden Valley					I-94 east – Bismarck	Continuation into North Dakota
1.000 mi = 1.609 km; 1.000 km = 0.621 mi: Concurrency terminus; Incomplete access

Interstate 94
Previous state: Terminus	Montana	Next state: North Dakota
