= Nibbe, Montana =

- Census Designated Place
- Location within Montana Location within the United States
- Coordinates: 45°59′06″N 108°01′48″W
- Country: United States
- State: Montana
- County: Yellowstone

Area
  - Total: 0.23 sq mi (0.60 km^{2})
  - Land: 0.23 sq mi (0.60 km^{2})
  - Water: 0 sq mi (0.00 km^{2})
- Elevation: 2,894 ft (882 m)

Population (2020)
  - Total: 71
  - Density: 305.8/sq mi (118.07/km^{2})
- Time zone: UTC-7 (Mountain (MST))
  - Summer (DST): UTC-6 (MDT)
- ZIP code: 59088
- Area code: 406
- GNIS feature ID: 2804323

Nibbe (/ˈnɪbbi/ NIHB-bee) is a Census Designated Place located in Yellowstone County, Montana and shares a postal ZIP code with Worden (59088). As of the 2020 census, Nibbe had a population of 71.

== History ==
Once a station on the Northern Pacific Railway one mile west of the geological formation Pompeys Pillar, Nibbe was established as a town in 1920 along the Yellowstone River. Nibbe was an agricultural community in the Huntley Project area and had a grain elevator and a number of small businesses. The community gradually faded away with the decline of the agricultural industry and the concentration of activities moving to larger nearby communities.

A post office was active in Nibbe until 1954.

== Demographics ==
Historical population
Census	Pop.	Note	%±
2020	71		—
U.S. Decennial Census

== Education ==
The school district is Huntley Project K-12 Schools, a K-12 unified school district.
