= Yellowstone County News =

Montana weekly newspaper

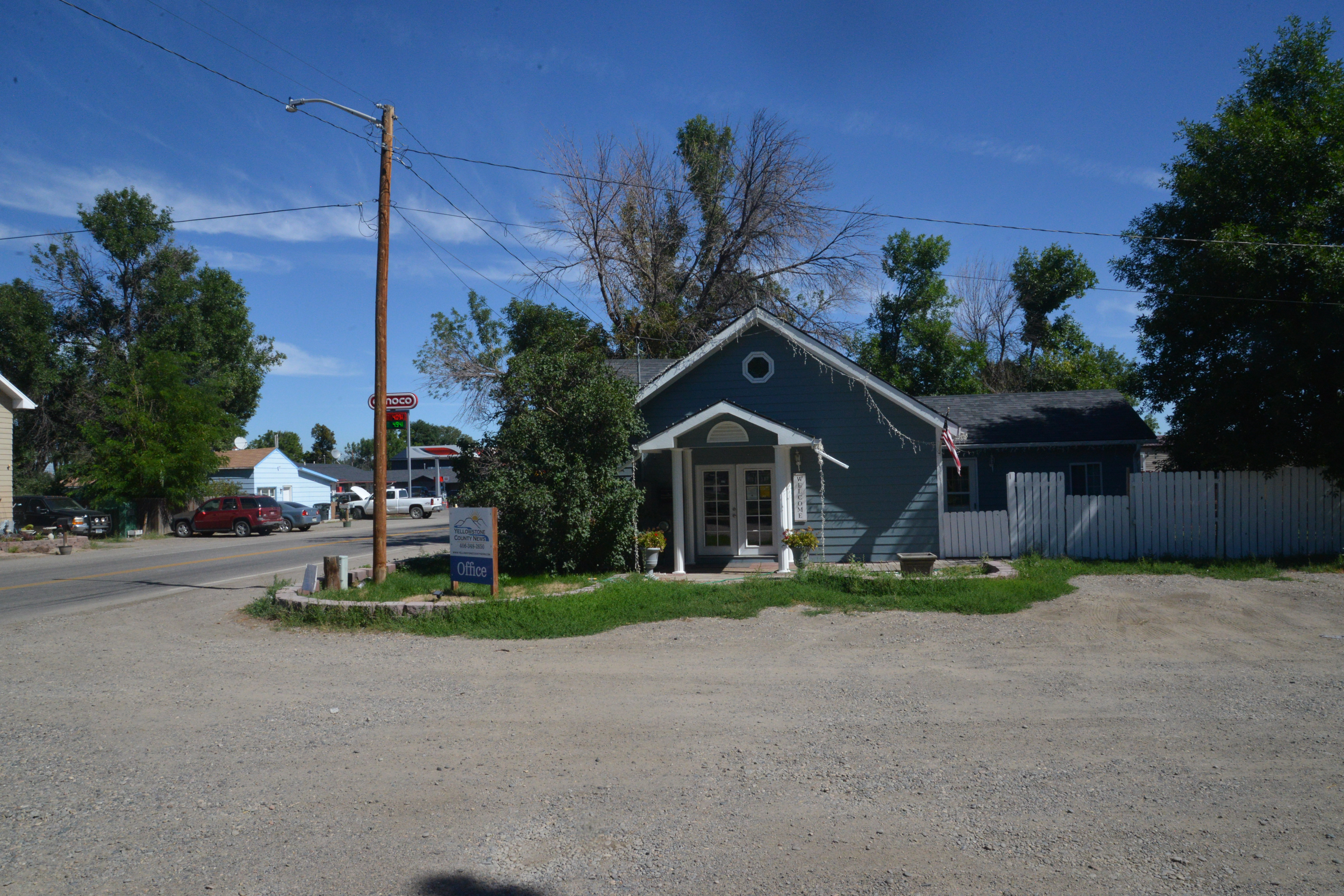
- Main office of Yellowstone County News, located at 130 Northern Avenue in Huntley, Montana. Pictured in August 2022.
- Type: Weekly newspaper
- Owner(s): Jonathan and Tana McNiven
- Founder(s): Dave and Jan Willms
- Editor: Jonathan McNiven
- Deputy editor: Norma McNiven
- Founded: October 20, 1977
- Website: yellowstonecountynews.com

Yellowstone County News (YCN) is a weekly newspaper based in Huntley, Montana which provides hyperlocal news coverage to the Yellowstone County, Montana area, which includes Billings, Laurel, Shepherd, Huntley, Worden, Ballantine, and Pompey's Pillar. It is owned and operated by Jonathan and Tana McNiven.

== History ==
On October 20, 1977, the first edition of the Yellowstone County News was published. It was founded by Dave and Jan Willms, who ran the paper out of their home in Ballantine, Montana for eleven years before selling it to Dale and Beccy Oberly. The couple owned the Big Timber Pioneer, and were looking to start a second paper when they saw the News had announced its closure and the two decided to buy and revive it.

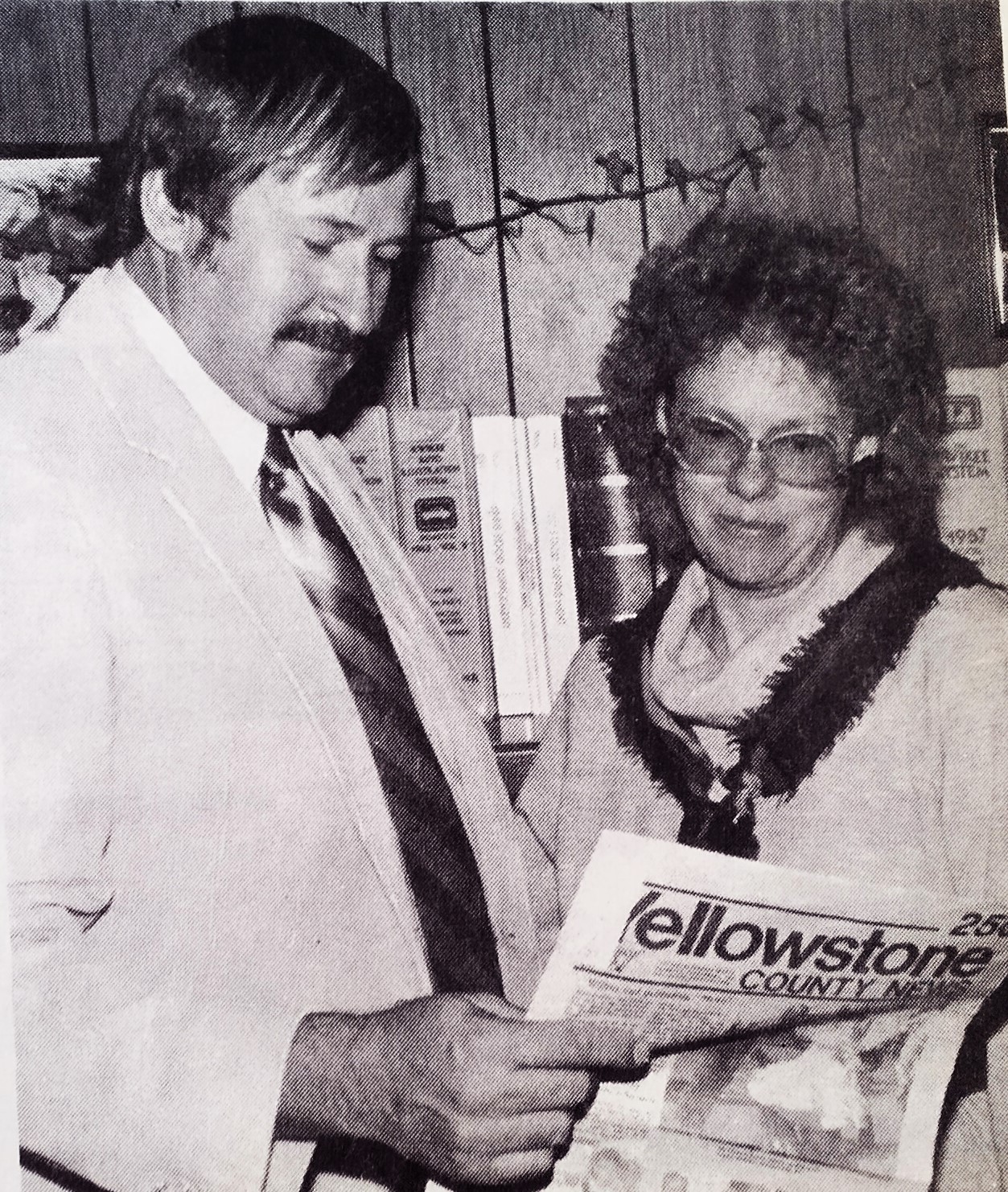
Dale and Rebecca Oberly are pictured here as they take a look at the Yellowstone County News in September 1988, shortly after finalizing their purchase of the publication from its founders.

On September 21, 1988, the sale was finalized. The Oberlies immediately hired a manager and an editor, and moved the operation into an office in the Heights section of Billings, Montana. They operated the weekly newspaper for five years. During this time, the News regularly employed up to seven correspondents who wrote news stories from their respective areas of the county. The cost of a subscription was $18 per year for customers who resided in the county, $26 from other areas of Montana, and $30 for any other part of the United States.

In June 1994, Pete and Rebecca Tescher-Robison purchased the News from the Oberlies and moved the office back to the Worden, Montana area. In October 2014, former Republican lawmaker Jonathan McNiven and his wife Tana purchased the Yellowstone County News. Jonathan announced in November 2014, after being re-elected to his third term in the Montana House of Representatives, that he would be finishing the rest of his term that year but would be stepping down from his position to take over the newspaper.

In May 2017, the News was awarded the contract for legal advertising from the City of Billings, and the publication was recognized as the Publication of Record for Yellowstone County.

== Recognition ==
Yellowstone County News has received awards from the Montana Newspaper Association's annual "Better Newspaper Contest" for both its news content and its advertising work.

== Lawsuit ==
In January 2021, Yellowstone County News filed suit against Roundup Public Schools for allegedly denying the publication access to a sporting event at Roundup High School while allowing other media outlets to attend and cover the event, which the News claimed violated their First Amendment rights. Judge Randal Spaulding ruled that same month that the school did not violate the First Amendment rights of YCN. The judge further denied the newspaper's motion for a preliminary injunction.
