= Pompey's Pillar (disambiguation) =

Pompey's Pillar is an ancient column in Alexandria, Egypt.

Pompey's Pillar may also refer to:

- Pompeys Pillar National Monument, a large rock formation in Montana named after a member of the Lewis and Clark Expedition
- Pompey's Pillar, Montana, an unincorporated community in Montana, named after the rock formation
- Pompeys Pillar (South Australia), a mountain in Wilpena Pound
- The Pillar of Pompey, an ancient altar on the European side of the Symplegades
