= Rimrock =

Sheer rock wall at the upper edge of a plateau, canyon, or geological uplift

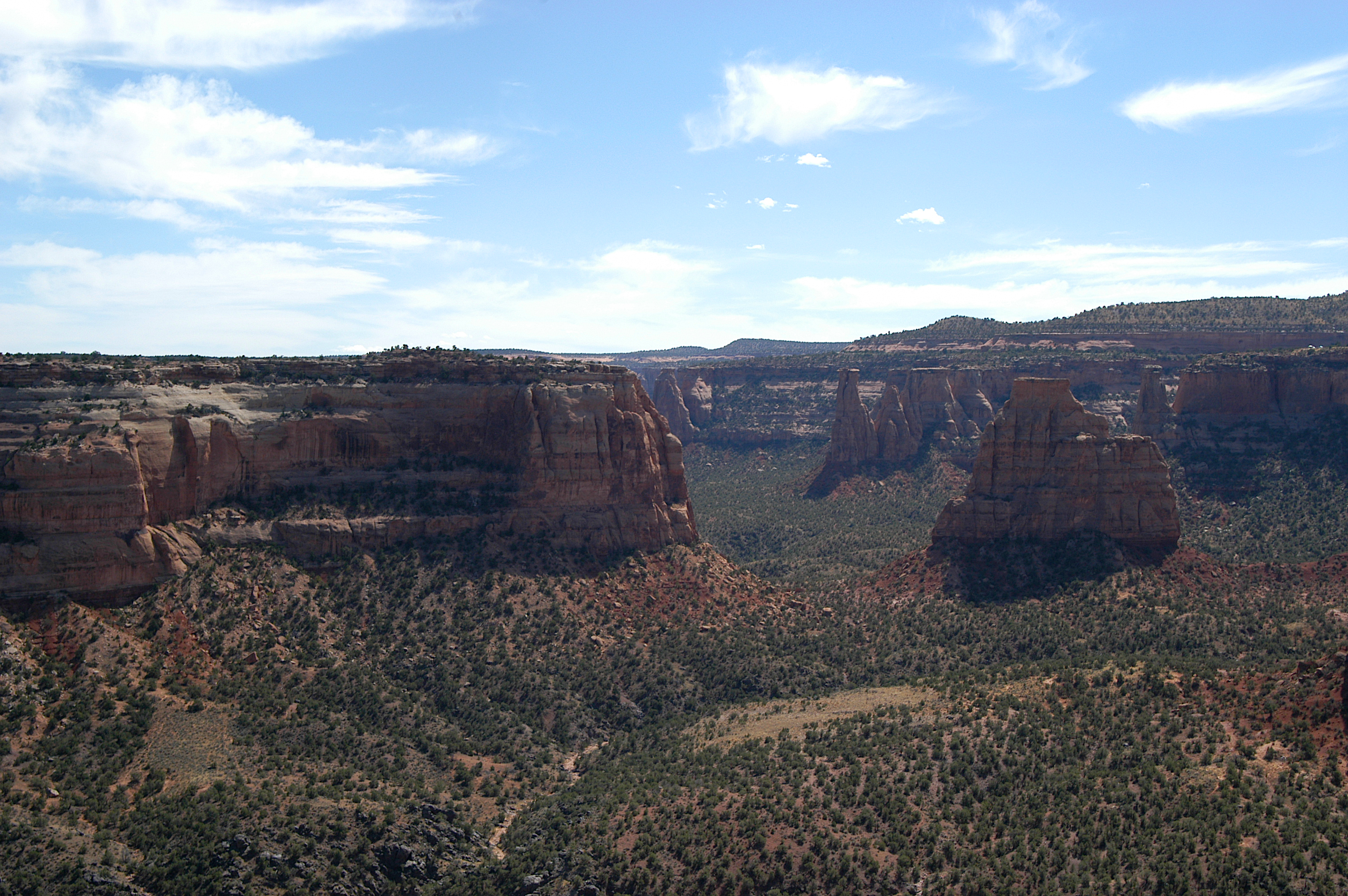
Rimrock in Colorado National Monument.

Rimrock is the sheer rock wall at the upper edge of a plateau, canyon, or top stratum of a geological uplift. It may refer to either the rock formation or to the rock itself. Rimrock may be composed of almost any stone—basalt, gneiss, granite, sandstone, etc.—and is frequently layered. Many times it overlays a softer stone which erodes away underneath. American Indians in the West often used cavities found below rimrock to construct dwellings and granaries.

== Geographic placenames ==
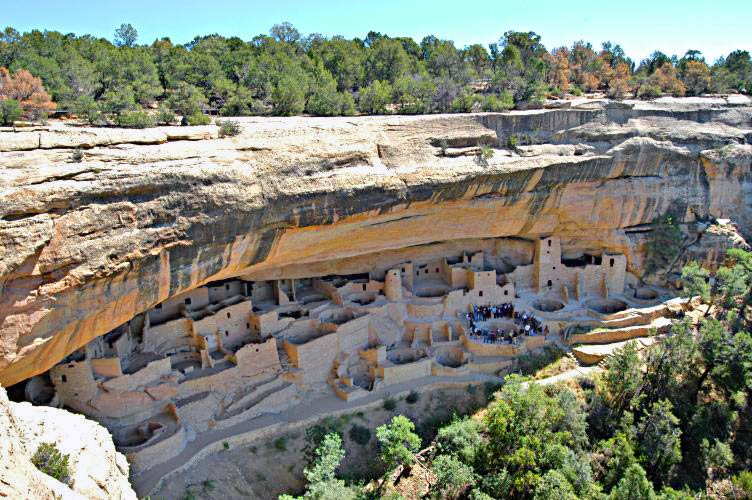
Cliff Palace in Mesa Verde National Park.

The geologic formation has lent its name to many places in the western United States.

Communities:

- Rimrock, Arizona; Yavapai County, northeast of Camp Verde.
- Rimrock, California; San Bernardino County, east of San Bernardino.
- Rimrock, Montana; Yellowstone County, west of Billings.
- Rimrock, Washington; Yakima County, near Rimrock Lake on the Tieton River west of Yakima.
- Rim Rock Colony, Montana; Toole County, north of Helena.

Canyons:

- Rim Rock Canyon, Orange County, California
- Rimrock Valley, Modoc County, California
- Rimrock Gulch, Moffat County, Colorado
- Rimrock Canyon, Nye County, Nevada
- Rim Rock Canyon, Lincoln County, New Mexico
- Rimrock Draw, Washakie County, Wyoming
- Rim Rock Draw, Johnson County, Wyoming

Cliffs:

- Rimrocks, Yellowstone County, Montana
- Rimrock, El Paso County, Texas
- The Rimrocks, Kane County, Utah

Lakes:

- Rimrock Lake, Modoc County, California
- Rimrock Lake, Carbon County, Montana
- Rimrock Lake, Colfax County, New Mexico
- Rimrock Lake, Marion County, Oregon
- Rimrock Lake, Yakima County, Washington
- Rimrock Lake, Teton County, Wyoming
- Rimrock Lake, British Columbia, Canada

Mountains:

- Rimrock, Kootenai County, Idaho
- Rimrock Butte, Glacier County, Montana
- Rimrock Mountain, Hidalgo County, New Mexico

Ridges:

- Rim Rocks, Routt County, Colorado
- Rim Rock, Grant County, New Mexico
- Rim Rock, Elko County, Nevada
- Rim Rock, Hood River County, Oregon

High Schools:

- Rimrock High School in Bruneau, Idaho

== See also ==
- Bluff
- Butte
- Cliff
- Escarpment
- Mesa
