= Comanche, Montana =

- Unincorporated community
- Location within Montana Location within the United States
- Coordinates: 45°59′51″N 108°46′24″W
- Country: United States
- State: Montana
- County: Yellowstone
- Elevation: 3,747 ft (1,142 m)

Population (2010)
  - Total: 26
- Time zone: UTC-7 (Mountain (MST))
  - Summer (DST): UTC-6 (MDT)
- ZIP code: 59002 & 59015
- Area code: 406
- GNIS feature ID: 806935

Comanche (also spelled Commanche) is an unincorporated community in Yellowstone County, Montana, United States. It lies on Montana Highway 3, 16 miles northwest of the city of Billings and shares a postal ZIP code with Acton (59002). It also shares a zip code with Broadview (59015).

== History ==
Comanche was established as a railroad station on the Great Northern Railroad northwest of Billings. It was named for both the horse that was the only living being found on the battlefield after the Battle of the Little Big Horn; as was the town's geographical region, Comanche Flat.

The village declined with the advent of changing transportation technologies and demographics. A church and parsonage once existed in Comanche before being moved to nearby Broadview.

Comanche has a newer subdivision which makes up the town of today. Of the original structures, the original grain elevator, the depot, the main street, and Comanche Cemetery west of town remain. The post office was active in Comanche from 1909 to 1942, with Lola Dell Helm as postmaster.
