= Gary Fox (American football) =

American football player (born 1950)

Profile
- Position: Quarterback

Personal information
- Born: c. 1950
- Listed height: 6 ft 0 in (1.83 m)
- Listed weight: 190 lb (86 kg)

Career information
- High school: Billings West (MT)
- College: Wyoming (1969-1971)

Gary Fox (born June 7, 1950) was an American football quarterback. He played high school football at Billings West High School in Billings, Montana, and was selected as Montana's Class AA player of the year in 1967. He played college football for Wyoming from 1969 to 1971. As a senior, he was the captain and most valuable player of the 1971 Wyoming Cowboys football team, and he ranked among the leading quarterbacks in major-college football that year with 2,336 passing yards (4th), 212.4 yards gained per game played (4th), 171 pass completions (5th), 328 pass attempts (7th), 2,175 total yards (8th), 20 passing interceptions (8th), and 14 passing touchdowns (9th).
