= Mountain View Colony, Montana =

- Census-designated place
- Location within Montana Location within the United States
- Coordinates: 46°04′05″N 108°43′17″W
- Country: United States
- State: Montana
- County: Yellowstone

Area
  - Total: 0.29 sq mi (0.74 km^{2})
  - Land: 0.29 sq mi (0.74 km^{2})
  - Water: 0 sq mi (0.00 km^{2})
- Elevation: 3,875 ft (1,181 m)

Population (2020)
  - Total: 125
  - Density: 439.4/sq mi (169.65/km^{2})
- Time zone: UTC-7 (Mountain (MST))
  - Summer (DST): UTC-6 (MDT)
- ZIP Code: 59015 (Broadview)
- Area code: 406
- FIPS code: 30-52185
- GNIS feature ID: 2804321

Mountain View Colony is a Hutterite community and census-designated place (CDP) in Yellowstone County, Montana, United States. As of the 2020 census, Mountain View Colony had a population of 125. It is in the western part of the county, 10 miles (16 km) to the southeast of Broadview and 26 miles (42 km) northwest of Billings.

The community was first listed as a CDP prior to the 2020 census.

== Demographics ==
Historical population
Census	Pop.	Note	%±
2020	125		—
U.S. Decennial Census

== Education ==
The school districts are Broadview Elementary School District and Broadview High School District.
