= Osborn, Montana =

- Populated place
- Location within Montana Location within the United States
- Coordinates: 45°55′28″N 108°14′39″W
- Country: United States
- State: Montana
- County: Yellowstone
- Elevation: 3,014 ft (919 m)

Population (2010)
  - Total: N/A
- Time zone: UTC-7 (Mountain (MST))
  - Summer (DST): UTC-6 (MDT)
- ZIP code: 59037
- Area code: 406

Osborn (also Osborn Townsite) is a populated place and ghost town located in Yellowstone County, Montana, United States.

== History ==
Osborn was established as a town with a train station in 1907 along the Huntley Project irrigation system and retained a post office for only six years, until its closure in 1914.

In 1928, several blocks of land within the "Osborn Townsite" were withdrawn by the federal government and set aside for use by the Department of Agriculture as an agricultural field station.

== Today ==
The Huntley Project Museum of Irrigated Agriculture is located on 10.4 acres (4.2 ha) of the townsite, where 18 homestead buildings from the early 1900s have been preserved.

The Southern Agricultural Research Center is also located here, as well as a small fairground where occasional gatherings can be set up.

The community has been well preserved as a museum showpiece. While none of the original businesses remain, many of the original residences are still standing and occupied.

== Location ==
The U.S. Geographic Names Information System does not list Osborn, Montana.

The "Huntley Project Division (Huntley)" is located at Coord|45.9137666|-108.2773054|.

The Huntley Project Museum, as well as the Southern Agricultural Research Center, are located at Coord|45.924397|-108.244574|.
