= Huntley, Montana =

- CDP
- Location of Huntley, Montana
- Coordinates: 45°53′58″N 108°18′20″W
- Country: United States
- State: Montana
- County: Yellowstone

Area
  - Total: 1.60 sq mi (4.15 km^{2})
  - Land: 1.52 sq mi (3.94 km^{2})
  - Water: 0.081 sq mi (0.21 km^{2})
- Elevation: 3,019 ft (920 m)

Population (2020)
  - Total: 442
  - Density: 291/sq mi (112.3/km^{2})
- Time zone: UTC-7 (Mountain (MST))
  - Summer (DST): UTC-6 (MDT)
- ZIP code: 59037
- Area code: 406
- FIPS code: 30-38200
- GNIS feature ID: 2408411

Huntley is a census-designated place (CDP) in Yellowstone County, Montana, United States. As of the 2020 census, Huntley had a population of 442. Huntley lent its name to the Huntley Project, a federal irrigation project that began delivering water to the arid district in 1907. Today, Huntley is an eastern suburb of Billings and is located east of Shepherd and west of Worden.

== History ==
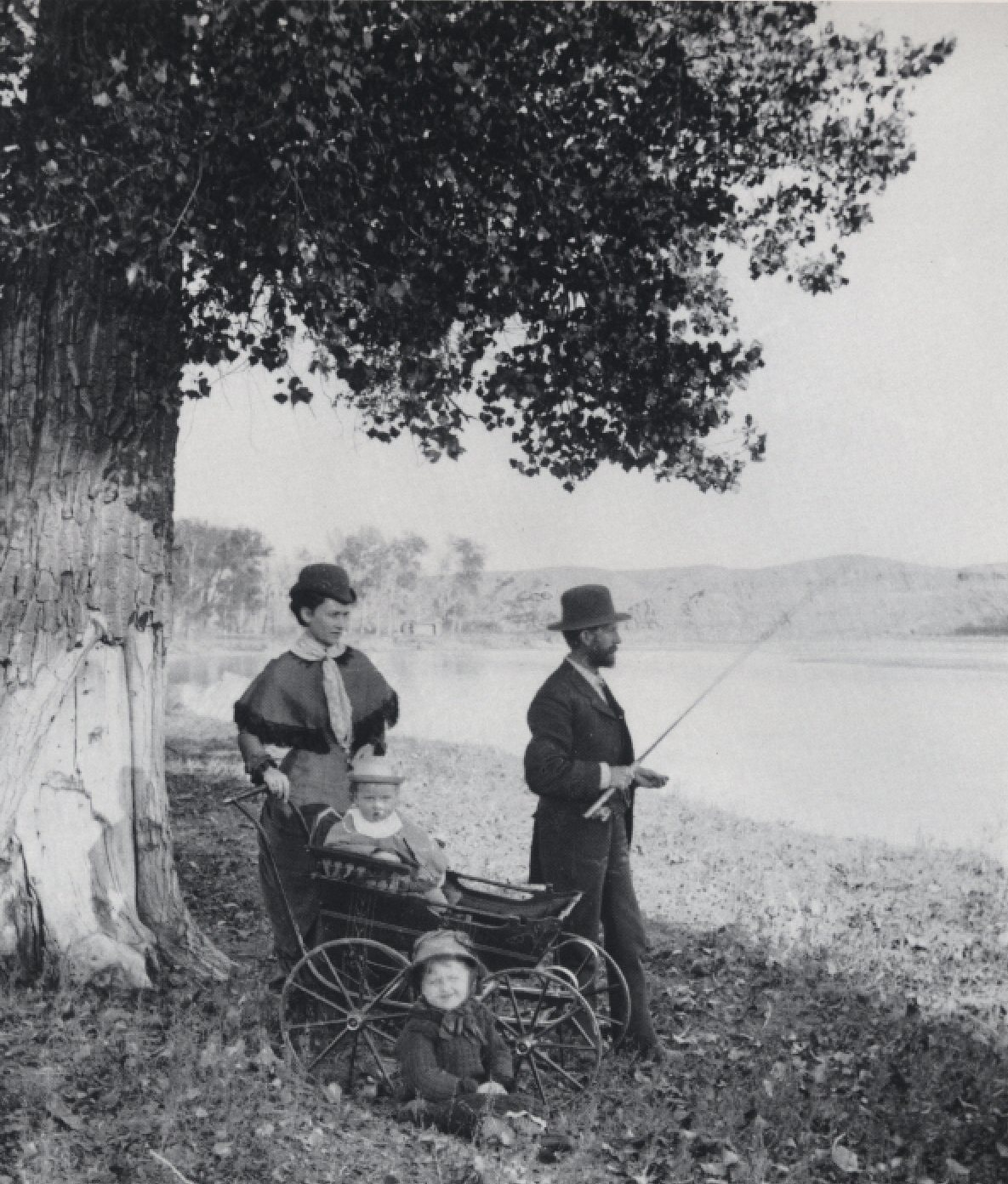
George N. Smith and family at the Yellowstone River, Huntley, Montana, 1881

This settlement in arid Crow Indian country was named for S.O. Huntley, a partner in the stagecoach firm of Clark & Huntley. It was located at the head of navigation on the Yellowstone River. The first steamboat, the packet Josephine, arrived June 6, 1875, but river trade was infrequent. A U.S. post office was established in March 1878. The 1880 Census found only 37 people living in Huntley.

Surveying for a railroad led to the so-called "Baker Battle" between Sioux Indians and Army engineers in 1872. The Northern Pacific Railroad arrived in 1882, connecting the town to the new city of Billings. Three years later the town called "Huntley Station" had two stores, a hotel, and a blacksmith. German immigrants were prominent among the new settlers, who established Lutheran and German Methodist churches.

In 1905 the United States Bureau of Reclamation began an irrigation project, called the Huntley Project, on lands that had been part of the Crow Indian Reservation until 1904. The town of Huntley was incorporated into the project along with the new railroad towns of Ballantine, Worden, and Pompey's Pillar, all founded in 1907.

During the Yellowstone Flood of 1937, the damage to Huntley was more extensive, percentage-wise, than in any other community in the region. Much of the original town of Huntley was destroyed and significant portions of the land it occupied was claimed or compromised by the Yellowstone River. The flood damage included washing away the suspension bridge that allowed adjacent Highway 312 to cross the river. After the flood, the site of the town was relocated from the north side of the river to the higher elevation on the south bank.

== Geography ==
According to the United States Census Bureau, the CDP has a total area of 1.3 square miles (3.4 km^{2}), all land.

=== Climate ===
According to the Köppen Climate Classification system, Huntley has a cold semi-arid climate, abbreviated "BSk" on climate maps.

Climate data for Huntley Experimental Station, Montana, 1991–2020 normals, extremes 1911–present
Month	Jan	Feb	Mar	Apr	May	Jun	Jul	Aug	Sep	Oct	Nov	Dec	Year
Record high °F (°C)	69 (21)	74 (23)	84 (29)	92 (33)	99 (37)	107 (42)	110 (43)	106 (41)	105 (41)	94 (34)	81 (27)	76 (24)	110 (43)
Mean maximum °F (°C)	56.7 (13.7)	61.9 (16.6)	72.1 (22.3)	81.8 (27.7)	87.3 (30.7)	94.6 (34.8)	100.1 (37.8)	99.2 (37.3)	95.2 (35.1)	84.1 (28.9)	70.2 (21.2)	58.1 (14.5)	100.8 (38.2)
Mean daily maximum °F (°C)	34.9 (1.6)	39.2 (4.0)	49.8 (9.9)	58.5 (14.7)	67.5 (19.7)	77.1 (25.1)	87.1 (30.6)	86.1 (30.1)	75.3 (24.1)	60.3 (15.7)	46.7 (8.2)	36.4 (2.4)	59.9 (15.5)
Daily mean °F (°C)	23.4 (−4.8)	26.7 (−2.9)	35.9 (2.2)	45.2 (7.3)	54.5 (12.5)	63.3 (17.4)	71.0 (21.7)	69.3 (20.7)	59.2 (15.1)	45.7 (7.6)	33.9 (1.1)	24.6 (−4.1)	46.1 (7.8)
Mean daily minimum °F (°C)	11.8 (−11.2)	14.3 (−9.8)	22.1 (−5.5)	31.9 (−0.1)	41.1 (5.1)	49.5 (9.7)	54.9 (12.7)	52.5 (11.4)	43.2 (6.2)	31.1 (−0.5)	21.0 (−6.1)	12.9 (−10.6)	32.2 (0.1)
Mean minimum °F (°C)	−15.7 (−26.5)	−9.6 (−23.1)	−0.8 (−18.2)	17.8 (−7.9)	26.7 (−2.9)	36.5 (2.5)	44.7 (7.1)	41.5 (5.3)	29.6 (−1.3)	14.0 (−10.0)	−2.2 (−19.0)	−10.9 (−23.8)	−24.1 (−31.2)
Record low °F (°C)	−52 (−47)	−53 (−47)	−37 (−38)	−7 (−22)	9 (−13)	27 (−3)	36 (2)	29 (−2)	16 (−9)	−15 (−26)	−33 (−36)	−47 (−44)	−53 (−47)
Average precipitation inches (mm)	0.45 (11)	0.50 (13)	0.80 (20)	1.70 (43)	2.61 (66)	2.26 (57)	1.53 (39)	0.85 (22)	1.35 (34)	1.35 (34)	0.58 (15)	0.46 (12)	14.44 (366)
Average snowfall inches (cm)	6.7 (17)	7.1 (18)	4.7 (12)	1.8 (4.6)	0.2 (0.51)	0.0 (0.0)	0.0 (0.0)	0.0 (0.0)	0.2 (0.51)	2.7 (6.9)	4.4 (11)	6.6 (17)	34.4 (87.52)
Average precipitation days (≥ 0.01 in)	5.0	5.3	6.0	9.0	11.7	11.2	7.4	5.9	6.7	7.0	5.1	5.1	85.4
Average snowy days (≥ 0.1 in)	4.5	5.0	3.4	1.3	0.2	0.0	0.0	0.0	0.1	1.2	2.8	4.4	22.9
Source 1: NOAA
Source 2: National Weather Service

== Demographics ==
Historical population
Census	Pop.	Note	%±
2020	442		—
U.S. Decennial Census

As of the census of 2000, there were 411 people, 160 households, and 108 families residing in the CDP. The population density was 319.2 inhabitants per square mile (123.2/km^{2}). There were 164 housing units at an average density of 127.4 per square mile (49.2/km^{2}). The racial makeup of the CDP was 97.32% White, 0.24% Native American, 0.24% Asian, 2.19% from other races. Hispanic or Latino of any race were 3.16% of the population.

There were 160 households, out of which 39.4% had children under the age of 18 living with them, 53.8% were married couples living together, 9.4% had a female householder with no husband present, and 31.9% were non-families. 26.9% of all households were made up of individuals, and 11.3% had someone living alone who was 65 years of age or older. The average household size was 2.57 and the average family size was 3.13.

In the CDP, the population was spread out, with 32.1% under the age of 18, 3.4% from 18 to 24, 29.4% from 25 to 44, 22.4% from 45 to 64, and 12.7% who were 65 years of age or older. The median age was 38 years. For every 100 females, there were 99.5 males. For every 100 females age 18 and over, there were 97.9 males.

The median income for a household in the CDP was $36,125, and the median income for a family was $36,750. Males had a median income of $31,250 versus $21,875 for females. The per capita income for the CDP was $13,913. About 12.9% of families and 11.5% of the population were below the poverty line, including 15.4% of those under age 18 and none of those age 65 or over.

== Economy ==
Huntley's economy is based primarily on agriculture, including yam farming, sugar beets, corn, wheat, and barley.

== Media ==
Huntley is part of the Billings media area.

The Yellowstone County News is a weekly newspaper based in Huntley. It covers news for the wider Billings area.

== Education ==
The school district is Huntley Project K-12 Schools, a K-12 unified school district.

== Notable people ==
- Richard R. "Dick" Jones (1910–2008), a trucking executive and Wyoming Republican politician
- Monica Lindeen, former member of the Montana House of Representatives
