= Nich Pertuit =

American football player (born 1983)

No. 18
- Position: Placekicker

Personal information
- Born: April 7, 1983 (age 43)
- Listed height: 6 ft 0 in (1.83 m)
- Listed weight: 195 lb (88 kg)

Career information
- High school: Senior (Billings, Montana)
- College: Incarnate Word (soccer)

Career history
- Abilene Ruff Riders (2009–2010); Iowa Barnstormers (2011); San Jose SaberCats (2012–2015); Arizona Rattlers (2016)

Awards and highlights
- ArenaBowl champion (2015); First-team All-Arena (2014); Second-team All-Arena (2012); AFL Kicker of the Year (2014)

Career AFL statistics
- FG made: 22
- FG att: 32
- PAT made: 540
- PAT att: 603
- Tackles: 17.5
- Stats at ArenaFan.com

Nicholas Pertuit (born April 7, 1983) is an American former professional football placekicker who played in the Arena Football League (AFL). He played college soccer at the University of the Incarnate Word. He was a member of the Abilene Ruff Riders, Iowa Barnstormers, San Jose SaberCats, and Arizona Rattlers.

== Early life and college ==
Nicholas Pertuit was born on April 7, 1983. He attended Billings Senior High School in Billings, Montana.

Pertuit played college soccer at the University of the Incarnate Word.

== Professional career ==
Pertuit played two seasons with the Abilene Ruff Riders from 2009 to 2010. He converted 60 of 71 field goal attempts.

Pertuit signed with the Iowa Barnstormers on May 11, 2011.

Pertuit was signed by the San Jose SaberCats on April 4, 2012. He was named second-team All-Arena in 2012 and first-team All-Arena in 2014. The Sabercats won ArenaBowl XXVIII against the Jacksonville Sharks on August 29, 2015. He became a free agent after the 2015 season.

On August 4, 2016, Pertuit was assigned to the Arizona Rattlers.
