= Billings Public Schools =

American school district

Coordinates: 45.7842°N 108.5106°W

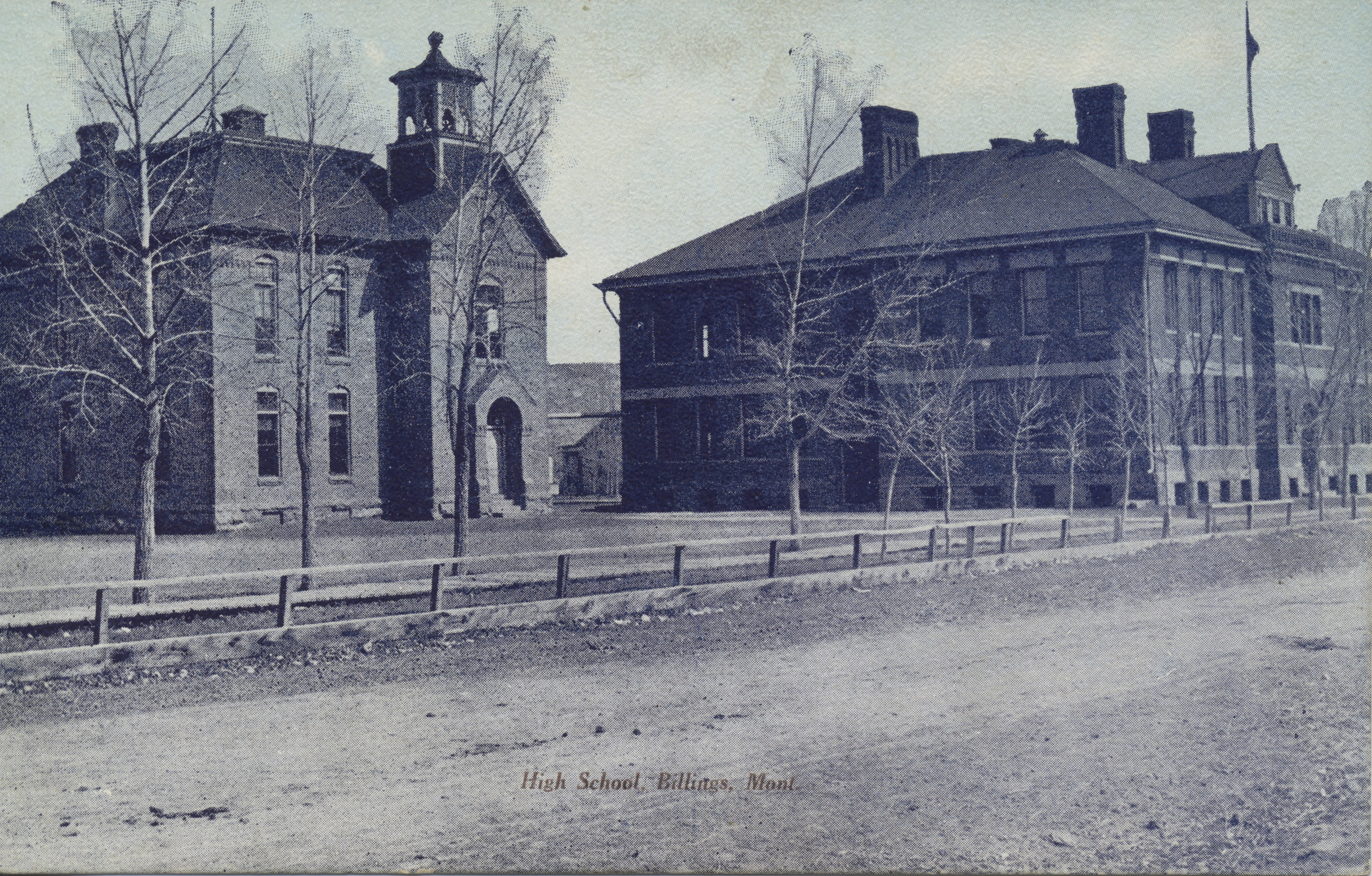
The former Old North School (left) and Billings High School (right) on the current site of SD2's administrative complex.

Billings School District 2 (SD2), or Billings Public Schools, is a school district headquartered in Billings, Montana.

Billings Public Schools has two components: Billings Elementary School District and Billings High School District. A common board of education governs both school districts. The National Center for Education Statistics (NCES) code for the elementary district, which covers grades Pre-Kindergarten to 8, is 3003870. The NCES code for the high school district is 3003900.

The elementary school district includes the majority of Billings. The high school district includes that, the remainder of Billings, and sections of the Crow Indian Reservation.

== History ==
In 1895, the first classes at Billings first high school were held. The school, named Lincoln School (commonly known as the Old North School), was a 12-room building opened in 1884. The Lincoln School building was built with an $4,000 donation from Fredrick Billings, a $8,000 bond issue and 29 lots of land contributed by the firm of Kurtz and Foster.

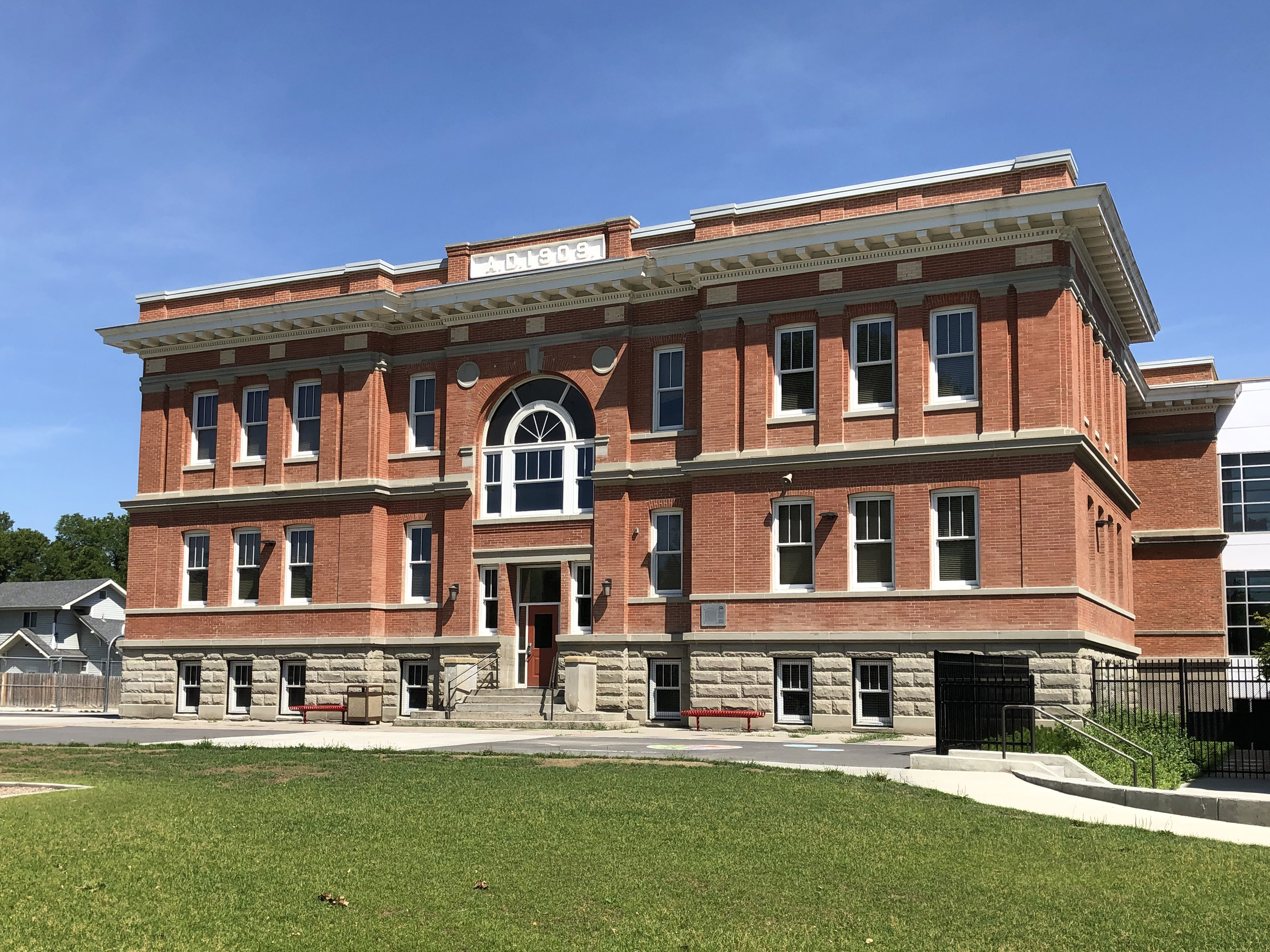
Broadwater Elementary School

In 1900, Lincoln School was considered outgrown, and the Jefferson School was opened, which would situate the upper grades and high school. A year later, in February 1901, Jefferson School received its four-year accreditation. Garfield School was built the same year, with Broadwater Elementary following in 1909. After the Jefferson School was opened, part of Lincoln School would be used for administrative purposes. A small building behind Jefferson was built in 1906 and used for industrial arts and manual training.

From 1911 to 1912, the number of graduates rose from 16 to 24, leading to the school board to vote to build a new high school. The school, Billings High School, was opened in 1914 on the same piece of land as the Jefferson and Lincoln schools. After the new school was opened, Jefferson became a junior high, and Lincoln was used entirely for administration. Later on, in 1935, Lincoln and the building behind Jefferson would be torn down to make space for an auditorium connecting the junior high and high school.

M. C. Gallagher assumed the position of superintendent in 1937, and held it until 1965. Gallagher was tasked with organizing a drive for a new high school, which he reportedly said was "long overdue"; later, in the spring of 1939, an election would be held, and on the basis of success, the school board would apply for supplemental funding. The Public Works Administration provided the required funds for the school. Billings Senior High School was completed the following year, costing around $1 million. After Senior was established, Billings High School was transformed into Lincoln Junior High School.

Billings West High School started being built in 1958 and was finished in August of 1959. During construction, students enrolled at Billings West took classes at Billing Senior High School alongside the students at Senior. In March of 1960, West High students moved to their then-new school building. Around this time, 3 junior high schools were opened, including Lewis and Clark Junior High in 1956, Riverside Junior High in 1962, and Will James Junior High in 1967.

Construction on Skyview High School began in July of 1986 and was completed in 1987.

Greg Upham was the superintendent from 2018 until he retired in 2023. Erwin Garcia replaced him as superintendent. The Board of Trustees set his contract to June 30, 2026.

In 2023, enrollment exceeded 16,000.

== Schools ==
High schools

- Billings Senior High School
- Billings West High School
- Skyview High School

Middle schools

- Castle Rock Middle School
- Will James Middle School
- Lewis and Clark Middle School
- Medicine Crow Middle School
- Riverside Middle School
- Ben Steele Middle School

Elementary schools

- Alkali Creek Elementary School
- Arrowhead Elementary School
- Beartooth Elementary School
- Bench Elementary School
- Big Sky Elementary School
- Bitterroot Elementary School
- Boulder Elementary School
- Broadwater Elementary School
- Burlington Elementary School
- Central Heights Elementary School
- Eagle Cliffs Elementary School
- Highland Elementary School
- McKinley Elementary School
- Meadowlark Elementary School
- Miles Avenue Elementary School
- Newman Elementary School
- Orchard Elementary School
- Poly Drive Elementary School
- Ponderosa Elementary School
- Rose Park Elementary School
- Sandstone Elementary School
