= Mossmain, Montana =

Town in Montana, United States of America

Coordinates: 45°41′05″N 108°42′40″W

Mossmain is a ghost town in Yellowstone County, Montana, United States in the Billings metro area.

Mossmain is in the Mountain Standard time zone at an elevation of 3,274 feet.

== History ==
The original town site of Mossmain was situated just off East Laurel Main Street and S. 72nd Street West. The community was founded and named after Preston Boyd Moss, who played a significant role in the infrastructure development and economic establishments in the Yellowstone County area, and specifically Billings.

=== The City of the Future ===
The town was originally intended to become a futuristic, showpiece city with fine architecture as well as a huge regional hub that would link many surrounding major cities together. As ambitious as it was, one of the hopes was that Mossmain would eventually juxtapose Billings, the motivation of this project being in part to create a "fresh start" to do what wasn't done in Billings.

The town was specifically planned out to accommodate for a massive rail junction and a showcase of architecture and modern culture. The design layout was intended to be concentric, with all parts of town interconnecting to a well-organized town center. The town was built approximately 10 miles west of Billings and several miles east of Laurel. The plans for Mossmain were drawn up by one of the most brilliant architects and city planners in the world, Walter Burley Griffin, who also designed the city plan and some of the architecture for Canberra, the capital of Australia.

=== Decline ===
The onset of the Great Depression followed by World War II left Moss' dream for a planned city hobbled by lack of funds and material resources. Along with this, the nature of the town's planning was highly experimental and many aspects had already become technologically outdated. The rail link intended for Mossmain was built running through Laurel and bypassing Mossmain. The end results of these events led to the town's inevitable demise. Far from becoming "America's First Garden City," it was never more than a few dirt roads and some scattered dwellings. The Mossmain post office was operational from 1916 until its closure in 1935.

There is almost no visual evidence of Mossmain today, only the town's old main street, Mossmain Lane, and some scattered tree lining remains. Many of the surrounding roads and landscape were destroyed with the construction of the Interstate Highway System and an adjacent overpass connecting I90 with the old Frontage Road and E. Main Street, rendering much of the area unrecognizable. There are a few more recent industrial sites that have been built on and around the old road. However, all of the original town structures have been removed. The site can be easily accessed from the East Laurel interchange on I-90.
