= Homewood Park, Montana =

- Populated place
- Location within Montana
- Coordinates: 45°47′03″N 108°42′16″W
- Country: United States
- State: Montana
- County: Yellowstone
- Elevation: 3,407 ft (1,038 m)

Population (2010)
  - Total: N/A
- Time zone: UTC-7 (Mountain (MST))
  - Summer (DST): UTC-6 (MDT)
- ZIP code: 59106
- Area code: 406
- GNIS feature ID: 777090

Homewood Park is a populated place in Yellowstone County, Montana situated near the old Baseline train stop on Grand Avenue. The community is a "West End" subdivision within the greater Billings Metro Area and uses a Billings postal ZIP code (59106).
