= Ballantine, Montana =

- CDP
- Location of Ballantine, Montana
- Coordinates: 45°57′04″N 108°08′34″W
- Country: United States
- State: Montana
- County: Yellowstone

Area
  - Total: 0.91 sq mi (2.36 km^{2})
  - Land: 0.91 sq mi (2.36 km^{2})
  - Water: 0 sq mi (0.00 km^{2})
- Elevation: 2,996 ft (913 m)

Population (2020)
  - Total: 293
  - Density: 322.0/sq mi (124.32/km^{2})
- Time zone: UTC-7 (Mountain (MST))
  - Summer (DST): UTC-6 (MDT)
- ZIP code: 59006
- Area code: 406
- FIPS code: 30-03625
- GNIS feature ID: 2407793

Ballantine is a census-designated place (CDP) in Yellowstone County, Montana, United States. It lies approximately 23 miles northeast of Billings on Interstate 94. As of the 2020 census, Ballantine had a population of 293. Ballantine, along with the communities of Pompey's Pillar, Worden, and Huntley, is part of the Huntley Project, an irrigation district created by the United States Bureau of Reclamation. The majority of Ballantine's population lives on scattered farms and ranches surrounding the actual townsite.

== History ==
Ballantine was founded on land that had been part of the Crow Indian Reservation. In 1896, the Burlington & Missouri River Railroad established Ballantine as a station, named for homesteader E. P. Ballantine. By 1907 the town had a post office and the Chicago, Burlington & Quincy Railroad had taken over rail operations.

It was in 1907 that Ballantine became part of a federally funded irrigation district, the Huntley Project. Irrigation slowly changed the sagebrush landscape into farms growing sugar beets, alfalfa, and other crops. The population grew slowly and included many European immigrants. Both Catholic and Lutheran religious services were held here, and a Congregational Church was built. The Anita Dam and Reservoir project, about six miles southeast of Ballantine, was completed in 1937 by Civilian Conservation Corps workers.

== Geography ==
According to the United States Census Bureau, the CDP has a total area of 0.9 square miles (2.3 km^{2}), all land.

Ballantine is located near Interstate 94, approximately thirty miles east of Billings.

=== Climate ===
According to the Köppen Climate Classification system, Ballantine has a semi-arid climate, abbreviated "BSk" on climate maps. The hottest temperature recorded in Ballantine was 110 °F (43 °C) on July 5, 1936, while the coldest temperature recorded was −50 °F (−46 °C) on February 15, 1936.

Climate data for Ballantine, Montana, 1981–2010 normals, extremes 1919–2011
Month	Jan	Feb	Mar	Apr	May	Jun	Jul	Aug	Sep	Oct	Nov	Dec	Year
Record high °F (°C)	69 (21)	77 (25)	86 (30)	94 (34)	104 (40)	107 (42)	110 (43)	108 (42)	104 (40)	93 (34)	77 (25)	70 (21)	110 (43)
Mean maximum °F (°C)	54.4 (12.4)	59.9 (15.5)	70.6 (21.4)	81.6 (27.6)	89.8 (32.1)	96.5 (35.8)	101.8 (38.8)	100.0 (37.8)	93.8 (34.3)	83.8 (28.8)	68.0 (20.0)	57.1 (13.9)	102.8 (39.3)
Mean daily maximum °F (°C)	33.6 (0.9)	40.0 (4.4)	49.5 (9.7)	59.5 (15.3)	68.9 (20.5)	78.2 (25.7)	87.2 (30.7)	86.8 (30.4)	74.0 (23.3)	60.8 (16.0)	45.6 (7.6)	34.1 (1.2)	59.9 (15.5)
Daily mean °F (°C)	21.8 (−5.7)	27.5 (−2.5)	36.4 (2.4)	46.0 (7.8)	55.7 (13.2)	64.7 (18.2)	71.8 (22.1)	70.5 (21.4)	58.7 (14.8)	46.3 (7.9)	33.1 (0.6)	22.2 (−5.4)	46.2 (7.9)
Mean daily minimum °F (°C)	10.0 (−12.2)	15.1 (−9.4)	23.2 (−4.9)	32.5 (0.3)	42.5 (5.8)	51.2 (10.7)	56.4 (13.6)	54.2 (12.3)	43.4 (6.3)	31.8 (−0.1)	20.6 (−6.3)	10.4 (−12.0)	32.6 (0.3)
Mean minimum °F (°C)	−18.8 (−28.2)	−12.9 (−24.9)	−1.8 (−18.8)	16.0 (−8.9)	28.1 (−2.2)	38.1 (3.4)	45.3 (7.4)	42.1 (5.6)	29.3 (−1.5)	17.7 (−7.9)	−1.2 (−18.4)	−15.6 (−26.4)	−28.6 (−33.7)
Record low °F (°C)	−41 (−41)	−50 (−46)	−35 (−37)	−10 (−23)	12 (−11)	30 (−1)	37 (3)	35 (2)	19 (−7)	−13 (−25)	−31 (−35)	−44 (−42)	−50 (−46)
Average precipitation inches (mm)	0.45 (11)	0.44 (11)	0.95 (24)	1.51 (38)	2.29 (58)	2.48 (63)	1.21 (31)	0.89 (23)	1.36 (35)	1.11 (28)	0.86 (22)	0.45 (11)	14.00 (356)
Average snowfall inches (cm)	7.2 (18)	6.6 (17)	6.8 (17)	2.5 (6.4)	0.2 (0.51)	0.1 (0.25)	0.0 (0.0)	0.0 (0.0)	0.2 (0.51)	1.2 (3.0)	3.8 (9.7)	6.9 (18)	35.5 (90.37)
Average precipitation days (≥ 0.01 in)	4.4	5.0	6.5	7.1	10.1	9.3	6.3	6.0	6.8	6.2	4.8	4.5	77.0
Average snowy days (≥ 0.1 in)	4.0	3.3	3.0	0.3	0.1	0.0	0.0	0.0	0.0	0.5	1.1	3.0	15.3
Source 1: WRCC
Source 2: National Weather Service

== Demographics ==
Historical population
Census	Pop.	Note	%±
2020	293		—
U.S. Decennial Census

As of the census of 2000, there were 346 people, 130 households, and 95 families residing in the CDP. The population density was 379.3 inhabitants per square mile (146.4/km^{2}). There were 139 housing units at an average density of 152.4 per square mile (58.8/km^{2}). The racial makeup of the CDP was 89.31% White, 0.87% African American, 1.45% Native American, 0.29% Asian, 3.47% from other races, and 4.62% from two or more races. Hispanic or Latino of any race were 11.56% of the population.

There were 130 households, out of which 30.0% had children under the age of 18 living with them, 61.5% were married couples living together, 6.2% had a female householder with no husband present, and 26.2% were non-families. 20.8% of all households were made up of individuals, and 8.5% had someone living alone who was 65 years of age or older. The average household size was 2.66 and the average family size was 3.08.

In the CDP, the population was spread out, with 25.1% under the age of 18, 9.8% from 18 to 24, 23.7% from 25 to 44, 27.5% from 45 to 64, and 13.9% who were 65 years of age or older. The median age was 40 years. For every 100 females, there were 104.7 males. For every 100 females age 18 and over, there were 110.6 males.

The median income for a household in the CDP was $30,417, and the median income for a family was $51,875. Males had a median income of $35,938 versus $18,125 for females. The per capita income for the CDP was $16,707. About 7.8% of families and 7.4% of the population were below the poverty line, including none of those under age 18 and 23.6% of those age 65 or over.

== Education ==
The school district is Huntley Project K-12 Schools, a K-12 unified school district.
