= Hathaway, Montana =

- Unincorporated community
- Location within Montana Location within the United States
- Coordinates: 46°16′34″N 106°11′48″W
- Country: United States
- State: Montana
- County: Rosebud
- Elevation: 2,441 ft (744 m)
- Time zone: UTC-7 (Mountain (MST))
  - Summer (DST): UTC-6 (MDT)
- ZIP code: 59333
- Area code: 406
- GNIS feature ID: 772196

Hathaway is an unincorporated community in Rosebud County, Montana, United States. Hathaway is located at Exit 117 on Interstate 94, roughly 20 miles (32 km) west-southwest of Miles City. The community had a post office until July 29, 1995; it still has its own ZIP code, 59333.

The Northern Pacific Railroad established a section stop named Martin here in 1882. In 1883 the name was changed to honor Gen. Forrest Henry Hathaway.
