= Billings Senior High School =

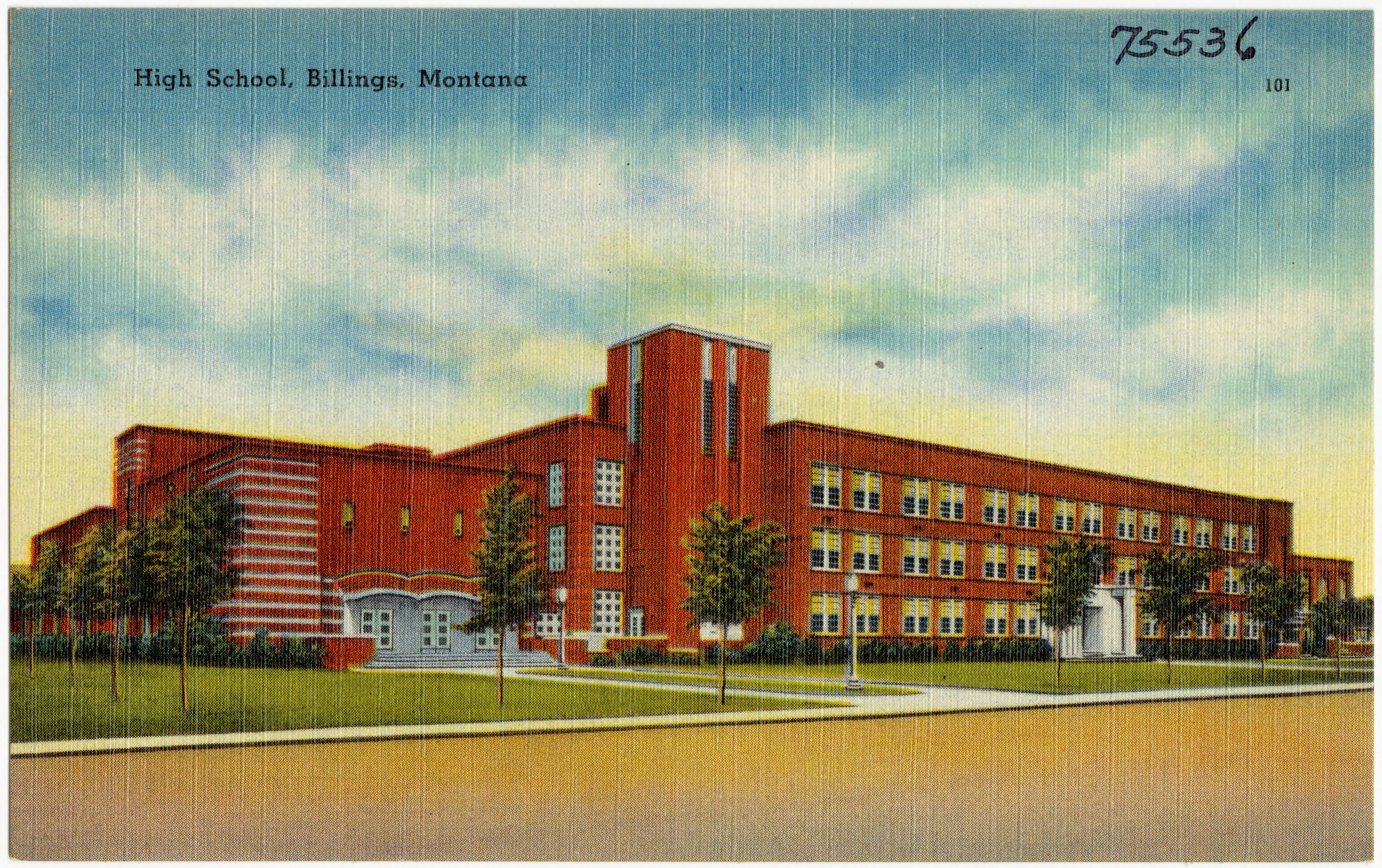

Location
- 425 Grand Avenue; Billings, Montana 59101; United States; 45°47′5″N 108°31′32″W

Information
- School district: Billings Public Schools District
- Principal: Michele (Shelli) Strouf
- Teaching staff: 97.93 (on a FTE basis)
- Grades: 9-12
- Enrollment: 1,675 (2023–2024)
- Student to teacher ratio: 17.10
- Color
- Nickname: Broncs
- Website: bshs.billingsschools.org

Billings Senior High School is located in Billings, Montana, United States. It is part of the Billings Public Schools District, and opened in 1940. Billings Senior High School is a comprehensive public institution.

== Notable alumni ==
- Stanley Anderson, actor
- Junior Bergen, football wide receiver
- John Bohlinger Jr., businessman and politician.
- Steve Booras, gridiron football player
- Julie Brown, retired distance runner
- Dustin Clausen, mathematician
- John Dahl, film director
- Bud Luckey, noted animator for Pixar Animation
- Joe McIntosh, former Major League Baseball pitcher
- Ray Metcalfe, politician and political activist in Alaska
- Nich Pertuit, football placekicker
- Jack Weyland, retired professor of physics at Brigham Young University–Idaho
