= Custer, Montana =

Census-designated place in Yellowstone County, Montana, United States

- Census-designated place
- Location of Custer, Montana
- Coordinates: 46°07′45″N 107°33′20″W
- Country: United States
- State: Montana
- County: Yellowstone

Area
  - Total: 0.31 sq mi (0.81 km^{2})
  - Land: 0.31 sq mi (0.81 km^{2})
  - Water: 0 sq mi (0.00 km^{2})
- Elevation: 2,746 ft (837 m)

Population (2020)
  - Total: 119
  - Density: 378.3/sq mi (146.07/km^{2})
- Time zone: UTC-7 (Mountain (MST))
  - Summer (DST): UTC-6 (MDT)
- ZIP code: 59024
- Area code: 406
- FIPS code: 30-18700
- GNIS feature ID: 2408635

Custer is a census-designated place (CDP) in Yellowstone County, Montana, United States. The population was 119 at the 2020 census.

== Description ==
This community bears the name of U.S. Army General George Armstrong Custer who was defeated and killed at the Battle of Little Big Horn, which took place nearby in 1876. Originally a Northern Pacific Railroad station established in 1882, the post office began in 1905.

== Geography ==
According to the United States Census Bureau, the CDP has a total area of 0.3 square miles (0.78 km^{2}), all land.

=== Climate ===
According to the Köppen Climate Classification system, Custer has a semi-arid climate, abbreviated "BSk" on climate maps.

== Demographics ==
Historical population
Census	Pop.	Note	%±
2020	119		—
U.S. Decennial Census

As of the census of 2000, there were 145 people, 68 households, and 39 families residing in the CDP. The population density was 563.7 inhabitants per square mile (217.6/km^{2}). There were 79 housing units at an average density of 307.1 units per square mile (118.6 units/km^{2}). The racial makeup of the CDP was 95.86% White, 1.38% from other races, and 2.76% from two or more races. Hispanic or Latino of any race were 1.38% of the population.

There were 68 households, out of which 25.0% had children under the age of 18 living with them, 51.5% were married couples living together, 5.9% had a female householder with no husband present, and 42.6% were non-families. 39.7% of all households were made up of individuals, and 13.2% had someone living alone who was 65 years of age or older. The average household size was 2.13 and the average family size was 2.87.

In the CDP, the population was spread out, with 21.4% under the age of 18, 4.1% from 18 to 24, 21.4% from 25 to 44, 37.2% from 45 to 64, and 15.9% who were 65 years of age or older. The median age was 46 years. For every 100 females, there were 110.1 males. For every 100 females age 18 and over, there were 123.5 males.

The median income for a household in the CDP was $26,944, and the median income for a family was $43,000. Males had a median income of $21,250 versus $0 for females. The per capita income for the CDP was $18,532. 1.4% of the population lived below the poverty line, this percentage was not made up of families, those under 18 or over 64.

== Education ==
The school district is Custer K-12 Schools, a unified K-12 district.

Custer Public Schools educates students from kindergarten through 12th grade. Custer High School's team name is the Rebels.

== See also ==
- List of census-designated places in Montana
