= Skyview High School (Montana) =

Coordinates: 45°49′54″N 108°30′56″W

Billings Skyview High School
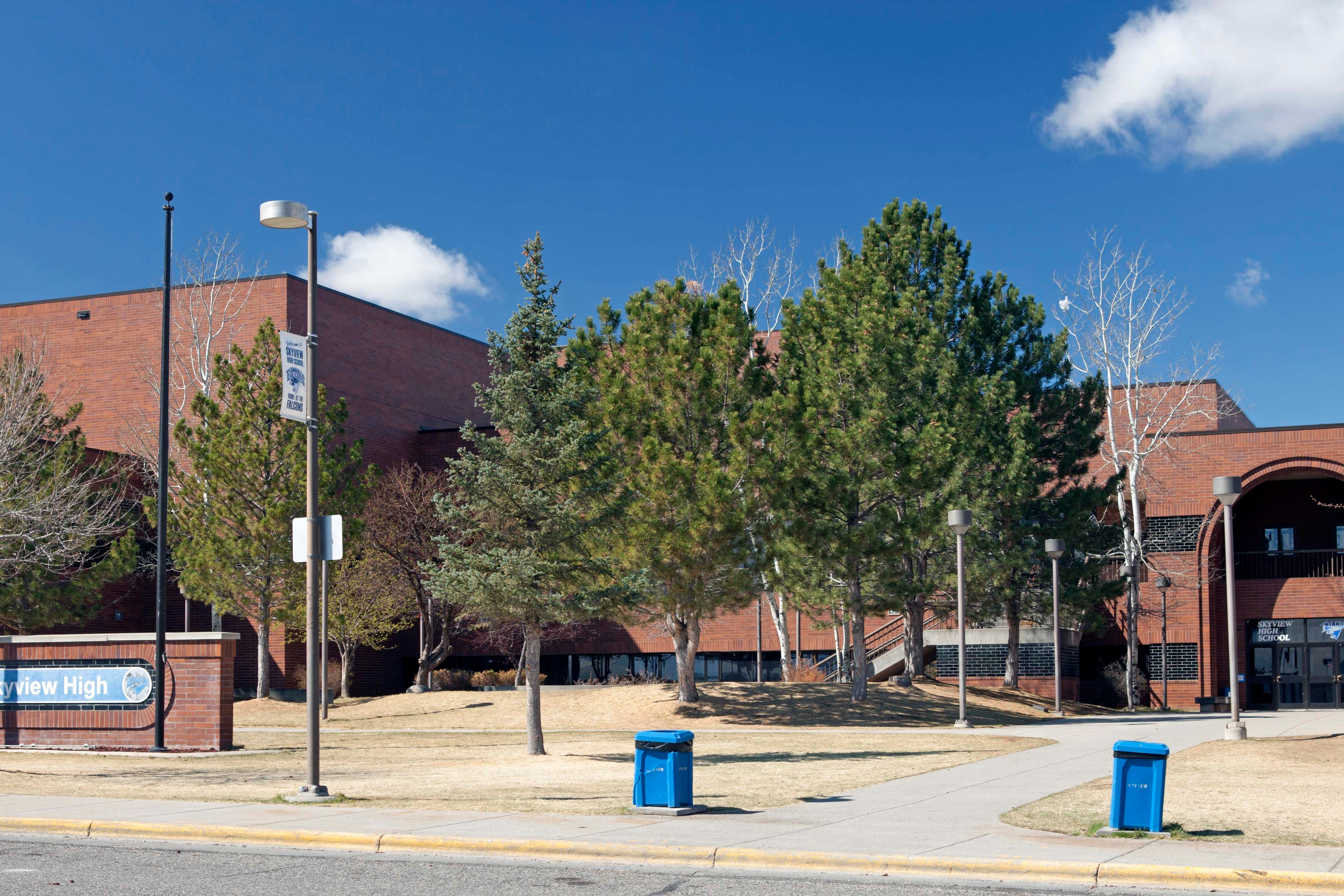

Location
- 1775 High Sierra Blvd; Billings, Montana; United States

Information
- Type: Public Secondary
- Established: 1987
- School district: Billings Public Schools
- Principal: Jay Wahl
- Teaching staff: 81.46 (FTE)
- Grades: 9-12
- Enrollment: 1,596 (2023–2024)
- Student to teacher ratio: 19.59
- Colors: Royal Blue, Silver, White
- Athletics: Basketball, Football, Wrestling, Golf, Soccer, Softball, Swimming, Tennis, Track, Volleyball, Cross Country, Cheerleading, Dance, Baseball, Girls Flag Football
- Mascot: Falcon
- Rival: Billings West and Billings Senior
- Accreditation: State of Montana and Northwest Association of Accredited Schools
- ACT average: 19.2
- Newspaper: Blue and Silver
- Yearbook: Wingspan
- Website: skyview.billingsschools.org

Billings Skyview High School, also known as Billings Skyview or Skyview, is a four-year comprehensive public high school in Billings, Montana. The school serves approximately 1,600 students with 92.5 certified staff, 36 support staff and 10 custodians under principal Deb Black, associate principal Danette Cerise, and Deans Scott Lynch and Jay Wahl. Skyview sits on 46 acres (190,000 m^{2}) and is 258,000 square feet (24,000 m^{2}) in size. It was built in 1987, making it the newest of three public high schools in Billings. Skyview's school colors are Royal Blue, Silver, and White and its mascot is a falcon.

== Publications ==
- Yearbook: Wingspan

== Clubs and activities ==
- Academic Team
- Adventure Club
- All Nations Indian Club
- Anime and Manga Club
- ARC Club
- Art Club
- Artificial Reality Contingency (ARC)
- Business Professionals of America (BPA)
- Chess Club
- Color Guard
- Drama Club
- Falconeers
- FCCLA
- Forensics: Speech/Debate
- Key Club
- Model UN
- National Honor Society
- Student Council
- Students Against Destructive Decisions
- Yearbook

== Academics ==
Available AP Courses include, but are not limited to:

- World History: Modern
- United States History
- United States Government
- Art and Design
- Art History
- Psychology
- Statistics
- Pre-Calculus
- Calculus AB
- Calculus BC
- Seminar
- Research
- English Language and Composition
- English Literature
- German Language and Culture
- French Language and Culture
- Spanish Language and Culture
- Biology
- Chemistry
- Physics 1
- Physics 2

== Academic team ==
Skyview has a successful Academic Team. They have placed first in the Montana Academic State Championship several times. They have also won the Big Sky Regional Science Bowl 3 times, allowing them to participate at a national level.
