= Waco, Montana =

Unincorporated community in Yellowstone County, Montana, United States

Coordinates: 46°04′26″N 107°42′25″W

Waco is a populated place and former town site located in Yellowstone County, Montana, United States. The elevation is 2,786 feet (849 m).

== History ==
=== Waco ===
Once a station on the Northern Pacific Railroad east of Billings, Waco had a few local accommodations and an active post office from 1907 to 1918. Waco was an agriculturally based community on the south side of the Yellowstone River, situated just off Custer Frontage Road. The region is still used for agriculture and a number of ranches have developed around it, but the town itself is no longer inhabited. Today Waco is a ghost town, with a few closed off streets and a small number of standing structures. Though a majority of the buildings have either collapsed or have been removed, enough are still standing to make for a true and recognizable ghost town that is partially accessible.

=== Fee ===
Less than a mile east of Waco also lies the site of Fee, once a nearby stop that also supported a short lived community. Nothing remains of Fee today.
