= Acton, Montana =

- Census Designated Place
- Location within Montana Location within the United States
- Coordinates: 45°55′44″N 108°40′43″W
- Country: United States
- State: Montana
- County: Yellowstone

Area
  - Total: 0.24 sq mi (0.62 km^{2})
  - Land: 0.24 sq mi (0.62 km^{2})
  - Water: 0 sq mi (0.00 km^{2})
- Elevation: 3,806 ft (1,160 m)

Population (2020)
  - Total: 48
  - Density: 200.4/sq mi (77.37/km^{2})
- Time zone: UTC-7 (Mountain (MST))
  - Summer (DST): UTC-6 (MDT)
- ZIP code: 59002
- Area code: 406
- GNIS feature ID: 2804624

Acton is a census-designated place in northwestern Yellowstone County, Montana, United States. As of the 2020 census, Acton had a population of 48. It has a postal ZIP code of 59002 and lies along Montana Highway 3 northwest of the city of Billings, the county seat of Yellowstone County.

== History ==
Acton is a small farming community which originated as a stop on the Great Northern Railroad. The post office was opened in 1910. Charles T. Robinson served as the original postmaster. The post office no longer exists.

== Demographics ==
Historical population
Census	Pop.	Note	%±
2020	48		—
U.S. Decennial Census

== Climate ==
According to the Köppen Climate Classification system, Acton has a semi-arid climate, abbreviated "BSk" on climate maps.

Climate data for Acton, Montana
Month	Jan	Feb	Mar	Apr	May	Jun	Jul	Aug	Sep	Oct	Nov	Dec	Year
Mean daily maximum °C (°F)	1 (33)	4 (39)	8 (46)	14 (57)	19 (67)	25 (77)	31 (87)	29 (85)	23 (73)	16 (60)	7 (45)	2 (36)	15 (59)
Mean daily minimum °C (°F)	−10 (14)	−7 (19)	−4 (25)	1 (34)	6 (43)	11 (52)	14 (58)	14 (57)	8 (47)	3 (37)	−3 (26)	−8 (18)	2 (36)
Average precipitation mm (inches)	18 (0.7)	15 (0.6)	28 (1.1)	46 (1.8)	58 (2.3)	53 (2.1)	28 (1.1)	23 (0.9)	33 (1.3)	30 (1.2)	18 (0.7)	15 (0.6)	360 (14.3)
Source: Weatherbase

== Education ==
The school districts are Broadview Elementary School District and Broadview High School District.
