= Yellowstone County, Montana =

County in Montana, United States

- County
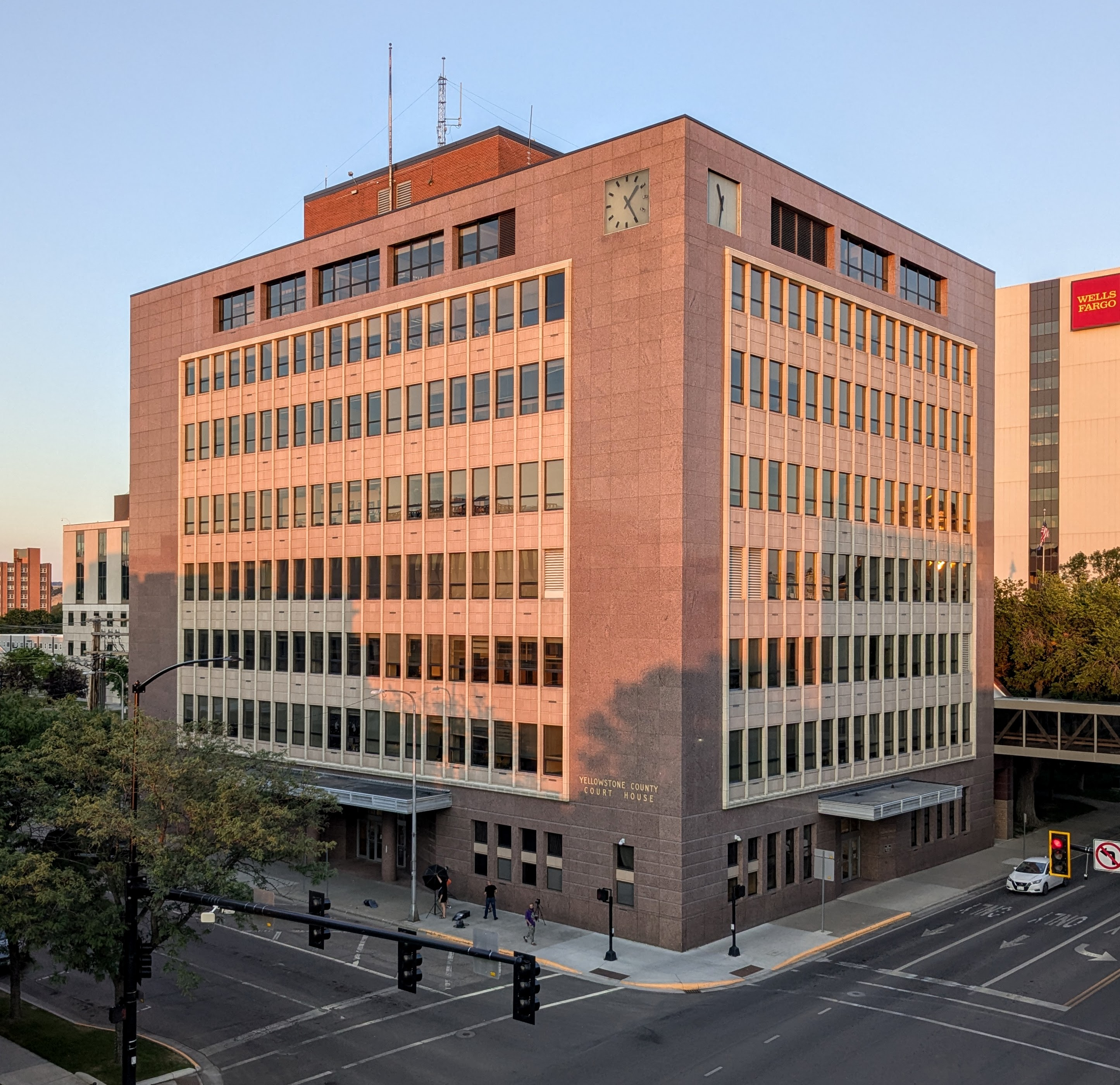
- The Yellowstone County Courthouse in Billings in 2024

- Seal

- Location within the U.S. state of Montana
- Coordinates: 45.9370°N 108.2767°W
- Country: United States
- State: Montana
- Founded: February 26, 1883 (created); May 1, 1883 (organized)
- Named for: Yellowstone River
- Seat: Billings
- Largest city: Billings

Area
  - Total: 2,649.035 sq mi (6,860.97 km^{2})
  - Land: 2,633.402 sq mi (6,820.48 km^{2})
  - Water: 15.633 sq mi (40.49 km^{2}) 0.59%

Population (2020)
  - Total: 164,731
  - Estimate (2025): 172,692 ▲
  - Density: 62.5544/sq mi (24.1524/km^{2})
- Time zone: UTC−7 (Mountain)
  - Summer (DST): UTC−6 (MDT)
- Area code: 406
- Congressional district: 2nd
- Website: yellowstonecountymt.gov
- • Montana county alphabet number 56 • Montana license plate prefix 03

Yellowstone County is a county in the U.S. state of Montana. As of the 2020 census, the population was 164,731, and was estimated to be 172,692 in 2025, making it the most populous county in Montana. The county seat and the largest city is Billings, the most populous city in Montana and the 253rd-most populous city in the United States. It contains over 15.09% of the state's population. Like the nearby national park, Yellowstone County is named after the Yellowstone River which roughly bisects the county, flowing southwest to northeast. The river, in turn, was named for the yellow sandstone cliffs in what is now Yellowstone County.

Yellowstone County is part of the Billings metropolitan area, which comprises all of Carbon, Stillwater, and Yellowstone Counties.

== History ==
Yellowstone County was created on February 26, 1883 and organized on May 1, 1883.

== Geography ==
According to the United States Census Bureau, the county has a total area of 2,649.035 square miles (6,860.97 km^{2}), of which 2,633.402 square miles (6,820.48 km^{2}) is land and 15.633 square miles (40.49 km^{2}) (0.59%) is water. It is the 23rd largest county in Montana by total area.

=== Major highways ===
- I-90
- I-90 BL
- I-94
- US 87
- US 212
- US 310
- MT 3
- MT 47
- S-302

=== Transit ===
- Billings Metropolitan Transit
- Express Arrow
- Jefferson Lines

=== Adjacent counties ===
- Musselshell County – north
- Rosebud County – northeast
- Treasure County – east
- Big Horn County – southeast
- Carbon County – southwest
- Stillwater County – west
- Golden Valley County – northwest

=== National protected areas ===
- Nez Perce National Historical Park (part)
- Pompeys Pillar National Monument

== Demographics ==
Historical population
Census	Pop.	Note	%±
1890	2,065		—
1900	6,212		200.8%
1910	22,944		269.3%
1920	29,600		29.0%
1930	30,785		4.0%
1940	41,182		33.8%
1950	55,875		35.7%
1960	79,016		41.4%
1970	87,367		10.6%
1980	108,035		23.7%
1990	113,419		5.0%
2000	129,352		14.0%
2010	147,972		14.4%
2020	164,731		11.3%
2025 (est.)	172,692		4.8%
U.S. Decennial Census; 1790–1960 1900–1990; 1990–2000 2010–2020

As of the fourth quarter of 2025, the median home value in Yellowstone County was $386,158.

As of the 2024 American Community Survey, there are 70,714 estimated households in Yellowstone County with an average of 2.37 persons per household. The county has a median household income of $76,858. Approximately 7.9% of the county's population lives at or below the poverty line. Yellowstone County has an estimated 63.7% employment rate, with 32.2% of the population holding a bachelor's degree or higher and 93.8% holding a high school diploma. There were 75,777 housing units at an average density of 28.78 per square mile (11.1/km^{2}).

The median age in the county was 40.2 years.

Yellowstone County, Montana – racial and ethnic composition Note: the US Census treats Hispanic/Latino as an ethnic category. This table excludes Latinos from the racial categories and assigns them to a separate category. Hispanics/Latinos may be of any race.
Race / ethnicity (NH = non-Hispanic)	Pop. 1980	Pop. 1990	Pop. 2000	Pop. 2010	Pop. 2020	Pop. 2024
White alone (NH)	102,178 (94.58%)	106,068 (93.52%)	117,698 (90.99%)	130,463 (88.17%)	136,514 (82.87%)	144,651 (84.30%)
Black or African American alone (NH)	269; 0.25%)	465; 0.41%)	542; 0.42%)	852 (0.58%)	1,187 (0.72%)	1,031 (0.60%)
Native American or Alaska Native alone (NH)	2,268; 2.10%)	3,086; 2.72%)	3,676; 2.84%)	5,377 (3.63%)	6,546 (3.97%)	7,255 (4.23%)
Asian alone (NH)	372 (0.34%)	604 (0.53%)	666 (0.51%)	915 (0.62%)	1,279 (0.78%)	1,290 (0.75%)
Pacific Islander alone (NH)	—	—	54 (0.04%)	104 (0.07%)	211 (0.13%)	135 (0.08%)
Other race alone (NH)	57 (0.05%)	38 (0.03%)	66 (0.05%)	84 (0.06%)	576 (0.35%)	—
Mixed race or multiracial (NH)	—	—	1,862 (1.44%)	3,222 (2.18%)	8,303 (5.04%)	5,130 (2.99%)
Hispanic or Latino (any race)	2,891 (2.68%)	3,158 (2.78%)	4,788 (3.70%)	6,955 (4.70%)	10,115 (6.14%)	12,091 (7.05%)
Total	108,035 (100.00%)	113,419 (100.00%)	129,352 (100.00%)	147,972 (100.00%)	164,731 (100.00%)	171,583 (100.00%)

=== 2024 estimate ===
As of the 2024 estimate, there were 171,583 people, 70,714 households, and _ families residing in the county. The population density was 65.16 inhabitants per square mile (25.2/km^{2}). There were 75,777 housing units at an average density of 28.78 per square mile (11.1/km^{2}). The racial makeup of the county was 89.60% White, 0.68% African American, 5.36% Native American, 0.82% Asian, 0.10% Pacific Islander, _% from some other races and 3.44% from two or more races. Hispanic or Latino people of any race were 7.05% of the population.

=== 2020 census ===
As of the 2020 census, there were 164,731 people, 67,578 households, and 42,022 families residing in the county. The population density was 62.55 inhabitants per square mile (24.2/km^{2}). There were 71,804 housing units at an average density of 27.27 inhabitants per square mile (10.5/km^{2}). The racial makeup of the county was 84.97% White, 0.79% African American, 4.39% Native American, 0.80% Asian, 0.14% Pacific Islander, 1.72% from some other races and 7.19% from two or more races. Hispanic or Latino people of any race were 6.14% of the population.

There were 67,578 households in the county, of which 28.6% had children under the age of 18 living with them and 26.7% had a female householder with no spouse or partner present. About 30.5% of all households were made up of individuals and 12.4% had someone living alone who was 65 years of age or older.

Of the residents, 23.2% were under the age of 18 and 17.8% were 65 years of age or older; the median age was 38.8 years. For every 100 females there were 96.4 males, and for every 100 females age 18 and over there were 93.9 males. Among occupied housing units, 66.3% were owner-occupied and 33.7% were renter-occupied. The homeowner vacancy rate was 1.4% and the rental vacancy rate was 7.1%.

=== 2010 census ===
As of the 2010 census, there were 147,972 people, 60,672 households, and 38,367 families residing in the county. The population density was 56.19 inhabitants per square mile (21.7/km^{2}). There were 63,943 housing units at an average density of 24.28 inhabitants per square mile (9.4/km^{2}). The racial makeup of the county was 90.71% White, 0.63% African American, 3.97% Native American, 0.63% Asian, 0.08% Pacific Islander, 1.19% from some other races and 2.78% from two or more races. Hispanic or Latino people of any race were 4.70% of the population.

In terms of ancestry, 32.4% were German, 14.0% were Irish, 11.3% were English, 10.0% were American, and 9.9% were Norwegian.

Of the 60,672 households, 30.5% had children under the age of 18 living with them, 48.0% were married couples living together, 10.5% had a female householder with no husband present, 36.8% were non-families, and 29.7% of all households were made up of individuals. The average household size was 2.38 and the average family size was 2.94. The median age was 38.3 years.

The median income for a household in the county was $48,641 and the median income for a family was $62,380. Males had a median income of $42,899 versus $30,403 for females. The per capita income for the county was $26,152. About 7.9% of families and 11.2% of the population were below the poverty line, including 15.6% of those under age 18 and 7.7% of those age 65 or over.

== Politics ==
Yellowstone County is very conservative for an urban county. Its voters have been reliably Republican for the better part of a century. Lyndon B. Johnson's 1964 landslide was the last time that the county voted for a Democratic candidate.

United States presidential election results for Yellowstone County, Montana
Year	Republican		Democratic		Third party(ies)	
Year	No.	%	No.	%	No.	%
1892	479	53.88%	369	41.51%	41	4.61%
1896	429	42.52%	575	56.99%	5	0.50%
1900	816	54.51%	654	43.69%	27	1.80%
1904	1,249	70.41%	436	24.58%	89	5.02%
1908	1,803	56.61%	1,114	34.98%	268	8.41%
1912	1,004	26.23%	1,193	31.17%	1,631	42.61%
1916	3,281	42.06%	4,259	54.60%	261	3.35%
1920	5,714	65.08%	2,782	31.69%	284	3.23%
1924	4,715	55.91%	1,172	13.90%	2,546	30.19%
1928	6,904	68.08%	3,205	31.60%	32	0.32%
1932	5,386	46.90%	5,777	50.31%	320	2.79%
1936	5,193	37.05%	8,575	61.18%	248	1.77%
1940	8,479	48.03%	9,036	51.18%	140	0.79%
1944	8,706	51.44%	8,140	48.09%	79	0.47%
1948	10,342	50.74%	9,718	47.67%	324	1.59%
1952	17,556	66.61%	8,750	33.20%	51	0.19%
1956	18,664	64.91%	10,088	35.09%	0	0.00%
1960	19,467	60.82%	12,356	38.61%	183	0.57%
1964	15,571	46.85%	17,446	52.49%	222	0.67%
1968	19,898	58.77%	11,682	34.50%	2,277	6.73%
1972	25,205	62.64%	13,602	33.80%	1,430	3.55%
1976	25,201	57.11%	18,329	41.54%	595	1.35%
1980	27,332	56.57%	15,272	31.61%	5,709	11.82%
1984	34,124	63.01%	19,437	35.89%	592	1.09%
1988	28,069	55.42%	21,987	43.41%	591	1.17%
1992	22,822	40.43%	20,163	35.72%	13,465	23.85%
1996	26,367	47.18%	22,992	41.14%	6,523	11.67%
2000	33,922	59.00%	20,370	35.43%	3,207	5.58%
2004	40,903	61.71%	24,120	36.39%	1,263	1.91%
2008	36,483	51.62%	32,038	45.33%	2,158	3.05%
2012	40,500	58.86%	26,403	38.37%	1,904	2.77%
2016	40,920	58.05%	22,171	31.45%	7,395	10.49%
2020	50,772	60.57%	30,679	36.60%	2,370	2.83%
2024	50,460	62.00%	28,392	34.88%	2,541	3.12%

== Communities ==
=== Cities ===
- Billings (county seat)
- Laurel

=== Town ===
- Broadview

=== Census-designated places ===
- Acton
- Ballantine
- Custer
- Huntley
- Lockwood
- Mountain View Colony
- Nibbe
- Pompeys Pillar
- Shepherd
- Worden

=== Other unincorporated communities ===
- Anita
- Billings Heights
- Bull Mountain
- Comanche
- Hesper
- Homewood Park
- Indian Arrow
- Newton
- Osborn
- Yegen

=== Ghost towns ===
- Coulson
- Mossmain
- Rimrock
- Waco

== Education ==
School districts include:

K-12 (unified):

- Custer K-12 Schools
- Huntley Project K-12 Schools
- Lockwood K-12 Schools

High school districts:

- Billings High School District
- Broadview High School District
- Laurel High School District
- Shepherd High School District

Elementary school districts:

- Billings Elementary School District
- Blue Creek Elementary School District
- Broadview Elementary School District
- Canyon Creek Elementary School District
- Elder Grove Elementary School District
- Elysian Elementary School District
- Independent Elementary School District
- Laurel Elementary School District
- Molt Elementary School District
- Morin Elementary School District
- Pioneer Elementary School District
- Shepherd Elementary School District
- Yellowstone Academy Elementary School District

== See also ==
- List of lakes in Yellowstone County, Montana
- List of mountains in Yellowstone County, Montana
- National Register of Historic Places listings in Yellowstone County, Montana
