= Rimrock, Montana =

Rimrock is a populated place located in Yellowstone County, Montana, United States at 45°48′08″N 108°42′11″W. The community is at an elevation of 3,468 feet.

== History ==
Rimrock was established as a stop on the Great Northern Railroad and was named after a nearby sandstone cliff formation.

Today the area is closed to the public, including the 72nd Street West access. The area is primarily used for agriculture. Only a few trees and the now unused railroad siding and mound can be seen. The layout can be viewed from Philps Park, which occupies part of the cliff formations above the site.
