= Billings West High School =

Location
- 2201 St Johns Avenue; Billings, Montana 59102; United States; 45.7724°N 108.5718°W

Information
- Type: Secondary school
- Motto: West is Best
- Established: 1959
- School district: Billings Public Schools
- Category: 2A
- Principal: Jeremy Carlson
- Teaching staff: 128.20 (FTE)
- Grades: 9-12
- Gender: all
- Enrollment: 2,180 (2023-2024)
- Student to teacher ratio: 14.66
- Colors: Gold and black
- Athletics: Basketball, Girls Basketball, Football, Girls Volleyball, Cross Country, Track and Field, Swimming, Tennis, Cheerleading, Softball, Wrestling, Girls Wrestling, Soccer, Girls Soccer, Golf, Speech and Debate, Weight Lifting, Special Education Olympics and Athletics
- Mascot: Golden Bear
- Rival: Senior High
- Accreditation: State of Montana and Northwest Association of Accredited Schools
- SAT average: 1270
- Yearbook: WestWard
- Website: bwhs.billingsschools.org

Billings West High School is a four-year comprehensive public high school in Billings, Montana. The school, a part of Billings Public Schools, serves around 2000 students with over 100 certified staff under principal Jeremy Carlson. Billings West's school colors are black and gold, and its mascot is the Golden Bear.

== Notable alumni ==
- Caden Dowler (2022), college football defensive back for the Montana State Bobcats
- Taco Dowler (2022), college football wide receiver for the Montana State Bobcats
