= Worden, Montana =

- CDP
- Streetside in Worden

- Location of Worden, Montana
- Coordinates: 45°57′44″N 108°09′44″W
- Country: United States
- State: Montana
- County: Yellowstone

Area
  - Total: 1.98 sq mi (5.12 km^{2})
  - Land: 1.98 sq mi (5.12 km^{2})
  - Water: 0 sq mi (0.00 km^{2})
- Elevation: 2,959 ft (902 m)

Population (2020)
  - Total: 582
  - Density: 294/sq mi (113.7/km^{2})
- Time zone: UTC-7 (Mountain (MST))
  - Summer (DST): UTC-6 (MDT)
- ZIP code: 59088
- Area code: 406
- FIPS code: 30-81925
- GNIS feature ID: 2409629

Worden is a census-designated place (CDP) in Yellowstone County, Montana, United States. The population was 582 at the 2020 census. Worden, along with Ballantine, Huntley, and Pompey's Pillar, is part of the Huntley Project, an irrigation district established by the United States Bureau of Reclamation in 1907.

Worden is home to a number of restaurants, bars, stores, churches, and other services. It is also the home of the Huntley Project School System, consisting of an elementary, junior high, and high school. Huntley Project High School's team name is the "Red Devils."

== History ==
Worden is located on land designated in 1868 as part of the Crow Indian Reservation. When the Northern Pacific Railroad was surveyed and built in the early 1880s, the Clermont station was built 21 miles from Billings 1882, just across the tracks from present-day Worden.

The town of Worden was mapped out in 1907 as part of the Huntley Project. . The name of the town was originally going to be Dixon, but as there was already a Dixon, Montana (now known as Sčilíp, Montana) the name Worden was suggested after Senator Thomas Dixon's wife, Frances. Frances was the daughter of F.L. Worden, one of the founders of Missoula, Montana. Irrigation transformed the area into an agricultural district and attracted immigrants. The town had a German Congregational church and a Methodist church.

Yellowstone County News was located in Worden in 1994 before relocating.

== Geography ==
According to the United States Census Bureau, the CDP has a total area of 2.0 square miles (5.2 km^{2}), all land. The Yellowstone River is just to the north.

== Demographics ==
Historical population
Census	Pop.	Note	%±
2020	582		—
U.S. Decennial Census

As of the census of 2000, there were 506 people, 223 households, and 136 families residing in the CDP. The population density was 254.1 inhabitants per square mile (98.1/km^{2}). There were 239 housing units at an average density of 120.0 per square mile (46.3/km^{2}). The racial makeup of the CDP was 96.25% White, 0.59% African American, 0.99% Native American, 0.20% Asian, 0.40% from other races, and 1.58% from two or more races. Hispanic or Latino of any race were 3.56% of the population.

There were 223 households, out of which 27.8% had children under the age of 18 living with them, 46.6% were married couples living together, 11.2% had a female householder with no husband present, and 39.0% were non-families. 35.4% of all households were made up of individuals, and 17.5% had someone living alone who was 65 years of age or older. The average household size was 2.27 and the average family size was 2.97.

In the CDP, the population was spread out, with 25.5% under the age of 18, 8.1% from 18 to 24, 25.7% from 25 to 44, 23.7% from 45 to 64, and 17.0% who were 65 years of age or older. The median age was 40 years. For every 100 females, there were 96.1 males. For every 100 females age 18 and over, there were 89.4 males.

The median income for a household in the CDP was $22,625, and the median income for a family was $38,393. Males had a median income of $22,434 versus $20,156 for females. The per capita income for the CDP was $14,319. About 3.8% of families and 8.5% of the population were below the poverty line, including 8.9% of those under age 18 and 16.5% of those age 65 or over.

== Media ==
The FM radio station KCHH is licensed in Worden. It plays an adult contemporary format.

== Infrastructure ==
Worden is located along Montana Highway 312. It is accessed via exit 14 on Interstate 94. Worden has a small library, Sunnyside Library, which was established in 1909. Worden is also home to Riverstone Health Clinic located at the end of Main Street

The nearest airport is Logan International Airport in Billings.

== Education ==
The school district is Huntley Project K-12 Schools, a K-12 unified school district.
