= Huntley Project =

Coordinates: 45°53′58″N 108°18′05″W

The Huntley Project is an irrigation project in southern Montana that was established by the United States Bureau of Reclamation in 1907. The district includes the towns of Huntley, Worden, Ballantine, and Pompeys Pillar.

Since the Huntley Project was established, the district's main cash crops have been sugar beets and alfalfa. Silage for the local cattle industry is also important.

== History ==
Bison-hunting Plains Indians, especially the Cheyenne, Crow, and Sioux, frequented this region south of the Yellowstone River from the 17th century. William Clark passed through in July 1806 with members of the Corps of Discovery and inscribed his name on Pompey's Rock. The Yellowstone River provided a route into this sagebrush-covered country for white fur trappers, hunters, and settlers. The U.S. Army made war on the Indian tribes over several decades, and the famous Battle of Little Bighorn took place nearby in June 1876.

The district that now includes the Huntley Project was designated as part of the Crow Indian Reservation under a treaty ratified on May 7, 1868. This preserved the area from occupation by white homesteads and cattle ranches, but by 1880 the virtual extinction of the bison made the traditional Crow economy impossible to sustain. By 1895 Crow farmers successfully irrigated and farmed part of the reservation, which had been considered an arid wasteland.

In 1882 the city of Billings, linked to the Northern Pacific Railroad, was founded within a few miles of the Crow reservation. In 1904 the United States government obtained the northern part of the reservation by cession from the Crow Indians. Congress authorized the Reclamation Service of the U.S. Department of the Interior to survey the land for a possible irrigation project. The Huntley Project, the fifth federal project to convert arid western land to farmland, was authorized in April 1905, and construction began in October. Despite cost overruns and unforeseen problems, the Pryor Division of the project, including Worden and Ballantine, was completed and receiving water by 1907.

The project took its name from the town of Huntley, a station on the Northern Pacific Railroad. In 1907 the new Huntley Project townsites of Worden, Ballantine, and Pompeys Pillar were laid out at intervals of about six miles along the railroad. On May 21, 1907, President Theodore Roosevelt declared the Pryor Division to be open for settlement. Farm units were distributed by lottery, but the pace of settlement may have been slowed by "lottery fanatics" from nearby Billings who drew numbers out of idle curiosity, with no intention of settling on the land. Of the first 1,000 names drawn, only 76 applied for a farm unit. The population of Huntley Project farms rose to 2,107 in 1917, but fell again to a probable low of 1,015 in 1923.

Much of the irrigation infrastructure of the Huntley Project had been poorly designed and cheaply built, and replacements were soon needed. Growing demand for water required more irrigation canals and an auxiliary pumping station, and by 1913 problems with inadequate drainage had caused hundreds of acres of arid land to become waterlogged. Settlers found that alkali in the soil made it difficult to profitably farm the area, and many farms failed in the recession following World War I. Poor crop yields made it difficult for farmers to pay their portion of the district's costs, so Reclamation refused to fund needed improvements. Tensions between Reclamation and the district farmers peaked during the 1920s, until on January 2, 1927, the two sides settled their dispute with a new contract.

Low water and dry weather in the 1930s led to the construction of the first retention dam, then a concrete weir in 1934. The Anita Dam and Reservoir project, about six miles southeast of Ballantine, was completed in 1937 by Civilian Conservation Corps workers.
