= Broadview, Montana =

- Town
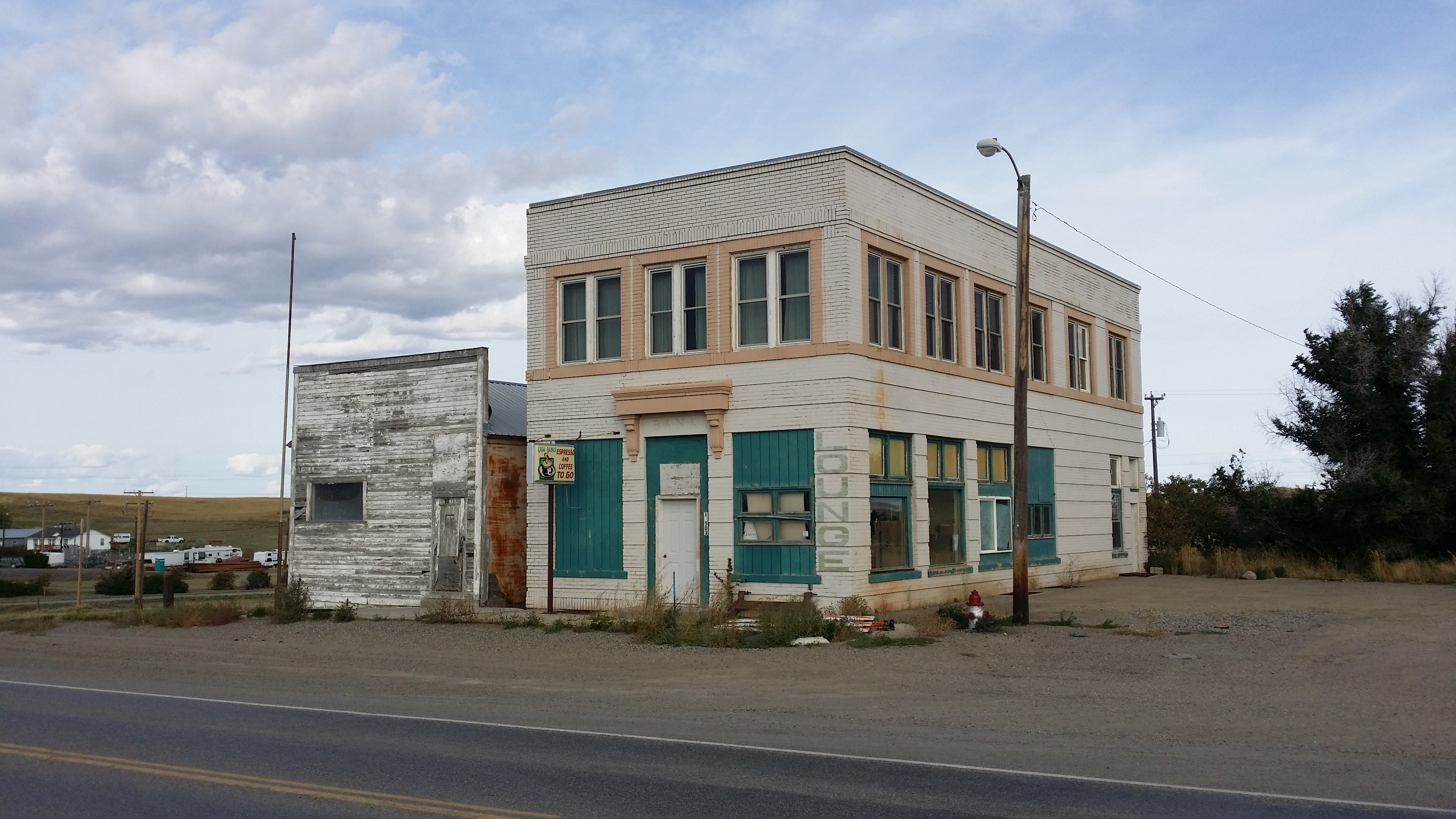
- Panoramio in Broadview

- Location of Broadview, Montana
- Coordinates: 46°05′56″N 108°52′34″W
- Country: United States
- State: Montana
- County: Yellowstone
- Established: 1908
- Incorporated: 1917

Area
  - Total: 0.26 sq mi (0.68 km^{2})
  - Land: 0.26 sq mi (0.68 km^{2})
  - Water: 0 sq mi (0.00 km^{2})
- Elevation: 3,881 ft (1,183 m)

Population (2020)
  - Total: 139
  - Estimate (2022): 139
  - Density: 530.7/sq mi (204.89/km^{2})
- Time zone: UTC–7 (Mountain (MST))
  - Summer (DST): UTC–6 (MDT)
- ZIP Code: 59015
- Area code: 406
- FIPS code: 30-09775
- GNIS feature ID: 2411729

Broadview is a town in Yellowstone County, Montana, United States. The population was 139 at the 2020 census.

The post office was established in 1908 and the town was incorporated in 1917.

== Geography ==
According to the United States Census Bureau, the town has a total area of 0.26 square miles (0.67 km^{2}), all land.

=== Climate ===
According to the Köppen Climate Classification system, Broadview has a semi-arid climate, abbreviated "BSk" on climate maps.

== Demographics ==
Historical population
| Census | Pop. | Note | %± |
|---|---|---|---|
| 1920 | 191 | | — |
| 1930 | 260 | | 36.1% |
| 1940 | 140 | | −46.2% |
| 1950 | 164 | | 17.1% |
| 1960 | 160 | | −2.4% |
| 1970 | 123 | | −23.1% |
| 1980 | 120 | | −2.4% |
| 1990 | 133 | | 10.8% |
| 2000 | 150 | | 12.8% |
| 2010 | 192 | | 28.0% |
| 2020 | 139 | | −27.6% |
| 2022 (est.) | 139 | Steady | 0.0% |
U.S. Decennial Census; 2020 Census

=== 2020 census ===
As of the 2020 census, there were 139 people, 61 households, and 42 families living in the town. There were 73 housing units.

=== 2010 census ===
As of the 2010 census, there were 192 people, 66 households, and 47 families living in the town. The population density was 738.5 inhabitants per square mile (285.1/km^{2}). There were 73 housing units at an average density of 280.8 per square mile (108.4/km^{2}). The racial makeup of the town was 95.3% White, 1.0% Native American, 3.1% from other races, and 0.5% from two or more races. Hispanic or Latino of any race were 6.8% of the population.

There were 66 households, of which 34.8% had children under the age of 18 living with them, 57.6% were married couples living together, 7.6% had a female householder with no husband present, 6.1% had a male householder with no wife present, and 28.8% were non-families. 24.2% of all households were made up of individuals, and 18.2% had someone living alone who was 65 years of age or older. The average household size was 2.91 and the average family size was 3.43.

The median age in the town was 39.5 years. 31.2% of residents were under the age of 18; 5.8% were between the ages of 18 and 24; 21.9% were from 25 to 44; 25.1% were from 45 to 64; and 16.1% were 65 years of age or older. The gender makeup of the town was 52.6% male and 47.4% female.

=== 2000 census ===
As of the 2000 census, there were 150 people, 64 households, and 41 families living in the town. The population density was 624.7 inhabitants per square mile (241.2/km^{2}). There were 66 housing units at an average density of 274.9 per square mile (106.1/km^{2}). The racial makeup of the town was 96.67% White, 0.67% Native American, and 2.67% from two or more races. Hispanic or Latino of any race were 2.67% of the population.

There were 64 households, out of which 31.3% had children under the age of 18 living with them, 53.1% were married couples living together, 4.7% had a female householder with no husband present, and 34.4% were non-families. 32.8% of all households were made up of individuals, and 17.2% had someone living alone who was 65 years of age or older. The average household size was 2.34 and the average family size was 2.95.

In the town, the population was spread out, with 28.0% under the age of 18, 6.0% from 18 to 24, 20.7% from 25 to 44, 27.3% from 45 to 64, and 18.0% who were 65 years of age or older. The median age was 42 years. For every 100 females, there were 80.7 males. For every 100 females age 18 and over, there were 86.2 males.

The median income for a household in the town was $29,500, and the median income for a family was $34,688. Males had a median income of $35,417 versus $16,250 for females. The per capita income for the town was $12,882. There were 6.4% of families and 9.8% of the population living below the poverty line, including 10.6% of under eighteens and 16.7% of those over 64.

== Education ==
Broadview School District educates students from kindergarten through 12th grade. The mascot for Broadview High School is the Pirates.
