= Pompeys Pillar (community), Montana =

Pompeys Pillar, Montana
- Census-designated place
- Location within Montana Location within the United States
- Coordinates: 45°59′26″N 107°57′01″W
- Country: United States
- State: Montana
- County: Yellowstone

Area
  - Total: 0.20 sq mi (0.51 km^{2})
  - Land: 0.20 sq mi (0.51 km^{2})
  - Water: 0 sq mi (0.00 km^{2})
- Elevation: 2,894 ft (882 m)

Population (2020)
  - Total: 51
  - Density: 261.4/sq mi (100.91/km^{2})
- Time zone: UTC-7 (Mountain (MST))
  - Summer (DST): UTC-6 (MDT)
- ZIP code: 59064
- Area code: 406
- GNIS feature ID: 2804324

Pompeys Pillar is a Census-designated place in Yellowstone County, Montana, United States.

== History ==
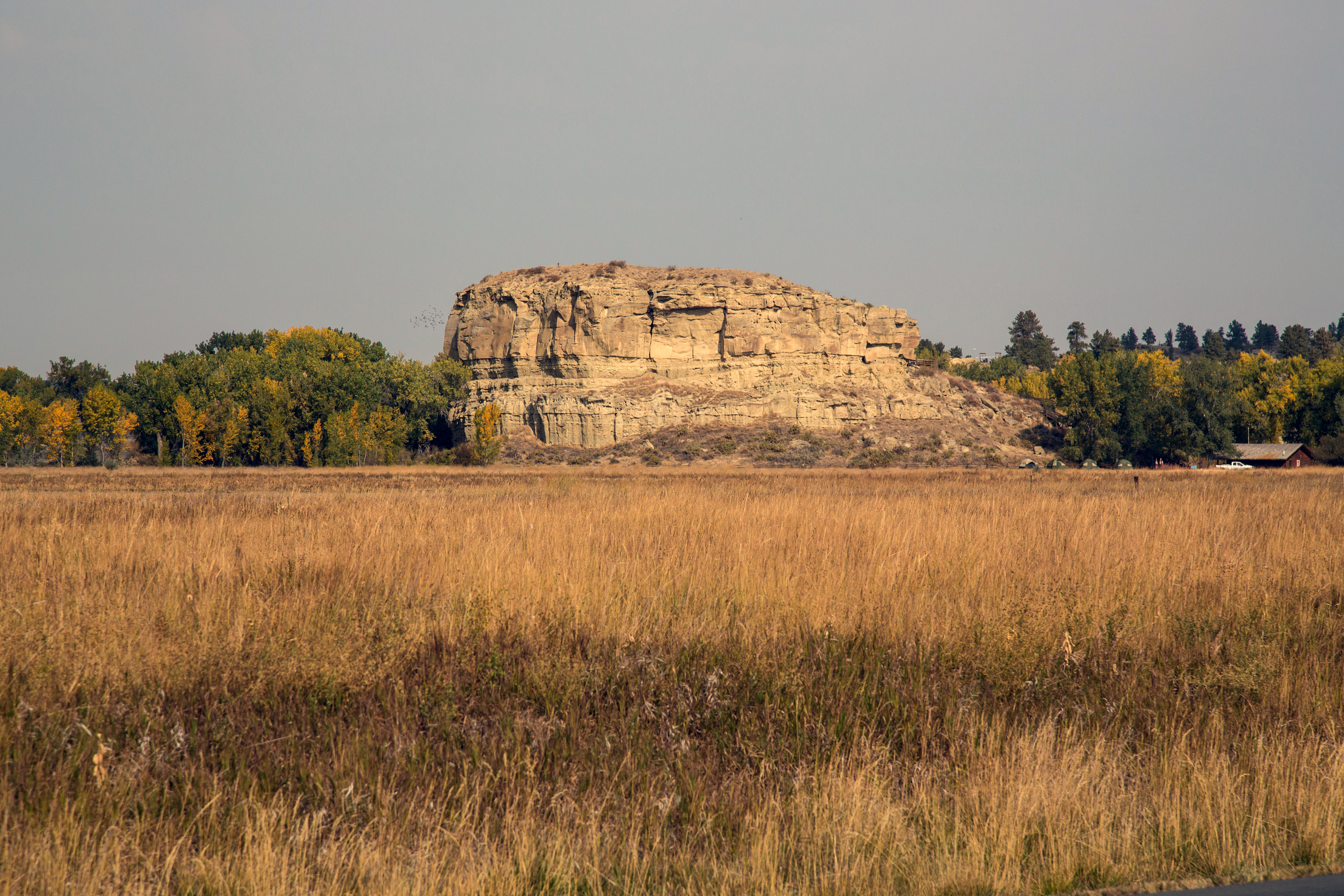
Pompeys Pillar National Monument

The town of Pompeys Pillar was founded in 1907 and was named after and situated less than a mile east of Pompeys Pillar National Monument, a 150 foot tall sedimentary rock formation best known for William Clark's inscription of his name and the date July 25, 1806 on its surface. The site also has significant evidence of human activity spanning an estimated 11,000 years.

The town of Pompeys Pillar was first planned out as a railroad station within the Huntley Project, an irrigation project managed by the United States Bureau of Reclamation.

A Catholic church and a Union Congregational church once existed in Pompeys Pillar. The Northern Pacific Railroad connected the town to Billings, about 29 miles southwest.

Pompeys Pillar National Monument was created in 2001 and placed under the jurisdiction of the Bureau of Land Management. In 2006 a new visitor center and museum complex opened, coinciding with the bicentennial of the Lewis and Clark Expedition. The site also has a small gift shop and other amenities.

== Education ==
The school district is Huntley Project K-12 Schools, a K-12 unified school district.

== Demographics ==
Historical population
Census	Pop.	Note	%±
2020	51		—
U.S. Decennial Census
